= Tan-y-Deri =

House in Wyoming, Wisconsin

- Tan-y-deri
- U.S. National Register of Historic Places
- U.S. Historic district – Contributing property
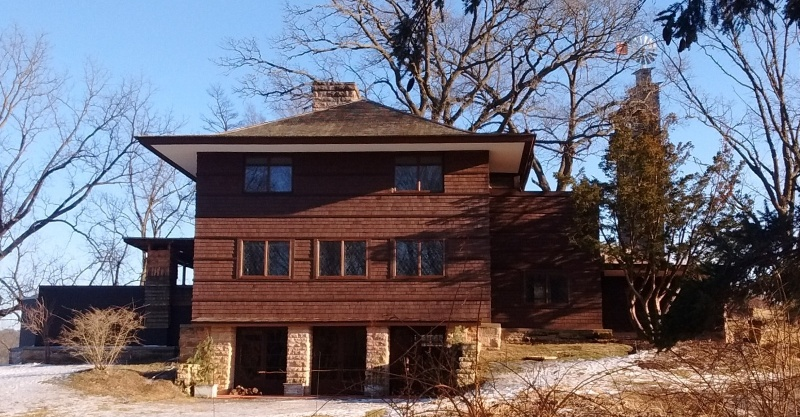
- Tan-y-Deri (Jane and Andrew Porter home) on the Taliesin Estate

- Location within Wisconsin Location within the United States
- Interactive map showing Tan-y-Deri
- Location: Wyoming, Iowa County, Wisconsin
- Coordinates: 43°08′30″N 90°04′15″W
- Built: 1907–1908
- Architect: Frank Lloyd Wright
- Architectural style: Prairie School
- Visitation: 25,000 (2019)
- Website: "Tan-y-Deri".
- NRHP reference No.: 73000081
- Added to NRHP: March 14, 1973

Tan-y-Deri, also known as the Andrew T. Porter Home and the Jane and Andrew Porter Home, is a house in Wyoming, Iowa County, Wisconsin, United States. It was designed in 1907 by the architect Frank Lloyd Wright for his sister Jane Porter (1869–1953) and her family. Jane, her husband Andrew Porter (1858–1948), and their children James (1901–1912) and Anna (1905–1934) moved into the house by late January 1908. The home stands in a valley that was originally settled by the Lloyd Joneses, who were the family of Wright and his sister's mother. The Lloyd Joneses were originally from Wales and, as a result of this heritage, Wright chose a Welsh name for the Porter home: "tan-y-deri" is Welsh for "under the oaks".

Tan-y-Deri is on Wright's Taliesin estate, which was declared a National Historic Landmark in 1976. It is one of five Wright-designed buildings on the estate, of which two can be seen from Tan-y-Deri: the Romeo and Juliet Windmill, and the main Taliesin house. The other two buildings on the estate are the Hillside Home School II and Midway Barn, the latter being Wright's farming facility.

== Design ==
The Porter family moved to the town of Wyoming because Andrew had been hired to be the business manager of the nearby Hillside Home School run by Jane's aunts, Jane and Ellen C. Lloyd Jones. Wright designed a home for the Porters, but they chose a design of his that was more economical: Tan-y-deri is an example of one of his designs for A Fireproof House for $5,000. Wright's intended to make these homes fireproof by using concrete. However, since the home was intended for the country, the architect modified the design so that it was clad with cedar shingles.

The home was designed with two floors. The main floor had the living room, dining room, and kitchen. And open veranda was accessible from the living room and dining room. The second floor had four bedrooms and the bathroom. Each bedroom was placed on a corner. The home design included an unattached horse stable (no longer extant).

== History ==
In 1911, Wright would design his own home, Taliesin, down from the top of a hill within sight of Tan-y-deri (Taliesin is also a Welsh word and means, "shining brow"). Three years later, Tan-y-deri would be used for triage following the attack and fire at Taliesin that resulted in seven deaths. Jane and Andrew's four-year-old son, Franklin, was kept upstairs away from the victims, but his bedroom overlooked the open veranda on which they were laid. Wright biographer, Meryle Secrest, wrote that Franklin, while recalling his memories of the event:

… Mingled with the memory of intense excitement of the fire is that of men moaning in the night with pain, and of a whippoorwill singing during moments of quiet…. For ever after the song of a whippoorwill at night at Tan-y-Deri seems infinitely sad.

The Hillside Home School closed in 1915, so the next year, Andrew went to work in Chicago in an investment firm. Two years after that, the family followed Andrew to Chicago and the Porters purchased the Arthur Heurtley House, also by Wright. Tan-y-deri then became a summer vacation home for the Porters until the 1930s. Andrew Porter retired in 1935, after which he and Jane returned to living at Tan-y-deri full time. They remodeled the lower level, opening the former basement into excavated space on the north. By the 1930s, Frank Lloyd Wright had started the Taliesin Fellowship (his architectural apprentice program) on the Taliesin estate.

Andrew died several years after World War II, in 1948. Jane died five years later. In 1955 their son, Franklin, sold the home and surrounding acre to his uncle, so it also became part of the Taliesin estate. The estate is owned by the Frank Lloyd Wright Foundation, which was founded by Frank Lloyd Wright and his wife, Olgivanna, in 1940.

Frank Lloyd Wright left Tan-y-Deri and the rest of the Taliesin estate to the Frank Lloyd Wright Foundation. Because the house has been owned by the Frank Lloyd Wright Foundation, it has since been used as housing by the Taliesin Fellowship and the School of Architecture at Taliesin. A major restoration project of the home was carried out by Taliesin Preservation, an independent non-profit organization dedicated to preserving the Taliesin estate and running a tour program and bookstore housed near the site at the Frank Lloyd Wright Visitor Center (also a Wright design).

== See also ==
- List of Frank Lloyd Wright works
