= Hillside Home School II =

Building in Wyoming, Wisconsin

- The Hillside Home School
- U.S. National Historic Landmark District – Contributing property
- The Hillside Home School on the Taliesin Estate

- Location within Wisconsin Location within the United States
- Interactive map showing the location of Hillside Home School II
- Location: South of Spring Green, in Iowa County, Wisconsin
- Coordinates: 43°08′30″N 90°04′15″W
- Built: 1901-03, 1932, 1952
- Architect: Frank Lloyd Wright
- Architectural style: Prairie School
- Visitation: 25,000 (2019)
- Website: "Hillside Home School".
- Part of: Taliesin (ID73000081)

Significant dates
- Added to NRHP: March 14, 1973
- Designated NHLDCP: January 7, 1976

The Hillside Home School II was originally designed by architect Frank Lloyd Wright in 1901 for his aunts Jane and Ellen C. Lloyd Jones in the town of Wyoming, Wisconsin (south of the village of Spring Green). The Lloyd Jones sisters commissioned the building to provide classrooms for their school, also known as the Hillside Home School. The Hillside Home School structure is on the Taliesin estate, which was declared a National Historic Landmark in 1976. There are four other Wright-designed buildings on the estate (also National Historic Landmarks): the Romeo and Juliet Windmill tower, Tan-y-Deri, Midway Barn, and Wright's home, Taliesin.

== History ==
The Hillside Home School institution was a nonsectarian, coeducational, day and boarding school for children from first through twelfth grade (Wright would start his home, Taliesin north of the school, 10 years later, in 1911). This structure was the third building he would design for his aunts. He designed the first building, Hillside Home School I, in 1887, and the second one, Romeo and Juliet Windmill Tower, in 1896.

The Weekly Home News (Spring Green's newspaper) reported on October 17, 1901, that: "Owing to the increased attendance, the principals have decided to build a new schoolhouse. The plans have been drawn and sent from the studio of Frank Ll. Wright, architect, Chicago, and work upon the construction will begin at once." The "Home News" then reported on February 19, 1903, that the building would be complete by "the last day of April".

The Hillside Home School institution ran from 1887 until 1915. Educator Mary Ellen Chase taught at the Hillside Home School for three years in the beginning of her career (1910–1913). She later wrote about her experiences in the book, The Goodly Fellowship:

I suppose that the Hillside Home School were it existing today as it was existing in 1909, would be termed a progressive school by all the supporters and disciples of such institutions. Yet the charm and value of Hillside lay in the fact that it did not standoff and gaze complacently at itself as a pioneer in the new education. In other words, it lacked the self-consciousness as well as the self-righteousness of certain of our modern experiments in child growth instead of child discipline... It was simply a school, a home, and a farm all in one....

Jane and Ellen Lloyd Jones closed the school in 1915, and the grounds were purchased by Frank Lloyd Wright, who wrote about the "acute financial distress" of the Lloyd Jones sisters and their school:

There seemed no way out; no one to help. So I did. To "pay up" and give them a little rest—rest so much needed but which no one, least of all myself, believed they knew how to take. They wanted to turn everything over to me, asking me to promise that their work would continue. I promised. That promise comforted them.

== Taliesin Fellowship ==
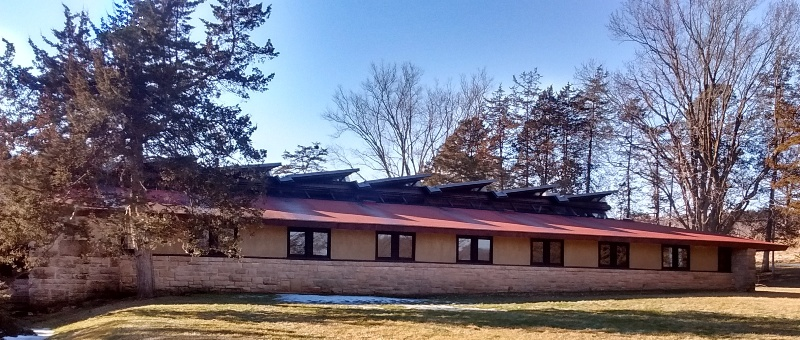
The east facade of the Hillside Drafting Studio at Hillside Home School II

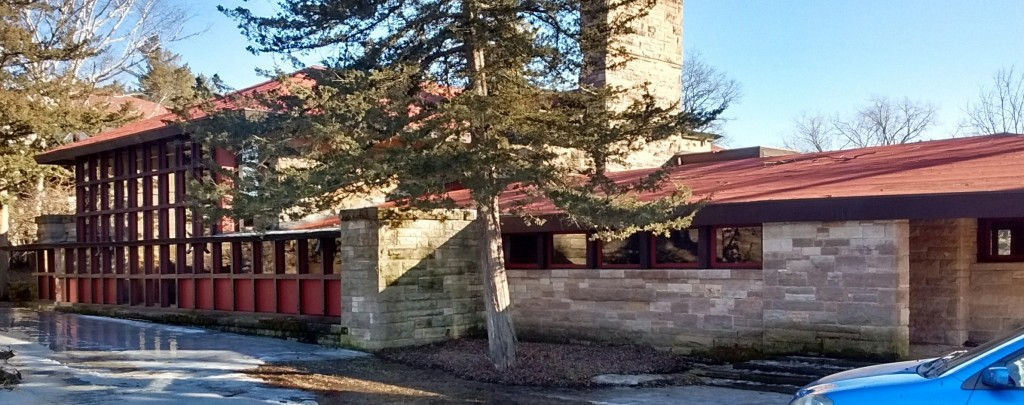
The north facade of the Hillside Theater at Hillside Home School II

In 1932, Wright was able to use the Hillside Home School building for his newly established Taliesin Fellowship (now the School of Architecture at Taliesin). He and his apprentices in the Fellowship converted the old gymnasium on the west side of the original Hillside Home School structure into a theater. On the north end of the original Hillside Home School structure, he added a large drafting room with dormitories on either side (left). The original theater was re-designed and reconstructed after the original one was destroyed by fire in 1952 (rebuilt theater, lower left).

In 1941, architectural historian Henry-Russell Hitchcock described the Hillside Home School building in his book, In the Nature of Materials:

The construction is unusually solid for this period of Wright's work, comparing thus with the contemporary Heurtley house. The lower walls are of native rock-faced random ashlar, superbly laid and reminding one of the finest of Richardson's masonry. But the stone was light and flesh-colored and has remained so in this country environment so that the effect is not grim or even severe. The marked batter of the pavilion walls serves to centralize and concentrate their design. This batter was used on the Imperial Hotel fifteen years later. It also appears once more in the rough stone and concrete bases of Taliesin West, 1938, and the Pauson house, 1940, near Phoenix, Arizona.

The drafting studio at Hillside became Wright's main Wisconsin studio after World War II. As a result, most of Wright's commissions and building designs were worked on in this studio while Wright was in Wisconsin in the summer. These designs include:

- First Unitarian Society Meeting House
- Annunciation Greek Orthodox Church
- Solomon R. Guggenheim Museum
- Price Tower
- "The Illinois", a project for a mile-high building, in 1956.

In 2024, Frank Lloyd Wright's Hillside Theater in Wisconsin reopened after an extensive five-year restoration.The restoration included eliminating water seepage from underground, installing an HVAC system, and improving accessibility with new walkways. Other updates included repairs to the roof, exterior and interior finishes, restoration of the theater curtain and two major Asian bodhisattva sculptures.

== See also ==
- List of Frank Lloyd Wright works
