= Hillside Home School I =

Building in Wyoming, Wisconsin

Hillside Home Building
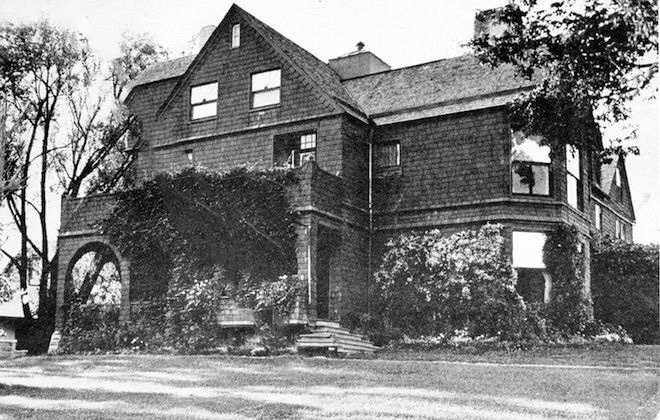
- The south facade of Hillside Home School I.

- Location within Wisconsin Location within the United States

General information
- Architectural style: Shingle Style
- Location: south of Spring Green, in Iowa County, Wisconsin
- Coordinates: 43°08′30″N 90°04′15″W
- Construction started: 1887
- Completed: 1887
- Demolished: 1950

Design and construction
- Architect: Frank Lloyd Wright

Hillside Home School I, also known as the Hillside Home Building, was a Shingle Style building that architect Frank Lloyd Wright designed in 1887. The building was constructed for his aunts, Ellen and Jane Lloyd Jones for their Hillside Home School in the town of Wyoming, Wisconsin (south of the village of Spring Green). The building functioned as a dormitory and library. Wright had the building demolished in 1950.

== History ==
In March 1887, 19-year-old Frank Lloyd Wright, having newly moved to Chicago to become an architect, received a letter from his aunt, Ellen ("Nell") C. Lloyd Jones, asking him to perhaps design a building for the school that she planned with her sister, Jane ("Jenny"). Biographer Meryle Secrest wrote about the letter from "Aunt Nell" to Wright in her biography on the architect:

The letter contains detailed instructions about floor plans.... She added that some of her friends were contributing their architectural notions. The nephew seems to have cut them all out fast. His resulting designs were evidently derived from those of [Joseph Lyman] Silsbee [his then-employer], and one of his authorized biographies more or less acknowledges that this architect played the largest role. Wright dismissed his first attempt as "amateurish."

Nell Lloyd Jones asked her nephew to design this structure because she and Jenny were planning on beginning the Hillside Home School on land left to them by their father. This building, which became known as the "Home Building", was the first one designed specifically by Wright for the school, a coeducational day and boarding school which functioned until 1915. Silsbee had introduced the young Wright to the "Shingle Style mixture of Queen Anne and Colonial elements." In 1907, Spring Green's newspaper, the Weekly Home News, ran an article focused on the Hillside Home School institution, then in its twentieth year. In the section about the Home Building, the article stated that it:

[C]ontains the parlors, in one of which there is a beautiful carved fireplace which at once attracts the attention of the visitor…. This building also contains the dining rooms, living rooms and kitchens, which are all modern and well-equipped. Besides these are twenty-two rooms which are occupied by the girls and some of the teachers. They are all large, well ventilated and sunny. The architecture of this building is English.

The Home Building was the first of three structures that Wright would design for the Hillside Home School. In addition to the 1887 design, he was commissioned to design the Romeo and Juliet Windmill in 1896 and the Hillside Home School in 1901 (often referred to as Hillside Home School II to differentiate it from the 1887 structure). Wright did not have affection for any of the other structures from the Hillside Home School campus except for his own. He noted later in his autobiography that

It appeared that the individualities expressed by the glowing personalities of Aunt Nell and Aunt Jane [sic] had been all there was of the Hillside Home School except the idealistic buildings I had built for them…. The several other buildings were so ugly and worthless they were only waiting to be torn down.

The architect began to remove buildings from the Hillside Home School campus in the 1930s after he started his apprentice program, the Taliesin Fellowship (now the School of Architecture at Taliesin). Wright ordered the destruction of the Home Building in 1950 to the surprise of some of his apprentices in the Taliesin Fellowship. Former apprentice, Curtis Besinger, noted later that:

[Wright]... set a crew to work on the demolition of the old Home building. He wanted the site cleared and leveled before his return [from a trip he was taking with his family to England]. Mr. Wright's decision to remove that building came as a surprise. He had started the remodeling of this house… in the early years of the Fellowship, and had attempted to change the building… into one resembling the buildings he had designed for his aunts… The roof had been reconfigured and given red tile like that of other Hillside buildings…. But the site was clear when the Wrights returned.

This left only two of Wright's buildings on the former campus of the Hillside Home School: his 1901 Hillside Home School structure, and the Romeo and Juliet Windmill. The site of the Hillside Home School campus is part of Wright's Taliesin estate. It is owned by the Frank Lloyd Wright Foundation.

== See also ==
- List of Frank Lloyd Wright works
