= Arthur John Matthews =

Seventh president of Arizona State University (1860–1942)

7th President of Arizona State University
- In office 1900–1930
- Preceded by: Joseph Warren Smith
- Succeeded by: Ralph Waldo Swetman

Personal details
- Born: September 3, 1860 Cazenovia, New York, U.S.
- Died: July 20, 1942 (aged 81) Long Beach, California, U.S.
- Education: Syracuse University
- Profession: University President, Educator

Arthur John Matthews (September 3, 1860 – July 20, 1942) was the seventh principal/president of Arizona State University (ASU), then known as the Tempe Normal School. He served as principal from 1900 to 1904, when the position was renamed president; he remained president until 1930. Matthews is the longest-tenured president in ASU history.

== Life ==
Matthews was born on September 3, 1860, in Cazenovia, New York, to Patrick Henry and Anne King Matthews. After attending the Methodist Cazenovia Seminary and Syracuse University, Matthews became a teacher at the age of 19, while still at the seminary and Syracuse, and later moved to positions as teacher in West Eaton and superintendent of the schools in Adams. In 1887, Matthews moved to Wyoming, where he became superintendent of schools in the towns of Rock Springs and Rawlins.

In 1896, Matthews ran as a Democrat for the post of Wyoming State Superintendent of Public Instruction and lost to Republican Estelle Reele, the first woman to be elected to a public office in the United States.

In 1897, Matthews moved with his family to Arizona due to the health of their daughter, Anna. He became the superintendent of schools in the town of Prescott.

== At the Normal School ==
Matthews was appointed principal of the Tempe Normal School on June 7, 1900 and was the seventh president in the institution's 15-year history. He immediately provided much-needed leadership stability, remaining in his leadership role at the school for the next three decades.

One of his major achievements was converting the school to no longer admit high school students or "subnormals", as it had when few high schools existed in the state. This move stimulated the founding of new high schools. He also consolidated the school, which had gone by several varying names, under the Tempe Normal School name; in 1925, the Normal School changed its name to Tempe State Teacher's College after Matthews promoted a bill in the state legislature to give the institution degree-granting status, which was opposed by some legislators.

Matthews also served as registrar, business manager, and instructor of courses in law, economics, and mathematics.

In 1902, Matthews spearheaded the development of the normal school's first dormitory, Alpha Hall, which had been built in 1898 as a boarding club. It housed 25 women and was later converted to a men's dormitory.

In June 1930, Matthews retired from the Teacher's College and received the title president emeritus. He was replaced by Ralph Waldo Swetman.

== Educational involvement ==
Matthews was active in various educational organizations, such as state teacher's associations in both Wyoming and Arizona. He also became a member of the Arizona Board of Education and the National Education Association. Matthews assisted in writing the education portion of the Constitution of Arizona.

== Personal life ==
In 1887, Matthews married Carrie Louise Walden, with whom he had two children, Arthur and Anna. He was an active Mason and member of the Knights of Pythias.

Matthews died on July 20, 1942, in Long Beach, California. His body lay in state in the Matthews Library, named for him and built in 1930.

== Buildings ==
18 buildings were constructed during Matthews's three decades as head of the school; six remain in use today, two of which are named for A. J. Matthews and his wife, Carrie:

- Matthews Hall, built in 1922, was originally commissioned as a men's dormitory. In 1930, when the Matthews Library was completed, the residential hall was renamed in honor of his wife, Carrie, as it had become a women's dormitory. It is the oldest intact dormitory on the ASU campus.
- Matthews Center, built in 1930, served as the school library until 1966; it also housed university administrative offices until 1950. After its replacement, it became home to a variety of offices, currently including student media and disability resources.
