= Romeo and Juliet Windmill =

Building in Wyoming, Wisconsin

- U.S. National Register of Historic Places
- U.S. Historic district – Contributing property
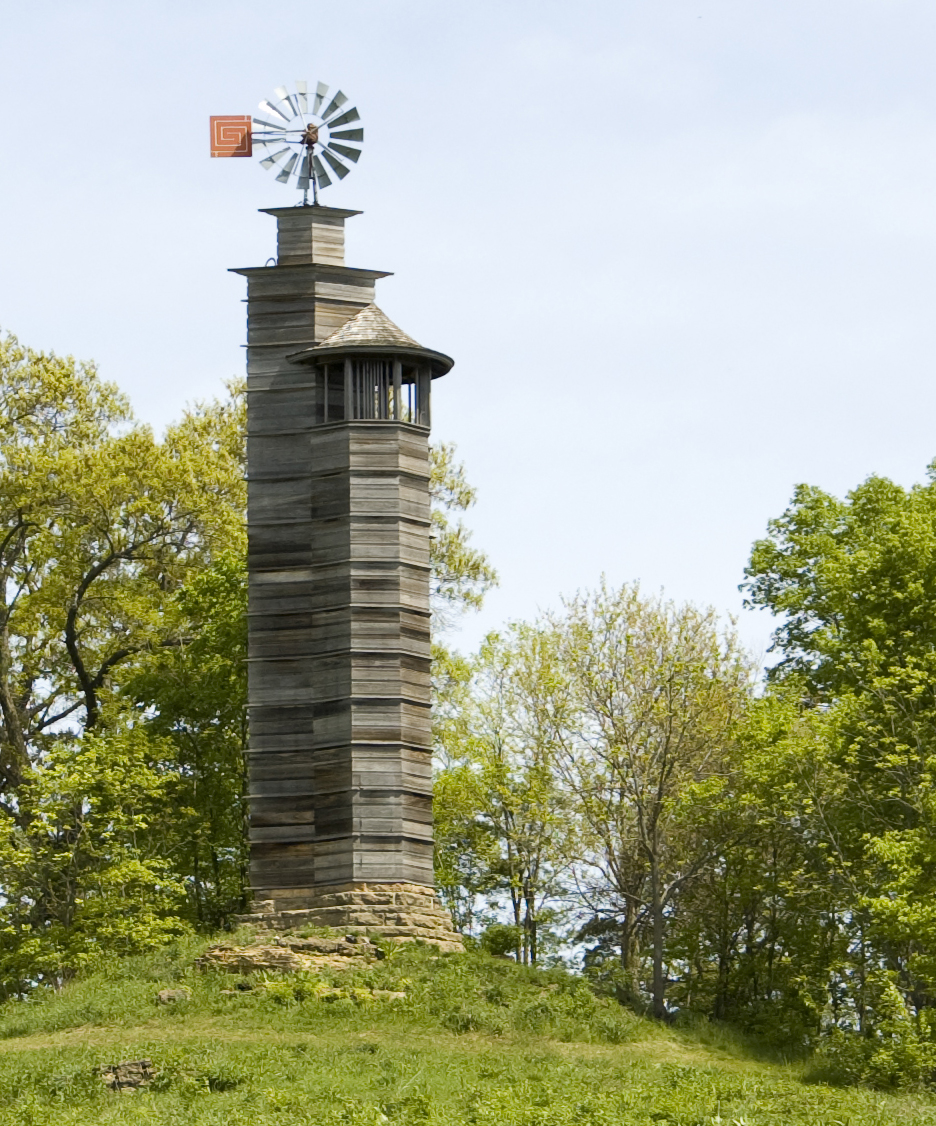
- Romeo and Juliet Windmill on the Taliesin Estate
- Location: south of Spring Green, in Iowa County, Wisconsin
- Coordinates: 43°08′30″N 90°04′15″W
- Built: 1897, 1938, 1992
- Architect: Frank Lloyd Wright
- Architectural style: Prairie School
- Visitation: 25,000 (2019)
- Website: "Romeo and Juliet Windmill".
- NRHP reference No.: 73000081
- Added to NRHP: March 14, 1973

The Romeo and Juliet Windmill is a wooden structure designed by architect Frank Lloyd Wright in the town of Wyoming, Wisconsin (Wyoming is south of the village of Spring Green). The building is on the Taliesin estate and was declared a National Historic Landmark in 1976.

== History ==
The windmill was designed in 1896 after being commissioned by Wright's aunts, Jane and Ellen Lloyd Jones, who needed the windpump to provide water for their school, the Hillside Home School. The diamond-shaped portion of the windmill intersects the portion with the balcony that sits on an octagonal structure. The balcony is accessible through an interior stairway. Wright named these two parts of the building "Romeo" and "Juliet". "Romeo" is the lozenge and "Juliet", the octagon. Architectural historian, Neil Levine explained the principles behind the lozenge and octagon:

[Wright] gave the tower a bold geometric form as a structural solution to the expression of the tower's role as a landmark. The pump rod and support for the wheel are carried up within an acutely angled lozenge shape pointed southeast to deflect blasts of wind like a "storm prow". This angular element is inserted halfway into a larger octagonal volume that contains and supports it throughout nearly its full height. Wright called the composition Romeo and Juliet, likening its conjugate geometry to an amorous union.

After resistance from his uncles about the design, Wright explained the windmill to the aunts:

Of course you had a hard time with Romeo and Juliet. But you know how troublesome they were centuries ago. The principle they represent still causes mischief in the world because it is so vital. Each is indispensable to the other ... neither could stand without the other. Romeo, as you will see, will do all the work and Juliet cuddle alongside to support and exhalt him. Romeo takes the side of the blast and Juliet will entertain the school children. Let's let it go at that.

According to the local Spring Green newspaper, The Weekly Home News, the windmill was completed in 1897. The Romeo and Juliet Windmill was the second structure the aunts commissioned from Wright. The first one, which no longer exists, was Hillside Home School I built in 1887. The third structure designed by Wright for the Hillside Home School was a stone educational facility, the Hillside Home School II, known today as the Hillside Home School, since it is the only one of the two that still exists.

== The Taliesin Historic District ==
Romeo and Juliet is one of five buildings designed by Frank Lloyd Wright on what became his property, which is now known as the Taliesin estate. From the windmill, it is possible to see three of the other structures on the Taliesin estate: his home Taliesin is on an adjacent hill to the north, Tan-y-Deri (his sister's house) is near the windmill's base, and the Hillside Home School is down the hill to windmill's south. Also on the estate is the farming structure, Midway Barn.

== Construction ==
Originally clad in shingles, the windmill was re-clad in cypress board and batten in 1938. Repairs on the windmill were attempted by its owner, the Frank Lloyd Wright Foundation, and restoration was completed in 1992 by the newly formed Taliesin Preservation, Inc., which carries out restoration on the Taliesin estate with assistance from the Frank Lloyd Wright Foundation. The windmill no longer pumps water.

== See also ==
- List of Frank Lloyd Wright works
