= Midway Barn =

Barn in Wyoming, Wisconsin

- U.S. Historic district – Contributing property
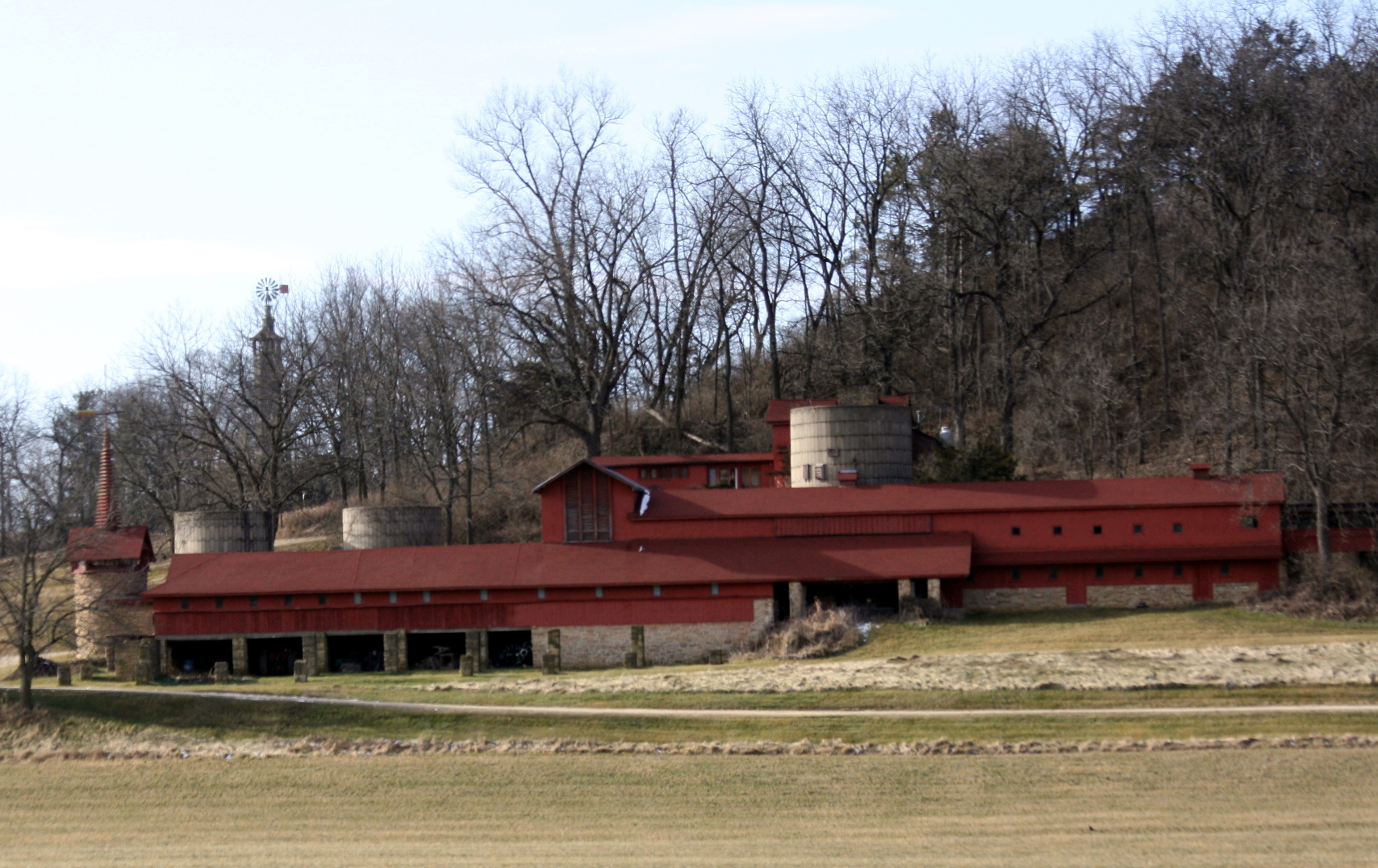
- Midway Barn on the Taliesin Estate
- Location: south of Spring Green, in Iowa County, Wisconsin
- Coordinates: 43°08′30″N 90°04′15″W
- Built: 1920 - 1947
- Architect: Frank Lloyd Wright
- Architectural style: Prairie School
- Visitation: 25,000 (2019)
- Website: "Midway Barns".
- Part of: Taliesin (ID73000081)
- Designated CP: March 14, 1973

Midway Barn was designed by architect Frank Lloyd Wright for farming on his Taliesin estate in the town of Wyoming, Wisconsin (Wyoming is south of the village of Spring Green). The building was designated a National Historic Landmark in 1976.

The barn is actually a T-shaped structure with a total of three levels. The longest portion of the building has two levels, ending on the south in a round stone structure that was originally a milk house. Perpendicular to this was a chicken coop. To the south of the chicken coop are two former silos made out of concrete block. The chicken coop extends over a drive, which ends at an apartment on the north end of the long portion.

== History ==
Midway Barn was used most actively by Wright and his architectural apprentices in the "Taliesin Fellowship" (now the School of Architecture at Taliesin) from the time that the Fellowship began in 1932 until the end of the architect's life in 1959. Midway Barns were constructed mostly in 1938 and were named for their location which was midway between Taliesin and Hillside. Dairy and machine sheds were added in 1947.

The barn at one time had "[T]he Wrights' personal horses, cows, pigs, sheep, chickens, rabbits, [and] an Afghan hound or two", but also had several living spaces, including one for a "sheepherder".

Farming was important to Wright because of his own childhood experiences with it: when he was 11 years old, he began working on the farm, located nearby, owned by his uncle James Lloyd Jones. The architect later wrote that the trees in the surrounding hills "stood in it all like various, beautiful buildings, of more different kinds than all the architectures of the world. And the boy was some day to learn that the secret of all the human styles in architecture was the same that gave character to the trees."

As a result, when Wright began the Taliesin Fellowship he felt that exposing people to farm work, as former apprentice Curtis Besinger later wrote, was "fundamental to a person's development, particularly his understanding and appreciation of an 'organic architecture.'" The farming work was most active during the 1950s.

The animals are no longer on the Taliesin estate, but the farm land is being used for vegetables, as noted in the article quoted from below:

When Wright designed Taliesin, which means "shining brow," he intended it to be surrounded by a vibrant foodscape, according to his writings and architectural drawings.

Wright believed his sustainably designed buildings should be in harmony with their surroundings. His practical ideas about self-sufficiency, rooted in lean times on the farm, are gaining more attention now that sustainable agriculture is in vogue, said Victor Sidy, dean of the Frank Lloyd Wright School of Architecture on the Taliesin estate.

Today, architecture students volunteer to tend the original apple orchard and grapevines placed there by Wright. Students also continue Wright's traditions by growing vegetables in a garden near the school for use in their daily meals. The 33 students are required to help in the school kitchen as part of a collegial tradition.

== Taliesin Historic District ==
Midway Barn is one of five Frank Lloyd Wright-designed buildings on the Taliesin estate. It is on the east side of a low hill, with the four other buildings on the Taliesin estate to its north, south, and west:

- His personal residence, Taliesin, is to the north and west;
- The Hillside Home School, is to the south and west;

And near each other to the west are:

- the Romeo and Juliet Windmill;
- and Tan-y-Deri, the home Wright designed for Jane and Andrew Porter, his sister and brother-in-law.

The buildings and estate are owned by the Frank Lloyd Wright Foundation (centered in Scottsdale, Arizona) with restoration of the buildings and grounds carried out by Taliesin Preservation, Inc., an independent non-profit Wisconsin organization.

== See also ==
- List of Frank Lloyd Wright works
