= Wyoming Valley School =

School building in Wyoming, Wisconsin

- U.S. National Register of Historic Places
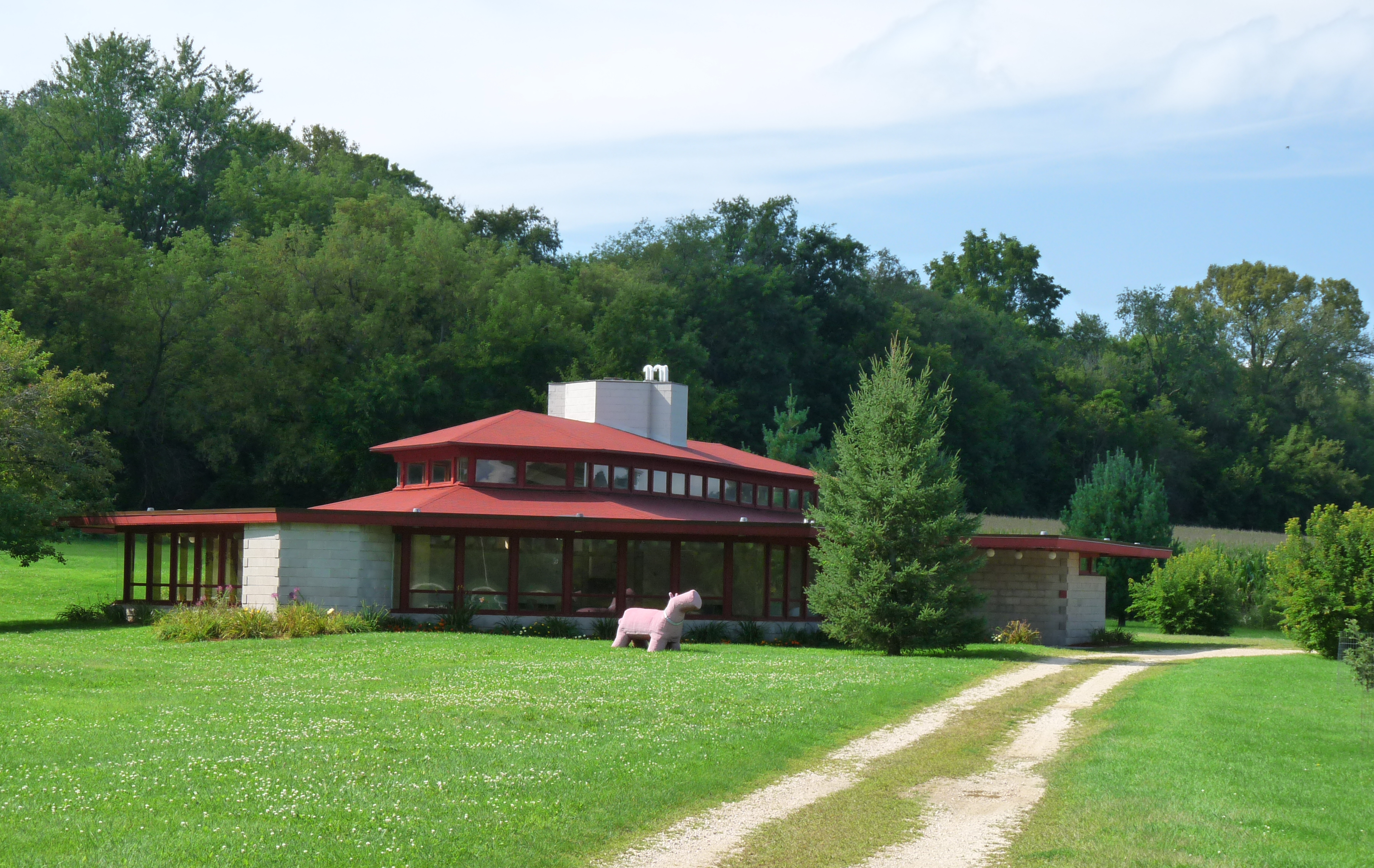
- Wyoming Valley School, August 2016
- Location: 6306 WI Hwy 23; Wyoming (Iowa County), Wisconsin; United States
- Built: 1957
- Architect: Frank Lloyd Wright
- Architectural style: Modern Movement
- NRHP reference No.: 16000377
- Added to NRHP: June 14, 2016

The Wyoming Valley School is a historic school building designed by architect Frank Lloyd Wright in the town of Wyoming in Iowa County, Wisconsin, United States. It is listed on the National Register of Historic Places.

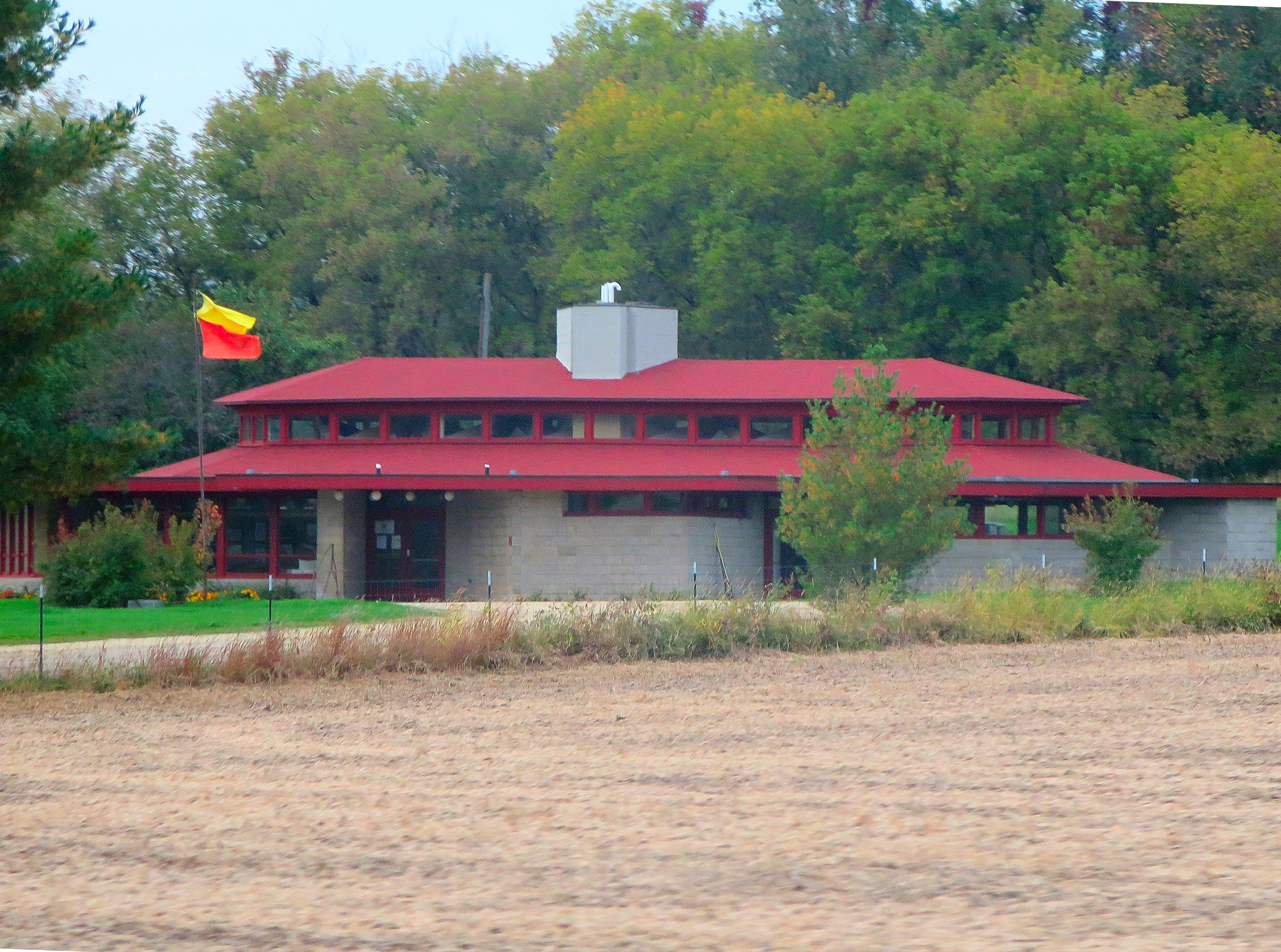
The Wyoming Valley School, October 2013

== History ==
In 1956, the Wyoming school board elected to consolidate its individual schools into one building. As Frank Lloyd Wright's home, Taliesin, was several miles/km away from the proposed site, the school board approached the architect to design their new school building. Wright enthusiastically agreed to do so and donated significant funds to its construction. He would dedicate the assembly room to his mother and her sisters, all of whom were schoolteachers.

The building is a one-story elongated hexagon, with two classrooms on the south side of the building. The Great Room on the north side has a fireplace. The Great Room and classrooms have a clerestory. The north side of the building includes two smaller rooms on the east and west sides that contain the kitchen and teacher's lounge, as well as bathrooms.

The structure has since been converted into a cultural center. It was added to the state and the National Register of Historic Places in 2016.

== See also ==
- List of Frank Lloyd Wright works
- National Register of Historic Places listings in Iowa County, Wisconsin
