= Grady Gammage =

President of Arizona State University (1892–1959)

9th President of Arizona State University
- In office 1933–1959
- Preceded by: Ralph Waldo Swetman
- Succeeded by: Harold D. Richardson

Personal details
- Born: August 5, 1892 Prescott, Arkansas, U.S.
- Died: December 22, 1959 (aged 67) Tempe, Arizona, U.S.
- Education: University of Arizona
- Profession: University President, Educator

Grady Gammage (August 5, 1892 – December 22, 1959) was an American educator. He served as the president of Northern Arizona University from 1926 to 1933 and as the president of Arizona State University from 1933 to 1959. In 1958, he led Arizona State College's victorious Proposition 200 campaign in the state legislature for a name change to Arizona State University. Gammage Auditorium at ASU was named in his honor.

== Biography ==
Born in Southwest Arkansas, Gammage supported himself through grade school after his mother's death. He became a top debater in high school, and while a student attendee at court trials, Gammage caught the attention of a clerk who promoted him as a deputy.

In 1912, Gammage suffered a bout of tuberculosis that forced him to move west. Settling in Arizona, he found employment as a groundskeeper for the University of Arizona. He enrolled as a freshman there and served as a campaign manager for the Prohibition initiative. In 1916, he began his graduate studies and worked part-time for The Post. In 1918, Gammage shifted his studies from law to school administration and, in 1922, he completed a master's degree.

After graduation, Gammage accepted the position of superintendent at Winslow Public Schools. During the summer, he earned extra money teaching sessions at Northern Arizona State Teachers College in Flagstaff. In 1925, Gammage was appointed vice-president of the college and he became president the following year. During his tenure, Gammage raised the standards of achievement for students and faculty, improved campus morale, and developed a sound relationship between campus and community. In 1927, the college awarded him an honorary LL.D.

Gammage was a tireless promoter of the college and, in 1928, the school received official recognition as a Class A four-year teacher training institution and a new name — Arizona State Teacher's College at Flagstaff. In 1930, ASTC was the first school in the Southwest to be granted full accreditation. As economic conditions worsened during The Great Depression, Gammage made it possible for students suffering "hard times" to pay their expenses through barter; dairy cows and potatoes underwrote room and board.

In 1933, Gammage resigned the presidency at ASTC when he accepted the position of president of Arizona State Teachers College at Tempe (later Arizona State University), a post he held until his death in December 1959.
