= Harold D. Richardson =

President of Arizona State University (1902–1993)

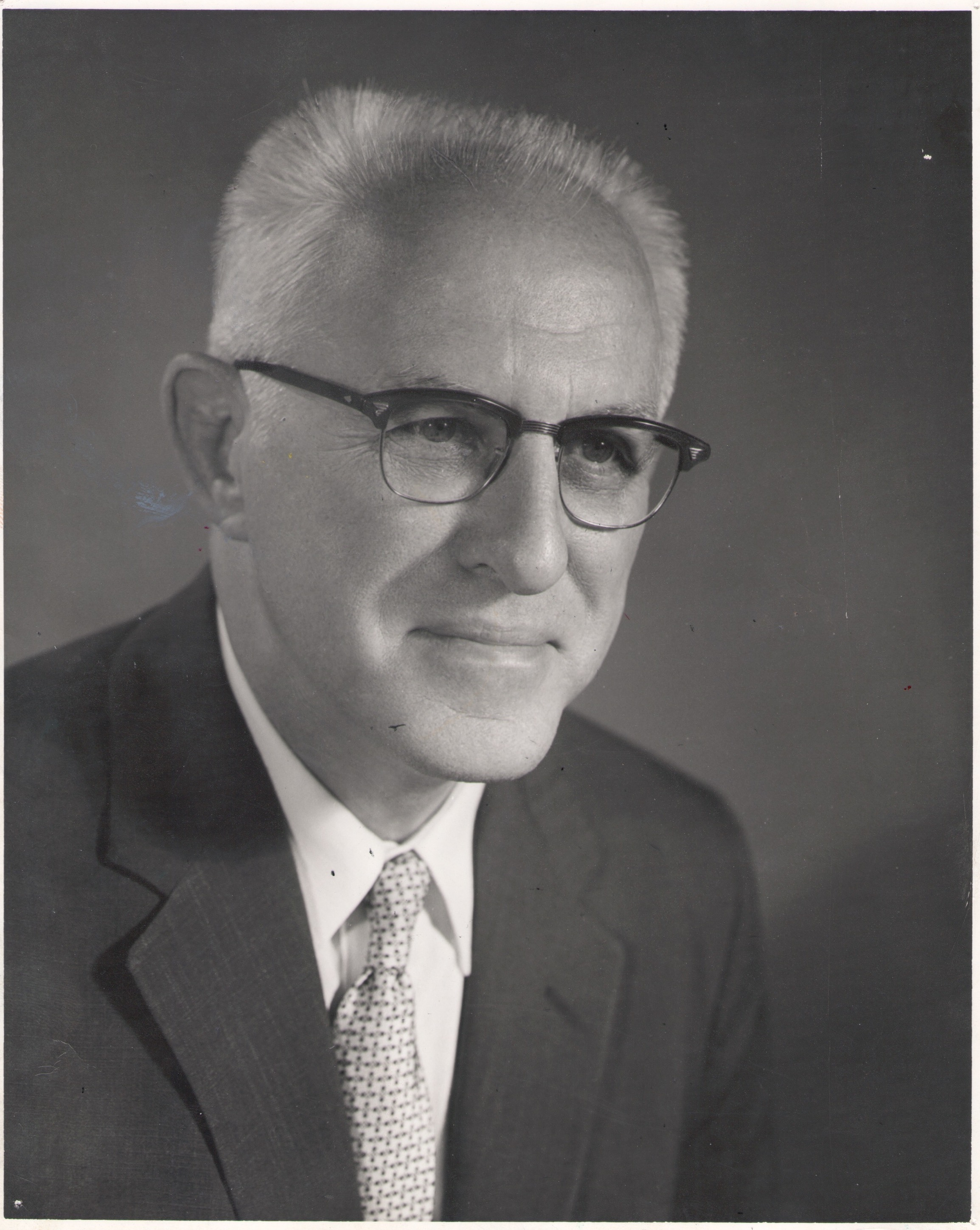

10th President of Arizona State University
- In office 1959–1960
- Preceded by: Grady Gammage
- Succeeded by: G. Homer Durham

Personal details
- Born: 1902 Wyoming, Wisconsin, U.S.
- Died: March 2, 1993 (aged 90–91) Tempe, Arizona, U.S.
- Spouse: Galanda (Benz) Richardson
- Education: Whitewater State Normal School; University of Wisconsin; Northwestern University
- Profession: University President

Harold D. Richardson (1902 – March 2, 1993) was the acting president of Arizona State University (ASU) from December 1959 to the fall of 1960. He also served as ASU's academic vice president and held jobs in various school systems in Wisconsin and Illinois.

== Life and work ==
Richardson was born on a farm in the Town of Wyoming, Wisconsin, and initially attended a one-room country school. The family moved to Spring Green for high school, and after his graduation, Richardson worked at a factory in Freeport, Illinois. The next year, he headed for Whitewater State Normal School and studied to become a principal.

After graduation, he held jobs in various school systems in Darien, Wisconsin and then pursued further education at the University of Wisconsin in Madison, where he received his bachelor's and master's degrees, and Northwestern University, where he received his doctorate.

== Arizona State ==
In 1939, while Richardson was director of research at the Deerfield-Shields Township High School District in Highland Park and Lake Forest, Illinois, Grady Gammage interviewed him and hired him as director of graduate studies at what was then known as Arizona State College at Tempe. Six years later, Richardson was named dean of instruction, and in 1953, he was tapped to become the academic vice president. In this position, he oversaw the conversion of a teachers college to university organization, which occurred in the lead-up to Arizona State gaining university status in 1958.

On December 23, 1959, Gammage's sudden death obligated Richardson to become the school's acting president, effective the next day. He was the first new leader of ASU since Gammage had taken office in 1933. Though he served in an acting role, he is considered tenth in the succession of ASU presidents. He remained in this position until September 1960, when the Arizona Board of Regents selected G. Homer Durham to become president. Richardson returned to his regular position, and in 1963, he resumed active duties as a professor of education.

His daughter, Beverly (Richardson) Rousculp, and two of his three grandchildren, Tiffany Rousculp and Michael Rousculp, graduated from Arizona State University.

He died on March 2, 1993, in Tempe.
