= Albert Richardson (Wisconsin politician) =

American politician

Albert Darling Richardson (September 3, 1864 – October 28, 1937) was an American farmer and politician.

Born in the town of Wyoming, Iowa County, Wisconsin, Richardson went to Dodgeville High School. He was a farmer. Richardson served on the school board. He also served as chairman of the Wyoming Town Board and also served on the Iowa County Board of Supervisors. In 1913, Richardson served in the Wisconsin State Assembly and was a Republican. Richardson died in a hospital in Madison, Wisconsin following an operation.
