= Ralph Waldo Swetman =

American educator (1886–1957)

4th President of State University of New York at Oswego
- In office 1933–1947
- Preceded by: James C. Riggs
- Succeeded by: Harvey M. Rice

8th President of Arizona State University
- In office 1930–1933
- Preceded by: Arthur John Matthews
- Succeeded by: Grady Gammage

2nd President of California State Polytechnic University, Humboldt
- In office 1924–1930
- Preceded by: Nelson Blieau Van Matr
- Succeeded by: Arthur Gist

Personal details
- Born: November 10, 1886 Camden, New York, U.S.
- Died: 1957 (aged 70–71) Barbados
- Education: Hamilton College; Columbia University
- Profession: University President, Educator

Ralph Waldo Swetman (November 10, 1886 – 1957) was an American educator and president of several teachers colleges in the 1920s, 1930s and 1940s.

== Life ==
Swetman was born on November 10, 1886, at a farm near Camden, New York. He attended Camden High School and spent a year at Colgate Academy before transferring to Hamilton College. He graduated from Hamilton College in 1907 with a Phi Beta Kappa key.

He had several principalships in New York, first in New York Mills and then in Groton, followed by a return to Camden and four years at Palmyra. There, he met and married Alice Pierson. After Palmyra, he went to Teachers College at Columbia University to obtain his master's degree.

=== Washington ===
After completing his master's, Swetman became the director of training at the Washington State Normal School in Ellensburg, Washington. He then joined the US Army, and on his return, he headed up the school's extension service. In 1921, Swetman was elected president of the Washington State Education Association and took particular interest in the issue of school equalization. This embarrassed the Normal School, and Swetman felt he could not give up the cause, so he resigned. Later, he was hired by a campaign that successfully brought equalization to the state's schools.

=== California ===
After his success in Washington state, Swetman became a fellow at Stanford University, during which time he produced a book on California school law that was used by many schools in the state. In 1924, he took up the presidency at Humboldt State Teachers College in Arcata, California. In his six years at Humboldt, he helped repair relations between Arcata and Eureka, which had been bypassed as the location of the normal school. In academics, Swetman introduced a grade point average system, academic probation, and an honor roll and raised qualifications for full-time faculty members. Meanwhile, the school grew in other ways; a women's athletic association was created in 1925, and Humboldt staged its first intercollegiate football contest in 1927.

At this time, he also accepted a summer assignment at the territorial normal school at Honolulu, Hawaii, now part of the University of Hawaii at Manoa.

=== Tempe State ===
In January 1930, Swetman resigned at Humboldt State to succeed the retiring Arthur John Matthews and become the eighth president of Tempe State Teachers College. In his three years as president, the school doubled its enrollment to cross the 1,000-student threshold. He focused on the development of good teacher-training programs and attempted to build a student-centered institution. He also conceived of a self-supported summer session at the school.

=== Oswego State ===
In 1933, Swetman left Tempe to head the Oswego State Normal School in Oswego, New York; he was its fourth principal. He was sought at this time by two normal schools in New York, and when asked which one was the greater challenge to lead, he replied, "Oswego".

The Swetman administration, which lasted until 1947, confronted an institution that had lagged in adapting to higher educational standards. In 1926, the American Association of Teachers Colleges increased its standards and thus kept teachers colleges par with liberal arts schools in regards to faculty preparation. However, Oswego State had just one doctorate on faculty; more than half had no degrees. Swetman ordered that no faculty member who did not get a master's degree would stay beyond 1935, and he also made it clear that he wanted more men on staff. Many of the longtime faculty of the school resigned in response, but the effect of the decision was to catapult Oswego State into the top 20% of teachers colleges in the country. Other necessary improvements came in the school's physical plant; new buildings were added, such as Park Hall, and new athletic fields were also built.

Swetman's time included new highs and new lows; under his guidance, Oswego State established its first extension service, and in 1940, the school granted its first industrial arts degree. Swetman also advocated for the conversion of New York's normal schools, including Oswego State, to teachers colleges, which occurred in 1942. However, he also had to confront a sharp drop in enrollment associated with World War II. In order to meet this challenge, Swetman brought an Air Corps unit to Oswego in 1943. He did so by bypassing the state government and negotiating a contract directly in Washington; the state government was none too pleased until it realized that Swetman's gamble had saved his staff. Oswego State lost no positions, and it educated 808 cadets. On another occasion, he had to defend his school from a state proposal to consolidate the industrial arts department at Buffalo.

=== Retirement and death ===
In 1947, Swetman retired from Oswego, having suffered serious physical fatigue, including a severe heart attack on November 3, 1946. He would later make an excursion into politics in Boca Raton, Florida, even running for mayor there, before moving again to Coconut Grove, Florida. He died in 1957 in Barbados, where he was on vacation with his wife. He was survived by a son and two daughters.

Buildings were named for Swetman at Humboldt (the Swetman Child Development Lab which is now the Swetman Makerspace) and SUNY Oswego (Swetman Hall, completed in 1963). The latter building no longer exists separately, having been folded into the larger Campus Center.
