= Taliesin (studio) =

Studio and home in Spring Green, Wisconsin

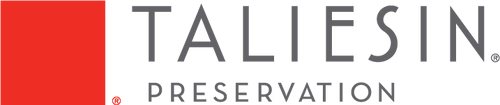

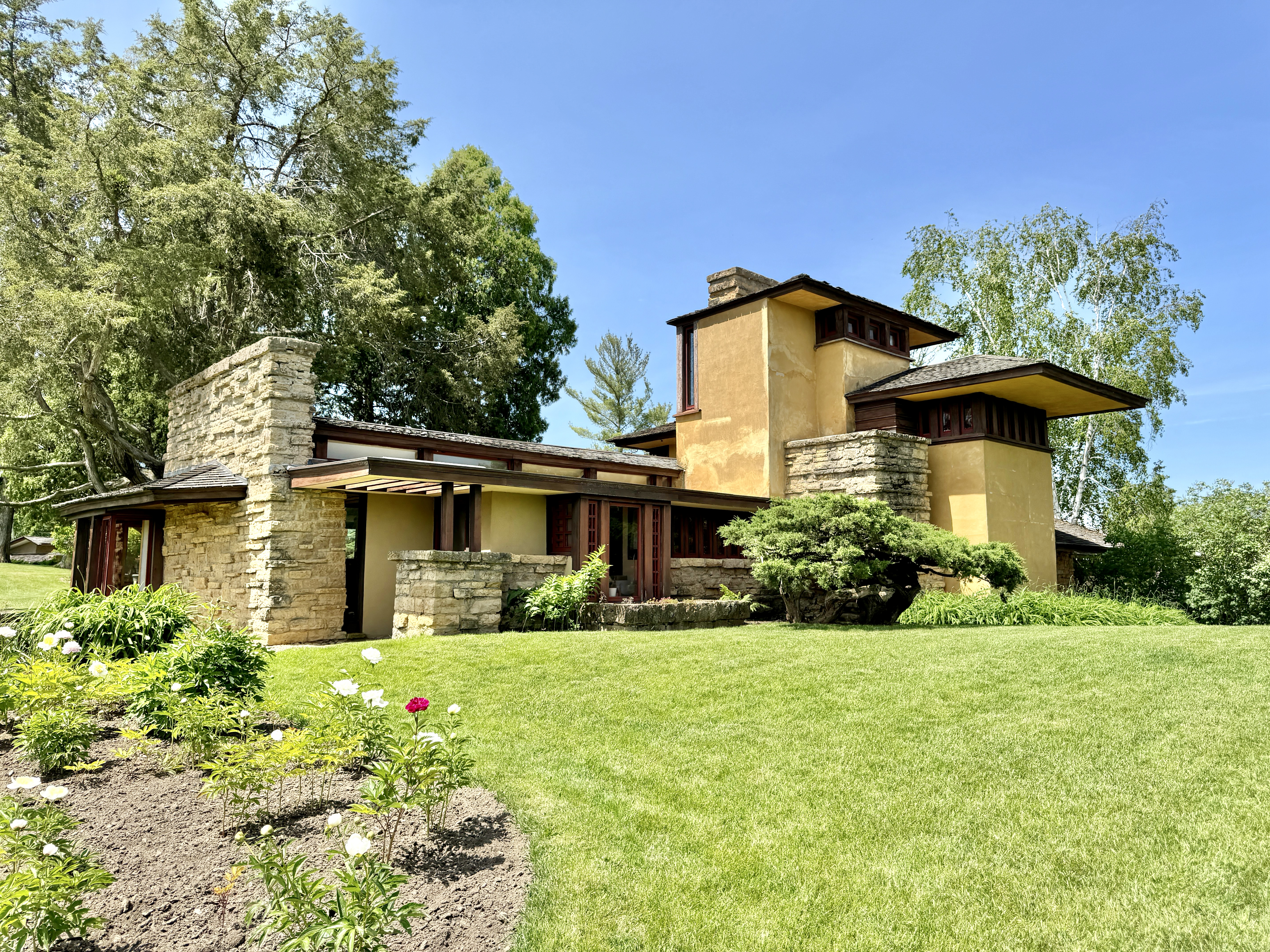
- A portion of the building seen from the south in 2024.
- Interactive map showing Taliesin's location

General information
- Location: 5607 County Road C, Spring Green, Wisconsin, U.S. 53588
- Coordinates: 43°08′28″N 90°04′14″W
- Year built: 1911–1959
- Owner: Frank Lloyd Wright Foundation

Technical details
- Size: 37,000 square feet (3,400 m^{2}) (interior of main building); 75,000 square feet (7,000 m^{2}) (interior of all buildings); 600 acres (240 ha) (estate)

Design and construction
- Architect: Frank Lloyd Wright

Site notes
- Visitors: 25,000 (in 2023)

UNESCO World Heritage Site
- Criteria: Cultural: (ii)
- Designated: 2019 (43rd session)
- Part of: The 20th-Century Architecture of Frank Lloyd Wright
- Reference no.: 1496-003
- Region: North America

U.S. National Register of Historic Places
- Designated: March 14, 1973
- Reference no.: 73000081

U.S. National Historic Landmark
- Designated: January 7, 1976

Taliesin (/ˌtæliːˈɛsɪn/ tal-ee-ESS-in; sometimes known as Taliesin East, Taliesin Spring Green, or Taliesin North, after 1937) is a house-studio complex located 2.5 miles (4.0 km) south of the village of Spring Green, Wisconsin, United States. Developed and occupied by American architect Frank Lloyd Wright, the 600-acre (240 ha) estate is an exemplar of the Prairie School of architecture. Wright began developing the estate in 1911 close to land that previously belonged to his maternal family.

Wright designed the main Taliesin home and studio with his mistress, Mamah Borthwick, after leaving his first wife and home and studio in Oak Park, Illinois. The design of the original building was consistent with the design principles of the Prairie School, emulating the flatness of the plains and the natural limestone outcroppings of Wisconsin's Driftless Area. The structure (which included agricultural and studio wings) was completed in 1911. The name Taliesin, meaning "shining brow" in Welsh, was initially used for the first building, which was built on and into the brow of a hill; it was later extended to the entire estate.

Over the course of Wright's occupancy, two major fires led to significant alterations; these three stages are referred to as Taliesin I, II, and III. In 1914, after a disturbed employee set fire to the living quarters and murdered Borthwick and six others, Wright rebuilt the Taliesin residential wing, but he used the second estate only sparingly, returning there in 1922 following the completion of the Imperial Hotel, Tokyo. An electrical fire gutted Taliesin II's living quarters in April 1925, and he rebuilt it later that year. Wright lost the house to foreclosure in 1927 but was able to reacquire it the next year, with financial help from friends. In 1932, he established a fellowship for architectural students at the estate. Taliesin III was Wright's home for the rest of his life, although he began to spend the winters at Taliesin West in Scottsdale, Arizona, upon its completion in 1937. Many of Wright's acclaimed buildings were designed at Taliesin, including Fallingwater, the Jacobs I house, the Johnson Wax Headquarters, and the Solomon R. Guggenheim Museum. Wright, who was also an avid collector of Asian art, used Taliesin as a storehouse and private museum.

Wright left Taliesin and the 600-acre Taliesin Estate to the Frank Lloyd Wright Foundation (founded by him and his third wife in 1940) upon his death in 1959. This organization oversaw renovations to the estate until 1990, when a nonprofit organization known as Taliesin Preservation Inc. (TPI) took over responsibility. During the 1990s and 2000s, TPI renovated the estate to repair deterioration that took place over the years. As of 2023, more than 25,000 people visit Taliesin each year. The Taliesin estate was designated a National Historic Landmark in 1976, and it was listed as a World Heritage Site in 2019 as part of a group of eight listings known as "The 20th-Century Architecture of Frank Lloyd Wright".

== Site ==
Jones Valley, the Wisconsin River valley in which Taliesin sits, was formed during Pre-Illinoian glaciation. This region of North America, known as the Driftless Area, was totally surrounded by ice during Wisconsin glaciation, but the area itself was not glaciated. The result is an unusually hilly landscape with deeply carved river valleys.

The valley, approximately 2.5 miles (4.0 km) south of the village of Spring Green, Wisconsin, was originally settled by Frank Lloyd Wright's maternal grandfather, Richard Lloyd Jones. Jones had emigrated with his family from Wales, moving to the town of Ixonia in Jefferson County, Wisconsin. In 1858, Jones and the family moved from Ixonia to this part of Wisconsin to start a farm. By the 1870s, Jones' sons had taken over operation of the farm, and they invited Wright to work during summers as a farmhand.

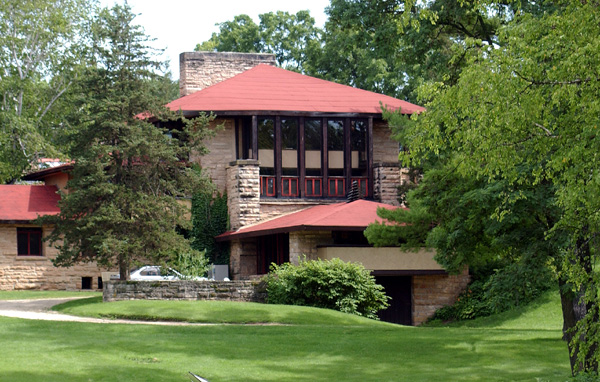
Wright designed the second Hillside Home School in 1901, alongside an earlier school he designed in 1887.

Wright's aunts Jane and Ellen C. Lloyd Jones (known as Jennie and Nell) began a co-educational school, the Hillside Home School, on the farm in 1887 and let Wright design the building; this was Wright's first independent commission. In 1896, Wright's aunts again commissioned Wright, this time to build a windmill. The resulting Romeo and Juliet Windmill was unorthodox but stable. By 1901 the school role was such that the original building was inadequate, and Wright was commissioned to design a replacement. This became Hillside Home School II, and Wright later sent several of his children to the school. Wright's final commission on the farm was Tan-y-Deri, a house for his sister Jane Porter, completed in 1907. Tan-y-Deri, Welsh for "under the oaks", was a design based on his recent Ladies Home Journal article "A Fireproof House for $5000". The family, their ideas, religion, and ideals, greatly influenced the young Wright, who later changed his middle name from Lincoln (in honor of Abraham Lincoln) to Lloyd in deference to his mother's family.

== Etymology ==
When Wright decided to construct a home in this valley, he chose the name of the Welsh bard Taliesin, whose name means "shining brow" or "radiant brow". Wright learned of the poet through Richard Hovey's Taliesin: A Masque, a story about an artist's struggle for identity. The Welsh name also suited Wright's roots, as the Lloyd Joneses gave Welsh names to their properties. The hill upon which Taliesin was built was a favorite from Wright's youth; he saw the house as a "shining brow" on the hill, in hope of a place of refuge "but I had forgotten grandfather Isiah's punishments and beatings". Although the name was originally only applied to the house, Wright later used the term to refer to the entire property. Wright and others used roman numerals to distinguish the three versions of the house.

== Early history ==
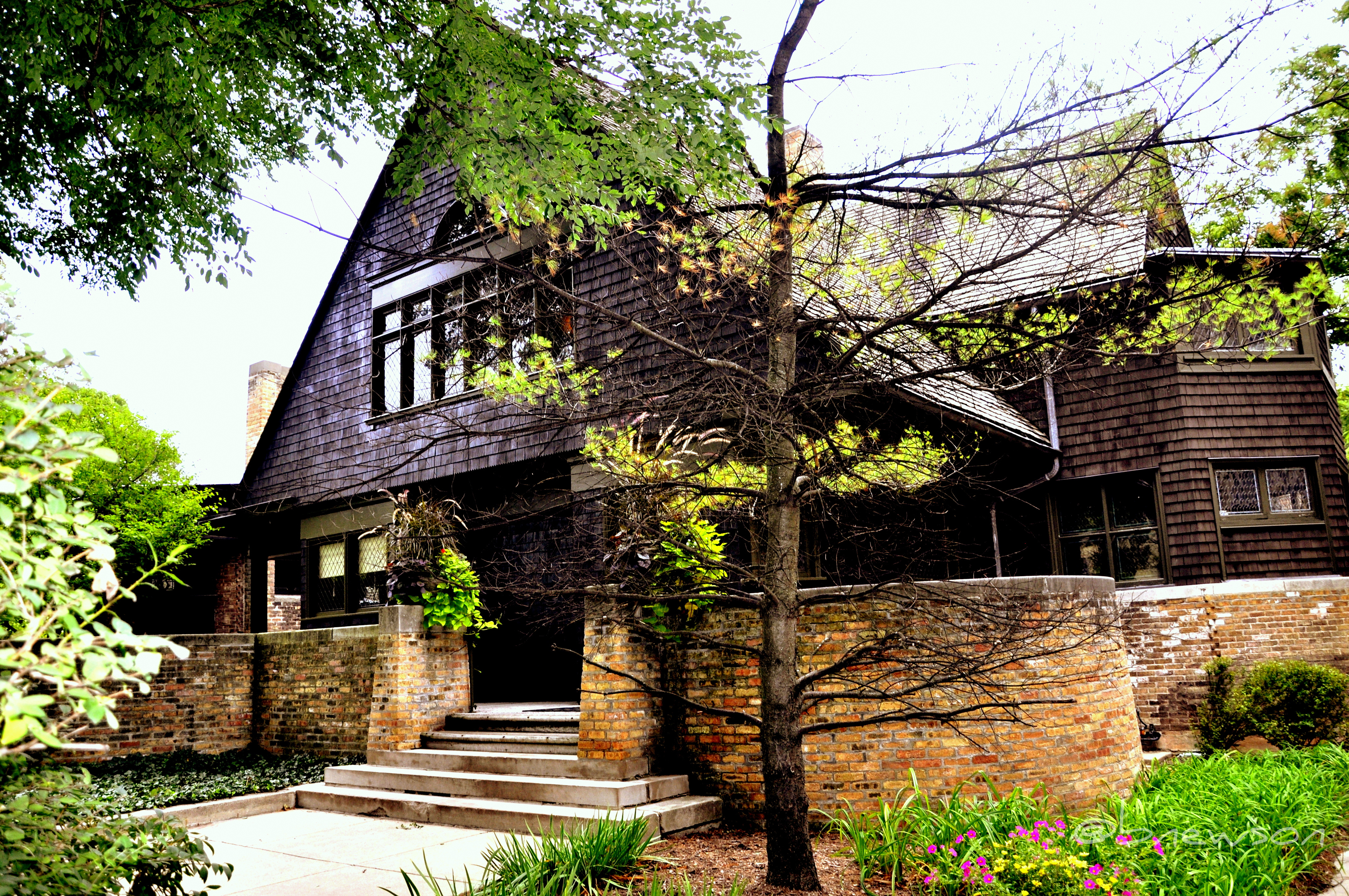
Wright's home and studio in Oak Park, Illinois. The house was built in 1889, while the studio was built in 1898.

The Frank Lloyd Wright Home and Studio in Oak Park, Illinois, was Wright's residence from 1889 to 1909. He built an architectural studio next to his Oak Park house in 1898. In Oak Park, Wright had developed his concept of Prairie School architecture, designing houses primarily for local clients. In 1903, Wright began designing a home for Edwin Cheney, but quickly took a liking for Cheney's wife. Wright and Mamah Borthwick Cheney began an affair and separated from their spouses in 1909.

In October, Borthwick, having left her husband in the summer, met up with Wright in New York City. From there, they sailed to Berlin, so Wright could negotiate a portfolio of his work. After that, Wright and Borthwick parted temporarily. She had settled in Leipzig, Germany, teaching English, and Wright settled in Italy to continue work on the portfolio. Borthwick joined Wright in Italy in February. He moved his studio to Fiesole, a town within view of Florence. While in Fiesole, Wright was particularly inspired by Michelozzo's Villa Medici because it was built into a hill, had commanding views of its surroundings, and featured gardens on two levels. In 1910, the pair sought to return to the United States, but knew they could not escape scandal if they returned together to Oak Park. Wright saw an alternative—his family's ancestral land near Spring Green, Wisconsin. Wright returned alone to the United States in October 1910, publicly reconciling with his wife, Catherine, while working to secure money to buy land on which to build a house for himself and Borthwick Cheney. On April 3, 1911, Wright wrote to client, Darwin D. Martin, requesting money so that he could "see about building a small house" for his mother.

On the 10th, Wright's mother Anna signed the deed for the property. By using Anna's name, Wright was able to secure the 31.5-acre (12.7 ha) property without attracting any attention to the affair. Late in the summer, Mamah Borthwick (having divorced Cheney and legally reverting to her maiden name) quietly moved into the property, staying with Wright's sister, Jane Porter, at her home, Tan-y-Deri. However, Wright and Borthwick's new property was discovered by a Chicago Examiner reporter that fall, and the affair made headlines in the Chicago Tribune on Christmas Eve.

== Taliesin I ==
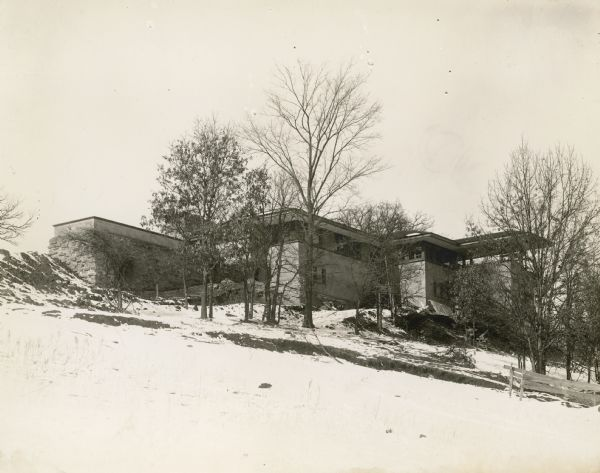
An early photograph of Taliesin, taken during its first winter, 1911–12

At Taliesin, Wright wanted to live in unison with Mamah, his ancestry, and with nature. He chose only local building materials. The house was designed to nestle against the hill, in an example of Wright's "organic architecture". The bands of windows, one of his trademarks, allow nature to enter the house, and the fluid transitions from interior to exterior were radical for the time. This was in keeping with Wright's belief that the architecture should be "of" the hill, not "on" it. "I attend the greatest of churches. I spell nature with a capital N. That is my church", he said in a TV interview in 1957.

=== Architecture and layout ===
Taliesin I was composed of several partially detached structures in an "L"-shaped arrangement, which were connected by pergolas. There were three sections: a long section on the east, which held the residential wing (where Wright and Borthwick lived); a long section on the west, which held the agricultural wing; and an office wing connecting the two other sections. To the southwest of the main complex was a courtyard; there were stables, service functions, servants' quarters, and a garage across the courtyard. The one-story complex was accessed by a road leading up the hill to the rear of the building. The estate gateway was on County Road C, just west of Wisconsin Road 23. Iron entry gates were flanked by limestone piers capped with planter urns.

A porte-cochère or loggia, above the main entrance of the living quarters, provided shelter for visiting automobiles. The residential wing included a bedroom and a combined living–dining room, which protruded from the corner of the hill on two sides. The office wing held the drafting studio and workroom, and an apartment for the head draftsman. This apartment may have originally been intended for Wright's mother. Typical of a Prairie School design, the house was, as Wright described, "low, wide, and snug". As with most of his houses, Wright designed the furniture.

Wright chose yellow limestone for the house from a quarry of outcropping ledges on a nearby hill. Local farmers helped Wright move the stone up the Taliesin hill. Stones were laid in long, thin ledges, evoking the natural way that they were found in the quarry and across the Driftless Area. Plaster for the interior walls was mixed with sienna, giving the finished product a golden hue. This caused the plaster to resemble the sand on the banks of the nearby Wisconsin River. The outside plaster walls were similar, but mixed with cement, resulting in a grayer color. Windows were placed so that sun could come through openings in every room at every point of the day. Wright chose not to install gutters so that icicles would form in winter. The hip roof had a wood frame with shingles made of cedar; the shingles were intended to weather to a silver-grey color, matching the branches of nearby trees. The finished house measured approximately 12,000 square feet (1,100 m^{2}) of enclosed space.

=== Life at Taliesin ===
Upon moving in with Borthwick in the winter of 1911, Wright resumed work on his architectural projects, but he struggled to secure commissions because of the ongoing negative publicity over his affair with Borthwick (whose ex-husband, Edwin Cheney, maintained primary custody of their son and daughter). However, Wright did produce some of his most acclaimed works during this time period, including the Midway Gardens in Chicago and the Avery Coonley Playhouse in Riverside. He also indulged his hobby for collecting Japanese art, and quickly became a renowned authority. Borthwick translated four works from Swedish difference feminist Ellen Key.

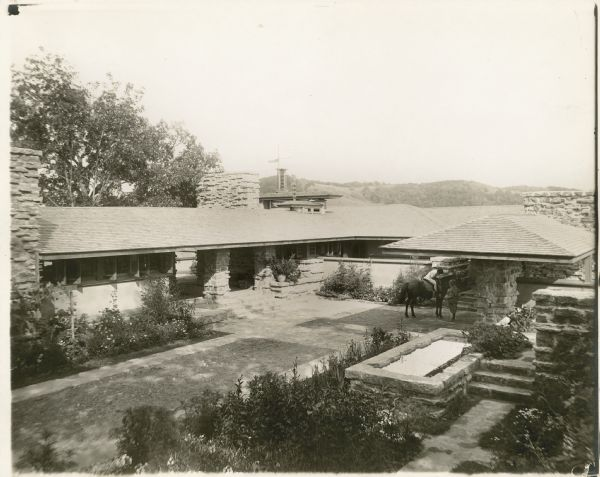
The courtyard of the completed complex as seen from the tea circle in the summer of 1912. The studio is to the left and the living quarters are to the right; the loggia is in between.

Wright designed the gardens with the assistance of landscape architect, Jens Jensen. This included over a thousand fruit trees and bushes ordered in 1912. Wright requested two hundred and eighty-five apple trees planted, including one hundred McIntosh, fifty Wealthy, fifty Golden Russet, and fifty Fameuse. Among the bushes were three hundred gooseberry, two hundred blackberry, and two hundred raspberry. The property also grew pears, asparagus, rhubarb, and plums. It is unknown exactly how many were planted, because part of the orchard was destroyed during a railroad strike.

The fruit and vegetable plants were placed along the contour of the estate, which may have been done to mimic the farms he saw while in Italy. Wright also dammed a creek on the property to create an artificial lake, which was stocked with fish and aquatic fowl. This water garden, probably inspired by the ones he saw in Japan, created a natural gateway to the property.

In 1912, Wright designed what he called a "tea circle" in the middle of the courtyard, adjacent to the crown of the hill. This circle was heavily inspired by Jens Jensen's council circles, but also took influence from Japanese wabi-sabi landscape architecture. Unlike Jensen's circles, the rough-cut limestone tea circle was much larger and featured a pool in the center. The circle featured a curved stone bench flanked with Chinese jars built during the Ming Dynasty. The tea circle had two oak trees: one on the inner edge of the seating areas, and one just outside of the stone seat. The remaining oak tree (outside of the stone seat) blew down in a storm in 1998. The tea garden also included a large plaster replica of Flower in the Crannied Wall, a statue originally designed by Richard Bock for the Susan Lawrence Dana House, by Wright. The statue's namesake poem is inscribed on its rear.

=== 1914 attack and fire ===
Julian Carlton was a 31-year-old man who came to work as a chef and servant at Taliesin for the summer. He was an African-American possibly mixed with Afro-Caribbean and West Indian descent and born on January 14, 1883 (although some sources, including his grave, say he was born in 1884), in Birmingham, Alabama. Author Paul Hendrickson states that extensive historical research shows the Caribbean ancestry to be a myth although Carlton likely had a mixed race background.

He was recommended to Wright by John Vogelsong Jr., the caterer for the Midway Gardens project. Carlton and his wife Gertrude, who was born on May 26, 1886, in Racine, Wisconsin, had previously served in the house of Vogelsong's parents in Chicago. Originally a genial presence on the estate, Carlton sometimes grew increasingly paranoid. He sometimes stayed up late at night with a butcher knife, looking out the window. This behavior had been noticed by Wright and Borthwick, who issued an ad in a local paper for a replacement cook. Carlton was given notice that August 15, 1914 would be his last day in their employ.

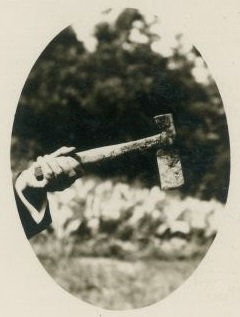
The hatchet used in the Taliesin attacks

Before he left, Carlton plotted to kill Taliesin's workers and residents. His primary target was draftsman Emil Brodelle, who had falsely and racially abused Carlton on August 12 for not following an order. Brodelle and Carlton also engaged in a minor physical confrontation two days later. He planned the assault, targeting the noon hour, when Borthwick, her visiting children, and the studio personnel would be on opposite sides of Taliesin's living quarters awaiting lunch. Wright was away in Chicago completing Midway Gardens while Borthwick stayed at home with her two children, 11-year-old John and 8-year-old Martha. As only two survived that day and there was no criminal trial, the sequence of events have been posited based on details from the two survivors (William Weston and Herbert Fritz), and evidence found at the scene.

On August 15, Carlton grabbed a shingling hatchet and began an attack. It is believed that he started with Borthwick and two of her children, John and Martha—who were waiting on the porch off the living room—as they were the most vulnerable of his targets. Apparently, Mamah Borthwick was killed by a single blow to the head, and her son John was killed as he sat in his chair. Martha managed to flee, but was hunted down and killed in the courtyard. Carlton then coated the bodies in gasoline and set them on fire, setting the house ablaze. He then attacked the living quarters where the staff were situated, pouring gasoline underneath the door of the far end of the quarters and setting them on fire. Draftsman Herbert Fritz managed to break open a window and escape, though he broke his arm in the process. Carlton mortally wounded Brodelle, and then attacked the other occupants.

With the house empty and people wounded, Carlton ran to the basement and into a fireproof furnace chamber. He had brought a small vial of hydrochloric acid with him and attempted suicide by swallowing it, but survived. Together, Lindblom and Weston ran to a neighboring farm to send the alert of the attack. Weston then returned to Taliesin and used a garden hose to help extinguish the flames. His efforts saved the studio (with many of Wright's drawings and manuscripts), as well as the agricultural part of the building. Eventually, neighbors arrived to assist in putting out the fire, to tend to survivors, and search for the murderer. Gertrude was found in a nearby field, apparently unaware of her husband's intentions. She was dressed in travel clothes, expecting to catch a train to Chicago with Julian to seek a new job.

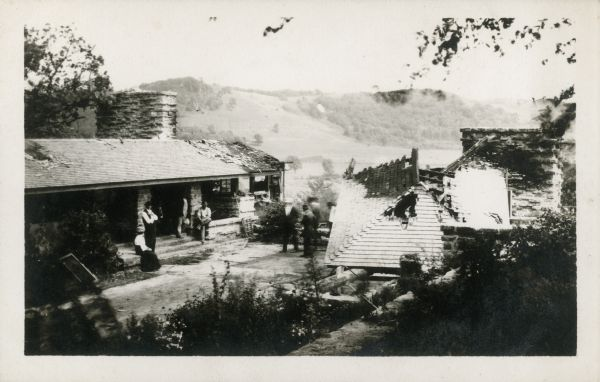
It is believed the man on the left is Frank Lloyd Wright, surveying the damage after the fire.

Later in the afternoon, Sheriff John Williams located Carlton and arrested him. Carlton was transferred to the county jail in Dodgeville. Gertrude was released from police custody shortly after the incident. She was sent to Chicago with $7 (equivalent to $225 in 2025) and was never heard from again. The hydrochloric acid that Carlton ingested had badly burnt his esophagus, which made it difficult for him to ingest food. Carlton was indicted on August 16 and was charged with the murder of Emil Brodelle, the only death that was directly witnessed by a survivor. Carlton pleaded not guilty. On October 7, before the case could be heard, Carlton died of esophagitis in his cell. Wright's biographers in the 20th century tended not to discuss the Taliesin massacre; one biography dedicated only one paragraph to the attacks, while another said obliquely that the "incident marked a rupture in Wright's career". The Taliesin murders remained relatively obscure until the 2000s, when two books about the attacks were published.

=== Aftermath ===
The fire destroyed the living areas, but the agriculture wing and the drafting studio survived largely intact. The bodies of the dead and injured were brought to Tan-y-Deri, the nearby home of Wright's sister, Jane Porter. The dead were Mamah and Brodelle, with John missing (his remains were later found incinerated). Martha Cheney, foreman Thomas Brunker, and Ernest Weston (13-year-old son of William Weston) would die later that day or that night. Gardener David Lindblom survived until August 18 (Tuesday morning). Wright returned to Taliesin that night with his son John and Edwin Cheney. Cheney brought the remains of his children back to Chicago while Wright buried Mamah Borthwick on the grounds of nearby Unity Chapel (the chapel of the mother's side of his family). Heartbroken over the loss of his lover, Wright did not mark the grave because he could not bear to be reminded of the tragedy. He also did not hold a funeral service for Borthwick, although he did fund and attend his employees' services.

Wright struggled with the loss of Borthwick, experiencing symptoms of conversion disorder, insomnia, weight loss, and temporary blindness. After a few months of recovery, aided by his sister Jane Porter, Wright moved to an apartment he rented in Chicago at 25 East Cedar Street. The attack also had a profound effect on Wright's design principles; biographer Robert Twombly writes that his Prairie School period ended after the loss of Borthwick.

== Taliesin II ==
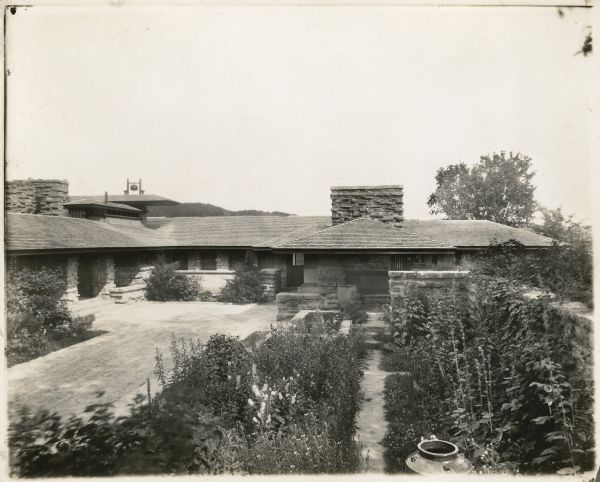
The courtyard of Taliesin II

Shortly after the Taliesin massacre, Wright declared his intention to rebuild the complex. Within a few months of his recovery, Wright began rebuilding Taliesin, naming the rebuilt structure "Taliesin II":

There is release from anguish in action. Anguish would not leave Taliesin until action for renewal began. Again, and at once, all that had been in motion before at the will of the architect was set in motion. Steadily, again, stone by stone, board by board, Taliesin the II began to rise from Taliesin the first.

The new complex was mostly identical to the original building and was constructed on the ruins of Taliesin I. Similarly to the original complex, Taliesin II was arranged around a set of terraces and courtyards. The dam (which burst less than a week after the murders) was rebuilt. Wright added an observation platform, perhaps inspired by the one he designed in Baraboo. Later, he built a hydroelectric generator in an unsuccessful effort to make Taliesin completely self-sufficient. The generator was built in the style of a Japanese temple. Within only a few years, parts of the structure eroded away. It was demolished in the 1940s.

Around Christmas time of 1914, while designing the residence after the first devastating fire, Wright received a sympathetic letter from "Maude" Miriam Noel, who contacted him after reading about the Taliesin fire and murders. Wright exchanged correspondence with the wealthy divorcee and met with her at his Chicago office. Wright was quickly infatuated, and the two began a relationship. By spring 1915, Taliesin II was completed and Noel moved there with Wright. Wright's first wife Catherine finally granted him a divorce in 1922, meaning that Wright could marry Noel a year later. Although Wright admired Noel's erratic personality at first, her behavior (later identified as schizophrenia) led to a miserable life together at Taliesin. Noel left Wright by the spring of 1924.

In the new Taliesin, Wright worked to repair his tarnished reputation. Already in 1916, he had secured a commission to design the Imperial Hotel in Tokyo, Japan; when the building was undamaged following the Great Kantō earthquake of 1923, Wright's reputation was restored. Although he later expanded the agricultural wing, Wright spent little time at the second Taliesin house, often living near his construction sites abroad. Instead of serving as a full-time residence, Wright treated Taliesin like an art museum for his collection of Asian works. Wright only truly lived at Taliesin II starting in 1922, after his work at the Imperial Hotel was completed.

On April 20, 1925, Wright returned from eating dinner in the detached dining room when he noticed smoke billowing from his bedroom. By that time of night, most of the employees had returned home; only a driver and one apprentice were left in the complex. Unlike the first Taliesin fire, Wright was able to get help immediately. However, the fire quickly spread due to high winds. Despite the efforts of Wright and his neighbors to extinguish the flame, the living quarters of the second Taliesin were quickly destroyed. However, the workrooms where Wright kept his architectural drafts were spared. According to Wright's autobiography, the fire appeared to have begun near a telephone in his bedroom. Wright also mentioned a lightning storm approaching immediately before noticing the fire. Wright scholars speculate that the storm may have caused an electrical surge through the telephone system, sparking the fire.

== Taliesin III ==
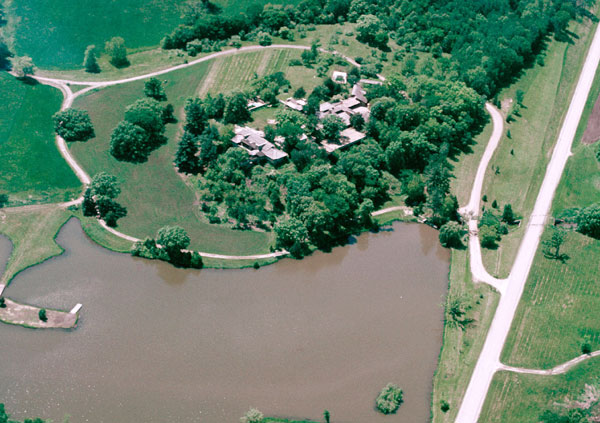
An aerial view of Taliesin

Once again, the architect began rebuilding the living quarters of Taliesin. He also wrote about this in his 1932 autobiography, naming the house "Taliesin III":

Well—counselled [sic] by the living—there was I alive in their midst, key to a Taliesin nobler than the first if I could make it. And I had faith that I could build another Taliesin!

A few days later clearing away the debris to reconstruct I picked up partly calcined marble heads of the Tang-dynasty, fragments of the black basalt of the splendid Wei-stone, Sung soft-clay sculpture and gorgeous Ming pottery turned to the color of bronze by the intensity of the blaze. The sacrificial offerings to—whatever Gods may be.

And I put these fragments aside to weave them into the masonry—the fabric of Taliesin III that now—already in mind—was to stand in place of Taliesin II. And I went to work.

Wright was deeply in debt following the destruction of Taliesin II. Aside from debts owed on the property, his divorce from Noel forced Wright to sell much of his farm machinery and livestock. Wright was also forced to sell his prized Japanese prints at half value to pay his debts. The Bank of Wisconsin foreclosed on Taliesin in 1927 and Wright was forced to move to La Jolla, California. Shortly before the bank was to begin an auction on the property, Wright's former client Darwin Martin conceived a scheme to save the property. He formed a company called Frank Lloyd Wright Incorporated to issue stock on Wright's future earnings. Many of Wright's former clients and students purchased stock in Wright to raise $70,000. The company successfully bid on Taliesin for $40,000, returning it to Wright. Wright returned to Taliesin by October 1928. Wright's interaction with Taliesin lasted for the rest of his life, and eventually, he purchased the surrounding land, creating an estate of 593 acres (2.4 km²).

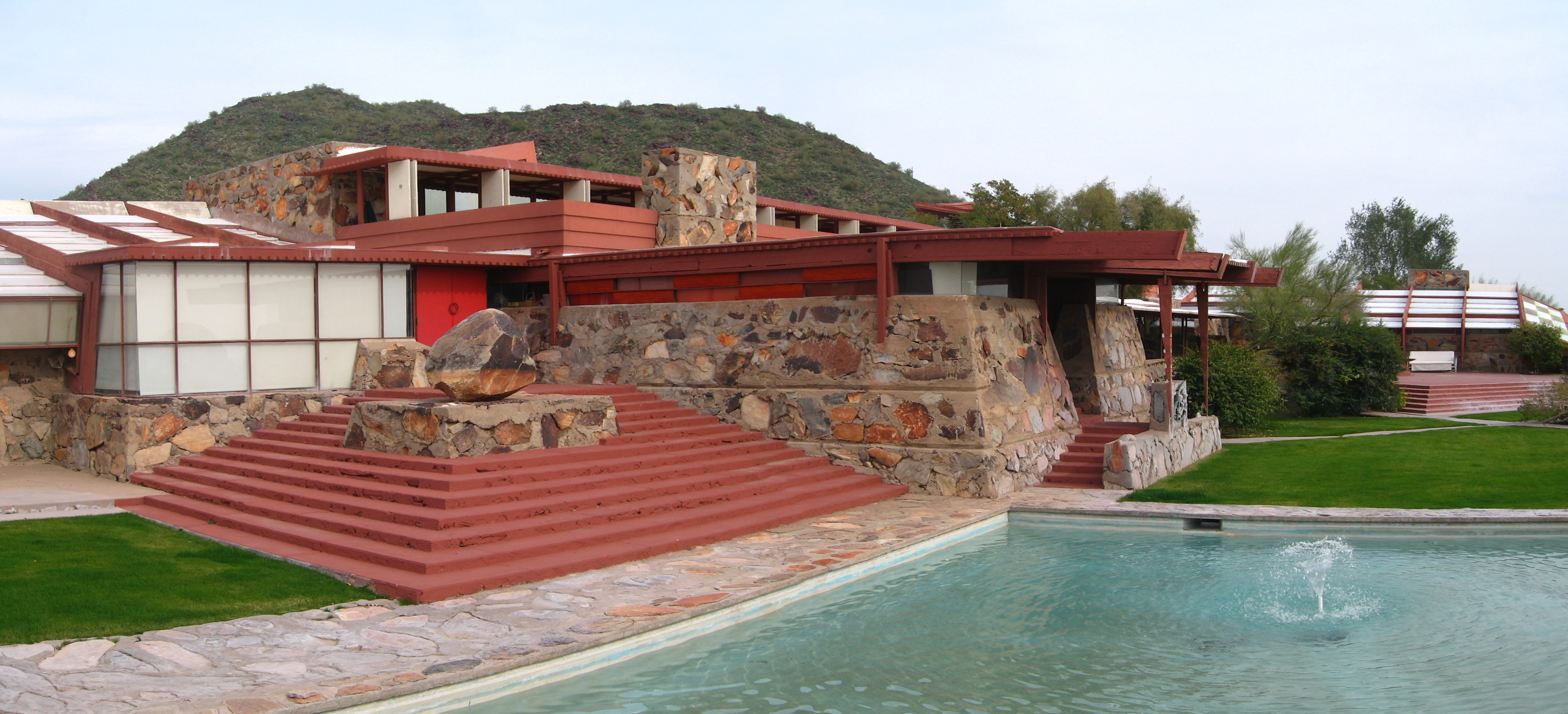
Starting in 1937, Wright wintered at Taliesin West in Arizona.

Some of Wright's best-known buildings and most ambitious designs were created at his studio in the Taliesin III period. Works completed at Taliesin through the 1930s include Fallingwater (the house for Edgar Sr. and Liliane Kaufmann), the world headquarters for S.C. Johnson, and the first Usonian house for Herbert and Katherine Jacobs. After World War II, Wright moved his studio work in Wisconsin to the drafting studio at the Hillside Home School. After that, Wright used the studio at Taliesin for meeting with prospective apprentices and clients.

=== Architecture and layout ===
The modern-day Taliesin property is at 5481 County Road C in Wyoming, Iowa County, Wisconsin. All Wright buildings on the property have a combined 75,000 square feet (7,000 m^{2}), just short of 2 acres (0.81 ha), on 600 acres (240 ha) of land. Through Wright's lifetime, he and his apprentices continued to make changes to Taliesin III. but these modifications were never reflected in blueprints. Construction was handled mostly by Wright's apprentices, who tended to be inexperienced, leaving cracks and gaps throughout the structure. Wright added several dams across the estate to create lakes. The presence of Taliesin also influenced the architecture of public buildings in the nearby town of Spring Green, which contain details influenced by Wright's designs.

==== Main home ====
In its final form, the Taliesin III building measures 37,000 square feet (3,400 m^{2}). The current structure is the northernmost building in the complex and is arranged in the shape of the letter "U", facing south-southwest. In contrast to Wright's later work—which tended to incorporate curved forms—Taliesin III largely incorporates rectangular shapes in its design. Surrounding the main house are fountains, gardens, and courtyards, in a similar manner to the first two complexes. The house is accessed from a driveway that wraps around the hill, leading to the main courtyard. Water from one of the estate's lakes is pumped upward into the courtyard, supplying the pools there; the courtyard also contains oak trees and a perimeter wall made of rock. One magazine wrote that the house "emerges from the hillside like a natural outcropping, rooted in the earth".

Wright's apprentices were responsible for much of the construction; they used recycled materials, as well as then-uncommon materials such as plywood, to construct much of the building. The facade is clad with limestone from the surrounding area. Wright mixed stucco with Wisconsin River sand to turn the walls into a yellowish color. The house is topped by intersecting hipped roofs with masonry chimneys. The house's service wing, which wraps around one side of the hill, is the only part of the house that rises above the hill.

The interior is asymmetrical, and the rooms are not as formally organized as those of Wright's later Prairie Houses; rather, the interior layout accommodated the site's topography. Some of the spaces inside the house have ceilings measuring about 6 feet (1.8 m) high, slightly taller than Wright himself, who measured 5 feet 8 inches (1.73 m) tall. Among the spaces with low ceilings is the vestibule, where Wright wanted to discourage people from loitering. The vestibule leads directly to the living room, which overlooks the Wisconsin River; the living room has large glass windows and a sloped ceiling. To the right of the living room is a "birdwalk", which is cantilevered from the house. Wright's own bedroom has a low ceiling with clerestory windows, as well as a sliding glass wall that opens onto a terrace. There is also a studio with a hipped ceiling and a stone fireplace. The other interior spaces include an office and a sitting room.

==== Other structures ====
The Hillside Home School, the southernmost building in the complex, is designed in the Prairie Style. It has a 5,000-square-foot (460 m^{2}) apprentices' drafting room. In addition, the Hillside Home School contains a theater with 100 seats. The modern Taliesin complex also includes the Midway Farm, constructed between 1938 and 1947. Though the site is no longer used as a farm, several of the Midway Farm buildings still exist, including a stone milk house, the Midway Barn, and several wooden structures. Wright's sister's house, Tan-y-Deri, is located up the hill from Midway Farm. Next to Tan-y-Deri is the octagonal Romeo and Juliet Windmill, a wooden structure measuring 60 feet (18 m) high. In addition, the Taliesin Dam is located near the complex's entrance driveway, and there are various other houses across the grounds. Nearby is the Unity Chapel, where Wright would later be buried.

=== Taliesin Fellowship ===
Wright inherited the nearby Hillside Home School when it became insolvent in 1915 (the school had been run by his aunts, and the building was designed by him). In 1928, Wright conceived the idea of hosting a school there and issued a proposal to the University of Wisconsin that would have created the Hillside Home School for the Allied Arts; however, the plan was later abandoned. In 1932, the Wrights instead established the private Taliesin Fellowship, where fifty to sixty apprentices could come to Taliesin to study under the architect's mentorship. Apprentices helped him develop the estate at a time when Wright received few commissions for his work, including the Hillside Home School building, renovating the original school gymnasium into a theater. Apprentices under Wright's direction also constructed a drafting studio and dormitories. Notable fellows include Arthur Dyson, Fay Jones, Shao Fang Sheng, Paolo Soleri, Edgar Tafel, and Paul Tuttle.

In 1937, Wright designed and the apprentices began construction on a winter home in Scottsdale, Arizona, which became known as Taliesin West. After Taliesin West was completed, Wright and the fellowship "migrated" between the two homes each year, spending winters in Arizona and summers in Wisconsin.

Wright did not consider the fellowship a formal school, instead viewing it as a benevolent educational institution. He also worked to ensure G.I. Bill eligibility for returning World War II veterans. The town of Wyoming, Wisconsin, and Wright became embroiled in a legal dispute over his claim of tax exemption. A trial judge agreed with the town, stating that, since apprentices did much of Wright's work, it was not solely a benevolent institution. Wright fought the case to the Wisconsin Supreme Court. When Wright lost the case there in 1954, he threatened to abandon the estate. However, he was persuaded to stay after some friends raised $800,000 to cover the back taxes at a benefit dinner. The Taliesin Fellowship evolved into The School of Architecture.

== Preservation ==
In 1940, Frank Lloyd Wright, his third wife Olgivanna, and his son-in-law William Wesley Peters formed the Frank Lloyd Wright Foundation. Wright added a third story above the second-story bedrooms and first-story living spaces in 1943, though this ended up weakening the original house's frame. The Hillside School building caught fire in April 1952, and the theater and dining room in that building were subsequently rebuilt. Upon Wright's death on April 9, 1959, he was buried next to the Unity Chapel in the Lloyd-Jones cemetery near Taliesin; his body remained there until 1985, when it was moved to Taliesin West. Ownership of the Taliesin estate in Spring Green, as well as Taliesin West, was conveyed to the foundation. The Taliesin Fellowship continued to use the Hillside School as The School of Architecture at Taliesin. The fellowship allowed tours of the school, but initially did not permit visitation of the house or other grounds.

When the group spent two summers in Switzerland, rumors started that they were planning on selling the house to S. C. Johnson, a former Wright client. Instead, the fellowship sold a surrounding piece of land to a developer associated with the company, intending to develop a tourist complex. The 3,000-acre (1,200 ha) resort included an eighteen-hole golf course, restaurant, and a visitor center.

=== Rehabilitation ===
==== 1970s and 1980s ====
By the late 20th century, Taliesin had become dilapidated in spite of the Frank Lloyd Wright Foundation's efforts to maintain it. With the NHL designation, the organization had received $300,000 in federal funds to help maintain the property. However, the organization needed another $2.5 million to rehabilitate the estate by the early 1980s. At the time, the organization barely had enough money for regular maintenance of Taliesin and Taliesin West, let alone long-term repairs. Furthermore, the house had been damaged during an electrical fire in 1975. Some parts of the property, such as the Romeo and Juliet Windmill, were in even worse condition than the main house.

The Frank Lloyd Wright Foundation conducted some repairs to the building in the 1980s. These included injecting concrete into the soil to prevent the house's foundation from settling, re-plastering the walls, adding a foam covering to the roof, and insulating the ceilings. Though the Frank Lloyd Wright Foundation still occupied the estate seasonally, Taliesin was closed to the public. In 1983, the Frank Lloyd Wright Foundation began selling off the contents of Wright's archives to raise money for a $20 million endowment fund to restore the estate. These sales were controversial, with opponents objecting to the dispersal of Wright's documents. During that time, all the buildings except for the Hillside Home School were typically closed to the public.

In 1987, the National Park Service evaluated the 1,811 NHLs nationwide for historical integrity and threat of damage. Taliesin was declared a "Priority 1" NHL, a site that is "seriously damaged or imminently with such damage". The main building was in poor shape, with cracking plaster, sinking foundations, and rotting wood. Some of the wooden floors had warped, and the birdwalk had developed a large crack. The other buildings at Taliesin were in similarly poor condition, having weathered over the years. There was no heating system, and many parts of the complex were exposed to moisture and extreme heat. The National Trust for Historic Preservation also listed the site as one of America's Most Endangered Places due to "water damage, erosion, foundation settlement and wood decay". Many of these structural issues were attributed to the haphazard, experimental nature of Taliesin's construction, which had been described as resembling a "stage set". Richard Carney, who led the Frank Lloyd Wright Foundation, began raising $10–20 million for repairs to both Taliesins.

==== 1990s: Initial work ====
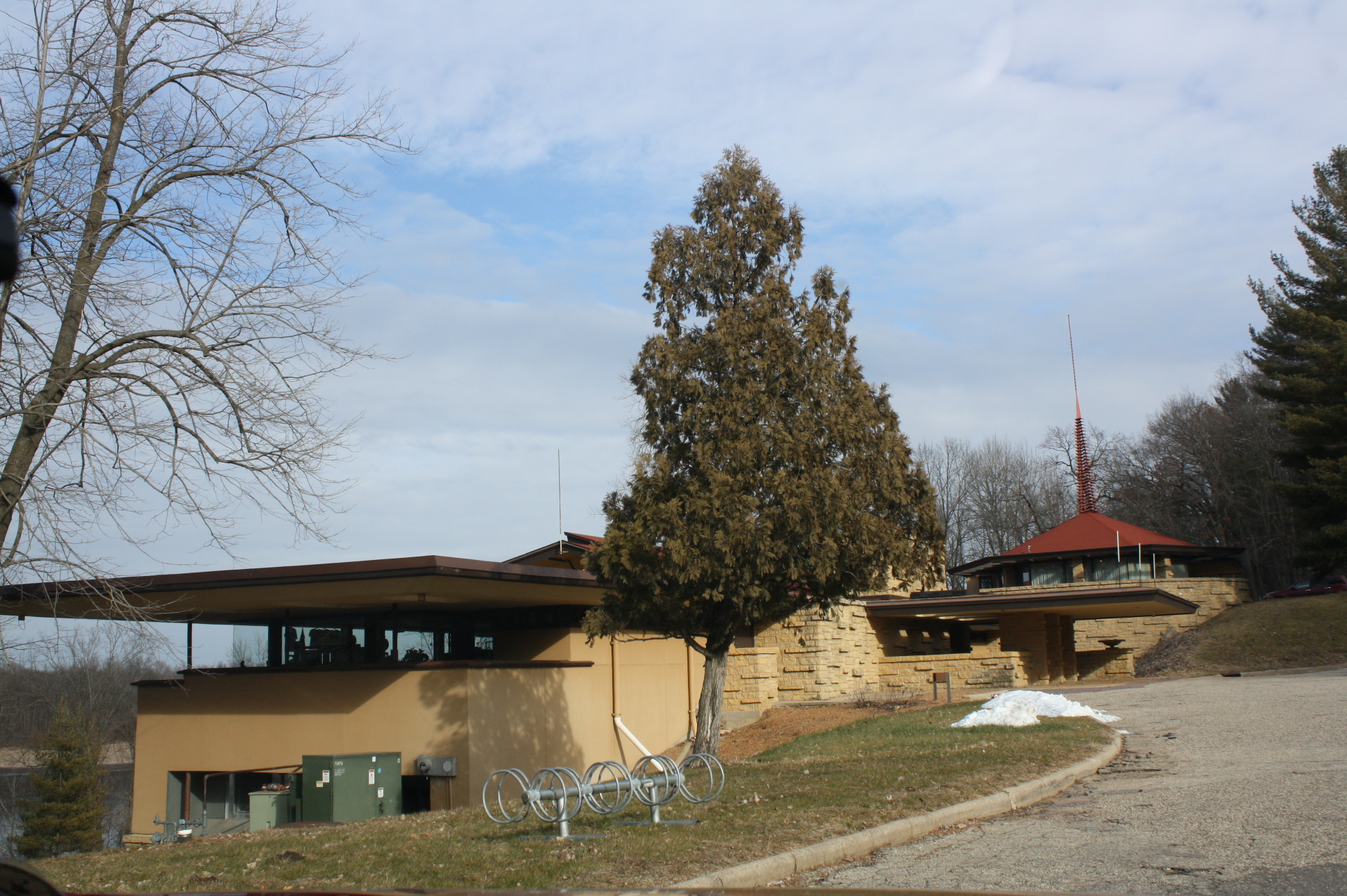
Wright's Riverview Terrace Restaurant (1953), used as a visitor center by TPI since 1993

Wisconsin governor Tommy Thompson appointed a commission in 1988 to prepare plans for preserving and operating Taliesin; the commission estimated that it would cost $14.7 million to repair the complex. Thompson established Taliesin Preservation, Inc. (TPI), a non-profit organization, in 1990 to restore Taliesin. The Frank Lloyd Wright Foundation retained ownership of the complex, working with TPI to preserve the property. TPI received $150,000 from the state government, a $50,000 matching grant from the J. Paul Getty Trust, and a $100,000 grant from the Lynde and Harry Bradley Foundation. The Taliesin complex began hosting tours in mid-1992. Thompson suggested in late 1992 that the Wisconsin Housing and Economic Development Authority (WHEDA) fund the house's restoration with an $8 million bond issue. Thompson estimated that the complex could attract up to 150,000 visitors annually, generating more than $10 million in tourist spending in Wisconsin. WHEDA approved a loan for the complex later the same year. In addition, TPI suggested spending $3.8 million on a visitor center. TPI's executive director Robert Burley drew up plans for Taliesin's restoration. By the mid-1990s, the renovation was expected to cost an estimated $24 million.

Early restoration work included repairs to the foundation, remediation of fire hazards, and emergency repairs to other parts of the house. U.S. senator Herb Kohl introduced a bill in July 1993 to provide another $8 million for Taliesin's restoration. Kohl and U.S. representative Scott Klug also cosponsored legislation to convert Taliesin into a National Park Service site, though the Frank Lloyd Wright Foundation would have continued to own the complex. TPI also sought to raise the final $8 million for the restoration from donations. The first part of Taliesin to be restored, the terrace outside Wright's bedroom and study, was finished that October. Workers also shored up parts of the complex that were in danger of collapsing. The same year, due to the deterioration of the Taliesin Dam, Wisconsin officials asked the Frank Lloyd Wright Foundation to either repair or abandon it. TPI also bought the Wright–designed Riverview Terrace Restaurant nearby and converted it into a visitor center. The commission held an architectural design competition for the visitor center, and it selected Tony Puttnam to redesign the structure, which opened in June 1994. By then, TPI had raised $1 million from donations. Work continued on Taliesin's restoration during the 1990s, even while it was open to visitors.

Following a severe storm on June 18, 1998, a large oak tree in the courtyard fell down on top of the studio. The tree had been the last survivor of three that Wright had planted there in 1911, and its collapse caused $1 million in damage. Ten days afterward, heavy rains caused a mudslide near the main building, exposing a structural support underneath a balcony. Following these incidents, workers made emergency repairs to the house and repaired damaged interiors and windows. By the late 1990s, the complex had about 50,000 visitors per year, far fewer than the 200,000 annual visitors TPI had anticipated. Additionally, TPI earned only about $1 million a year from tourism, which was not enough to repay the WHEDA loan, and TPI missed a $6.5 million payment on the loan in January 1999. The Wisconsin government ended up forgiving most of the loan. That May, the federal government agreed to give Taliesin a $1.15 million matching grant from Save America's Treasures on the condition that TPI raise an equal amount. This funding would be used for interior restoration and drainage repairs. The same year, TPI began soliciting donations to restore the grounds as part of the Trees for Taliesin program, and publishing executive Frank Anton announced plans to raise $25 million for the renovation through the Taliesin Restoration Project. At the time, there were plans to repair the studio wing and Tan-y-Deri. Another storm in late 1999 collapsed a tunnel underneath the studio wing.

==== 21st century ====
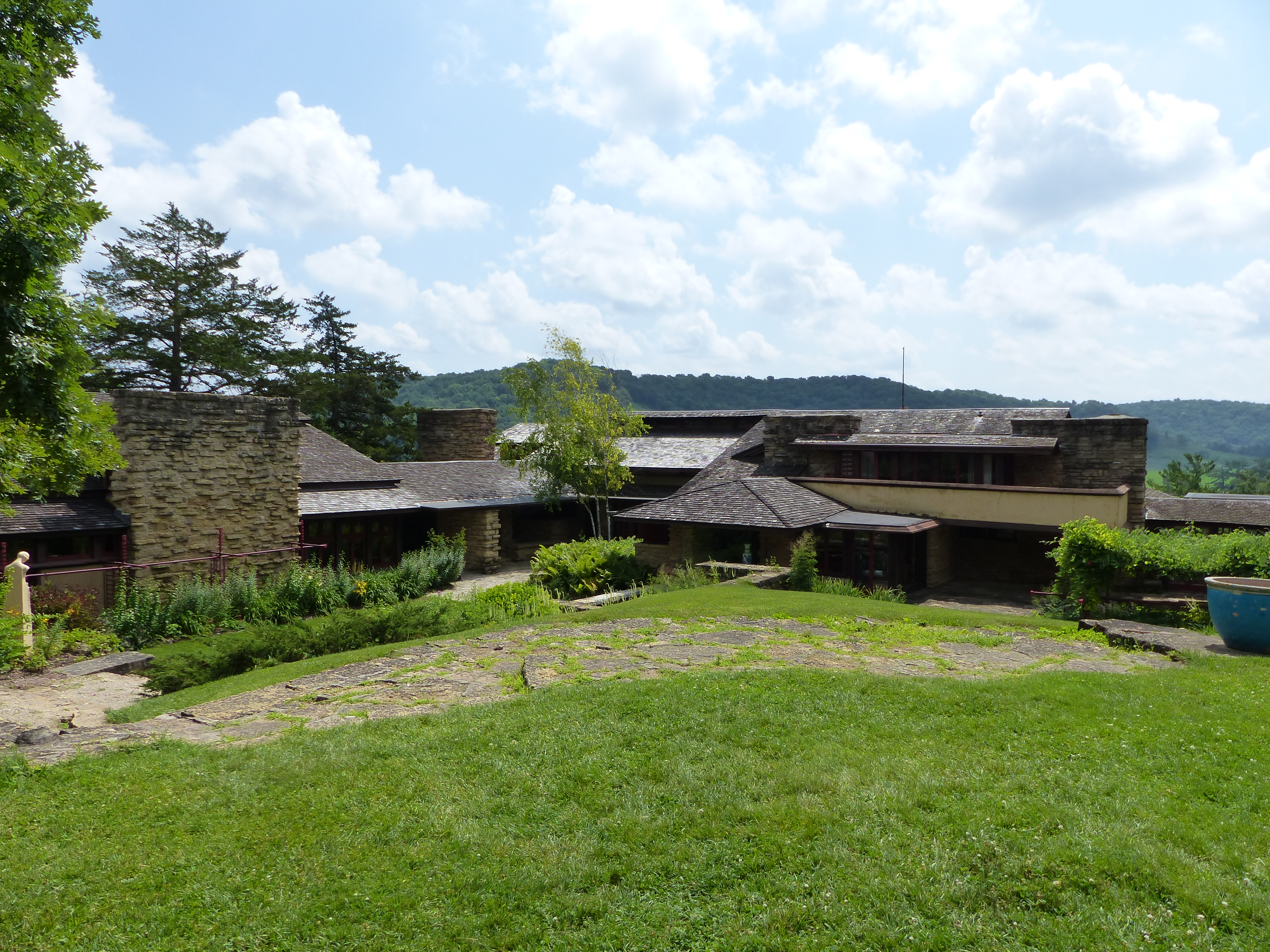
Exterior of the main house as seen from further up the hill

According to the Wisconsin State Journal, Taliesin's preservation was "fraught with epic difficulties", because Wright never thought of it as a series of buildings with a long-term future. The studio wing's restoration was completed in August 2000 at a cost of $400,000, three-fourths of which was covered from insurance payouts; private donors paid the rest of the cost. By 2002, the Frank Lloyd Wright Foundation estimated that it might cost up to $60 million to refurbish the Taliesin complex. At the time, workers were about to stabilize the hill under the house, as the hillside was causing Taliesin's walls to slant and its walkways to crack. To prevent further water damage, tarpaulins had been placed on the ground as an emergency measure. TPI had issues raising money due to a weakening of the local economy, and many of the complex's structural issues were not readily visible to the public, posing further fundraising difficulties. Preservationists predicted that the estate would be irreversibly damaged if it were not repaired within five to ten years.

A $900,000 project to improve Taliesin's drainage system was completed in 2004. The cost of the restoration had increased to $67 million by 2005, of which the main house alone was estimated to cost $26 million. The same year, businessman T. Denny Sanford donated $425,000 for Taliesin's restoration. These funds, which were matched by part of the Save America's Treasures grant, were used to pay for further repairs to the roof, as well as planning for future repairs. There were also plans to replace a bridge carrying Taliesin's driveway across a creek. In 2006, the Jeffris Family Foundation agreed to fund 25% of Tan-y-Deri's restoration, which at the time was estimated to cost $828,000. Over $11 million was spent on the rehabilitation of Taliesin between 1988 and 2008. Financing renovations was still challenging because of lower-than expected attendance. The Wisconsin State Journal reported in 2009 that, despite increased attendance over the preceding two years, TPI still needed to raise $50 million to restore the rest of the complex. TPI also began reinforcing the house's structure, which had been undermined by the weight of the third-story guestrooms. The World Monuments Fund (WMF) added Taliesin to its 2010 World Monuments Watch to bring attention to the complex's remaining structural issues.

By the early 2010s, workers had begun repairing the house's foundation and lower level. The house was still open to the public, albeit only for guided tours; there were eight separate kinds of tours because of Taliesin's wide-ranging history and scope. To celebrate Taliesin's centennial, TPI hosted a series of events in 2011. The complex remained in danger of deterioration, prompting the WMF to add Taliesin to its 2014 World Monuments Watch. In the mid-2010s, preservationists also began restoring Taliesin's gardens to their 1959 appearance. This project included adding hollyhocks and rearranging orchards to Wright's original specifications. Additionally, to attract visitors to Taliesin and other Wright–designed sites in Wisconsin, state legislators proposed giving money to the Wisconsin Department of Tourism for the installation of road signs promoting these sites. Taliesin was subsequently included on the Frank Lloyd Wright Trail, which was established in 2017.

In 2018, Taliesin received a $320,000 grant for the Hillside theater's restoration through the Save America's Treasures program; the project included improving drainage, upgrading mechanical systems, and adding rooms to the basement. This project was initially planned to cost $867,000 and take two years. The theater did not reopen until 2024, and its renovation ultimately cost $1.1 million. Workers also restored Taliesin's Midway Barn in the 2020s. The Wisconsin government's 2025–2027 budget, signed by Governor Tony Evers in July 2025, allocated $5 million to Taliesin's preservation.

=== Visitation ===
TPI provides tours from May 1 through October 31 of each year, though weekend tours of the grounds are also available in April and November. Other events and programs are available sporadically through the rest of the year. Tours of the house's interior are usually not given from November to April because Taliesin has no heating system; Wright had removed Taliesin's furnaces after his Taliesin West complex was completed. In addition, visitors are not ordinarily allowed to stay at the complex overnight. Taliesin was temporarily closed to the public for several months in 2020 due to the COVID-19 pandemic. As of 2023, more than 25,000 people visit Taliesin each year. The Wisconsin Historical Society's collections include rare old photographs of Taliesin.

== Impact and legacy ==
=== Reception ===
Architectural historian James F. O'Gorman compares Taliesin to Thomas Jefferson's Monticello, calling it "not a mere building but an entire environment in which man, architecture and nature form a harmonious whole". He continues that the building is an expression of Romanticism influence in architecture. William Barillas, in an essay of the Prairie School movement, agrees with O'Gorman's assessment and calls Taliesin "the ultimate prairie house". The Wall Street Journal wrote in 1985 that, even though the Taliesin complex was not Wright's most elaborate or expensive design, they are still compelling statements about shelter and about nature".

Robert Cross wrote for the Chicago Tribune in 2001 that "Everywhere—parlor, bedrooms, garden terraces—the eye falls on beauty. The outside comes in through the windows with gorgeous effect". In a 2009 publication for the Thoreau Society, Naomi Uechi notes thematic similarities between the architecture of Taliesin and the concept of simplicity advocated by philosopher Henry David Thoreau. Architectural historian Neil Levine highlighted the abstract nature of the complex, comparing it to the works of Pablo Picasso. In "House Proud", an article in Boston Globe Magazine by the Pulitzer Prize–winning architecture critic Robert Campbell, Taliesin was described as "my candidate for the title of the greatest single building in America". Another writer, in The New York Times, said of Taliesin that "the key idea is horizontality", contrasting with the vertical design elements of skyscrapers that were being built at the same time.

Several sources have described Taliesin as an embodiment of Wright and his architectural philosophy. In Taliesin 1911–1914, a collection of essays about the first house, the authors and editor conclude that Taliesin was "Wright's architectural self-portrait". Paul Goldberger, the architectural critic for The New York Times, similarly wrote in 1994 that "there is no better way into the soul of Frank Lloyd Wright than to tour this house". The Milwaukee Journal Sentinel wrote the next year that the complex's design provided insight into "the career of a man who reinvented the language of architecture". TPI's president Carol McChesney Johnson said in 2011 that Taliesin "was a part of who he was", in contrast to other buildings that he designed but did not occupy. The following year, a writer for the Wisconsin Magazine of History described Taliesin as "a quintessential example of how architectural history and biography can blend into a single entity". A writer for Madison magazine wrote in 2024 that "trees growing into and out of the structure, moss-covered stones and ramshackle facades" at Taliesin were in keeping with Wright's experimental nature and love of organic architecture, but that the estate was hard to maintain as a result.

=== Landmark designations ===
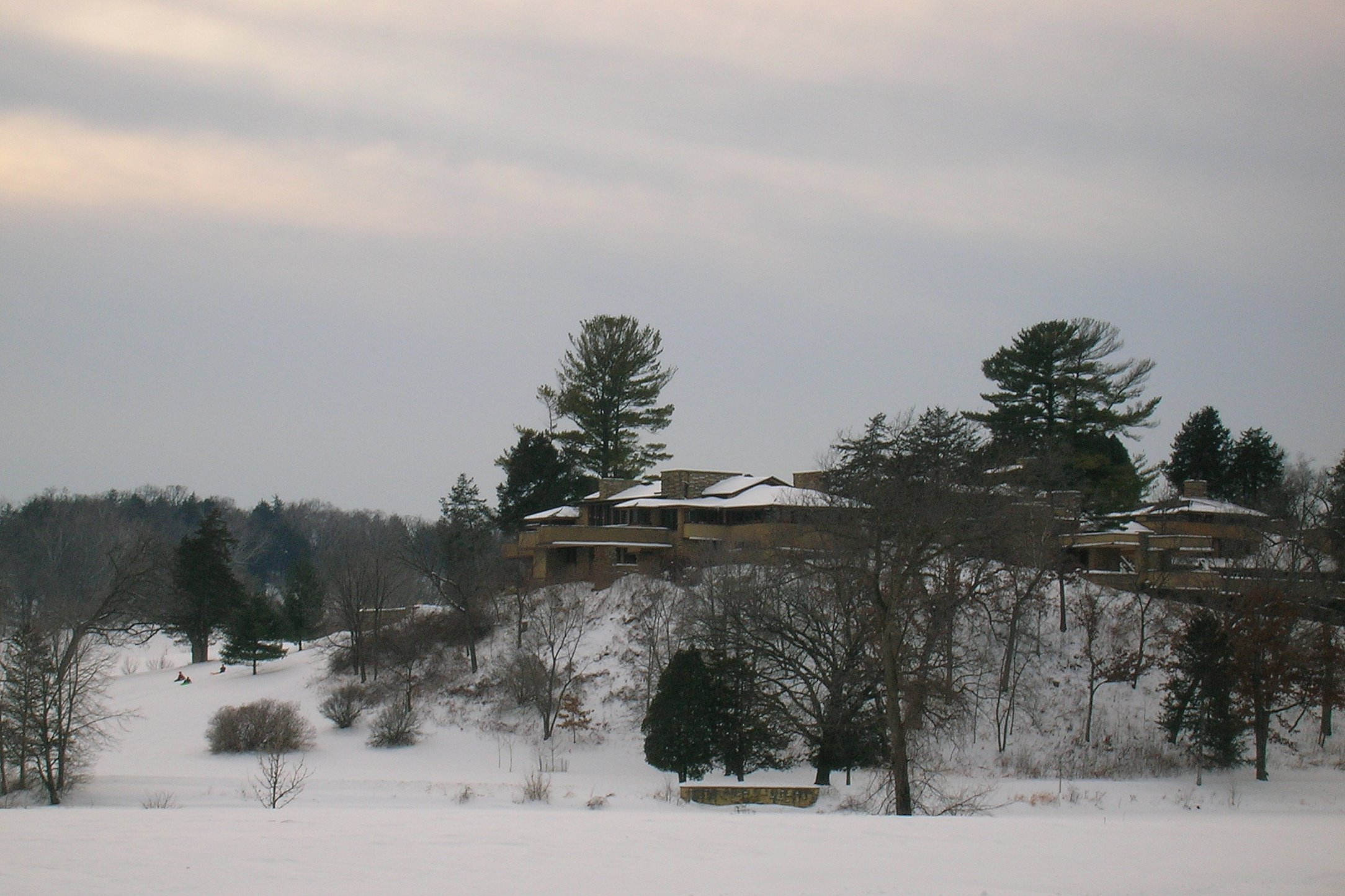
Taliesin in winter

In 1973, the Taliesin estate was listed in the National Register of Historic Places and in 1976, it was recognized as a National Historic Landmark (NHL) District by the National Park Service. A National Historic Landmark is a site deemed to have "exceptional value to the nation". The properties contributing to the district are the landscape, Taliesin III, the pool and gardens in the courtyard, Hillside Home School (which includes the Hillside drafting studio and the theater), the dam, Romeo and Juliet Windmill, Midway Barn, and Tan-y-Deri.

In the late 1980s, Taliesin and Taliesin West were jointly nominated as a World Heritage Site, a UNESCO designation for properties with special worldwide significance. The federal government endorsed the nomination, but UNESCO rejected it because the organization wanted to see a larger nomination with more Wright properties. In 2008, the National Park Service submitted the Taliesin estate along with nine other Frank Lloyd Wright properties to a tentative list for World Heritage Status, which the National Park Service says is "a necessary first step in the process of nominating a site to the World Heritage List". The United States Department of the Interior again nominated the Taliesin estate to UNESCO's World Heritage List in 2015, alongside nine other buildings. UNESCO ultimately added eight properties, including Taliesin, to the World Heritage List in July 2019 under the title "The 20th-Century Architecture of Frank Lloyd Wright". Wisconsin Public Radio wrote that the World Heritage designation was "a triumph for Wisconsin", as two of the eight properties were located in the state. Taliesin is the only publicly-accessible UNESCO site in Wisconsin; the other such site—the Herbert and Katherine Jacobs First House, another Wright property added to the World Heritage List in 2019—is privately owned.

== See also ==
- List of Frank Lloyd Wright works
- List of National Historic Landmarks in Wisconsin
- National Register of Historic Places listings in Iowa County, Wisconsin
- Taliesin West
