= Riverview Terrace Restaurant =

Restaurant in Iowa County, Wisconsin

The Frank Lloyd Wright Visitor Center
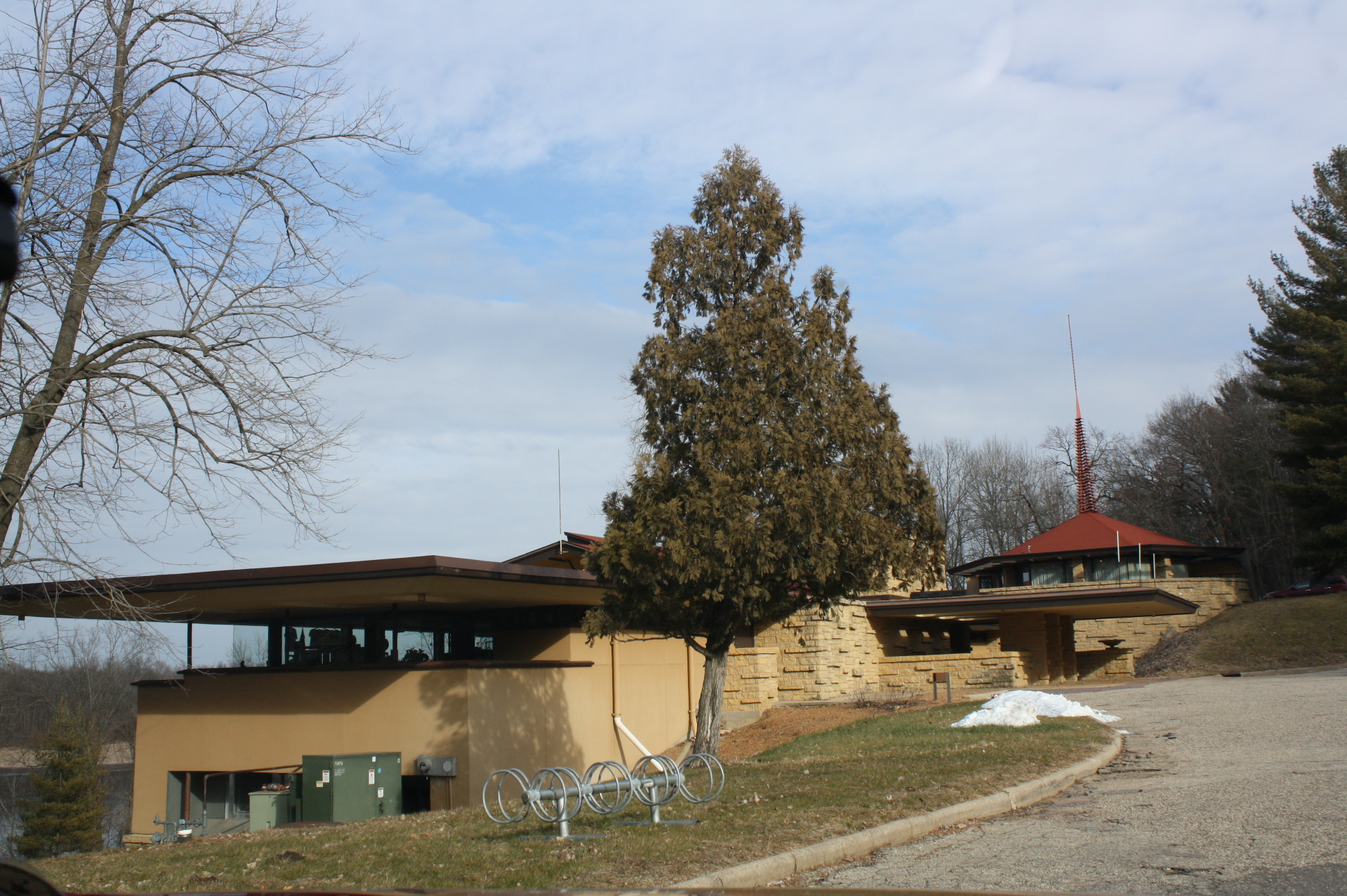

- Location within Wisconsin Location within the United States
- Former names: The Spring Green Restaurant, the Riverview Terrace Restaurant

General information
- Type: Restaurant
- Architectural style: Usonian
- Location: south of Spring Green, in Iowa County, Wisconsin
- Coordinates: 43°08′38″N 90°03′34″W
- Construction started: 1953
- Completed: 1967, 1969

Design and construction
- Architect: Frank Lloyd Wright

The Riverview Terrace Restaurant, also known as The Spring Green Restaurant, is a building designed by architect Frank Lloyd Wright in 1953 near his Taliesin estate in Wisconsin. He purchased the land on which to build the restaurant as, "a wayside for tourists with a balcony over the river." Construction began the next year, with the roof being added by 1957. The building was incomplete when he died in 1959, but was purchased in 1966 by the Wisconsin River Development Corporation and completed the next year as The Spring Green restaurant. The building was listed on the National Register of Historic Places in 2024.

== History ==
In 1968, Food Service Magazine had an article about the newly opened restaurant:

... [W]hen a restaurant is designed by such a giant in his profession as the late architect Frank Lloyd Wright, it's important to find out what makes it a thing of beauty—to analyze in detail the elements of its design and appointments in search of principles that can be applied to food service facilities elsewhere.

No one in the past century has influenced architecture as an art and science more profoundly than Frank Lloyd Wright. Basic to his philosophy of "organic" architecture was the tenet that a building and its environment should be as one—that the structure, through proper blending of native materials and creation of appropriate linear features, should be in perfect harmony with its surroundings.

"Organic architecture comes out of nature," Wright said in a Food Service Magazine interview shortly before he died. He believed that each detail of the architecture and interior should be related to the building's overall concept. Each design element should reflect the whole environment, as opposed to having each design component reflect a separate idea all its own. ...

The Spring Green is a very subtle structure. It does not impose brash neon signs or harsh vertical lines upon an essentially horizontal rolling countryside. The structure is built, for the most part, only of those materials that come from the vital riverscape which is the site of the restaurant.

Wright's disciple, William Wesley Peters ... observes, "The building and its forms arise from the use of natural materials to their specific properties. For example, the rich, buff-colored limestone was quarried only a few miles away. It was laid in great horizontal courses with long, thin, projecting ledges that symbolically represent the character and quality of the stone at the quarry."

Bruce Brooks Pfeiffer (first director of the Frank Lloyd Wright Foundation Archives and director emeritus until his death in 2017) wrote that, "In 1993 the building converted to use as the Visitor Center for the Taliesin Buildings." As stated by Pfeiffer, the building has functioned as the Frank Lloyd Wright Visitor Center since 1994. It is owned and operated under the direction of Taliesin Preservation, the non-profit organization in Wisconsin that restores and preserves the Frank Lloyd Wright-designed buildings on the Taliesin estate. As a visitor center, the building is the starting point for tours of the Taliesin estate and houses a giftshop, restaurant (known as "The Riverview Terrace Cafe") and offices for Taliesin Preservation. The building is open during tourist season.

== See also ==
- List of Frank Lloyd Wright works
