= Shao Fang Sheng =

Chinese artist (1918–2009)

Shao Fang Sheng

Shao Fang Sheng (September 13, 1918 – April 22, 2009) was a Chinese artist who was also an apprentice of Frank Lloyd Wright.

== Early life ==
Shao came from a well-known industrial family that had their roots in Changzhou, Jiangsu province, China. She was born and raised during the overthrow of the Qing dynasty and the founding of the Republic of China. At age 17, she became a disciple of classical Chinese painter Chen Shaomei.

She was very athletic in her youth, representing her city Tianjin, as a short stop nationally in softball as a teenager.

== Career ==
Upon arrival to the United States, she stayed with Frank Lloyd Wright and Olgivanna Lloyd Wright, where she apprenticed and cooked and entertained guests including John Wayne, James Stewart and other actors and socialites. She taught Mandarin to John King Fairbank, a well-known scholar from Harvard University, in the American Embassy, Nanjing. Furthermore, her ability to paint with watercolours was noticed by several well-known painting masters, and she was commissioned by the Nationalist Government of China, to duplicate the frescos within the Mogao Caves, situated in the Gobi Desert, near Dunhuang, China. Her late husband Sheng Pao Sheng was also an apprentice of Frank Lloyd Wright and an architect and civil engineer who was a section chief of the Burma Road.

== In Recent News ==
Gen Z Couple purchase the Shengs abandoned home in Wood County, West Virginia. "The Shengs were brilliant, so we'll preserve as much as possible and let the original details sing while creating a home that's true to ourselves as well." A video posted on Vimeo filmed in 2000 shows the house as a live work studio.
