= Matthews Hall (Tempe, Arizona) =

- U.S. National Register of Historic Places
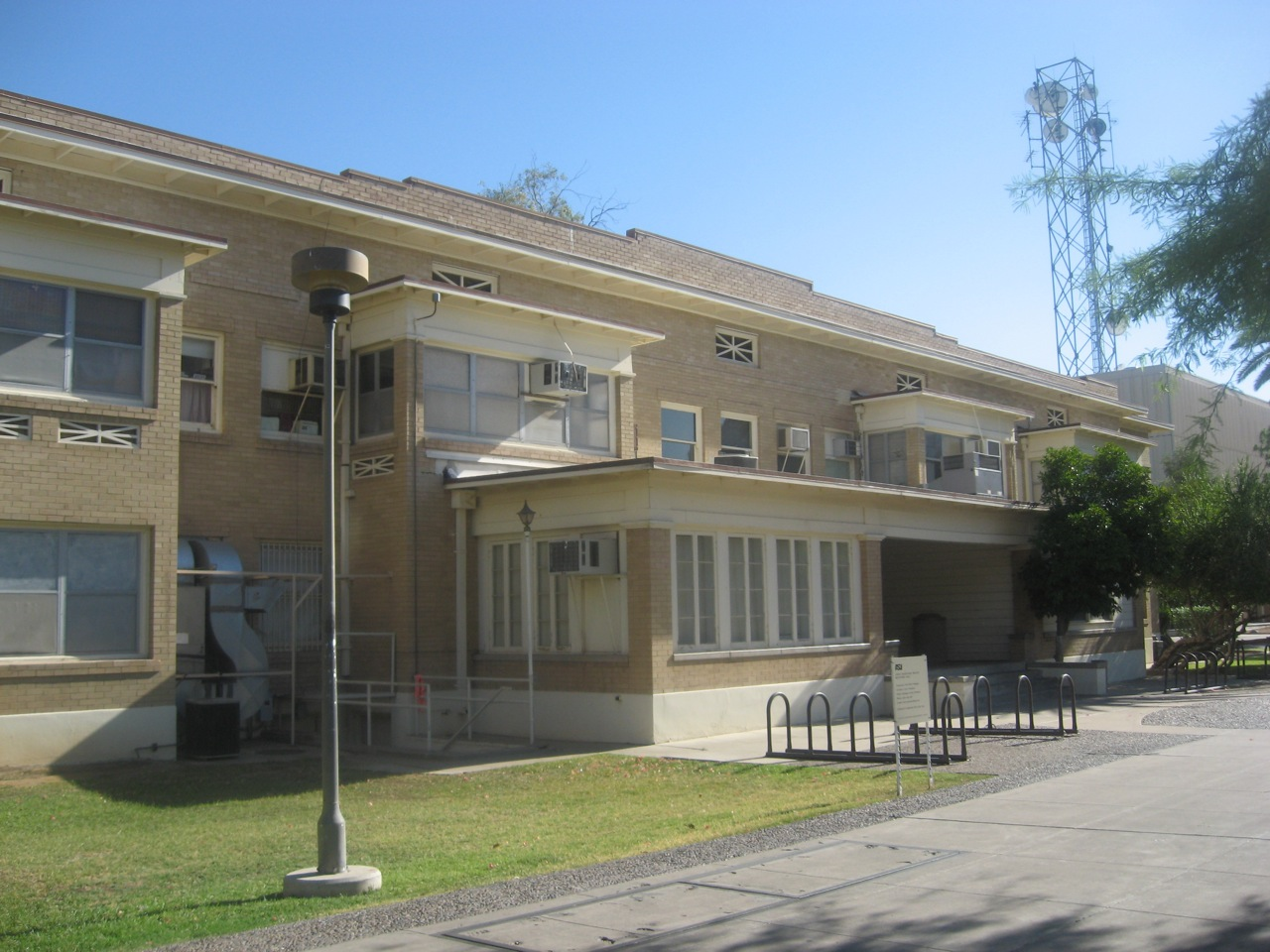
- The north elevation of Matthews Hall

- Location within Arizona Location within the United States
- Location: 925 S. Forest Mall, Tempe, Arizona
- Coordinates: 33°25′12″N 111°56′7″W
- Area: less than one acre
- Built: 1918
- Architect: L.G. Knipe
- Architectural style: Prairie School
- MPS: Tempe MRA
- NRHP reference No.: 85000053
- Added to NRHP: January 11, 1985

Matthews Hall is a building on the Tempe campus of Arizona State University. Built in 1918, it was added to the National Register of Historic Places in 1985.

== History ==
Matthews Hall is the oldest intact dormitory on the ASU campus. It was designed by L.G. Knipe and dedicated in 1920 as a men's dormitory. It was named for the president of the Tempe Normal School, Dr. Arthur John Matthews.

By 1930, it was a women's dormitory, and when the new library on campus was named the Matthews Library in honor of Dr. Matthews's 30 years as president, the dormitory was renamed Carrie Matthews Hall for the president's wife. (The library became known as Matthews Center upon its conversion in the 1960s.)

The building currently houses a photography gallery and offices for the Herberger Institute for Design and the Arts. It is also home to the ASU Forensics (Speech & Debate) team.

== Architecture ==
Matthews Hall is a symmetrical, elongated two-story building with telescoping side wings and sleeping porch bays. The building has a concrete foundation with buff brick facing; the interiors feature wood detailing.

The building has extensive Prairie School architectural styling, seen in the building's massing and details, such as broad wooden cornices, Union Jack vent covers, and grouped double-hung windows. The original stairway and living room fireplace remain in the interior.

The building also demonstrates an attempt to acclimate the building to the Arizona climate. Sleeping spaces project out from the main building to capture nighttime breezes.

Some modifications have been made; the sleeping porches have been converted to offices, while modern exit stairs have been added and windows were filled in.
