= Wyoming, Iowa County, Wisconsin =

Town of Wyoming
- Town
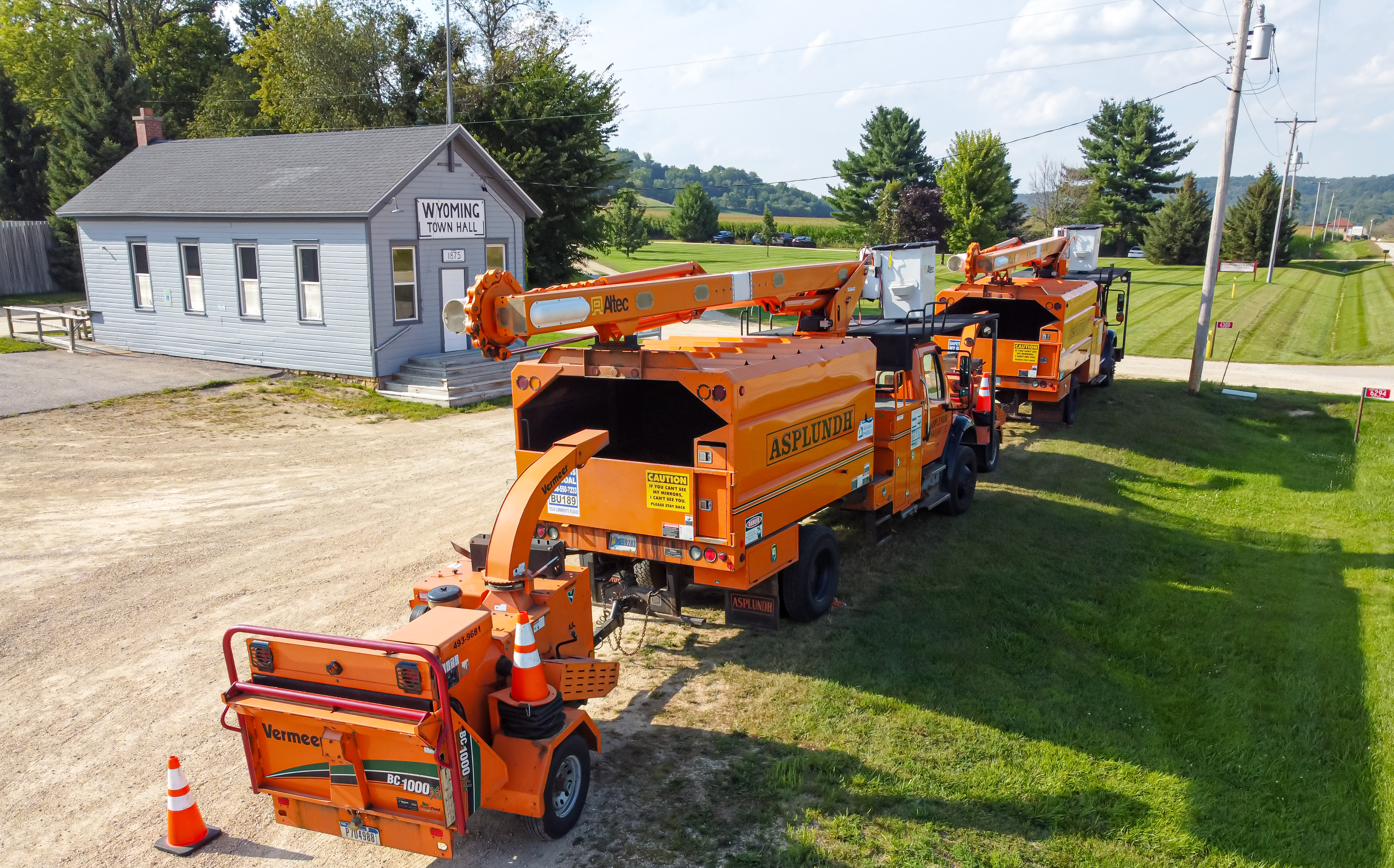
- The town hall was once a one-room school originally built in 1875.

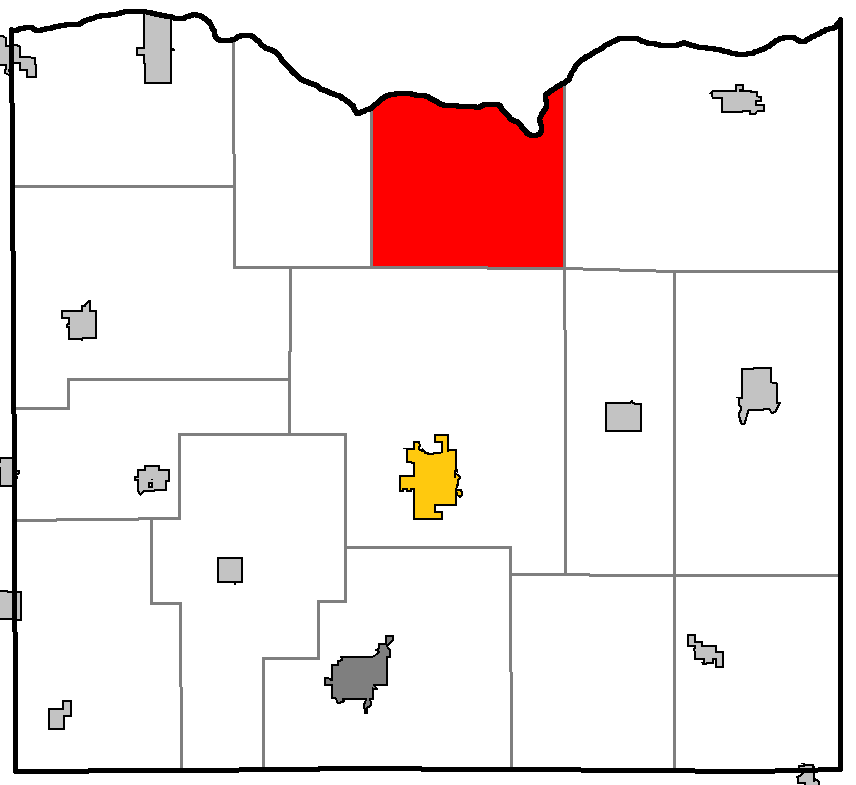
- Location of the Town of Wyoming, within Iowa County, Wisconsin

- Location of Iowa County, Wisconsin
- Coordinates: 43°07′34″N 90°06′42″W
- Country: United States
- State: Wisconsin
- County: Iowa

Area
  - Total: 40.8 sq mi (105.8 km^{2})
  - Land: 39.8 sq mi (103.0 km^{2})
  - Water: 1.1 sq mi (2.8 km^{2})
- Elevation: 741 ft (226 m)

Population (2020)
  - Total: 317
  - Density: 9.1/sq mi (3.5/km^{2})
- Time zone: UTC-6 (Central (CST))
  - Summer (DST): UTC-5 (CDT)
- ZIP Code: 53588
- Area code: 608
- FIPS code: 55-89350
- GNIS feature ID: 1584490
- Website: https://www.townofwyomingwi.gov/

The Town of Wyoming is a town located in Iowa County, Wisconsin, United States. The population was 317 at the 2020 census.

== Landmarks ==
Frank Lloyd Wright's historic estate Taliesin is located in the town, as is his Wyoming Valley School. The historic Unity Chapel, designed by Joseph Lyman Silsbee and worked on by Wright, is also located in Wyoming.

== Geography ==
According to the US Census Bureau, the town has a total area of 40.8 square miles (105.8 km^{2}), of which 39.8 square miles (103.0 km^{2}) is land and 1.1 square miles (2.8 km^{2}/2.64%) is water.

== Demographics ==
Historical population
Census	Pop.	Note	%±
2020	317		—

As of the 2000 census, there were 364 people, 145 households, and 107 families residing in the town. The population density was 9.2 people per square mile (3.5/km^{2}). There were 212 housing units at an average density of 5.3 per square mile (2.1/km^{2}). The racial makeup of the town was 99.18% White, 0.27% Native American, 0.27% from other races, and 0.27% from two or more races. Hispanic or Latino of any race were 0.27% of the population.

Of the 145 households, 29.0% included children under the age of 18, 66.9% had married couples living together, 4.1% had a female householder with no husband present, and 26.2% were non-families. 19.3% of all households consisted of individuals, and 4.1% had someone living alone who was 65 years of age or older. The average household size was 2.47 and the average family size was 2.81.

The population of the town was widely distributed, with 24.2% under the age of 18, 3.3% from 18 to 24, 31.6% from 25 to 44, 28.8% from 45 to 64, and 12.1% who were 65 years of age or older. The median age was 42 years. For every 100 females, there were 106.8 males. For every 100 females age 18 and over, there were 112.3 males.

The median income for a household was $48,438; and the median income for a family was $56,607. Males had a median income of $33,393 versus $40,673 for females. The per capita income for the town was $23,253. About 6.9% of families and 9.7% of the population were below the poverty line, including 18.8% of those under age 18 and 20.8% of those age 65 or over.

== Notable people ==
- Robert Joiner, farmer and politician
- Owen King, businessman and politician
- Albert Richardson, farmer and politician
- Harold D. Richardson, educator

== See also ==
- List of towns in Wisconsin
