= Arizona State University =

Public university in Tempe, Arizona, US

- Former names: Territorial Normal School (1885–1889); Tempe Normal School of Arizona (1889–1903); Tempe Normal School (1903–1925); Tempe State Teachers College (1925–1929); Arizona State Teachers College (1929–1945); Arizona State College (1945–1958)
- Motto: On seal: Ditat Deus (Latin)
- Motto in English: "God enriches"
- Type: Public research university
- Established: March 12, 1885; 141 years ago
- Parent institution: Arizona Board of Regents
- Accreditation: HLC
- Academic affiliations: AAU; CUMU; ORAU; URA; space-grant
- Endowment: $2.00 billion (FY2026)
- Budget: $5.75 billion (FY2026)
- President: Michael M. Crow
- Provost: Nancy Gonzales
- Academic staff: 5,679 (fall 2024)
- Total staff: 20,859 (fall 2024)
- Students: 160,051 (fall 2025)
- Undergraduates: 124,753 (fall 2025)
- Postgraduates: 35,298 (fall 2025)
- Location: Tempe, Arizona, United States; 33.4209°N 111.9340°W
- Campus: Tempe: 660 acres (2.7 km^{2}); West Valley: 277.92 acres (1.1247 km^{2}); Polytechnic: 600 acres (2.4 km^{2}); Downtown Phoenix: 27 acres (0.11 km^{2}); Midsize city (Note: In the Integrated Postsecondary Education Data System, all Arizona State University students are listed as under Campus Immersion (in Tempe) or under Digital Immersion (in Scottsdale, home to SkySong). The other ASU campuses are all in large cities (Phoenix, Mesa).)
- Other campuses and centers: Chula Vista; Glendale; Kailua-Kona; Long Beach; Los Angeles; Mesa; Phoenix; Yuma; Scottsdale; Tucson; Washington; St. George, Bermuda; London; Online
- Newspaper: The State Press
- Colors: Maroon and gold
- Nickname: Sun Devils
- Sporting affiliations: NCAA Division I FBS – Big 12; NCHC; MPSF
- Mascot: Sparky the Sun Devil
- Website: asu.edu

Arizona State University (Arizona State or ASU) is a public research university in Tempe, Arizona, United States. Founded in 1885 as Territorial Normal School by the 13th Arizona Territorial Legislature, the university is one of the largest public universities by enrollment in the United States. It was one of about 180 "normal schools" founded in the late 19th century to train teachers for the rapidly growing public common schools. Some closed, but most steadily expanded their role and became state colleges in the early 20th century, then state universities in the late 20th century.

One of three universities governed by the Arizona Board of Regents, Arizona State University is a member of the Association of American Universities (AAU) and is classified among "R1: Doctoral Universities – Very High Research Activity". As of fall 2025, ASU has 160,051 students enrolled, with 81,541 students attending online, across its four campuses and four regional learning centers throughout Arizona. ASU offers more than 400 undergraduate degree programs from its 16 colleges and over 170 cross-discipline centers and institutes for students. It also offers more than 450 graduate degree and certificate programs.

The Arizona State Sun Devils compete in 26 varsity-level sports in NCAA Division I as a member of the Big 12 Conference. Sun Devil teams have won 165 national championships, including 24 NCAA trophies. 179 Sun Devils have made Olympic teams, winning 60 Olympic medals: 25 gold, 12 silver and 23 bronze.

As of fall 2024, ASU had 5,679 faculty members. This included 6 Nobel laureates, 11 MacArthur Fellows, 10 Pulitzer Prize winners, 11 National Academy of Engineering members, 26 National Academy of Sciences members, 28 American Academy of Arts and Sciences members, 163 National Endowment for the Humanities fellows, and 289 Fulbright Program American Scholars.

== History ==
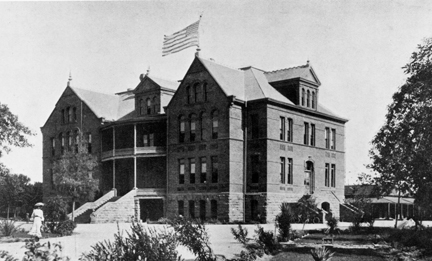
Old Main on the Arizona Territorial Normal School (future Arizona State University) campus, c. 1890

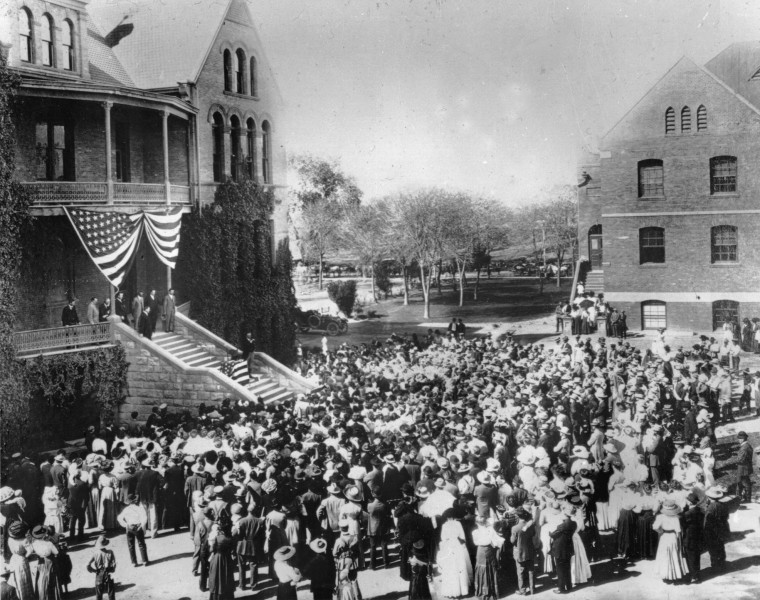
President Theodore Roosevelt addresses a crowd of students on the steps of the Old Main at Tempe Normal School (future Arizona State University), March 20, 1911.

=== 1885–1929 ===
Arizona State University was established as the Territorial Normal School at Tempe on March 12, 1885, when the 13th Arizona Territorial Legislature passed an act to create a normal school to train teachers for the Arizona Territory. The campus consisted of a single, four-room schoolhouse on a 20-acre plot largely donated by Tempe residents George and Martha Wilson. Classes started with 33 students on February 8, 1886. The curriculum evolved over the years and the name was changed several times; the institution was also known as Tempe Normal School of Arizona (1889–1903), Tempe Normal School (1903–1925), Tempe State Teachers College (1925–1929), Arizona State Teachers College (1929–1945), Arizona State College (1945–1958) and, by a 2–1 margin of the state's voters, Arizona State University in 1958.

In 1923, the school stopped offering high school courses and added a high school diploma to the admissions requirements. In 1925, the school became the Tempe State Teachers College and offered four-year Bachelor of Education degrees as well as two-year teaching certificates. In 1929, the 9th Arizona State Legislature authorized Bachelor of Arts in Education degrees as well, and the school was renamed the Arizona State Teachers College. Under the 30-year tenure of president Arthur John Matthews (1900–1930), the school was given all-college student status. The first dormitories built in the state were constructed under his supervision in 1902. Of the 18 buildings constructed while Matthews was president, six are still in use. Matthews envisioned an "evergreen campus", with many shrubs brought to the campus, and implemented the planting of 110 Mexican Fan Palms on what is now known as Palm Walk, a century-old landmark of the Tempe campus.

During the Great Depression, Ralph Waldo Swetman was hired to succeed President Matthews, coming to Arizona State Teachers College in 1930 from Humboldt State Teachers College where he had served as president. He served a three-year term, during which he focused on improving teacher-training programs. During his tenure, enrollment at the college doubled, topping the 1,000 mark for the first time. Matthews also conceived of a self-supported summer session at the school at Arizona State Teachers College, a first for the school.

=== 1930–1989 ===
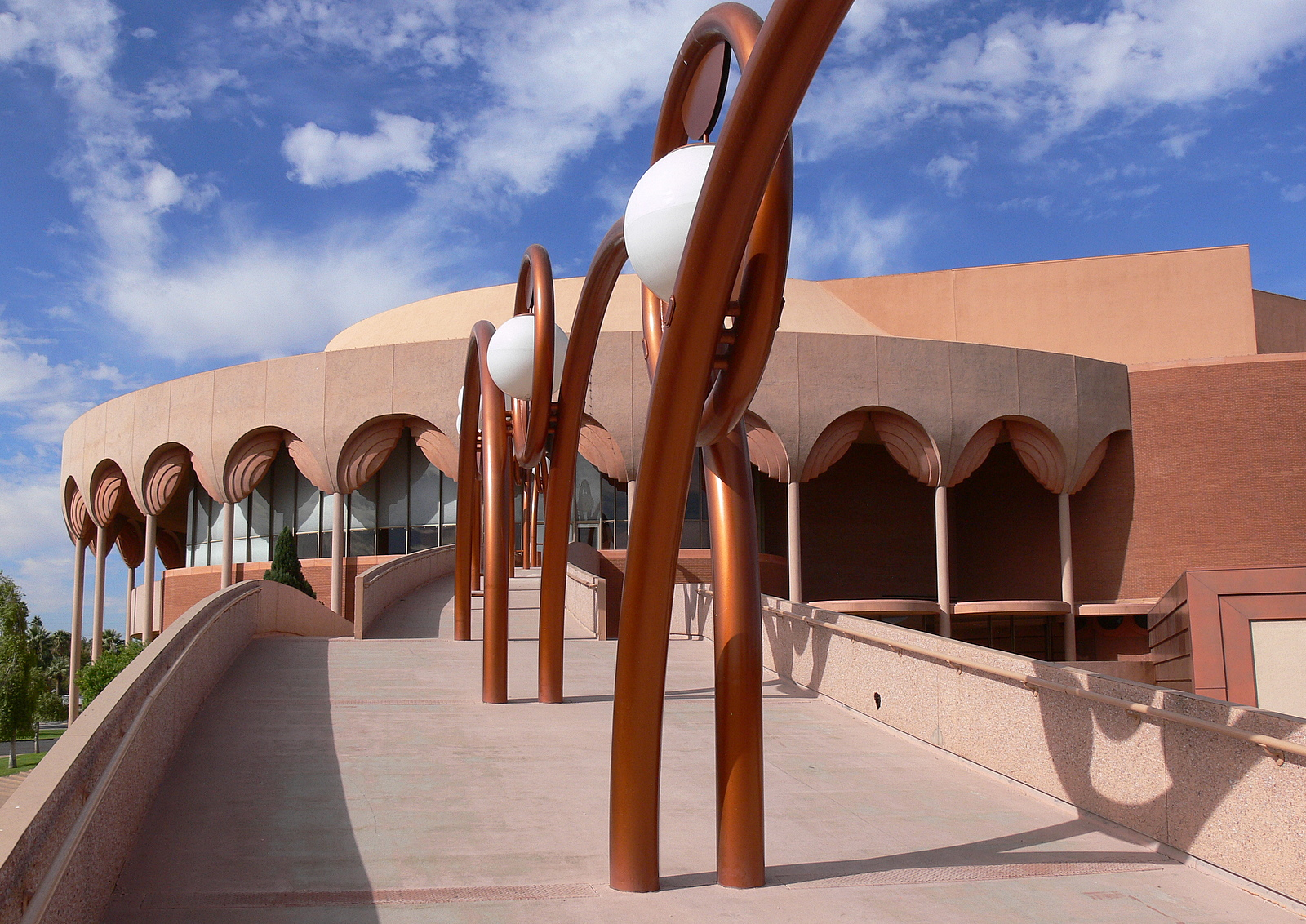
ASU's Gammage Auditorium, designed by Frank Lloyd Wright

In 1933, Grady Gammage, then president of Arizona State Teachers College at Flagstaff, became president of Arizona State Teachers College at Tempe, beginning a tenure that would last for nearly 28 years, second only to Swetman's 30 years at the college's helm. Like President Arthur John Matthews before him, Gammage oversaw the construction of several buildings on the Tempe campus. He also guided the development of the university's graduate programs; the first Master of Arts in Education was awarded in 1938, the first Doctor of Education degree in 1954 and 10 non-teaching master's degrees were approved by the Arizona Board of Regents in 1956. During his presidency, the school's name was changed to Arizona State College in 1945, and finally to Arizona State University in 1958. At the time, two other names were considered: Tempe University and State University at Tempe. Among Gammage's greatest achievements in Tempe was the Frank Lloyd Wright-designed construction of what is Grady Gammage Memorial Auditorium/ASU Gammage. One of the university's hallmark buildings, ASU Gammage was completed in 1964, five years after the president's (and Wright's) death.

Gammage was succeeded by Harold D. Richardson, who had served the school earlier in a variety of roles beginning in 1939, including director of graduate studies, college registrar, dean of instruction, dean of the College of Education and academic vice president. Although filling the role of acting president of the university for just nine months (Dec. 1959 to Sept. 1960), Richardson laid the groundwork for the future recruitment and appointment of well-credentialed research science faculty.

By the 1960s, under G. Homer Durham, the university's 11th president, ASU began to expand its curriculum by establishing several new colleges and, in 1961, the Arizona Board of Regents authorized doctoral degree programs in six fields, including Doctor of Philosophy. By the end of his nine-year tenure, ASU had more than doubled enrollment, reporting 23,000 in 1969.

The next three presidents—Harry K. Newburn (1969–71), John W. Schwada (1971–81) and J. Russell Nelson (1981–89), including and Interim President Richard Peck (1989)—led the university to increased academic stature, the establishment of the ASU West Valley campus in 1984 and its subsequent construction in 1986, a focus on computer-assisted learning and research, and rising enrollment.

=== Since 1990 ===
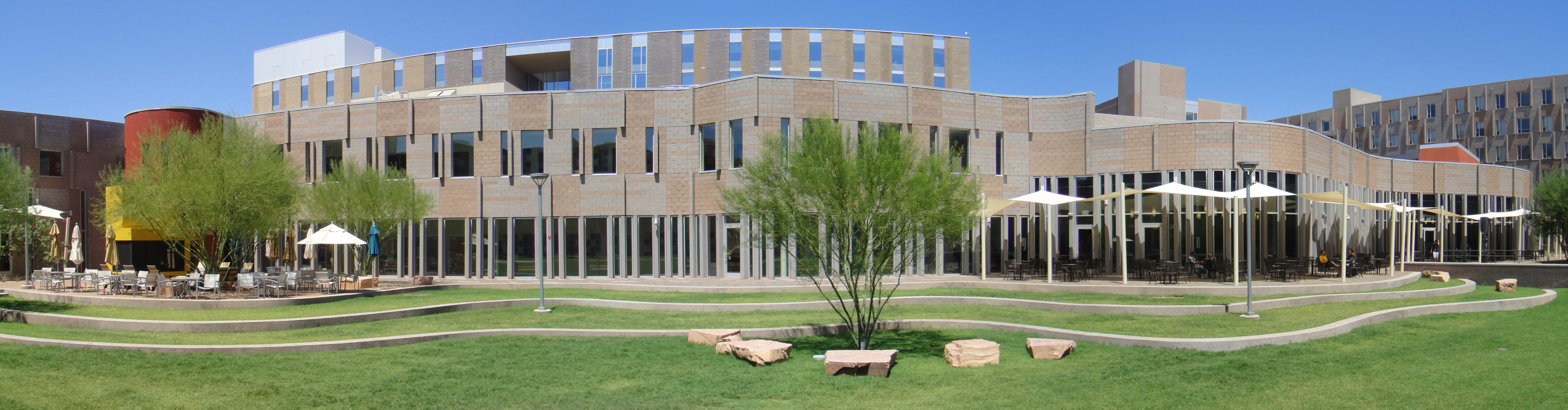
Example of a new academic village, taken at Barrett, The Honors College on the Tempe Campus

Under the leadership of Lattie F. Coor, president from 1990 to 2002, ASU grew through the creation of the Polytechnic campus and extended education sites. Increased commitment to diversity, quality in undergraduate education, research, and economic development occurred over his 12-year tenure. Part of Coor's legacy to the university was a successful fundraising campaign: through private donations, more than $500 million was invested in areas that would significantly impact the future of ASU. Among the campaign's achievements were the naming and endowing of Barrett, The Honors College, and the Herberger Institute for Design and the Arts; the creation of many new endowed faculty positions; and hundreds of new scholarships and fellowships.

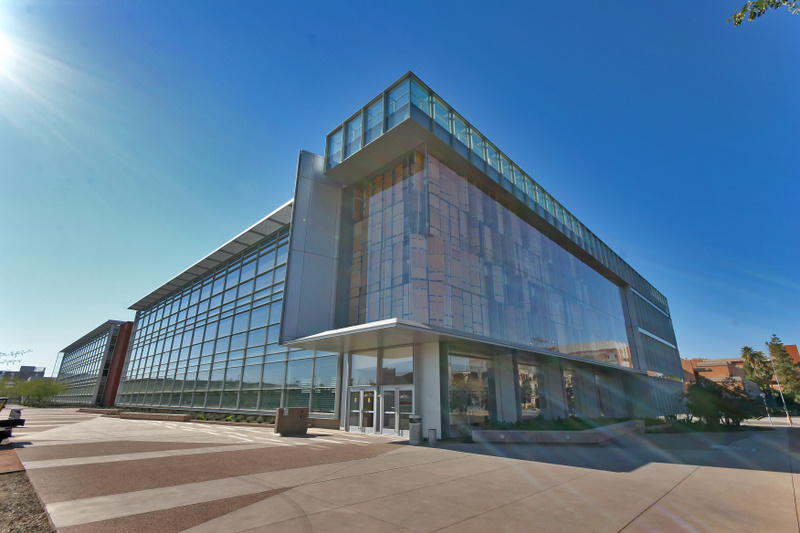
ASU's Biodesign Institute on Tempe campus

In 2002, Michael M. Crow became the university's 16th president. At his inauguration, he outlined his vision for transforming ASU into a "New American University"—one that would be open and inclusive, and set a goal for the university to meet Association of American Universities criteria and to become a member. Crow initiated the transformation of ASU into "One university in many places"—a single institution comprising several campuses, sharing students, faculty, staff and accreditation. Subsequent reorganizations combined academic departments, consolidated colleges and schools, and reduced staff and administration as the university expanded its West Valley and Polytechnic campuses. ASU's Downtown Phoenix campus was also expanded, with several colleges and schools relocating there. The university established learning centers throughout the state, including the ASU Colleges at Lake Havasu City and programs in Thatcher, Yuma, and Tucson. Students at these centers can choose from several ASU degree and certificate programs.

During Crow's tenure, and aided by hundreds of millions of dollars in donations, ASU began a years-long research facility capital building effort that led to the establishment of the Biodesign Institute at Arizona State University, the Julie Ann Wrigley Global Institute of Sustainability, and several large interdisciplinary research buildings. Along with the research facilities, the university faculty was expanded, including the addition of five Nobel Laureates. Since 2002, the university's research expenditures have tripled and more than 1.5 million square feet of space has been added to the university's research facilities.

The economic downturn that began in 2008 took a particularly hard toll on Arizona, resulting in large cuts to ASU's budget. In response to these cuts, ASU capped enrollment, closed some four dozen academic programs, combined academic departments, consolidated colleges and schools, and reduced university faculty, staff and administrators; with an economic recovery underway in 2011, however, the university continued its campaign to expand the West Valley and Polytechnic Campuses, and establish a low-cost, teaching-focused extension campus in Lake Havasu City. As of 2011, an article in Slate reported that, "the bottom line looks good", noting that:

Since Crow's arrival, ASU's research funding has almost tripled to nearly $350 million. Degree production has increased by 45 percent. And thanks to an ambitious aid program, enrollment of students from Arizona families below poverty is up 647 percent.

On May 1, 2014, ASU was listed as one of fifty-five higher education institutions under investigation by the Office of Civil Rights "for possible violations of federal law over the handling of sexual violence and harassment complaints" by Barack Obama's White House Task Force To Protect Students from Sexual Assault. The publicly announced investigation followed two Title IX suits. In July 2014, a group of at least nine registered and former students who alleged they were harassed or assaulted asked the federal investigation be expanded. In August 2014 ASU president Michael Crow appointed a task force comprising faculty and staff, students, and members of the university police force to review the university's efforts to address sexual violence. Crow accepted the recommendations of the task force in November 2014.

In 2015, the Thunderbird School of Global Management became the Thunderbird School of Global Management at ASU. Partnerships for education and research with Mayo Clinic established collaborative degree programs in health care and law, and shared administrator positions, laboratories and classes at the Mayo Clinic Arizona campus.

The Beus Center for Law and Society, the new home of ASU's Sandra Day O'Connor College of Law, opened in fall 2016 on the Downtown Phoenix campus, relocating faculty and students from the Tempe campus to the state capital.

In September 2024, ASU announced several cuts in response to state budget cuts, including the closure of the Lake Havasu City campus, a reduction of the Arizona Teachers Academy and the addition of a "tuition surcharge".

== Organization and administration ==
Colleges and schools of Arizona State University
College/school	Year founded
Barrett, The Honors College	1988
W. P. Carey School of Business	1961
Walter Cronkite School of Journalism and Mass Communication	1941
Edson College of Nursing and Health Innovation	1957
Ira A. Fulton Schools of Engineering	1954
Mary Lou Fulton College for Teaching and Learning Innovation	1954
College of Global Futures	2020
College of Health Solutions	2012
Herberger Institute for Design and the Arts	1964
College of Integrative Sciences and Arts	2014
The College of Liberal Arts and Sciences	1954
New College of Interdisciplinary Arts and Sciences	1984
Sandra Day O'Connor College of Law	1964
School of Technology for Public Health	2025
Thunderbird School of Global Management at ASU	1946
University College	2011
Watts College of Public Service & Community Solutions	1979

The Arizona Board of Regents (ABOR) governs Arizona State University as well as the state's other public universities: University of Arizona and Northern Arizona University. The board is composed of 12 members including 11 who are voting members, and one non-voting member. Members of the board include the state governor and superintendent of public instruction acting as ex-officio members, eight volunteer Regents members with eight-year terms who are appointed by the governor, and two student regents, each with two-year terms, and each serving a one-year term as non-voting apprentices. ABOR provides policy guidance to the state universities of Arizona. ASU has four campuses in metropolitan Phoenix, Arizona, including the Tempe campus in Tempe; the West Valley campus in Glendale; the Downtown Phoenix campus; and the Polytechnic campus in Mesa. ASU also offers courses and degrees through ASU Online and at the ASU Colleges at Lake Havasu City in western Arizona, and offers regional learning programs in Thatcher, Yuma and Tucson.

The Arizona Board of Regents appoints and elects the president of the university, who is considered the institution's chief executive officer and the chief budget officer. The president executes measures enacted by the Board of Regents, controls the university's property, and acts as the university's official representative to the Board of Regents. The chief executive officer is assisted through the administration of the institution by the provost, vice presidents, deans, faculty, directors, department chairs, and other officers. The president also selects and appoints administrative officers and general counsels. The 16th ASU president is Michael M. Crow, who has served since July 1, 2002.

== Campuses and locations ==
ASU has four campuses in the Phoenix metropolitan area and regional learning centers throughout Arizona, in addition to facilities located in Los Angeles, Washington, D.C., and Hawaii. Unlike most multi-campus institutions, ASU describes itself as "one university in many places", implying there is "not a system with separate campuses, and not one main campus with branch campuses". The university considers each campus "distinctive" and academically focused on certain aspects of the overall university mission. The Tempe campus is the university's research and graduate school center. Undergraduate studies on the Tempe campus are research-based programs that prepare students for graduate school, professional school, or employment. The Polytechnic campus is designed with an emphasis on professional and technological programs for direct workforce preparation. The Polytechnic campus is the site of many of the university's simulators and laboratories dedicated for project-based learning. The West Valley campus is focused on interdisciplinary degrees and the liberal arts, while maintaining professional programs with a direct impact on the community and society. The Downtown Phoenix campus focuses on direct urban and public programs such as nursing, public policy, criminal justice, mass communication, journalism, and law, as well as the Thunderbird School of Global Management. Valley Metro Rail connects the Tempe and Downtown Phoenix campuses, and inter-campus shuttles allow students and faculty to easily travel between the campuses. In addition to in-person classes, ASU Online, with its headquarters in Los Arcos Mall#SkySong in Scottsdale, provides online and extended education.

In 2018, the Arizona Board of Regents reported that the ASU facilities inventory totaled more than 23 million gross square feet.

=== Tempe campus ===
ASU's Tempe campus is in downtown Tempe, Arizona, about eight miles (13 km) east of Phoenix. The campus is considered urban and is approximately 660 acres (2.7 km^{2}) in size. It is arranged around broad pedestrian malls and is completely encompassed by an arboretum. The Tempe campus is also the largest of ASU's campuses, with 55,312 students enrolled as of fall 2025. The campus is considered to range from the streets Rural Road on the east to Mill Avenue on the west, and Apache Boulevard on the south to Rio Salado Parkway on the north.

The Tempe campus is ASU's original campus, and Old Main, the oldest building on campus, still stands. Today's university and the Tempe campus were founded as the Territorial Normal School when first constructed, and was originally a teachers college. There are many notable landmarks on campus, including Grady Gammage Memorial Auditorium, designed by Frank Lloyd Wright; Palm Walk, which is lined by 111 palm trees; Charles Trumbull Hayden Library; the University Club building; Margaret Gisolo Dance Theatre; Arizona State University Art Museum; and University Bridge. Furthermore, the Tempe campus is home to Barrett, The Honors College. In addition, the campus has an extensive public art collection; It was named "the single most impressive venue for contemporary art in Arizona" by Art in America magazine. Against the northwest edge of campus is the Mill Avenue district (part of downtown Tempe), which has a college atmosphere that attracts many students to its restaurants and bars. Students also have Tempe Marketplace, a shopping, dining and entertainment center with an outdoor setting near the northeast border of the campus. The Tempe campus is also home to all of the university's athletic facilities.

Old Main, the oldest building on campus

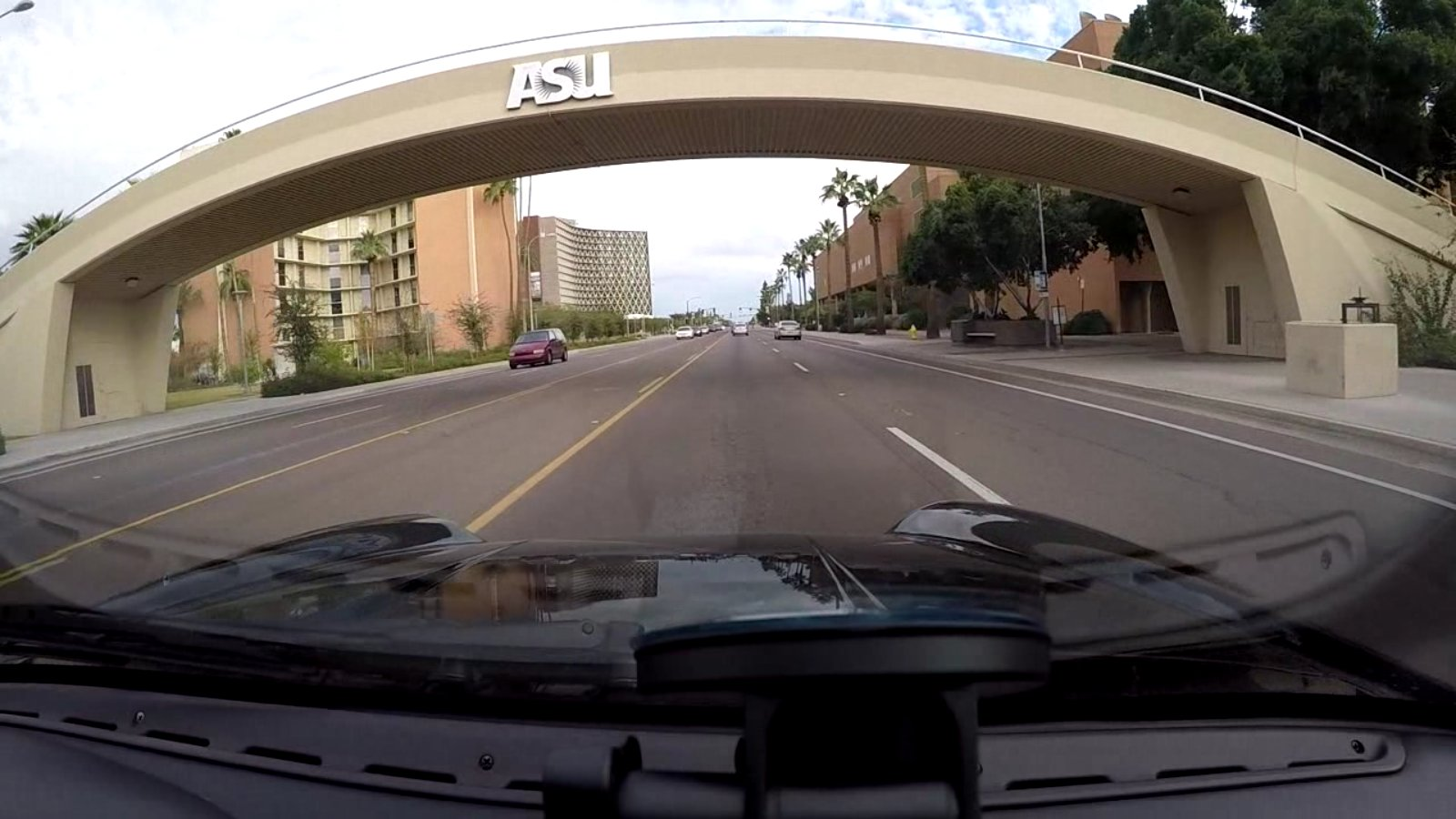
The ASU Bridge

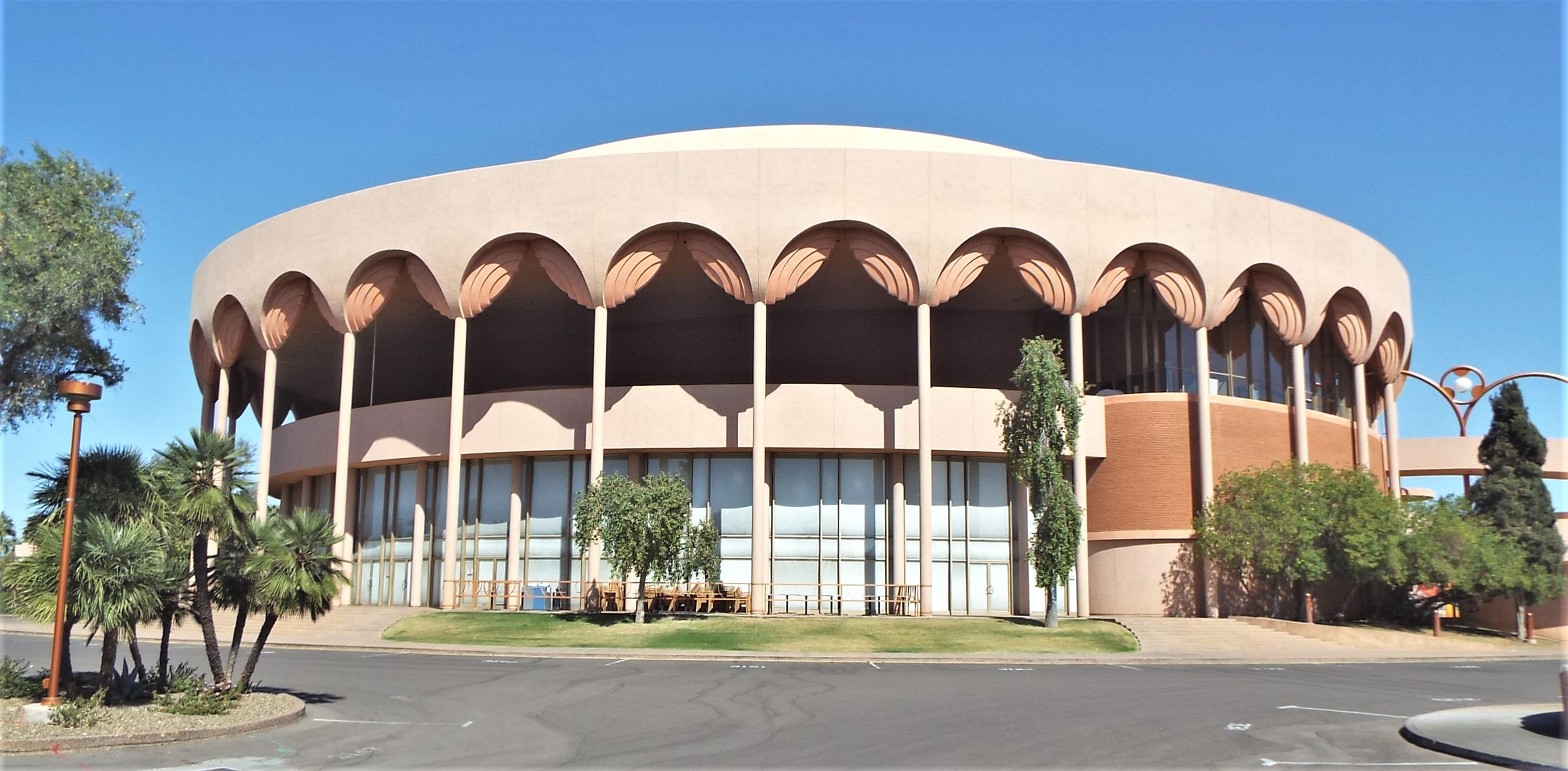
The Gammage Auditorium was designed by Frank Lloyd Wright.

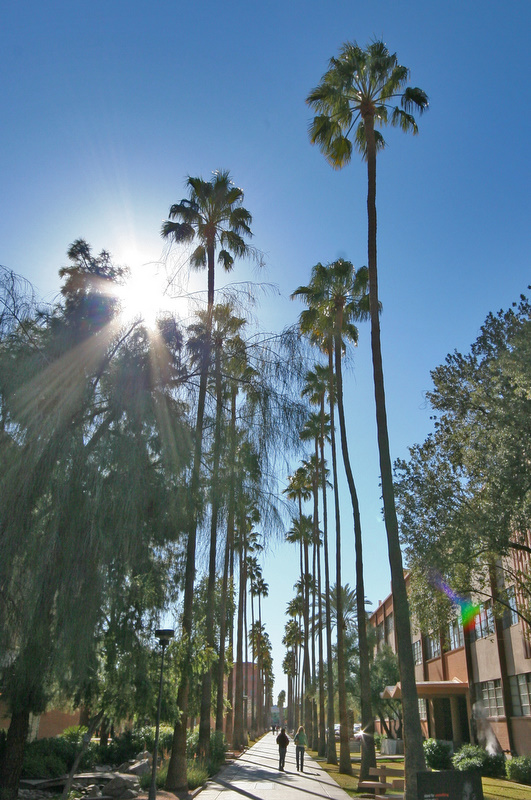
The Palm Walk is the main pathway through the campus.

=== West Valley campus ===
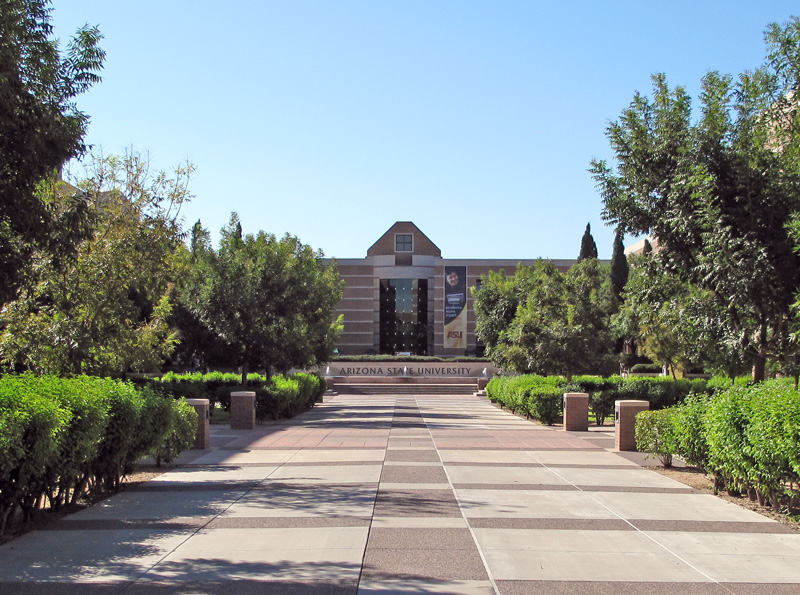
Fletcher Library, West Valley campus

Established in 1984 by the Arizona legislature, the West Valley campus sits on 277.92 acres (1.1247 km^{2}) in a suburban area of northwest Phoenix. The West Valley campus lies about 12 miles (19 km) northwest of Downtown Phoenix, and about 18 miles (29 km) northwest of the Tempe campus. The West Valley campus is designated as a Phoenix Point of Pride and is nearly completely powered by a solar array. The campus serves 5,299 students as of fall 2025 and offers more than 100 degree programs from the New College of Interdisciplinary Arts and Sciences, the Mary Lou Fulton Teachers College, W. P. Carey School of Business, College of Public Service and Community Solutions, College of Health Solutions, and the College of Nursing and Health Innovation.

=== Polytechnic campus ===
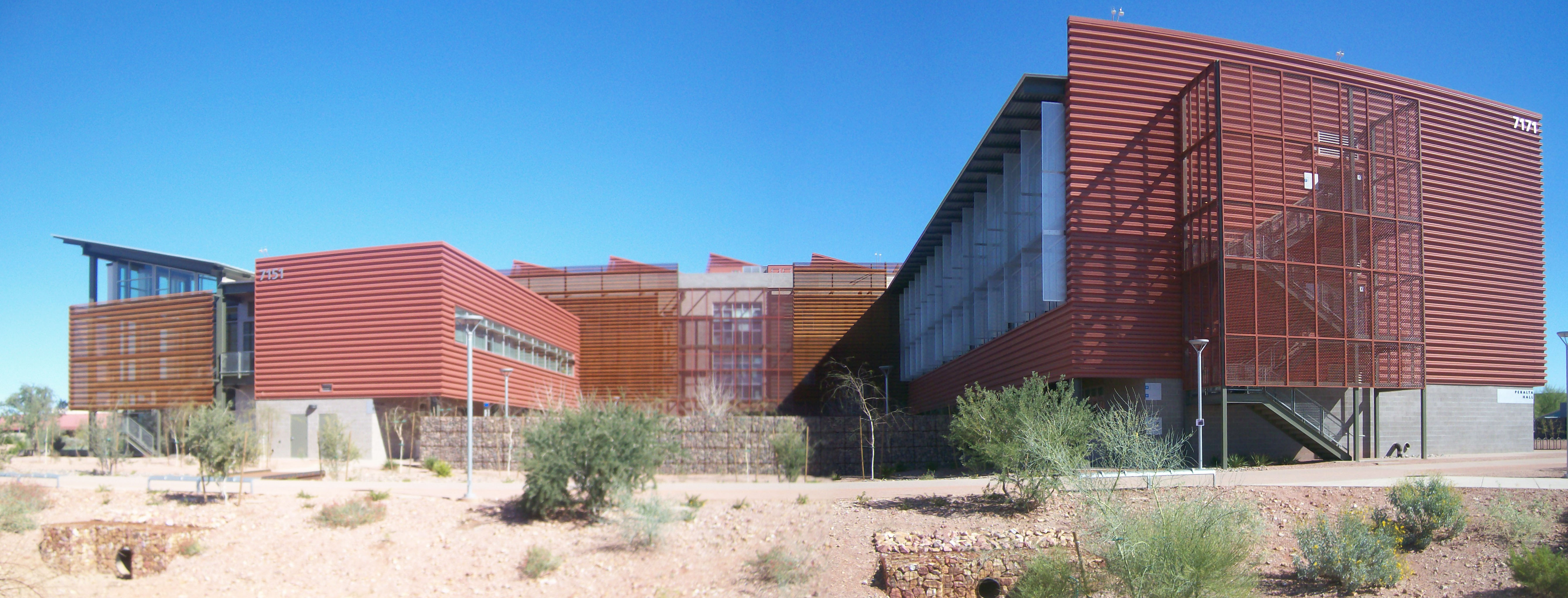
Picacho Hall (left) and Peralta Hall (right) at the Polytechnic campus

Founded in 1996 as "ASU East", the ASU Polytechnic campus serves 6,170 students as of fall 2025 and is home to more than 130 bachelor's, master's and doctoral degrees in professional, technical science, humanities, social science and pre-health programs through the W. P. Carey School of Business/Morrison School of Management and Agribusiness, Mary Lou Fulton Teachers College, Ira A. Fulton Schools of Engineering, and College of Integrative Sciences and Arts. The campus — a desert arboretum — includes outdoor learning labs and spaces as well as leading-edge simulators and indoor lab spaces to support teaching and research in various fields of study. The 600-acre (2.4 km^{2}) campus is in southeast Mesa, Arizona, approximately 25 miles (40 km) southeast of the Tempe campus, and 33 miles (53 km) southeast of downtown Phoenix. The Polytechnic campus sits on the former Williams Air Force Base and is adjacent to the Phoenix-Mesa Gateway Airport and Chandler-Gilbert Community College (Williams campus).

=== Downtown Phoenix campus ===
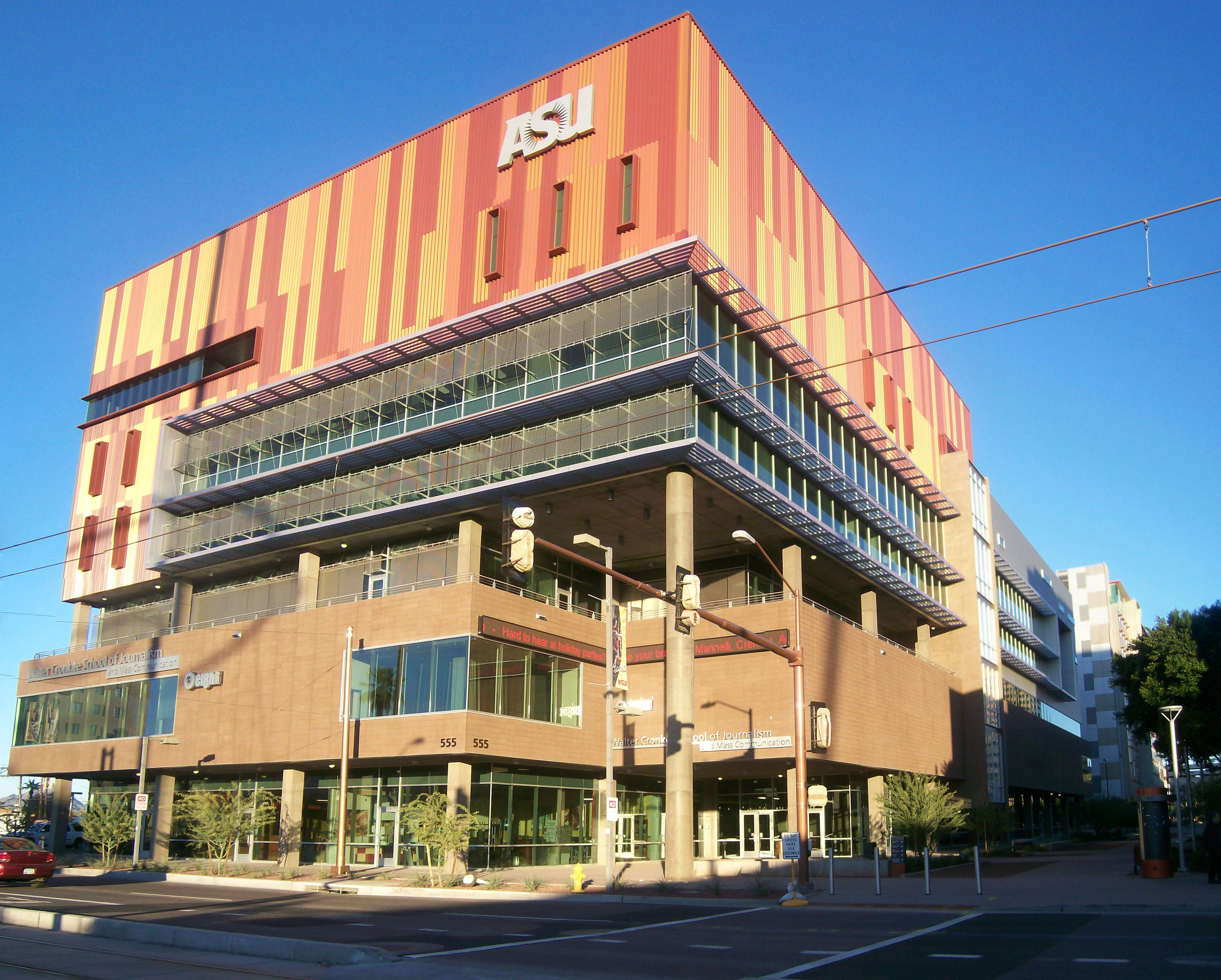
Walter Cronkite School of Journalism, Downtown Phoenix Campus

The Downtown Phoenix campus was established in 2006 on the north side of Downtown Phoenix. The campus has an urban design, with several large modern academic buildings intermingled with commercial and retail office buildings. In addition to the new buildings, the campus included the adaptive reuse of several existing structures, including a 1930s era Post Office that is on the National Register of Historic Places. Serving 10,769 students as of fall 2025, the campus houses the College of Health Solutions, College of Integrative Science and Arts, College of Nursing and Health Innovation, Watts College of Public Service & Community Solutions, Mary Lou Fulton Teachers College, and Walter Cronkite School of Journalism and Mass Communication. In 2013, the campus added the Sun Devil Fitness Center in conjunction with the original YMCA building. ASU's Sandra Day O'Connor College of Law relocated from Tempe to the Downtown Phoenix campus in 2016.

=== ASU Online ===
ASU Online offers more than 150 undergraduate and graduate degree programs through an online platform. The degree programs delivered online hold the same accreditation as the university's traditional face-to-face programs. ASU Online is headquartered at ASU's SkySong campus in Scottsdale, Arizona. As of 2018, ASU Online was ranked in the Top 4 for Best Online Bachelor's Programs by U.S. News & World Report.

Online students are taught by the same faculty and receive the same diploma as on-campus students. ASU online programs allow students to learn in highly interactive environments through student collaboration and through technological personalized learning environments.

In April 2015, ASU Online announced a partnership with edX to form a one of a kind program called the Global Freshman Academy. The program is open to all potential students. The students do not need to submit a high school transcript or GPA to apply for the courses.

As of spring 2017, more than 25,000 students were enrolled through ASU Online. In June 2014, ASU Online and Starbucks announced a partnership called the Starbucks College Achievement Plan. The Starbucks College Achievement Plan offers all benefits-eligible employees full-tuition coverage when they enroll in any one of ASU Online's undergraduate degree programs.

=== Other facilities ===
==== Mayo Clinic School of Medicine, in collaboration with ASU ====
In 2016, Mayo Clinic and ASU formed a new platform for health care education and research: the Mayo Clinic and Arizona State University Alliance for Health Care. Beginning in 2017, Mayo Clinic School of Medicine students in Phoenix and Scottsdale are among the first to earn a certificate in the Science of Health Care Delivery, with the option to earn a master's degree in the Science of Health Care Delivery through ASU.

==== Barrett & O'Connor Washington Center ====
Following a nearly 15-year presence in Washington, D.C., through more minor means, ASU opened the Barrett and O'Connor Center in 2018 to solidify the university's contacts with the capital city. The center houses ASU's D.C.-based academic programs, including the Washington Bureau of the Walter Cronkite School of Journalism and Mass Communication, the Sandra Day O'Connor College of Law Rule of Law and Governance program, the Capital Scholars program, and the McCain Institute's Next Generation Leaders program, among many others. In addition to hosting classes and internships on-site, special lectures and seminars taught from the Barrett & O'Connor Washington Center are connected to classrooms in Arizona through video-conferencing technology. The Barrett and O'Connor center is located at 1800 I St NW, Washington, DC 20006, close to the White House.

==== Arizona State University in California ====
ASU operates its "California Center" in Los Angeles across two buildings: the former Herald Examiner Building (known as ASU California Center Broadway) and ASU California Center Grand, previously home to the Fashion Institute of Design & Merchandising. The center offers undergraduate and graduate degree programs, executive education, workshops and seminars. In 2022, ASU acquired a small nonprofit college, Columbia College Hollywood, and renamed it California College of ASU. In 2023, ASU reached an agreement with the for-profit Fashion Institute of Design & Merchandising to take over some of its academic programs, creating ASU FIDM.

==== ASU Colleges at Lake Havasu City ====
In response to demands for lower-cost public higher education in Arizona, ASU developed a small, undergraduate-only college in Lake Havasu City. ASU Colleges was teaching-focused and provided a selection of popular undergraduate majors at lower tuition rates than other Arizona research universities and a 15-to-1 student-to-faculty ratio.The campus closed in June 2025 in response to state budget cuts.

== Academics ==
=== Admissions ===
Fall first-year statistics (Tempe Campus only)
	Fall 2019	Fall 2018	Fall 2017	Fall 2016	Fall 2015
Applicants	34,188	26,869	34,181	33,466	33,575
Admits	29,562	22,779	28,096	27,111	27,452
% Admitted	86.5	84.8	82.2	81.0	81.8
Enrolled	10,044	8,861	10,278	10,415	10,391
Avg. HS GPA	3.53	3.54	3.53	3.49	3.48

Fall First-Year Statistics (ASU Systemwide)
	Fall 2021	Fall 2020
Applicants	61,603	53516
Admits	54,329	47290
% Admitted	88.2	88.3
Enrolled	14,250	12,677
Avg. HS GPA	3.54	3.52

As of August 2022, ASU had a systemwide enrolled student population (both in-person and online) of 140,759, a 4% increase over the systemwide total in 2021. Out of that total, approximately 79,000 students were enrolled in-person at one of the ASU campuses, an increase of 3.2% from 2021. Just over 61,000 students were enrolled in ASU Online courses and programs as of August 2022, an increase of roughly 7% in online student enrollment from the previous year.

According to the U.S. News & World Report, for the 2022–2023 academic year, ASU admitted 88% of all freshman applicants and classified the school's admissions in the "selective" category. The average high school GPA of incoming first-year students for the 2022–23 academic year was 3.54.

Barrett, The Honors College is ranked among the top honors programs in the nation. Although there are no set minimum admissions criteria for Barrett College, the average GPA of Fall 2017 incoming freshmen was 3.78, with an average SAT score of 1380 and an average ACT score of 29. The Honors college has 7,236 students, with 719 National Merit Scholars.

ASU enrolls 10,268 international students, 14.3% of the total student population. The international student body represents more than 150 nations. The Institute of International Education ranked ASU as the top public university in the U.S. for hosting international students in 2016–2017.

In June 2022, Arizona State University was designated a Hispanic-serving institution (HSI) by the United States Department of Education in recognition of the fact that for the first time in the school's history, during the fall semester of 2021 Hispanic students comprised over 25% of the university's total undergraduate enrollment.

=== Academic programs ===
Undergraduate and graduate enrollment
	Fall 2021	Fall 2020	Fall 2019	Fall 2018	Fall 2017	Fall 2016	Fall 2015	Fall 2014	Fall 2013
Undergraduate	107,425	103,609	96,726	89,888	83,544	79,442	74,139	67,498	62,082
Graduate	28,304	25,179	23,225	21,361	19,986	18,704	17,183	15,762	14,646
Total campus-based enrollment	77,881	74,795	75,698	73,875	72,947	72,362	71,305	69,511	66,770
Online	53,933	53,993	44,253	37,374	30,583	25,784	20,017	13,749	9,958
Total including online enrollment	135,729	128,788	119,951	111,249	103,530	98,146	91,322	83,260	76,728

ASU offers over 350 majors to undergraduate students, and more than 100 graduate programs leading to numerous masters and doctoral degrees in the liberal arts and sciences, design and arts, engineering, journalism, education, business, law, nursing, public policy, technology, and sustainability. These programs are divided into 16 colleges and schools that are spread across ASU's six campuses. ASU also offers the 4+1 accelerated program, which allows students in their senior year to attain their master's degree the following year. The 4+1 accelerated program is not associated with all majors; for example, in the Mary Lou Fulton Teachers College the 4+1 accelerated program only works with Education Exploratory majors. ASU uses a plus-minus grading system with highest cumulative GPA awarded of 4.0 (at time of graduation). Arizona State University is accredited by the Higher Learning Commission. ASU is one of only four universities in the country to offer a certificate in veterans studies.

=== Rankings ===
Academic rankings

National
- Forbes: 111
- U.S. News & World Report: 121 (tie)
- Washington Monthly: 32
- WSJ/College Pulse: 252

Global
- ARWU: 101–150
- QS: 172
- THE: 201–250
- U.S. News & World Report: 179 (tie)

National program rankings (as of 2025)
Program	Ranking
Audiology	41 (tie)
Biological Sciences	58 (tie)
Business	35 (tie)
Chemistry	51 (tie)
Clinical Psychology	31 (tie)
Computer Science	39 (tie)
Criminology	2 (tie)
Earth Sciences	14 (tie)
Economics	37 (tie)
Education	20 (tie)
Engineering	47 (tie)
English	54 (tie)
Fine Arts	15 (tie)
History	86 (tie)
Law	45
Mathematics	55 (tie)
Nursing: Doctorate	26
Nursing: Master's	Unranked
Physics	50 (tie)
Political Science	52 (tie)
Psychology	47 (tie)
Public Affairs	11 (tie)
Social Work	20 (tie)
Speech–Language Pathology	21 (tie)
Statistics	49 (tie)

Global program rankings (as of 2025)
Program	Ranking
Arts & Humanities	83
Biology & Biochemistry	231
Chemical Engineering	218 (tie)
Chemistry	233 (tie)
Civil Engineering	179
Clinical Medicine	521 (tie)
Computer Science	153
Condensed Matter Physics	221
Ecology	89
Economics & Business	58 (tie)
Education & Educational Research	25
Electrical & Electronic Engineering	159
Energy & Fuels	291 (tie)
Engineering	139
Environmental Engineering	124 (tie)
Environment/Ecology	48
Geosciences	85
Green & Sustainable Science & Technology	172
Materials Science	193
Mathematics	406
Microbiology	98 (tie)
Molecular Biology & Genetics	338 (tie)
Nanoscience & Nanotechnology	247 (tie)
Neuroscience & Behavior	437 (tie)
Physical Chemistry	195 (tie)
Physics	317
Plant & Animal Science	285 (tie)
Psychiatry/Psychology	106 (tie)
Public, Environmental & Occupational Health	230 (tie)
Social Sciences & Public Health	60
Space Science	69 (tie)

The 2027 U.S. News & World Report ratings ranked ASU tied for 121st among universities in the United States and tied for 179th globally. It was also tied for 58th among public universities in the United States, and was ranked 1st among "most innovative schools", tied for 17th in "best undergraduate teaching", 166th in "best value schools", and tied for 173rd in "top performers on social mobility" among national universities in the U.S. The innovation ranking, new for 2016, was determined by a poll of top college officials nationwide asking them to name institutions "that are making the most innovative improvements in terms of curriculum, faculty, students, campus life, technology or facilities".

ASU is ranked 49th–58th in the U.S. and 151st–200th in the world among the top 1000 universities in the 2025 Academic Ranking of World Universities, and 65th U.S./196th in the world by the 2025 Center for World University Rankings. Money magazine ranked ASU 124th in the country out of 739 schools evaluated for its 2020 "Best Colleges for Your Money" edition. The Wall Street Journal ranks ASU 5th in the nation for producing the best-qualified graduates, determined by a nationwide poll of corporate recruiters.

ASU's Walter Cronkite School of Journalism and Mass Communication has been named one of America's top 10 journalism schools by national publications and organizations for more than a decade. The rankings include: College Magazine (10th), Quality Education and Jobs (6th), and International Student (1st).

ASU is also one of 250 global universities selected for the Emerging Group's 2025 Global Employability University Ranking and Survey (GEURS), and is ranked 41st in the world (14th in the U.S.) within this select group.

For its efforts as a national leader in campus sustainability, ASU was named one of the top 6 "Cool Schools" by the Sierra Club in 2017, was named one of the Princeton Review's most sustainable schools in 2015 and earned an "A−" grade on the 2011 College Sustainability Green Report Card.

=== Research and institutes ===
ASU is classified among "R1: Doctoral Universities – Very High Research Activity". The university spent $673 million in fiscal year 2020, ranking it 43rd nationally. ASU is a NASA designated national space-grant institute and a member of the Universities Research Association. In 2023, it became a member of the Association of American Universities, an elite organization of 71 research universities in the U.S. and Canada. The university is ranked in the top 10 for NASA-funded research expenditures.

The university has raised more than $999 million in external funding, and more than 180 companies based on ASU innovations have been launched through the university's exclusive intellectual property management company, Skysong Innovations. The U.S. National Academy of Inventors and the Intellectual Property Owners Association rank ASU in the top 10 nationally and No. 11 globally for U.S. patents awarded to universities in 2020, along with MIT, Stanford and Harvard. ASU jumped to 10th place from 17th in 2017, according to the U.S. National Academy of Inventors and the Intellectual Property Owners Association.

Since its inception, Skysong Innovations has fostered the launch of more than 180 companies based on ASU innovations, and attracted more than $999 million in venture funding, including $96 million in fiscal year 2016 alone. In 2013, the Sweden-based University Business Incubator (UBI) Index, named ASU as one of the top universities in the world for business incubation, ranking 17th. UBI reviewed 550 universities and associated business incubators from around the world using an assessment framework that takes more than 50 performance indicators into consideration. As an example, one of ASU's spin-offs (Heliae Development, LLC) raised more than $28 million in venture capital in 2013 alone. In June 2016, ASU received the Entrepreneurial University Award from the Deshpande Foundation, a philanthropic organization that supports social entrepreneurship and innovation.

The university's push to create various institutes has led to greater funding and an increase in the number of researchers in multiple fields. ASU Knowledge Enterprise (KE) advances research, innovation, strategic partnerships, entrepreneurship, economic development and international development. KE is led by Sally C. Morton. KE supports several interdisciplinary research institutes and initiatives. Other famed institutes at ASU are The Institute of Human Origins, L. William Seidman Research Institute (W. P. Carey School of Business), Learning Sciences Institute, Herberger Research Institute, and the Hispanic Research Center. The Biodesign Institute for instance, conducts research on issues such as biomedical and health care outcomes as part of a collaboration with Mayo Clinic to diagnose and treat diseases. The institute has attracted more than $760 million in external funding, filed 860 invention disclosures, nearly 200 patents, and generated 35 spinout companies based on its research.

In the early months of the COVID-19 pandemic, Biodesign developed a rapid, saliva-based testing option for the university community, and partnered with the Arizona Department of Health Services to make the saliva-based COVID test available to the public. In October 2021, Biodesign announced their millionth test. The institute also is heavily involved in sustainability research, primarily through reuse of CO_{2} via biological feedback and various biomasses (e.g. algae) to synthesize clean biofuels. Heliae is a Biodesign Institute spin-off and much of its business centers on algal-derived, high value products. Furthermore, the institute is heavily involved in security research including technology that can detect biological and chemical changes in the air and water. The university has received more than $30 million in funding from the Department of Defense for adapting this technology for use in detecting the presence of biological and chemical weapons. Research conducted at the Biodesign Institute by ASU professor Charles Arntzen made possible the production of Ebola antibodies in specially modified tobacco plants that researchers at Mapp Biopharmaceutical used to create the Ebola therapeutic ZMapp. The treatment is credited with saving the lives of two aid workers. For his work, Arntzen was named the No. 1 honoree among Fast Company's annual "100 Most Creative People in Business" 2015 awards.

World-renowned scholars have been integral to the successes of the institutes associated with the university. ASU students and researchers have been selected as Marshall, Truman, Rhodes, and Fulbright Scholars with the university ranking 1st overall in the U.S. for Fulbright Scholar awards to faculty and 5th overall for recipients of Fulbright U.S. Student awards in the 2015–2016 academic year. ASU faculty includes Nobel Laureates, Royal Society members, National Academy members, and members of the National Institutes of Health. ASU Professor Donald Johanson, who discovered the 3.18 million year old fossil hominid Lucy (Australopithecus) in Ethiopia, established the Institute of Human Origins (IHO) in 1981. The institute was established in Berkeley, California, and later moved to ASU in 1997. As one of the leading research organizations in the United States devoted to the science of human origins, IHO pursues a transdisciplinary strategy for field and analytical paleoanthropological research.

The Herberger Institute Research Center supports the scholarly inquiry, applied research and creative activity of more than 400 faculty and nearly 5,000 students. The renowned ASU Art Museum, Herberger Institute Community Programs, urban design, and other outreach and initiatives in the arts community round out the research and creative activities of the Herberger Institute. Among well known professors within the Herberger Institute is Johnny Saldaña of the School of Theatre and Film. Saldaña received the 1996 Distinguished Book Award and the prestigious Judith Kase Cooper Honorary Research Award, both from the American Alliance for Theatre Education (AATE). The Julie Ann Wrigley Global Institute of Sustainability is the center of ASU's initiatives focusing on practical solutions to environmental, economic, and social challenges. The institute has partnered with various cities, universities, and organizations from around the world to address issues affecting the global community.

ASU is also involved with NASA in the field of space exploration. To meet the needs of NASA programs, ASU built the LEED Gold Certified, 298,000-square-foot Interdisciplinary Science and Technology Building IV (ISTB 4) at a cost of $110 million in 2012. The building includes space for the School of Earth and Space Exploration (SESE) and includes labs and other facilities for the Ira A. Fulton Schools of Engineering. One of the main projects at ISTB 4 includes the OSIRIS-REx Thermal Emission Spectrometer (OTES). Although ASU built the spectrometers aboard the Martian rovers Spirit and Opportunity, OTES will be the first major scientific instrument completely designed and built at ASU for a NASA space mission. Phil Christensen, the principal investigator for the Mars Global Surveyor Thermal Emission Spectrometer (TES), is a Regents' Professor at ASU. He also serves as the principal investigator for the Mars Odyssey THEMIS instruments, as well as co-investigator for the Mars Exploration Rovers. ASU scientists are responsible for the Mini-TES instruments aboard the Mars Exploration Rovers. The Buseck Center for Meteorite Studies, which is home to rare Martian meteorites and exotic fragments from space, and the Mars Space Flight Facility are on ASU's Tempe campus. In 2017, Lindy Elkins-Tanton of ASU was selected by NASA to lead a deep space mission to Psyche, a metal asteroid believed to be a former planetary core. The $450 million project is the first NASA mission led by the university.

The Army Research Laboratory extended funding for the Arizona State University Flexible Display Center (FDC) in 2009 with a $50 million grant. The university has partnered with the Pentagon on such endeavors since 2004 with an initial $43.7 million grant. In 2012, researchers at the center created the world's largest flexible full-color organic light-emitting diode (OLED), which at the time was 7.4 inches. The following year, the FEDC staff broke their own world record, producing a 14.7-inch version of the display. The technology delivers high-performance while remaining cost-effective during the manufacturing process. Vibrant colors, high switching speeds for video and reduced power consumption are some of the features the center has integrated into the technology. In 2012, ASU eliminated the need for specialized equipment and processing, thereby reducing costs compared to competitive approaches.

=== Luminosity Lab ===
The Luminosity Lab is a student-led research and development think tank located on the Tempe campus of ASU. It was founded in 2016 by Dr. Mark Naufel. Fifteen students from multiple disciplines were selected for the initial team.

=== Libraries ===
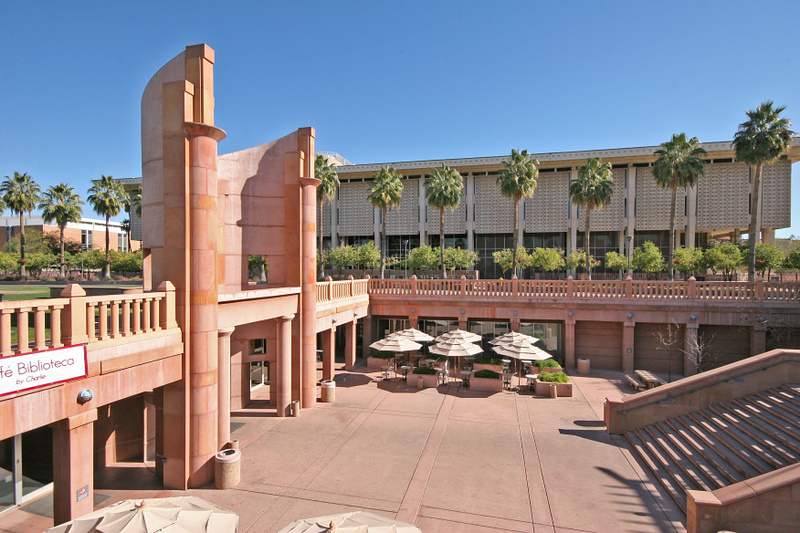
The underground entrance to Hayden Library, Tempe campus

ASU's faculty and students are served by nine libraries across five campuses: Hayden Library, Noble Library, Music Library and Design and the Arts Library on the Tempe campus; Fletcher Library on the West campus; Downtown Phoenix campus library and Ross-Blakley Law Library at the Downtown Phoenix campus; Polytechnic campus library; and the Thunderbird Library at the Thunderbird campus.

As of 2013, ASU's libraries held 4.5 million volumes. The Arizona State University library system is ranked the 34th largest research library in the United States and Canada, according to criteria established by the Association of Research Libraries that measures various aspects of quality and size of the collection. The university continues to grow its special collections, such as the recent addition of a privately held collection of manuscripts by poet Rubén Darío.

Hayden Library is on Cady Mall in the center of the Tempe campus. It opened in 1966 and is the largest library facility at ASU. An expansion in 1989 created a subterranean entrance underneath Hayden Lawn and is attached to the above-ground portion of the original library. There are two floors underneath Hayden Lawn with a landmark known as the "Beacon of Knowledge" rising from the center. The underground library lights the beacon at night. More expansions were completed in 2013 and 2020.

The 2013 capital improvement plan approved by the Arizona Board of Regents, incorporated a $35 million repurposing and renovation project for Hayden Library. The open air moat area that serves as an outdoor study space will be enclosed to increase indoor space for the library. Along with increasing space and renovating the facility, the front entrance of Hayden Library was rebuilt.

== Sustainability ==
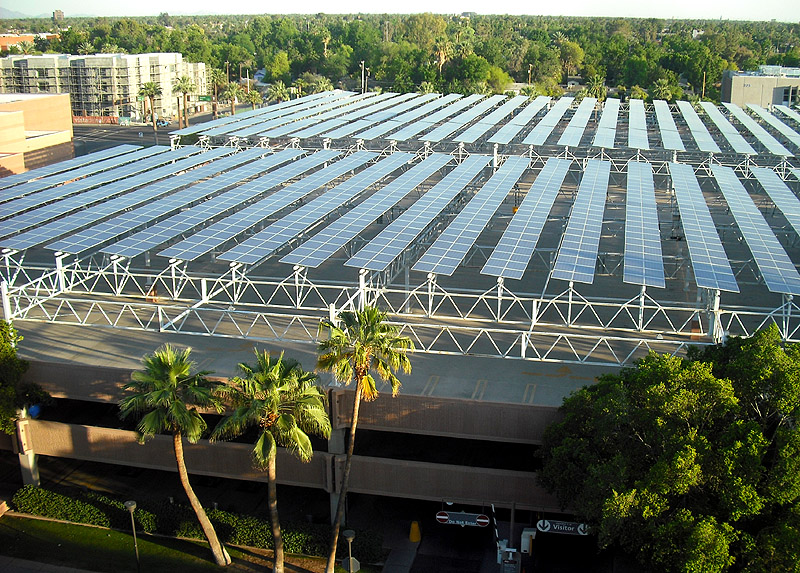
Solar panel array on the roof deck of ASU's parking structure on Apache Blvd. in Tempe

As of March 2014, ASU was the top institution of higher education in the United States for solar generating capacity. As of May 2016, the university generated over 24 megawatts (MW) of electricity from on-campus solar arrays. This was an increase over the June 2012 total of 15.3 MW. ASU has 88 solar photovoltaic (PV) installations containing 81,424 solar panels across four campuses and the ASU Research Park. An additional 29 MWdc solar installation was dedicated at Red Rock, Pinal County, Arizona, in January 2017, bringing the university's solar generating capacity to 50 MWdc.

Six wind turbines installed on the roof of the Julie Ann Wrigley Global Institute of Sustainability building on the Tempe campus have operated since October 2008. Under normal conditions, the six turbines produce enough electricity to power approximately 36 computers.

In 2021, ASU researchers installed a passive radiative cooling film to local Tempe bus shelters to cool temperatures during the daytime by radiating heat to space with zero energy use. The film was produced by 3M and cooled shelter temperatures by 4 °C. It was one of the first applications of the cooling film in the country.

ASU's School of Sustainability was the first school in the United States to introduce degrees in the field of sustainability. ASU's School of Sustainability is part of the Wrigley Global Institute of Sustainability. The School was established in spring 2007 and began enrolling undergraduates in fall 2008. The school offers majors, minors, and a number of certificates in sustainability. ASU is also home to the Sustainability Consortium, which was founded by Jay Golden in 2009.

The School of Sustainability has been essential in establishing the university as "a leader in the academics of sustainable business". The university is considered to be a principle organization for embedding sustainable practices into its operating model. The university has several sustainability goals. Among the numerous benchmarks outlined in the university's prospectus is the creation of a recycling and composting operation that will eliminate 30% and divert 90% of waste from landfills. This endeavor will be aided by educating students about the benefits of avoiding overconsumption that contributes to waste. Sustainability courses have been expanded to attain this goal and many of the university's individual colleges and schools have integrated such material into their lectures and courses. Second, ASU is on track to reduce its rate of water consumption by 50%. The university's benchmark is to be the first research university to achieve carbon neutrality as it pertains to its Scope 1, 2 and non-transportation Scope 3 greenhouse gas (GHG) emissions.

ASU's College of Integrative Sciences and Arts (CISA) offers degrees and certifications focused on sustainable horticulture, natural resource ecology, indoor farming, desert food production and wildlife management, through its College of Applied Sciences and Arts at ASU's Polytechnic campus. CISA's Burrowing Owl Conservation Project at the Polytechnic campus was noted as one of the distinctive features of ASU in The Sierra Club magazine's ranking of ASU as the top "cool school" for sustainability in 2021.

CISA faculty at the Polytechnic campus in disciplines such as applied biological sciences, and technical communication and user experience, are involved in research and community outreach to promote sustainable use of resources and preservation of species and habitat. Vertical farming, indoor farming, and water conservation efforts are just a few of the sustainability initiatives being driven by CISA faculty.

== Traditions ==
=== Maroon and gold ===
Gold is the oldest color associated with Arizona State University and dates back to 1896 when the school was named the Tempe Normal School. Maroon and white were later added to the color scheme in 1898. Gold signifies the "golden promise" of ASU. The promise includes every student receiving a valuable educational experience. Gold also signifies the sunshine Arizona is famous for; including the power of the sun and its influence on the climate and the economy. The first uniforms worn by athletes associated with the university were black and white when the "Normals" were the name of the athletic teams. The student section, known as The Inferno, wears gold on game days. Maroon signifies sacrifice and bravery while white represents the balance of negativity and positivity. As it is in the city of Tempe, Arizona, the school's colors adorn the neighboring buildings during big game days and festive events.

=== Mascot and Spirit Squad ===
Sparky the Sun Devil is the mascot of Arizona State University and was named by vote of the student body on November 8, 1946. Sparky often travels with the team across the country and has been at every football bowl game in which the university has participated. The university's mascot is not to be confused with the athletics department's logo, the Pitchfork or hand gesture used by those associated with the university. The new logo is used on various sport facilities, uniforms and athletics documents. Arizona State Teacher's College had a different mascot and the sports teams were known as the Owls and later, the Bulldogs.

When the school was first established, the Tempe Normal School's teams were simply known as the Normals. Sparky is visible on the sidelines of every home game played in Sun Devil Stadium or other ASU athletic facilities. His routine at football games includes pushups after every touchdown scored by the Sun Devils. He is aided by Sparky's Crew, male yell leaders that must meet physical requirements to participate as members. The female members are known as the Spirit Squad and are categorized into a dance line and spirit line. They are the official squad that represents ASU. The spirit squad competes every year at the ESPN Universal Dance Association (UDA) College Nationals in the Jazz and Hip-Hop categories. They were chosen by the UDA to represent the US at the World Dance Championship 2013 in the Jazz category.

=== "A" Mountain ===
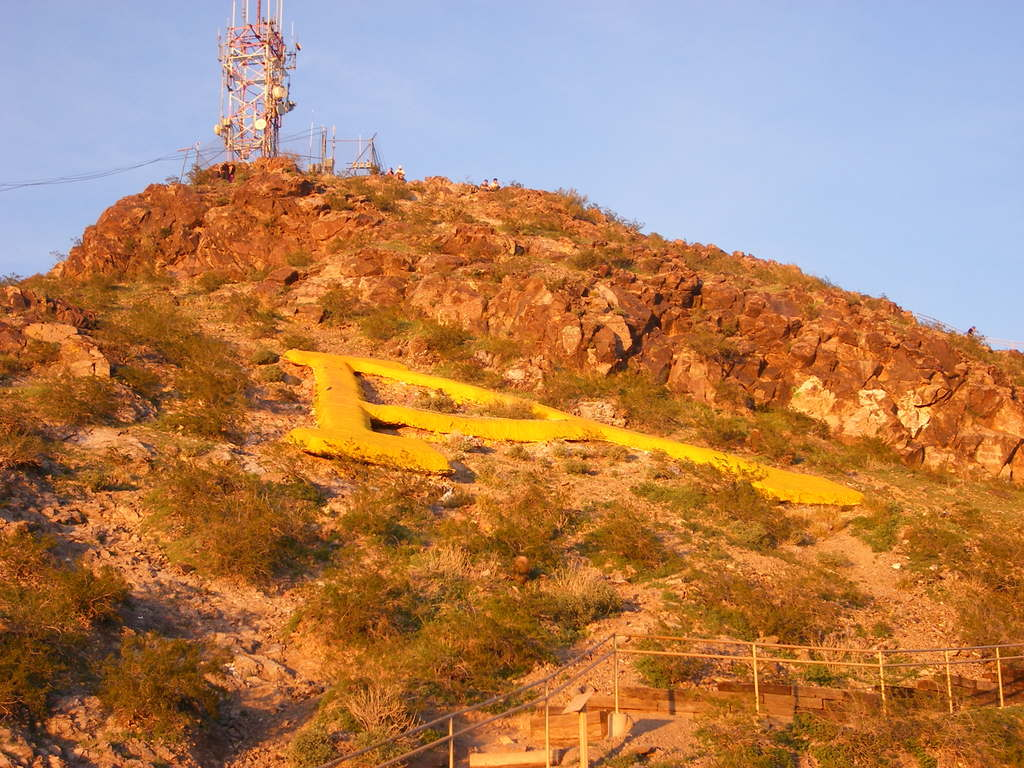
Hayden Butte, also known as "A" Mountain

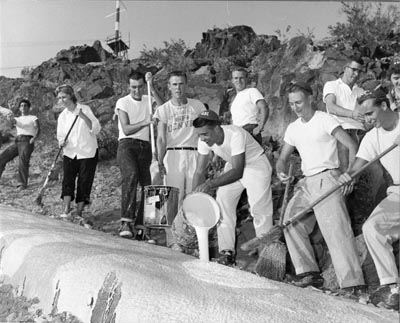
"Echo from the Buttes", the annual painting of the "A" by freshmen

A letter has existed on the slope of the mountain since 1918. A "T" followed by an "N" were the first letters to grace the landmark. Tempe Butte, home to "A" Mountain, has had the "A" installed on the slope of its south face since 1938 and is visible from campus just to the south. The original "A" was destroyed by vandals in 1952 with pipe bombs, and a new "A", constructed of reinforced concrete, was built in 1955. The vandals were never identified, but many speculate the conspirators were students from the rival in-state university (University of Arizona). Many ancient Hohokam petroglyphs were destroyed by the bomb; nevertheless, many of these archeological sites around the mountain remain. There are many traditions surrounding "A" Mountain, including a revived "guarding of the 'A'" in which students camp on the mountainside before games with rival schools. "Echo from the Buttes" is a tradition in which incoming freshmen paint the letter white during orientation week; it is repainted gold before the first football game of the season. The practice dated back to the 1930s and grew in popularity, with thousands of students going up to paint the "A" every year.

=== Lantern Walk and Homecoming ===
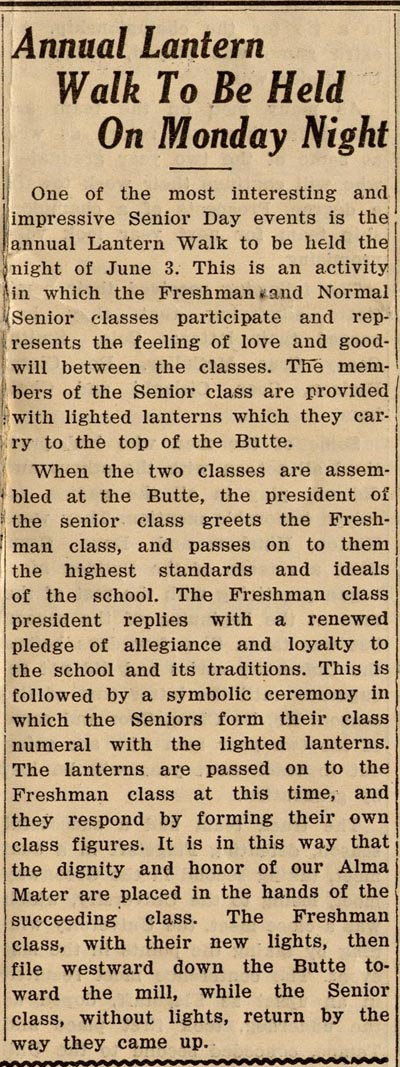
Old newspaper clipping describing the Lantern Walk tradition at ASU, May 30, 1929

The Lantern Walk is one of the oldest traditions at ASU and dates back to 1917. It is considered one of ASU's "most cherished" traditions and is an occasion used to mark the work of those associated with ASU throughout history. Anyone associated with ASU is free to participate in the event, including students, alumni, faculty, employees, and friends. This differs slightly from the original tradition in which the seniors would carry lanterns up "A" Mountain followed by the freshman. The senior class president would describe ASU's traditions and the freshman would repeat an oath of allegiance to the university. It was described as a tradition of "good will between the classes" and a way of ensuring new students would continue the university's traditions with honor. In modern times, the participants walk through campus and follow a path up to "A" Mountain to "light up" Tempe. Keynote speakers, performances, and other events are used to mark the occasion. The night is culminated with a fireworks display. The Lantern Walk was held after the Spring Semester (June) but is now held the week before Homecoming, a tradition that dates to 1924 at ASU. It is held in the fall and in conjunction with a football game.

=== Victory Bell ===
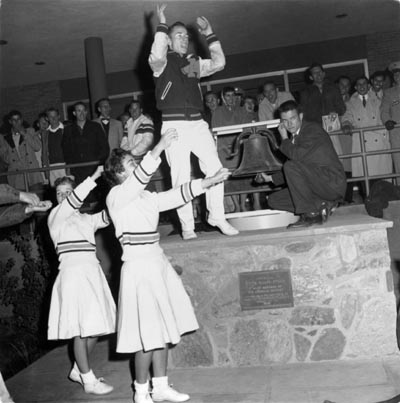
Ringing of the Victory Bell, Arizona State University c. 1956

In 2012, Arizona State University reintroduced the tradition of ringing a bell after each win for the football team. The ROTC cadets associated with the university transport the bell to various events and ring it after Sun Devil victories. The first Victory Bell, in various forms, was used in the 1930s but the tradition faded in the 1970s when the bell was removed from Memorial Union for renovations. The bell cracked and was no longer capable of ringing. That bell is on the southeast corner of Sun Devil Stadium, near the entrance to the student section. That bell, given to the university in the late 1960s, is painted gold and is a campus landmark.

=== Sun Devil Marching Band, Devil Walk and songs of the university ===
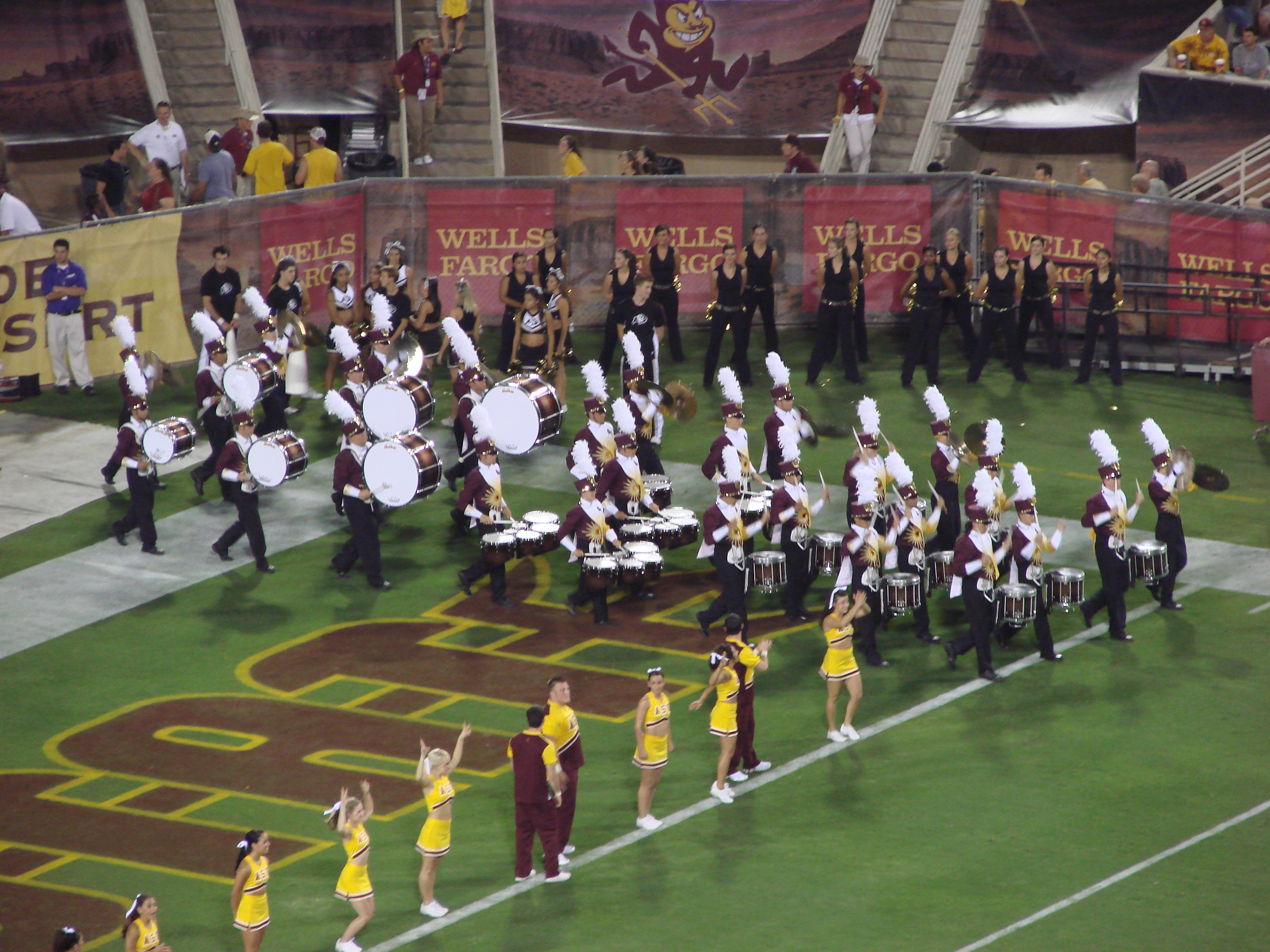
Sun Devil Marching Band Battery, performing the pregame drum cadence in 2007

The Arizona State University Sun Devil Marching Band, created in 1915 and known as the "Pride of the Southwest", was the first of only two marching bands in the Pac-12 to receive the prestigious Sudler Trophy. The John Philip Sousa Foundation awarded the band the trophy in 1991. The Sun Devil Marching Band remains one of only 28 bands in the nation to have earned the designation. The band performs at every football game played in Sun Devil Stadium. In addition, the Sun Devil Marching Band has made appearances in the Fiesta Bowl, the Rose Bowl, the Holiday Bowl, and the Super Bowl XLII, in addition to many others.

Smaller ensembles of band members perform at other sport venues including basketball games at Wells Fargo Arena and baseball games. The Devil Walk is held in Wells Fargo Arena by the football team and involves a more formal introduction of the players to the community; a new approach to the tradition added in 2012 with the arrival of head coach Todd Graham. It begins 2 hours and 15 minutes prior to the game and allows the players to establish rapport with the fans. The walk ends as the team passes the band and fans lined along the path to Sun Devil Stadium. The walk was discontinued when Graham was fired. However, in 2022, interim coach Shaun Aguano announced that the Sun Devil Walk is returning. The most recognizable songs played by the band are "Alma Mater" and ASU's fight songs titled "Maroon and Gold" and the "Al Davis Fight Song". "Alma Mater" was composed by former Music Professor and Director of Sun Devil Marching Band (then known as Bulldog Marching Band), Miles A. Dresskell, in 1937. "Maroon and Gold" was authored by former Director of Sun Devil Marching Band, Felix E. McKernan, in 1948. The "Al Davis Fight Song" (also known as "Go, Go Sun Devils" and "Arizona State University Fight Song") was composed by ASU alumnus Albert Oliver Davis in the 1940s without any lyrics. Recently lyrics were added to the song.

=== Curtain of Distraction ===
The Curtain of Distraction is a tradition that appears at every men's and women's basketball game. The tradition started in 2013 in order to get fans to the games. In the second half of basketball games, a portable "curtain" opens up in front of the opponents shooting a free throw and students pop out of the curtain to try to distract the opponent. Some of the skits include an Elvis impersonator, people rubbing mayonnaise on their chest, and people wearing unicorn heads. In 2016, former Olympian Michael Phelps came out of the curtain wearing a Speedo during a game against Oregon State. ESPN estimated that distraction may give ASU a one-to-three point advantage.

== Student life ==
Student demographics as of Fall 2024
Race and ethnicity	Total
White	43%
Hispanic	23%
International student	9%
Asian	7%
Black	6%
Unknown	6%
Two or more races	5%
American Indian and Alaska Native	1%
Economic diversity
Low-income (Note: The percentage of students who received an income-based federal Pell grant intended for low-income students.)	31%
Affluent (Note: The percentage of students who are a part of the American middle class at the bare minimum.)	69%

=== Extracurricular programs ===
Arizona State University has an active extracurricular involvement program. Located on the second floor of the Student Pavilion at the Tempe campus, Educational Outreach and Student Services (EOSS) provides opportunities for student involvement through clubs, sororities, fraternities, community service, leadership, student government, and co-curricular programming.

The oldest student organization on campus is Devils' Advocates, the volunteer campus tour guide organization, which was founded in 1966 as a way to more competitively recruit National Merit Scholars. There are over 1,100 ASU alumni who can call themselves Advos.

Changemaker Central is a student-run centralized resource hub for student involvement in social entrepreneurship, civic engagement, service-learning, and community service that catalyzes student-driven social change. Changemaker Central locations have opened on all campuses in fall 2011, providing flexible, creative workspaces for everyone in the ASU community. The project is entirely student run and advances ASU's institutional commitments to social embeddedness and entrepreneurship. The space allows students to meet, work and join new networks and collaborative enterprises while taking advantage of ASU's many resources and opportunities for engagement. Changemaker Central has signature programs, including Changemaker Challenge, that support students in their journey to become changemakers by creating communities of support around new solutions/ideas and increasing access to early stage seed funding. The Changemaker Challenge seeks undergraduate and graduate students from across the university who are dedicated to making a difference in our local and global communities through innovation. Students can win up to $10,000 to make their innovative project, prototype, venture or community partnership ideas happen.

In addition to Changemaker Central, the Greek community (Greek Life) at Arizona State University has been important in binding students to the university, and providing social outlets. ASU is also home to one of the nation's first and fastest growing gay fraternities, Sigma Phi Beta, founded in 2003; considered a sign of the growing university's commitment to supporting diversity and inclusion.

The second Eta chapter of Phrateres, a non-exclusive, non-profit social-service club, was installed here in 1958 and became inactive in the 1990s.

There are multiple councils for Greek Life, including the Interfraternity Council (IFC), Multicultural Greek Council (MGC), National Association of Latino Fraternal Organizations (NALFO), National Pan-Hellenic Council (NPHC), Panhellenic Association (PHA), and the Professional Fraternity Council (PFC).

=== Student media ===
The State Press is the university's independent, student-operated news publication. The State Press covers news and events on all four ASU campuses. Student editors and managers are solely responsible for the content of the State Press website. These publications are overseen by an independent board and guided by a professional adviser employed by the university.

The Downtown Devil is a student-run news publication website for the Downtown Phoenix Campus, produced by students at the Walter Cronkite School of Journalism and Mass Communication.

ASU has one student-run radio station, Blaze Radio. Blaze Radio is a completely student-run broadcast station owned and funded by the Cronkite School of Journalism. The station broadcasts using a 24-hour online stream on their official website. Blaze Radio plays music 24 hours a day and features daily student-hosted news, music, and sports specialty programs.

=== Student government ===
Associated Students of Arizona State University (ASASU) is the student government at Arizona State University. It is composed of the Undergraduate Student Government and the Graduate & Professional Student Association (GPSA). Each ASU campus has a specific USG; USG Tempe (Tempe), USGD (Downtown), USG Polytechnic (Polytechnic) and USG West (West). Members and officers of ASASU are elected annually by the student body.

The Residence Hall Association (RHA) of Arizona State University is the student government for every ASU student living on-campus. Each ASU campus has an RHA that operates independently. RHA's purpose is to improve the quality of residence hall life and provide a cohesive voice for the residents by addressing the concerns of the on-campus populations to university administrators and other campus organizations; providing cultural, diversity, educational, and social programming; establishing and working with individual community councils.

== Athletics ==
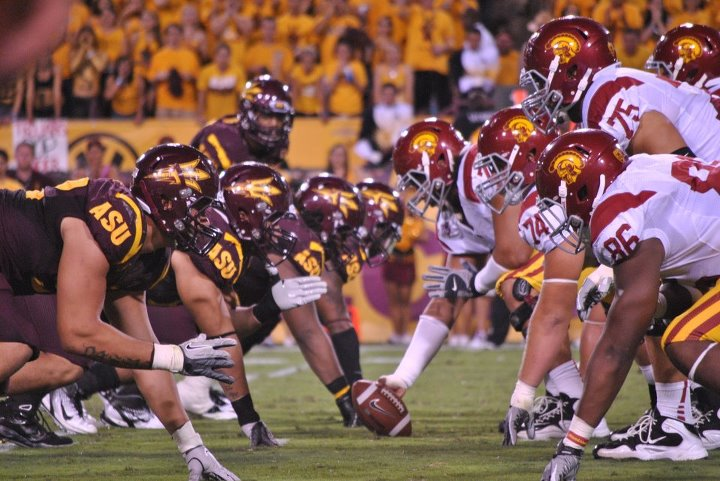
Arizona State Football Team in September 2011

Arizona State University's Division I athletic teams are called the Sun Devils, which is also the nickname used to refer to students and alumni of the university. They compete in the Big 12 Conference in 20 varsity sports. Historically, the university has highly performed in men's, women's, and mixed archery; men's, women's, and mixed badminton; women's golf; women's swimming and diving; baseball; and football. Arizona State University's NCAA Division I-A program competes in 9 varsity sports for men and 11 for women. ASU's athletic director is Ray Anderson, former executive vice president of football operations for the National Football League. Anderson replaced Steve Patterson, who was appointed to the position in 2012, replacing Lisa Love, the former Senior Associate Athletic Director at the University of Southern California. Love was responsible for the hiring of coaches Herb Sendek, the men's basketball coach, and Dennis Erickson, the men's football coach. Erickson was fired in 2011 and replaced by Todd Graham. In December 2017, ASU announced that Herm Edwards would replace Graham as the head football coach. The rival to Arizona State University is University of Arizona.

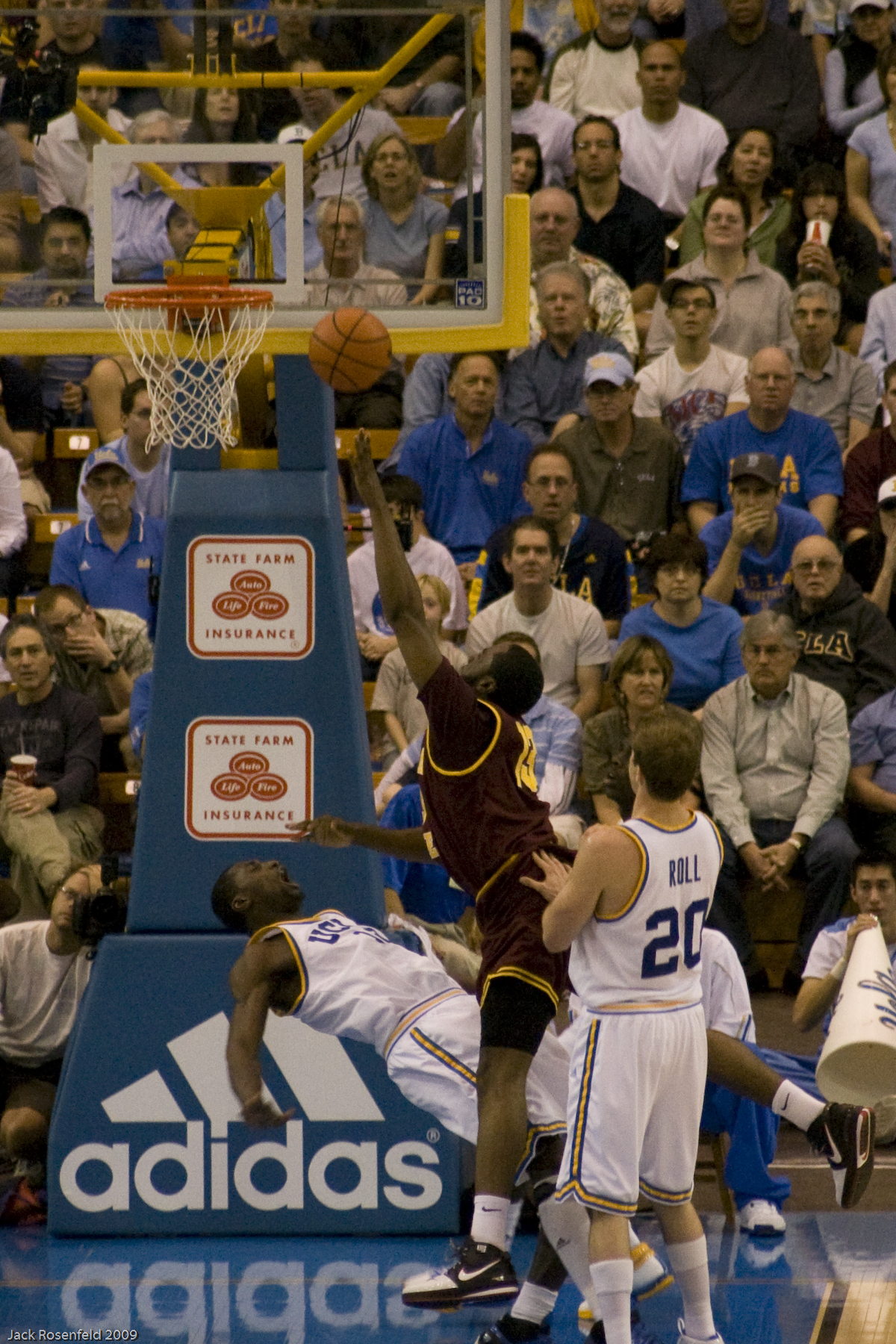
James Harden, ASU Basketball

ASU has won 24 national collegiate team championships in the following sports: baseball (5), men's golf (2), women's golf (8), men's gymnastics (1), softball (2), men's indoor track (1), women's indoor track (2), men's outdoor track (1), women's outdoor track (1), and wrestling (1).

In September 2009, criticism over the seven-figure salaries earned by various coaches at Arizona's public universities (including ASU) prompted the Arizona Board of Regents to re-evaluate the salary and benefit policy for athletic staff. With the 2011 expansion of the Pac-12 Conference, a new $3 billion contract for revenue sharing among all the schools in the conference was established. With the infusion of funds, the salary issue and various athletic department budgeting issues at ASU were addressed. The Pac-12's new media contract with ESPN allowed ASU to hire a new coach in 2012. A new salary and bonus package (maximum bonus of $2.05 million) was instituted and is one of the most lucrative in the conference. ASU also plans to expand its athletic facilities with a public-private investment strategy to create an amateur sports district that can accommodate the Pan American Games and operate as an Olympic Training Center. The athletic district will include a $300 million renovation of Sun Devil Stadium that will include new football facilities. The press box and football offices in Sun Devil Stadium were remodeled in 2012.

Arizona State Sun Devils football was founded in 1896 under coach Fred Irish. The team has played in the 2012 Fight Hunger Bowl, the 2011 Las Vegas bowl, the 2016 Cactus Bowl, and the 2007 Holiday Bowl. The Sun Devils played in the 1997 Rose Bowl and won the Rose Bowl in 1987. The team has appeared in the Fiesta Bowl in 1983, 1977, 1975, 1973, 1972, and 1971 winning 5 of 6. In 1970, and 1975, they were champions of the NCAA Division I FBS National Football Championship. The Sun Devils were Pac-12 Champions in 1986, 1996, and 2007. Altogether, the football team has 17 Conference Championships and has participated in a total of 29 bowl games as of the 2015–2016 season with a 14–14–1 record in those games.

ASU Sun Devils Hockey competed with NCAA Division 1 schools for the first time in 2012, largely due to the success of the program. In 2016, they began as a full-time Division I team.

Eight members of ASU's Women's Swimming and Diving Team were selected to the Pac-10 All-Academic Team on April 5, 2010. In addition, five member of ASU's Men's Swimming and Diving Team were selected to the Pac-10 All-Academic Team on April 6, 2010.

In April 2015, Bobby Hurley was hired as the men's basketball coach, replacing Herb Sendek. Previously, Hurley was the head coach at the University at Buffalo for the UB Bulls as well as an assistant coach at Rhode Island and Wagner University.

In 2015, Bob Bowman was hired as the head swim coach. Previously, Bowman trained Michael Phelps through his Olympic career.

As of Fall 2015, ASU students, including those enrolled in online courses, may avail of a free ticket to all ASU athletic events upon presentation of a valid student ID and reserving one online through their ASU and Ticketmaster account. Tickets may be limited or not available in the 2020–2021 and 2021–2022 school years due to the COVID-19 pandemic.

== Notable alumni ==
As of 2024, the Arizona State University Alumni Association has more than 640,000 members worldwide, 338,000 of whom live in Arizona. It is headquartered in Old Main on the Tempe campus. Prominent alumni in government and politics include three U.S. senators (Carl Hayden, Roger Jepsen and Kyrsten Sinema) and four governors of Arizona (Evan Mecham, Jane Dee Hull, Doug Ducey and Katie Hobbs), as well as ten U.S. representatives; former U.S. ambassador and Secretary of the Air Force Barbara Barrett; and three presidents of the Navajo Nation (Peterson Zah, Albert Hale and Joe Shirley Jr.). In business, alumni include Ira A. Fulton, founder of Fulton Homes and namesake of ASU's Ira A. Fulton Schools of Engineering; Kate Spade, namesake and cofounder of Kate Spade New York; and Kevin Warren, president of the Chicago Bears and former commissioner of the Big Ten Conference. Academics include Harriet Nembhard, Dean T. Kashiwagi, and Eduardo Obregón Pagán.

In entertainment, prominent ASU alumni include figures like Steve Allen, Jimmy Kimmel, sportscaster Al Michaels, and comedian and actor David Spade. Influential writers and novelists include Amanda Brown, author of Legally Blonde; academic and animal scientist Temple Grandin; and conservative author, commentator and popular historian Larry Schweikart, author of A Patriot's History of the United States.

Six ASU alumni are enshrined in the Pro Football Hall of Fame: Eric Allen, Curley Culp, Mike Haynes, John Henry Johnson, Randall McDaniel and Charley Taylor. Silver Star recipient Pat Tillman, who played football at ASU from 1994 to 1997, left his National Football League career to enlist in the United States Army in the aftermath of the September 11 attacks. As of 2024, ASU is second among all NCAA universities with 117 alumni who have played in Major League Baseball and has the most inductees into the College Baseball Hall of Fame, with notable players including Barry Bonds, Reggie Jackson, Ian Kinsler and Dustin Pedroia. Thirty Sun Devils have played in the National Basketball Association, including Joe Caldwell, Ike Diogu, Lionel Hollins, James Harden, Eddie House, Fat Lever, Alton Lister and Byron Scott. Joey Daccord was the first ASU alumnus to play in the National Hockey League, while ASU has produced professional women's soccer players including Liz Bogus, Alexia Delgado and Jemma Purfield.

ASU alumni golfers include major tournament winners Phil Mickelson and Jon Rahm. Wrestlers and mixed martial arts fighters include Zeke Jones, Anthony Robles and Cain Velasquez. More than 200 Sun Devil student-athletes have competed in the Olympic Games as of 2024, winning a total of 66 medals; notable Olympians from ASU include Melissa Belote, Herman Frazier, Ron Freeman, Jan Henne and Léon Marchand.

Selected alumni of Arizona State University

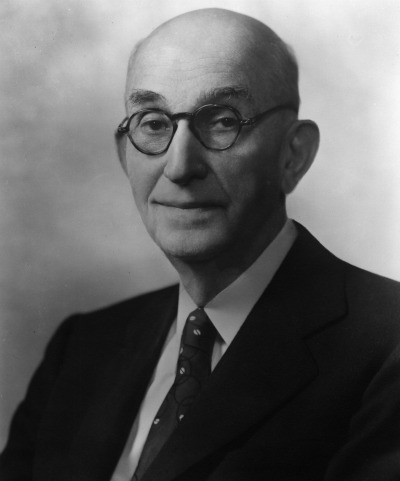
U.S. Senator Carl Hayden (1896)

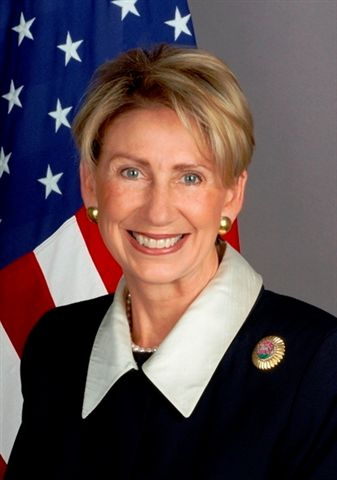
Barbara Barrett (BS 1972, MPA 1975, JD 1978)

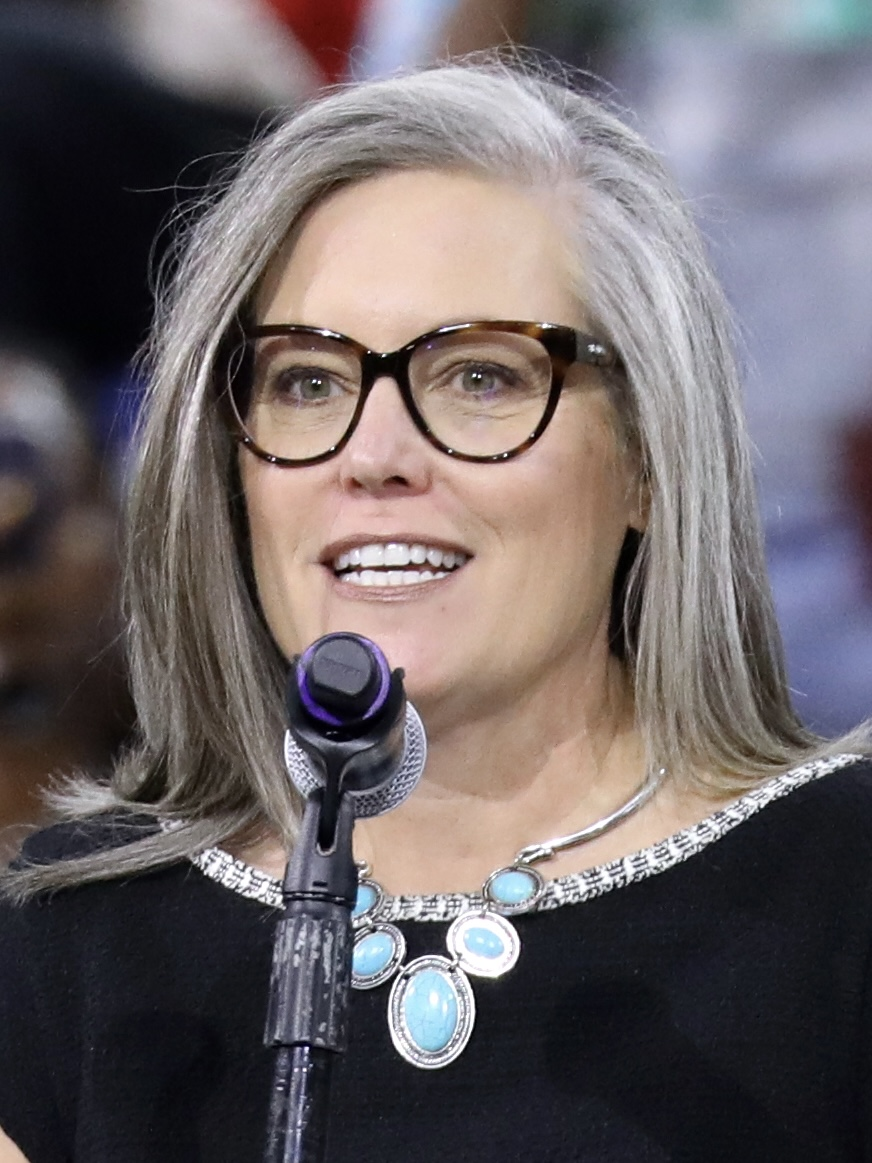
Governor of Arizona Katie Hobbs (MSW)

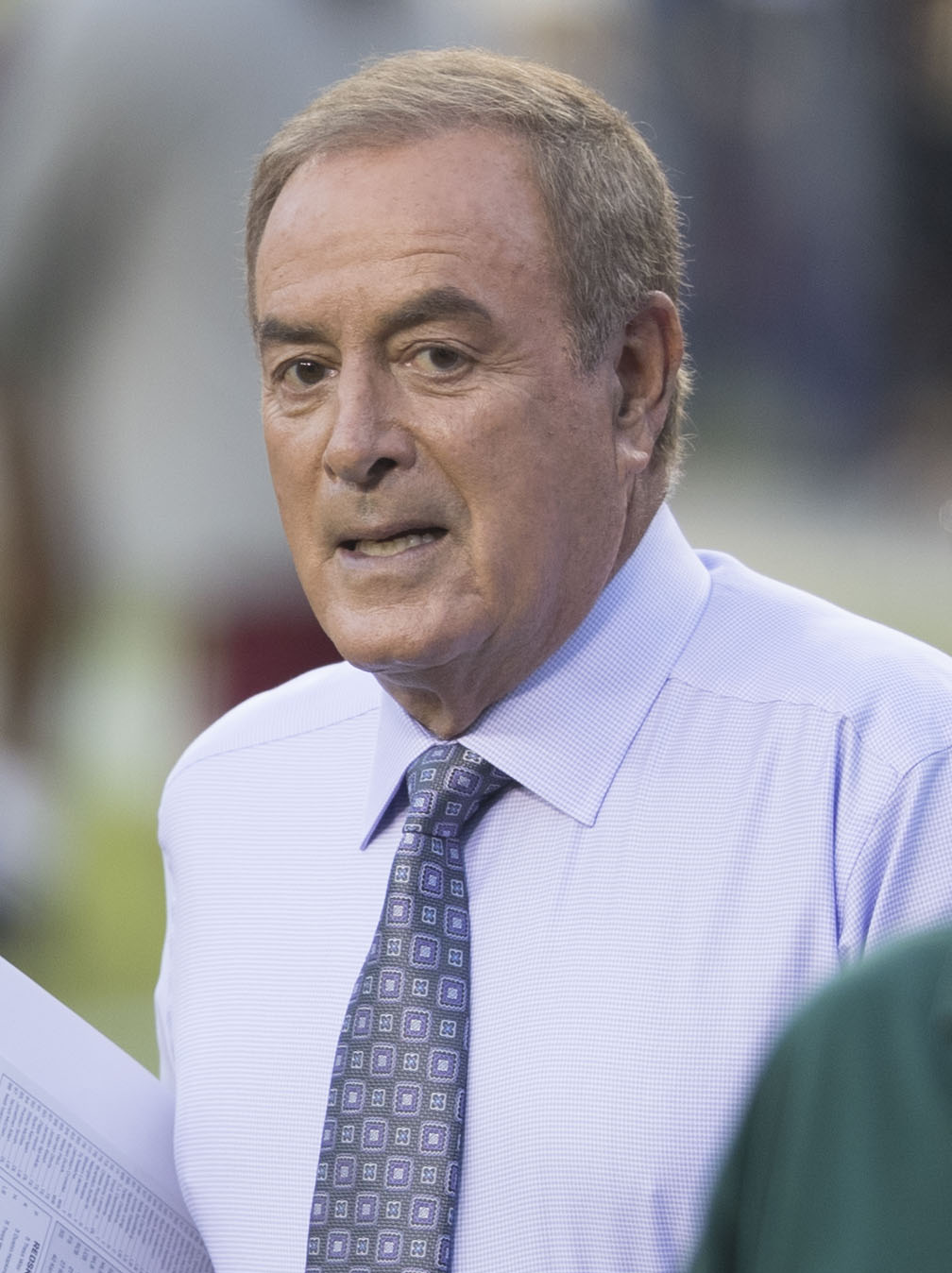
Sportscaster Al Michaels (BA 1966)

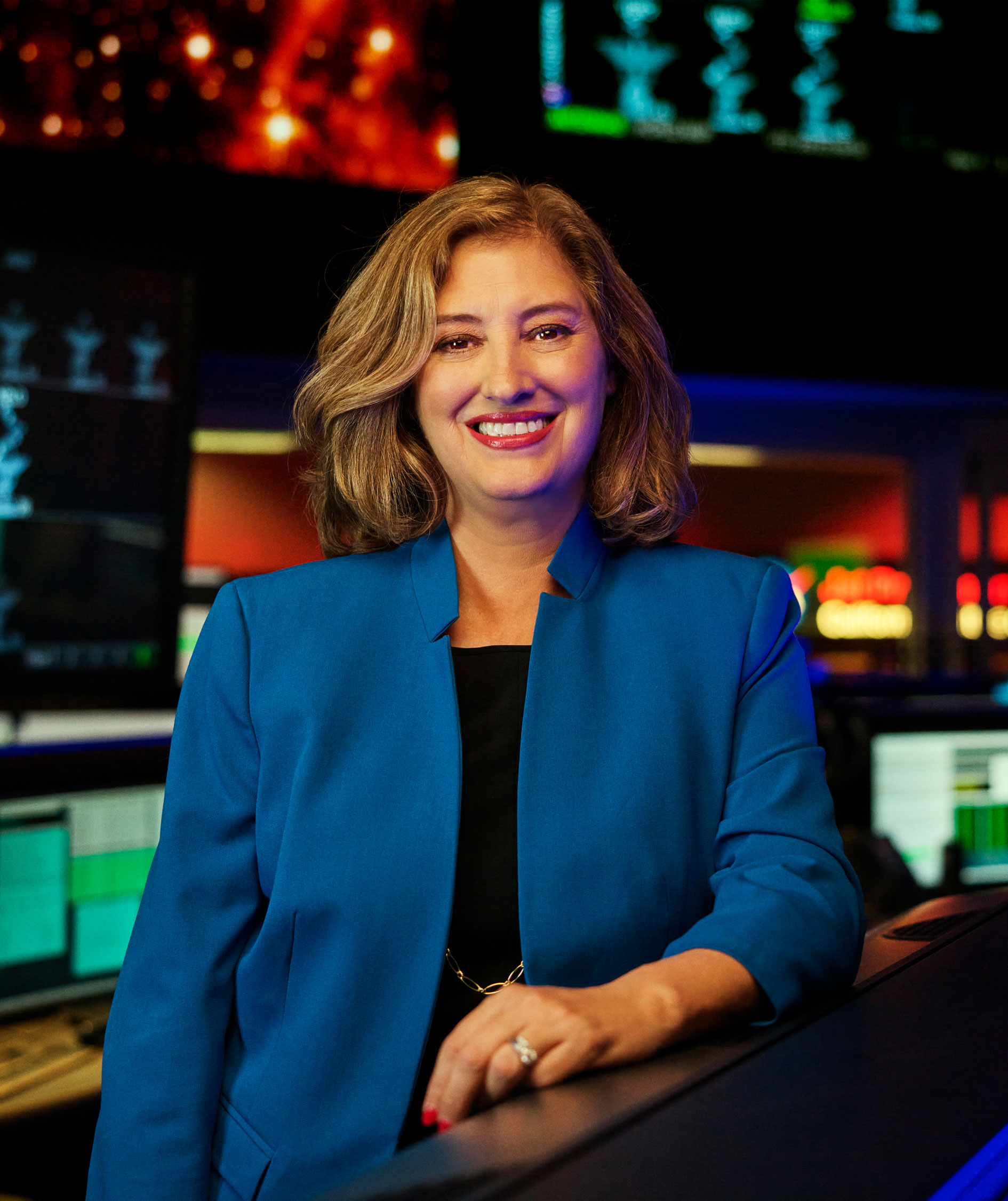
Scientist Laurie Leshin (BS 1987)

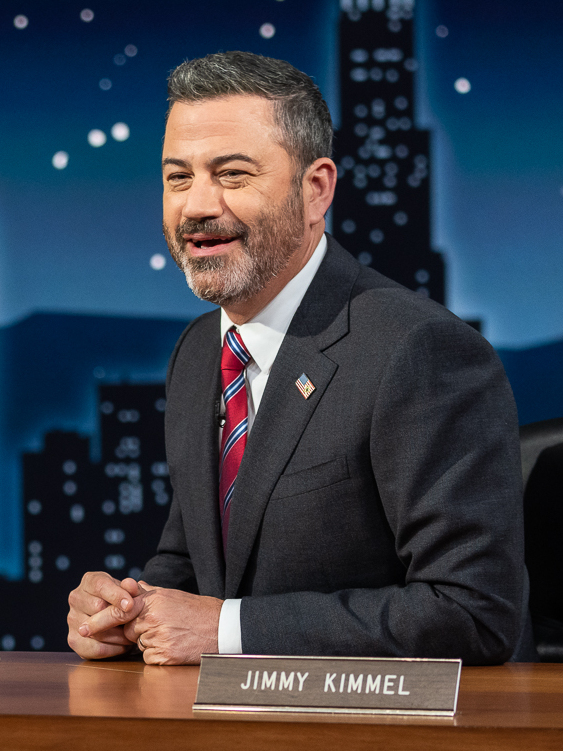
Jimmy Kimmel

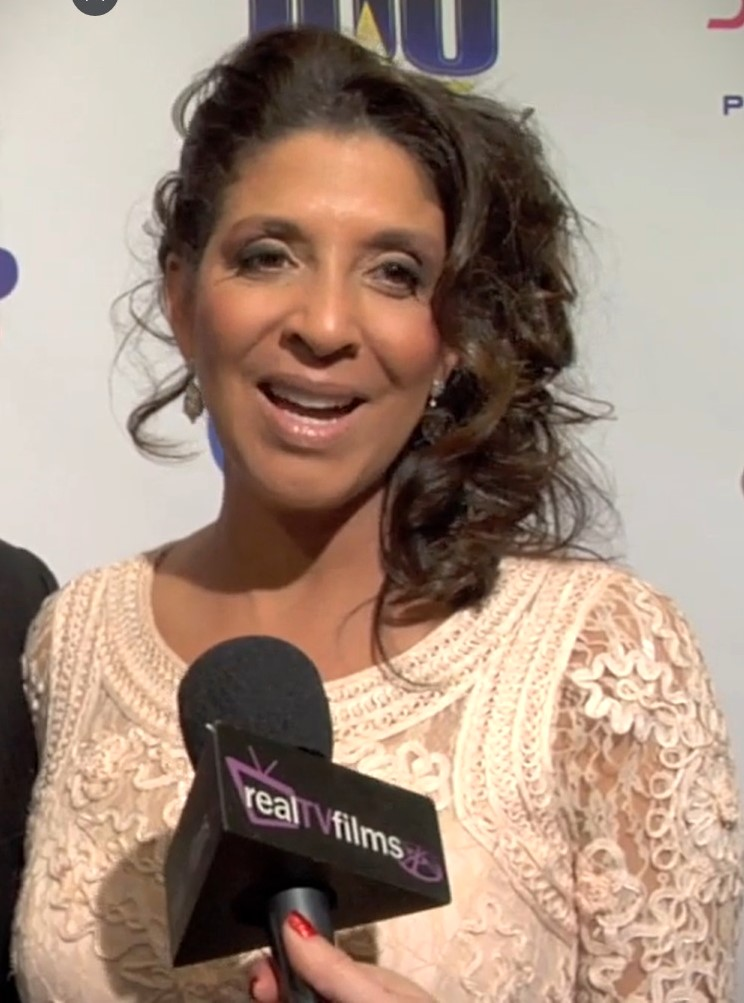
Christine Devine (BA 1987)

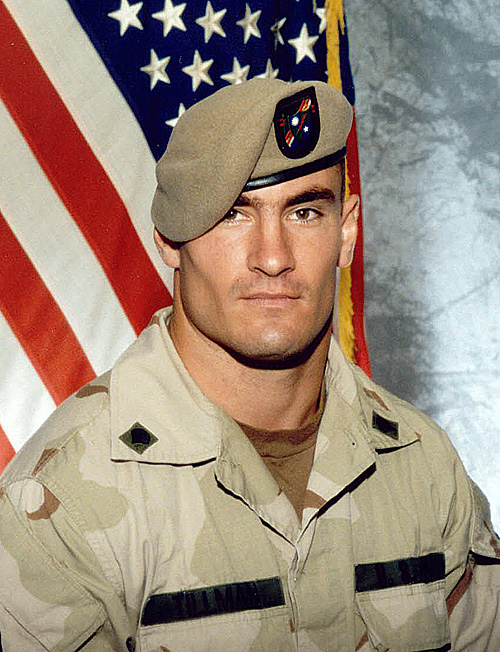
Pat Tillman (BS 1997)

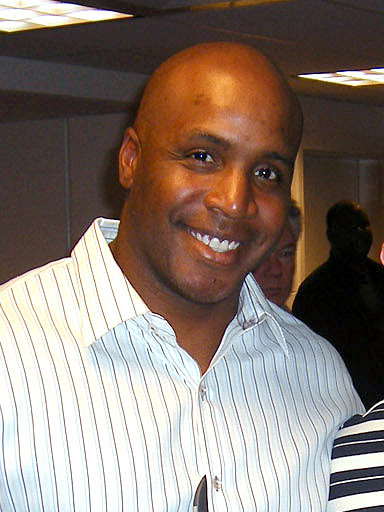
Barry Bonds

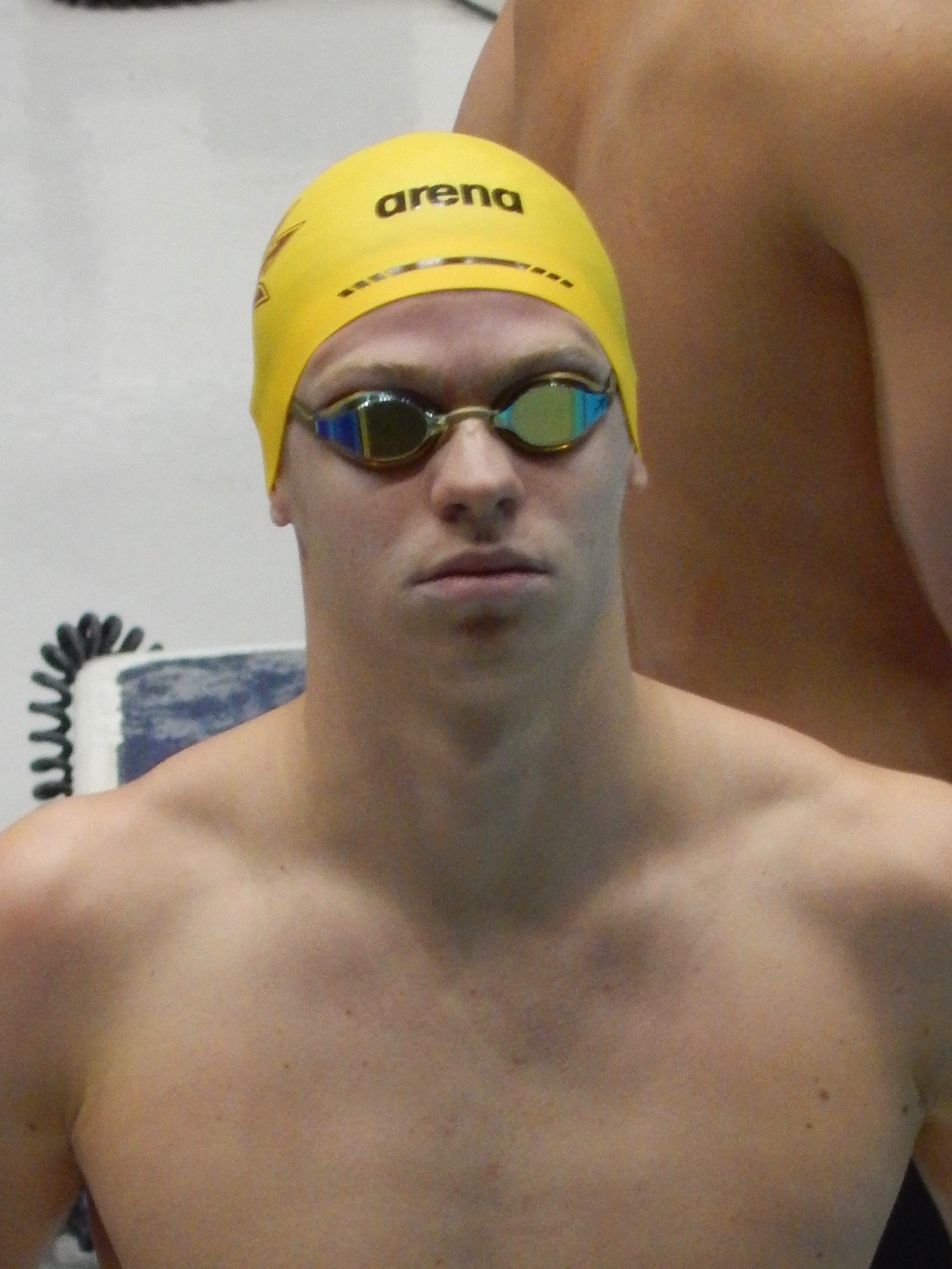
Léon Marchand

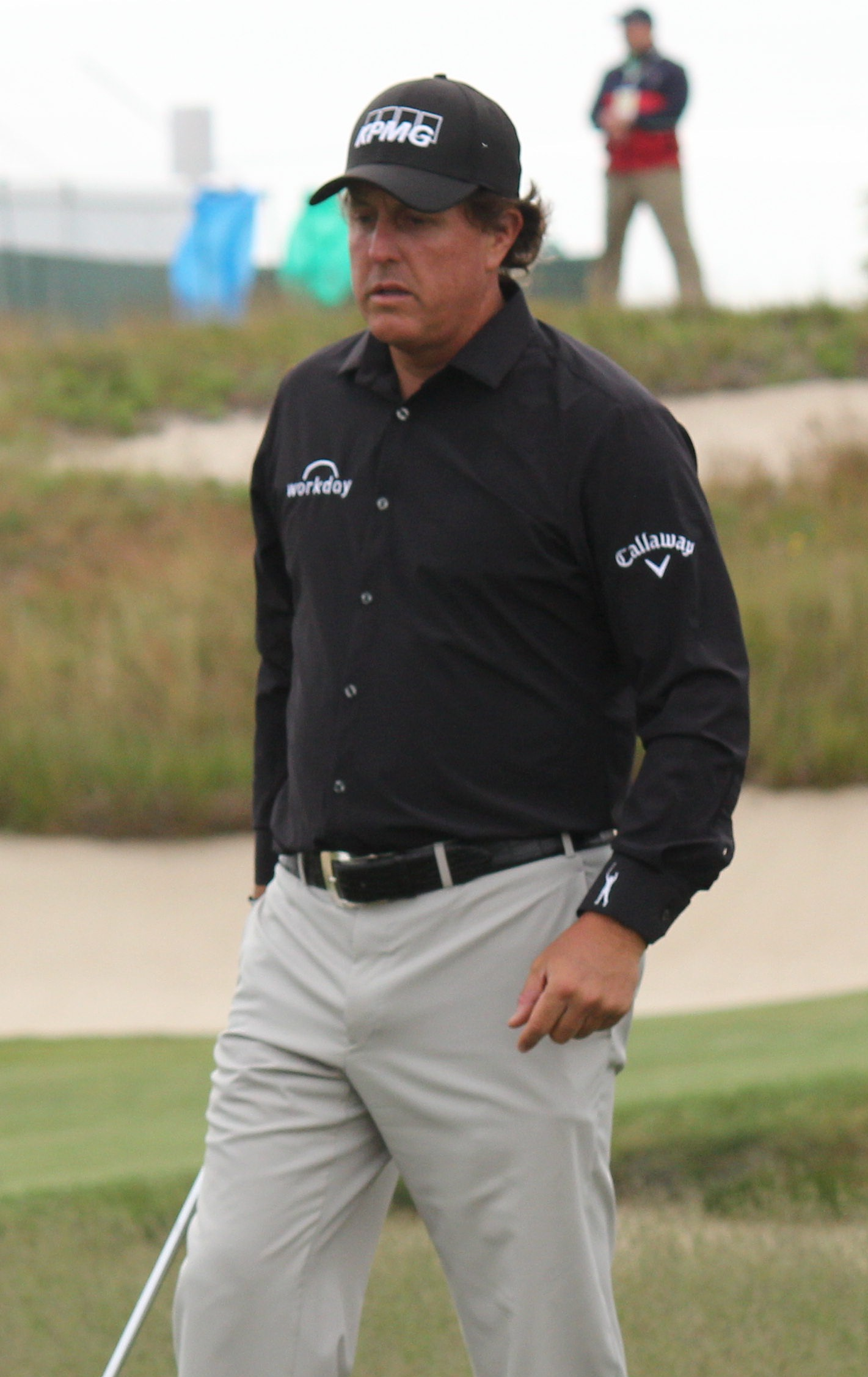
Phil Mickelson (BA 1992)

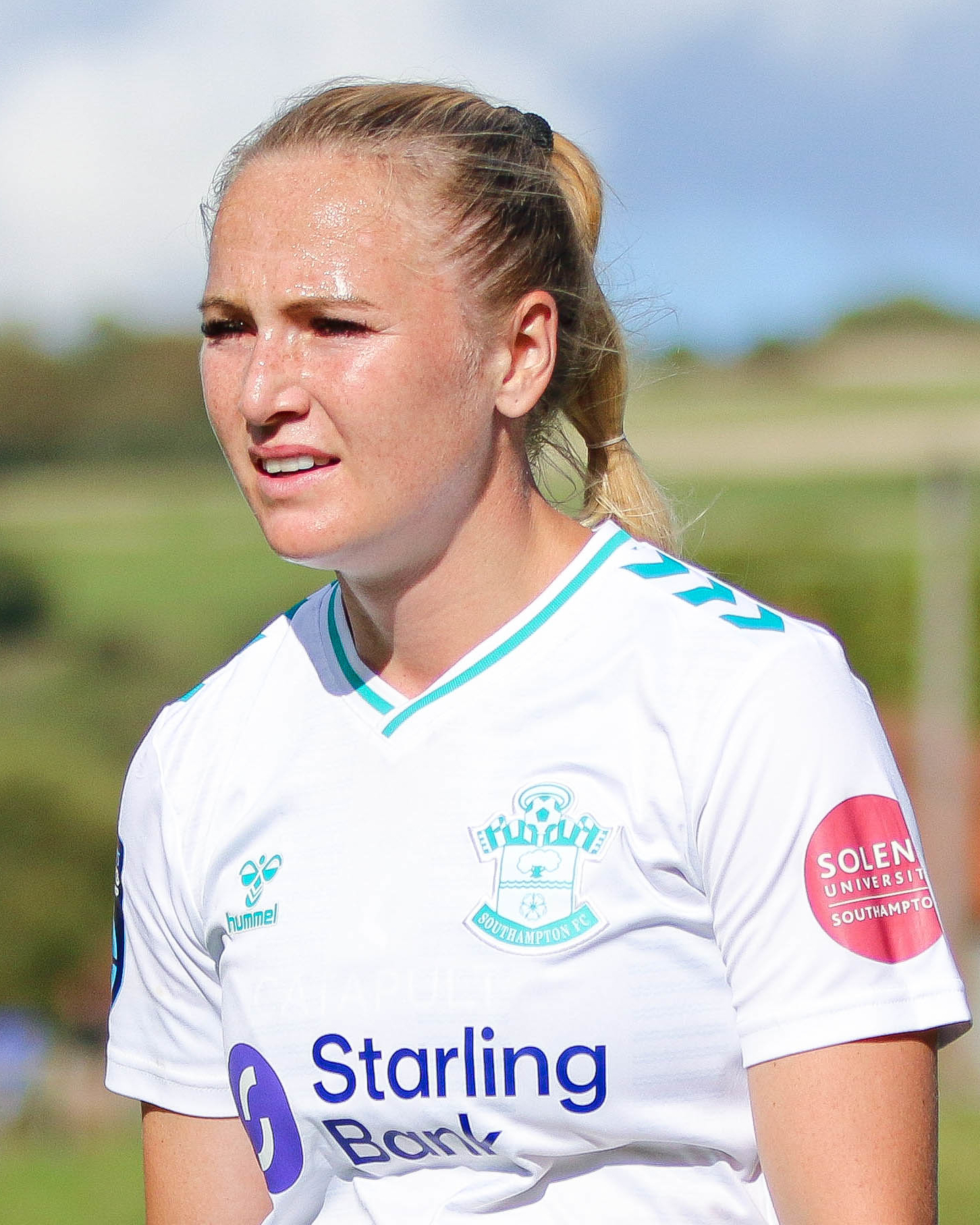
Jemma Purfield

== Notable faculty ==
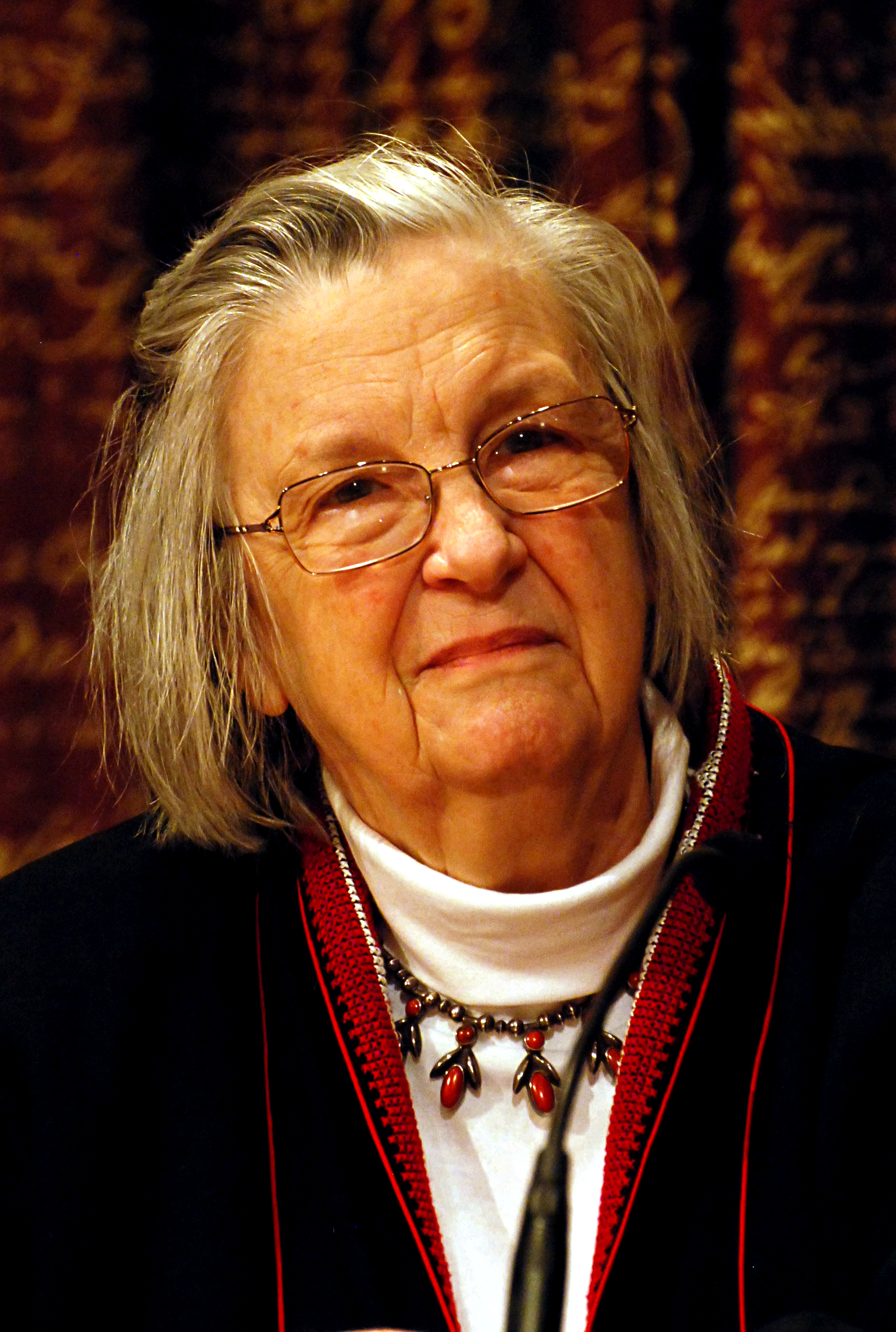
Elinor Ostrom

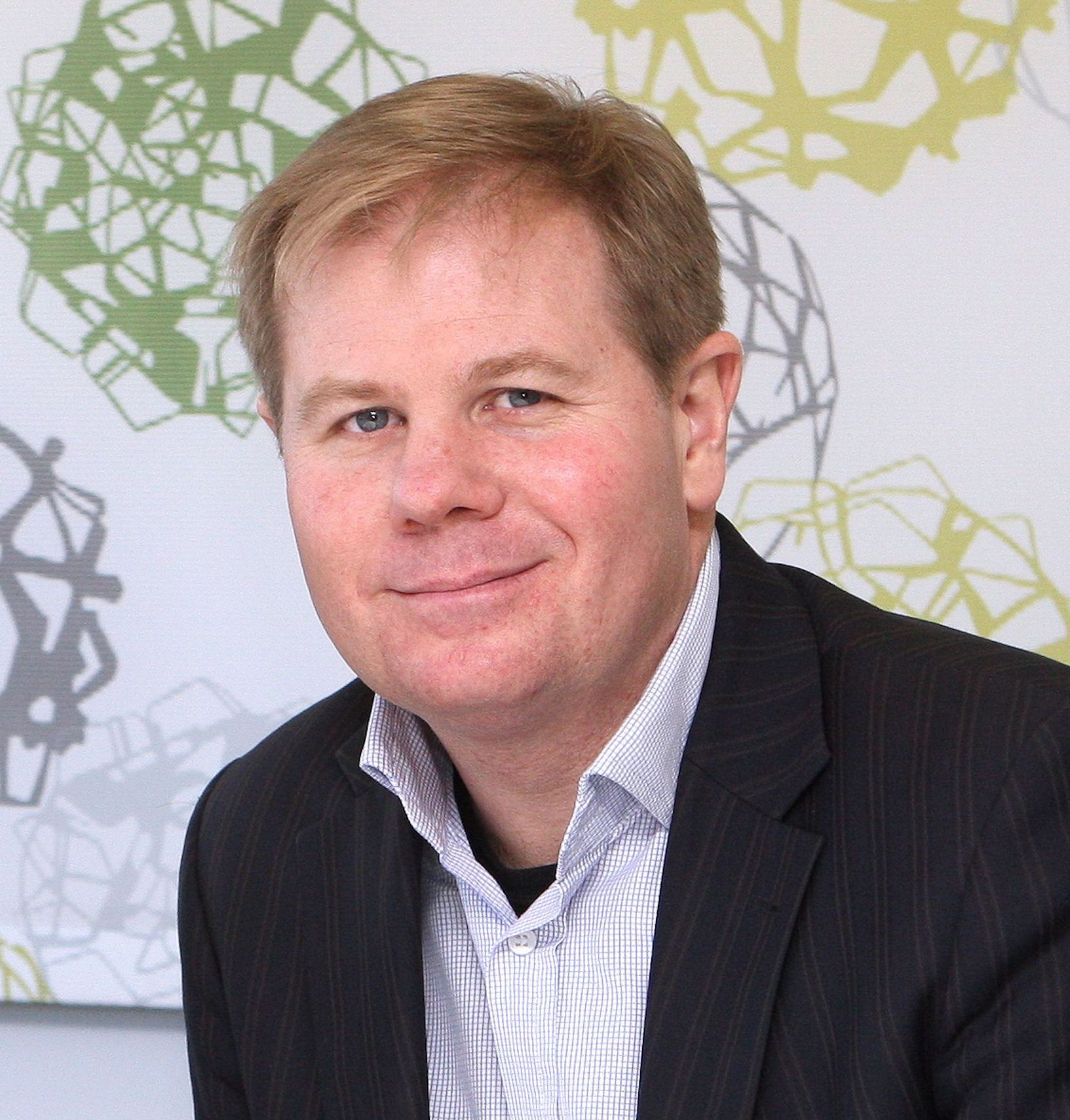
David Kilcullen

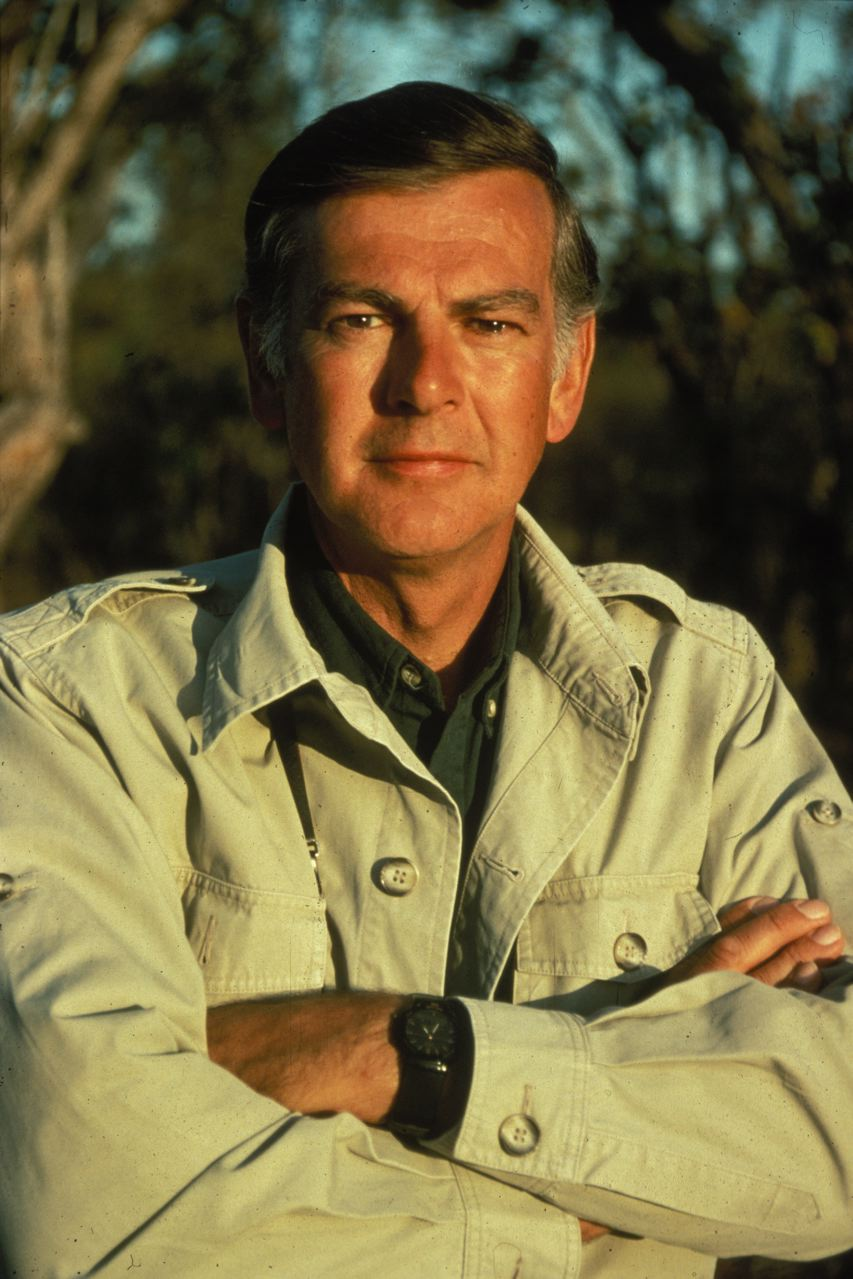
Donald Johanson

ASU faculty have included former CNN host Aaron Brown, Academic Claude Olney, meta-analysis developer Gene V. Glass, feminist and author Gloria Feldt, physicist Paul Davies, and Pulitzer Prize winner and The Ants coauthor Bert Hölldobler. David Kilcullen, a counterinsurgency theorist, is a professor of practice. Donald Johanson, who discovered the 3.18 million year old fossil hominid Lucy (Australopithecus) in Ethiopia, is also a professor, as well as George Poste, Chief Scientist for the Complex Adaptive Systems Initiative. Former US senator Jeff Flake was appointed as a distinguished dean fellow on December 2, 2020. Nobel laureate faculty include Leland Hartwell, and Edward C. Prescott. On June 12, 2012, Elinor Ostrom, ASU's third Nobel laureate, died at the age of 78.

ASU faculty's achievements as of 2020 include:

- 6 Nobel laureates
- 3 members of the Royal Society
- 24 National Academy members
- 7 Pulitzer Prize winners
- 5 Sloan Research Fellows
- 37 Guggenheim Fellows
- 250 Fulbright American Scholars
- 5 MacArthur Fellow
- 23 members of the American Academy of Arts and Sciences
- 9 members of the National Academy of Engineering
- 143 National Endowment for the Humanities fellows
- 65 American Association for the Advancement of Science Fellows
- 2 members of the Institute of Medicine
- 8 Presidential Early Career Awards for Scientists and Engineers
- 8 American Council of Learned Societies Fellows
- 34 IEEE Fellows
- 19 Alexander Von Humboldt Foundation Prize Winners
- 1 Recipient of the Rockefeller Fellowship

== Presidents ==
The following persons served as president of Arizona State University:

Principals and presidents of Arizona State University
No.	Portrait	President	Term start	Term end	Refs.
Principals of the Territorial Normal School (1885–1889)
1		Hiram Bradford Farmer	1886	1888	
2		Robert Lindley Long	1888	1890	
Principals of the Tempe Normal School of Arizona (1889–1904)
3		Dayton Alonzo Reed	1890	1892	
4		Edgar L. Storment	1892	1895	
5		James McNaughton	1895	1899	
6		Joseph Warren Smith	1899	1900	
7		Arthur John Matthews	1900	1904	
Presidents of the Tempe Normal School (1904–1925)
7		Arthur John Matthews	1904	1930	
Presidents of Arizona State Teachers College (1929–1945)
8		Ralph Waldo Swetman	1930	1933	
Presidents of Arizona State College (1945–1958)
9		Grady Gammage	1933	1959	
Presidents of Arizona State University (1958–present)
10 (Note: Acting president)		Harold D. Richardson	1959	1960	
11		G. Homer Durham	1960	1969	
acting		Harry K. Newburn	1969	1970	
12		Harry K. Newburn	1970	1971	
13		John W. Schwada	1971	June 30, 1981	
14		J. Russell Nelson	July 1, 1981	June 30, 1989	
interim		Richard E. Peck	July 1, 1989	December 31, 1990	
15		Lattie F. Coor	January 1, 1990	June 30, 2002	
16		Michael M. Crow	July 1, 2002	present	

Table notes:

== Presidential visits ==
Arizona State University has been visited by ten United States presidents. President Theodore Roosevelt was the first president to visit campus, speaking on the steps of Old Main on March 20, 1911, while in Arizona to dedicate the Roosevelt Dam. President Richard Nixon did not visit ASU as president, but visited Phoenix as president on October 31, 1970, at an event that included a performance by the Arizona State University Band, which President Nixon acknowledged. As part of President Nixon's remarks, he stated that, "when I am in Arizona, Arizona State is number one." President Lyndon B. Johnson spoke at ASU's Grady Gammage Memorial Auditorium on January 29, 1972, at a memorial service for ASU alumnus Senator Carl T. Hayden. Future president Gerald R. Ford debated Senator Albert Gore, Sr. at Grady Gammage Memorial Auditorium on April 28, 1968, and Ford returned to the same building as a former president to give a lecture on February 24, 1984. President Jimmy Carter visited Arizona PBS at ASU's Walter Cronkite School of Journalism and Mass Communication on July 31, 2015, to promote a memoir. Future president Ronald Reagan gave a political speech at the school's Memorial Union in 1957, and returned to campus as a former president on March 20, 1989, delivering his first ever post-presidential speech at ASU's Wells Fargo Arena. President George H. W. Bush gave a lecture at Wells Fargo Arena on May 5, 1998.

President Bill Clinton became the first sitting president to visit ASU on October 31, 1996, speaking on the Grady Gammage Memorial Auditorium lawn. He returned to ASU in 2006, and in 2014, President Clinton, Hillary Clinton, and Chelsea Clinton came to campus to host the Clinton Global Initiative University. President George W. Bush became the second sitting president to visit the school's campus when he debated Senator John Kerry at the university's Grady Gammage Memorial Auditorium on October 13, 2004. President Barack Obama visited ASU as sitting president on May 13, 2009. President Obama delivered the commencement speech for the Spring 2009 Commencement Ceremony. President Obama had previously visited the school as a United States senator. President Donald Trump spoke at a campaign rally in Mullett Arena on October 24, 2024.

== See also ==
- KAET (channel 8), a PBS member station owned by Arizona State University
