= New College of Interdisciplinary Arts and Sciences =

College of Arizona State University

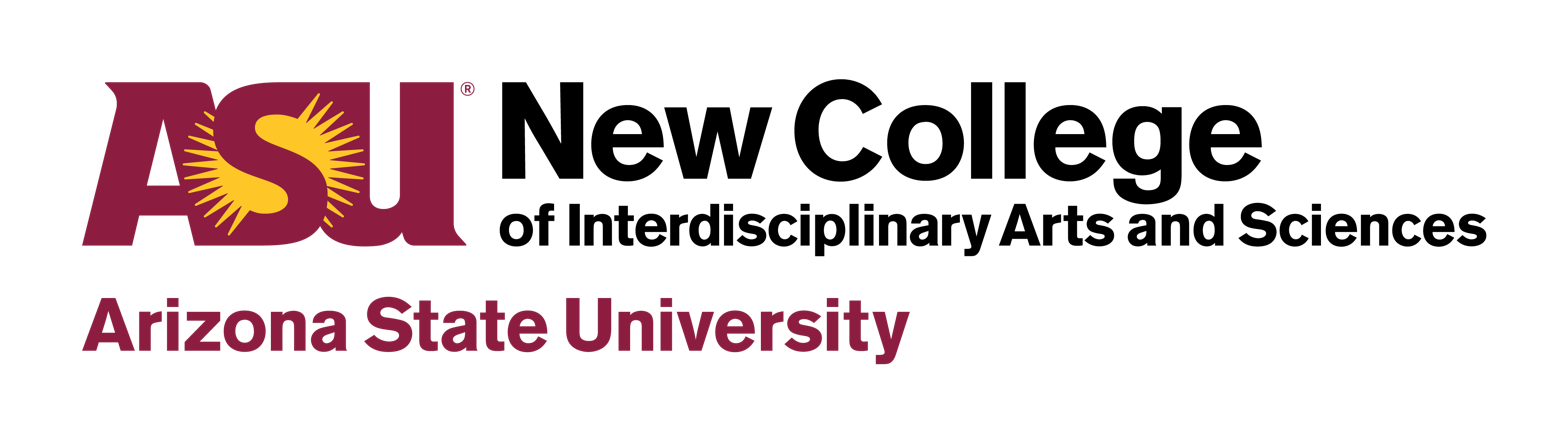
- Type: Public
- Established: 1984
- Dean: Dr. Todd Sandrin
- Students: 2700
- Location: Glendale, Arizona, United States; 33.608378°N 112.15988°W
- Campus: 300 acres; suburban
- Website: newcollege.asu.edu

The New College of Interdisciplinary Arts and Sciences (also referred to simply as New College) is one of three arts and science colleges within Arizona State University in the United States. New College is located on ASU's West Valley campus. The college resembles a traditional liberal arts and science college, but with an interdisciplinary focus, in which faculty are grouped into broad divisions rather than discipline-specific departments. In the 2021–2021 academic year, New College enrolled approximately 2700 students and 120 faculty.

== Academics ==
=== Degree programs ===
New College has 45 undergraduate degree programs and 15 graduate degree programs leading to bachelor's, master's and Ph.D. degrees in the liberal arts and sciences. Many of the degree programs are unique to the college within the larger university. Academic programs are divided among four schools: Humanities, Arts and Cultural Studies, Interdisciplinary Forensics, Mathematical and Natural Sciences, and Social and Behavioral Sciences.

=== Research ===
Being within a research university, New College is research-oriented, with a particular focus on involving undergraduate students. and with research on interdisciplinary topics. New College faculty are awarded nearly $5 million annually for their research and are members of the ASU Graduate Faculty, and may advise Ph.D. students in doctoral programs in each faculty member's respective academic field.
