= Claude Olney =

College professor and author (1931–1995)

Claude Olney (1931–1995) was a college professor and author of the popular academic system, Where There's a Will There's an A, a collection of simple grade-improvement tips for students.

== Personal life ==
Claude Olney resided in Scottsdale, Arizona. Olney was a business professor at Arizona State University. Where There's a Will There's an A, a collection of simple grade-improvement tips for students. He later wrote the book, The Bucks Start Here: How to Turn Your Hidden Assets Into Money.

== Where There's a Will There's an A ==
Olney's lectures began as a result of his son's average to mediocre academic record. Olney did a significant amount of research and found that not all methods worked for every student. Eventually he utilized a number of methods, and started to market it. Olney believed that "Getting good grades is a matter of using the right skills and techniques, not merely a matter of IQ." Eventually he got to the point of selling almost 8,000 copies of his lectures per week. He would eventually enlist the help of celebrities like John Ritter to help push the tapes.
