= Capital improvement plan =

A capital improvement plan (CIP), or capital improvement program, is a short-range plan, usually four to ten years, that identifies capital projects and equipment purchases, provides a planning schedule and identifies options for financing the plan.
