= Arizona State Sun Devils football =

Football team of Arizona State University

2026 Arizona State Sun Devils football team
- First season: 1897; 129 years ago
- Athletic director: Graham Rossini
- Head coach: Kenny Dillingham; 3rd season, 28–21 (.571)
- Location: Tempe, Arizona
- Stadium: Mountain America Stadium (capacity: 53,599)
- NCAA division: Division I FBS
- Conference: Big 12
- Colors: Maroon and gold
- All-time record: 642–432–24 (.596)
- CFP record: 0–1 (.000)
- Bowl record: 15–18–1 (.456)

National championships
- Unclaimed: 1970, 1975

College Football Playoff appearances
- 2024

Conference championships
- Border: 1931, 1939, 1940, 1952, 1957, 1959, 1961 WAC: 1969, 1970, 1971, 1972, 1973, 1975, 1977 Pac-12: 1986, 1996, 2007 Big 12: 2024

Division championships
- Pac-12 South: 2013
- Consensus All-Americans: 16
- Rivalries: Arizona (rivalry); Utah

Uniforms
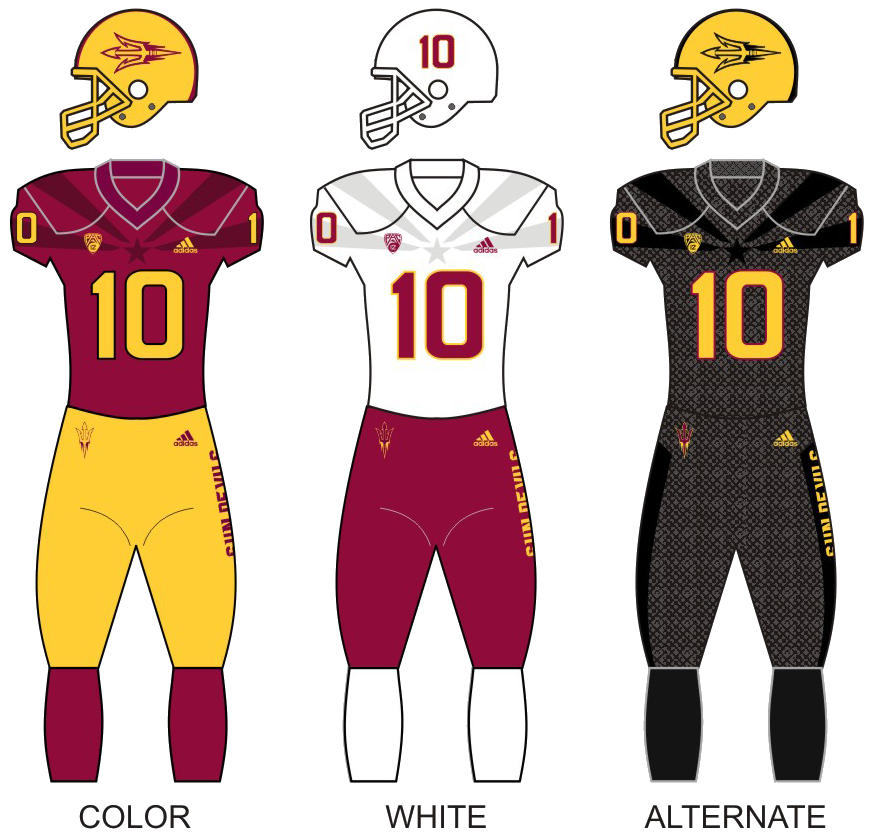
- Fight song: "Maroon & Gold"
- Mascot: Sparky
- Marching band: Arizona State University Sun Devil Marching Band
- Outfitter: Adidas
- Website: TheSunDevils.com

The Arizona State Sun Devils football team represents Arizona State University (ASU) in the sport of American college football. The Sun Devils team competes in the Football Bowl Subdivision (FBS) of the National Collegiate Athletic Association (NCAA) as a member of the Big 12 Conference. ASU has fielded a football team since 1897. The Sun Devils are led by head coach Kenny Dillingham and play their home games at Mountain America Stadium in Tempe, Arizona. The Sun Devils have won 18 conference titles.

A number of successful and professional football players once played for ASU. The school has 3 unanimous All-Americans and 16 consensus selections. Among the most lauded players the school has produced are Pat Tillman, Terrell Suggs, Jake Plummer, Mike Haynes, Darren Woodson, Charley Taylor, Curley Culp and John Henry Johnson.

In addition to its players, ASU's football program has had several notable head coaches, including Hall of Famers Dan Devine and John Cooper and national champion Dennis Erickson. The all-time school wins leader is Hall of Fame coach Frank Kush, for whom Frank Kush Field at Mountain America Stadium is named. Kush also consistently led the Sun Devils to victory against the Arizona Wildcats, ASU's traditional rival, losing to the Wildcats only twice between 1963 and 1979.

== History ==
=== Early history (1896–1957) ===
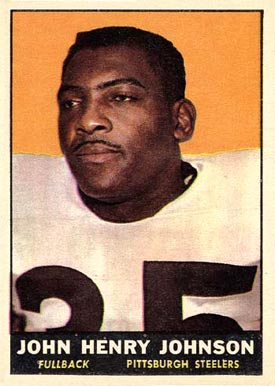
Hall of Fame RB John Henry Johnson played at ASU in the early 1950s

Frederick M. Irish served as the first head football coach at the Territorial Normal School, renamed Tempe Normal School in 1903 and now known as Arizona State University, coaching from 1896 to 1906 and compiling a record of 12–8. Territorial Normal did not field a football team in 1897, 1898, or 1901. George Schaeffer served as the head football coach at Tempe Normal School from 1914 to 1916, compiling a record of 7–8. Aaron McCreary oversaw the school's football program from 1923 to 1929. During this time, the school changed its nickname from the Owls to the Bulldogs and the name of the school was changed to Arizona State University. McCreary left ASU with a 25–17–4 record. Ted Shipkey led the Arizona State football program from 1930 to 1932, compiling a record of 13–10–2. Shipkey was replaced by Rudy Lavik, who led Arizona State to a less impressive 13–26–3 mark in his five seasons. Dixie Howell served as ASU's head coach from 1938 to 1941, compiling a record of 23–15–4. In 1947, Ed Doherty became head coach at Arizona State, where he compiled a 25–17 record from 1947 to 1950. He left ASU five days after defeating rival Arizona, 47–13, because he felt that he didn't have enough job security.

Clyde Smith took over the reins of the Arizona State football program in 1952, and under his leadership, they compiled a record of 15–13–1. Smith resigned following the 1954 season. On February 5, 1955, Michigan State assistant coach Dan Devine accepted the head coaching position at Arizona State. Joining him as an assistant was Frank Kush, who would have even greater success at the school after Devine's departure. During his three years, Devine compiled a record of 27–3–1 (.887), including a spotless 10–0 mark during his final campaign. In that last season, Devine's team led the nation in total offense and scoring, averaging just under 40 points per game in the latter category. Devine's success at Arizona State resulted in an offer from Missouri, which he accepted on December 18, 1957.

=== Frank Kush era (1958–1979) ===
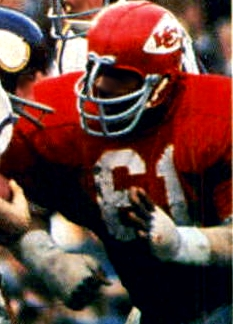
Hall of Fame DT Curley Culp played at ASU from 1965 to 1967

Coach Frank Kush in 1972

Frank Kush was promoted to head coach, a position he would hold for 22 years.

Kush compiled a record of 176–54–1, with only one losing season. In his first 11 years, he captured two conference titles and finished runner-up 5 times. That success led to him accepting head coach at the University of Pittsburgh on January 4, 1969. However, just 5 days later, Kush had a change of heart and returned to Arizona State. Kush's return would begin a memorable era with 5 consecutive Western Athletic Conference championships as the team won 50 of 56 games from 1969 to 1973. Arizona State won the 1970 Peach Bowl and the first three editions of the Fiesta Bowl. In 1974, the team dropped to 7–4, but bounced back the following year 12–0, capping the year with a thrilling 17–14 win over the Nebraska Cornhuskers in the Fiesta Bowl, a game in which Kush's son, Danny, kicked three field goals, including the winner. 1976 saw the team fall to 4–7, but another comeback resulted the next year with a 9–3 mark. In that year's Fiesta Bowl, the Sun Devils lost a bowl game for the only time under Kush's leadership, with a 42–30 defeat to Penn State. In 1978, Kush's team once again finished 9–3, this time defeating Rutgers in the Garden State Bowl.

In September 1979 former Sun Devil punter Kevin Rutledge filed a $1.1 million lawsuit against the school, accusing Kush and his staff of mental and physical harassment that forced him to transfer. The most dramatic charge was that Kush had punched Rutledge in the mouth, after a bad punt in the October 28, 1978, game against the Washington Huskies. During the next few weeks, overzealous fans turned things ugly when the insurance office of Rutledge's father suffered a fire and the family's attorney received death threats. On October 13, 1979, Kush was fired for interfering with the school's investigation into Rutledge's allegations. Athletic director Fred Miller cited Kush's alleged attempts to pressure players and coaches into keeping quiet. The decision came just three hours before the team's home game against Washington. Kush was allowed to coach the game, with the Sun Devils pulling off an emotional 12–7 upset of the sixth-ranked Huskies, fueled by the angry crowd incensed by the decision. After the game, Kush was carried off the field by his team. The win gave him a 3–2 record on the season, but all three victories were forfeited when it was determined Arizona State had used ineligible players.

Future NFL players who played under Kush include Charley Taylor, Curley Culp, Danny White, Benny Malone, Mike Haynes, and John Jefferson and Steve Holden. Baseball Hall of Famer Reggie Jackson played a year of football for Kush on a scholarship, before switching to baseball.

=== Darryl Rogers era (1980–1984) ===
Darryl Rogers replaced Kush and led the Sun Devils to a 37–18–1 record in five seasons. The best season of the Rogers era came in 1982, a 10–2 campaign that resulted in a Fiesta Bowl win and a No. 6 ranking in the final AP and Coaches' polls. Rogers accepted an offer to serve as head coach of the NFL's Detroit Lions and left ASU after the 1984 season.

=== John Cooper era (1985–1987) ===
John Cooper left his post as Tulsa head coach and became the head coach at Arizona State in 1985. His teams played in three consecutive bowl games, including the 1987 Rose Bowl. Notably, he was just 0–2–1 against arch-rival Arizona. He accepted the job as head coach at Ohio State on December 31, 1987. The 1986 team won the school's first Pacific-10 Championship and went on to defeat the Michigan Wolverines in the 1987 Rose Bowl.

=== Larry Marmie era (1988–1991) ===
ASU promoted Larry Marmie from defensive coordinator to head coach to replace Cooper. Marmie's tenure was marked by mediocrity and disappointment, with a 6–5 mark in 1988, a 6–4–1 record in 1989, a 4–7 campaign in 1990, and a 6–5 season in 1991. School administrators fired Marmie following the 1991 season, amidst fan impatience.

=== Bruce Snyder era (1992–2000) ===
Bruce Snyder left California to become ASU's head coach in 1992. Snyder's 58 wins and nine-year tenure as head coach at Arizona State each rank second in school history to marks set by Frank Kush. Snyder led ASU to four bowl games including a win in the 1997 Sun Bowl. More than 40 ASU players coached by Snyder were selected in the National Football League Draft, including seven in the first round, and more than 40 others signed free agent contracts in the National Football League. In 1996, Snyder led the Sun Devils to one of the finest seasons in school history and was named Pacific-10 Coach of the Year. The 1996 squad finished with an 11–1 record and captured the Pacific-10 championship. The Sun Devils stunned the top-ranked and two-time defending national champion Nebraska Cornhuskers in the season's third game. Arizona State reeled off the third undefeated regular season in school history en route 1997 Rose Bowl, where they came within 19 seconds of a victory over Ohio State. Had they won, the Sun Devils would have likely won at least a share of the national championship, as they would have been the only undefeated major-conference team in the nation. For his efforts that season, Snyder won a number of national coaching awards, including the Paul "Bear" Bryant Award and the Walter Camp Coach of the Year Award. Snyder stepped down as ASU head coach following the 2000 season.

=== Dirk Koetter era (2001–2006) ===
Boise State head coach Dirk Koetter was hired to replace Snyder in 2001. At Arizona State, Koetter compiled a 40–34 record and four Bowl appearances in six years. Under Koetter the Sun Devils were known for a vertical passing attack. On November 26, 2006, Koetter was terminated as the head football coach. His final game was the 2006 Hawaii Bowl on Christmas Eve, a 41–24 loss.

=== Dennis Erickson era (2007–2011) ===
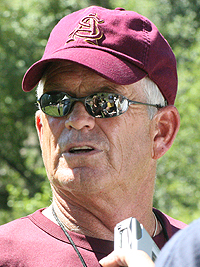
Coach Dennis Erickson

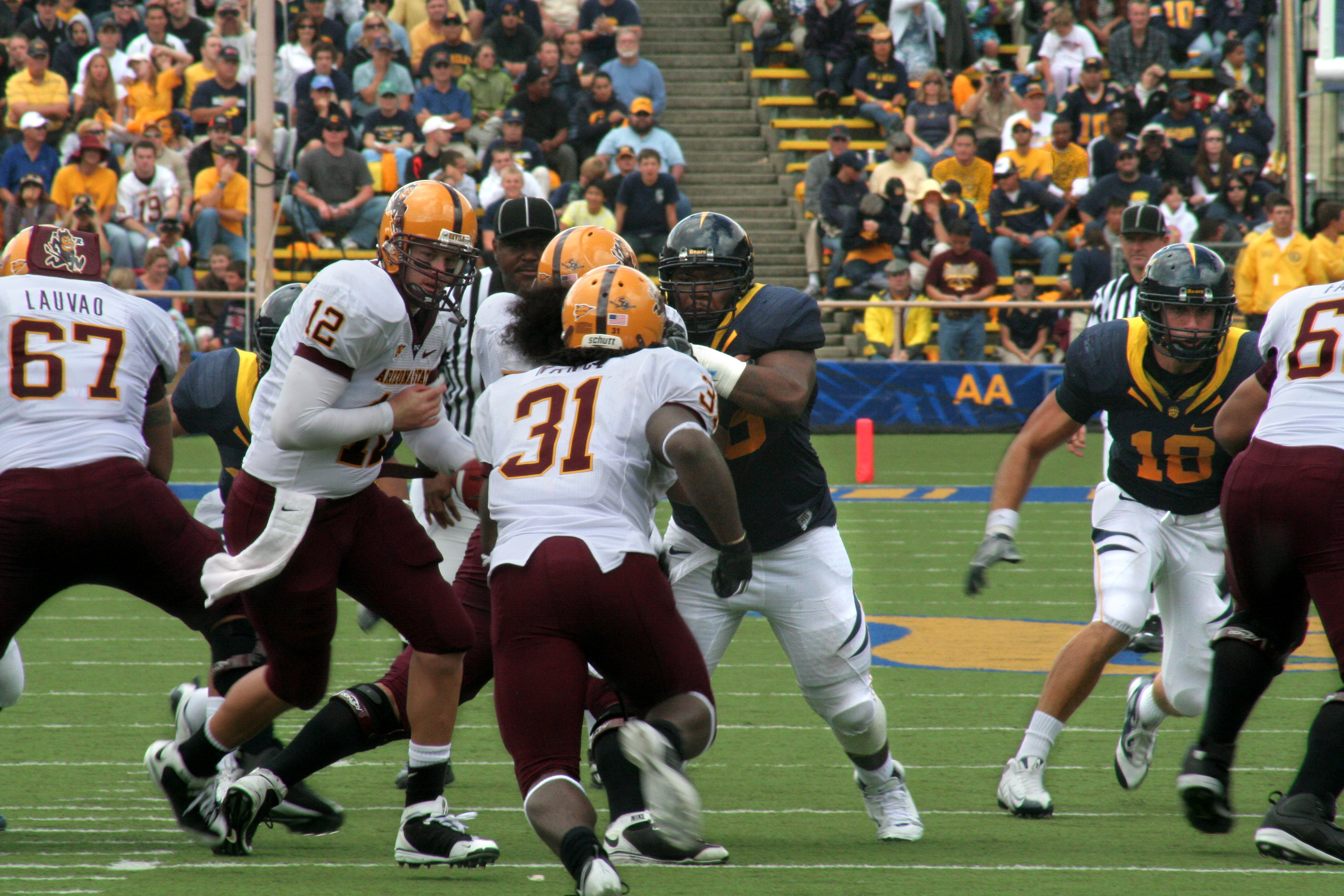
ASU quarterback Rudy Carpenter hands off to tailback Dimitri Nance in the 2008 game at California

Seasoned coaching veteran Dennis Erickson left Idaho for the opportunity to lead his fourth BCS program. Athletic director Lisa Love hired him on December 9 to replace the recently fired Dirk Koetter. Arizona State was Erickson's third head coaching stint in the Pacific-10, after Washington State and Oregon State. In addition to Idaho, Erickson also had college head coaching tenures at Wyoming and Miami, as well as in the NFL with the Seattle Seahawks and San Francisco 49ers.

Arizona State paid $2.8 million to Koetter and a $150,000 buyout to Idaho to complete the hiring of Erickson to a five-year contract. He immediately paid dividends for ASU, leading the Sun Devils to a 10–2 regular season record in 2007, a share of the Pacific-10 title, and a berth in the Holiday Bowl. Erickson was named the 2007 Pacific-10 Coach of the Year, becoming the first to ever win the award at three different Pacific-10 schools. He also coached another major award winner; placekicker Thomas Weber was named the Lou Groza Award winner. Erickson worked for the relatively low salary of $500,000 from ASU in his first season, with another $2 million paid by the 49ers for the last year of his NFL contract. The remaining four years of the original ASU contract paid $1.275 million per year. In 2008 the Arizona Board of Regents had approved a contract extension to keep Erickson at Arizona State through June 2012. Erickson's early success at ASU was not sustained, as the Sun Devils failed to have another winning season and lost three of four Territorial Cup rivalry games against Arizona. In his final four seasons, Erickson was 21–28 overall and 14–22 in conference. After opening the 2011 season with a promising 6–2 record, Arizona State suffered four straight Pac-12 defeats in November to end the regular season, and Erickson was fired on November 28. He was allowed to coach in their bowl game on December 22, but ASU was soundly beaten 56–24 by Boise State in the Maaco Bowl in Las Vegas for their fifth consecutive loss.

=== Todd Graham era (2012–2017) ===
Todd Graham was announced as Arizona State University's head coach on December 14, 2011. Graham came to ASU after only one season at Pittsburgh, informing his players and assistant coaches of his decision to leave Pitt for ASU via text message. Graham also previously served as head coach at Rice for one season and Tulsa for four seasons.

In his first season at Arizona State, the Sun Devils went 8–5 securing their first winning season since 2007. With a win in the Kraft Fight Hunger Bowl against the Navy Midshipmen, the 2012 Sun Devils won the final three games of the season for the first time since 1978. ESPN's Pac-12 Blog writer Ted Miller called Todd Graham's first season at Arizona State an "unquestioned success." In 2013, Graham continued to build positive momentum and led ASU the Pac-12 South title after defeating UCLA and rival Arizona. ASU finished the season 10–4 and ranked No. 21 in the AP Poll and No. 20 in the Coach's Poll. For his efforts in leading ASU to a Pac-12 South championship, Graham received the 2013 Pac-12 Coach of the Year Award. In 2014, ASU finished with yet another 10 win season by going 10–3 and ranking No. 12 in the final AP Poll and No. 14 in the final Coach's Poll. The season was capped off with Graham leading the Sun Devils to victory over Duke University in the Sun Bowl. The 2015 season saw a big drop off for the program as the Sun Devils finished a disappointing 6–7 with a 42–43 loss to the West Virginia Mountaineers in the Cactus Bowl. The trend continued into the next two seasons. The Sun Devils finished 2016 on a 6-game losing streak which culminated in a 5–7 record. 2017 would be Graham's final season. The team improved only slightly, finishing 7–6 with a Sun Bowl loss to North Carolina State, 31–52. Graham and Arizona State agreed to part ways on November 26, 2017, following a 7–5 regular season.

=== Herm Edwards era (2018–2022) ===
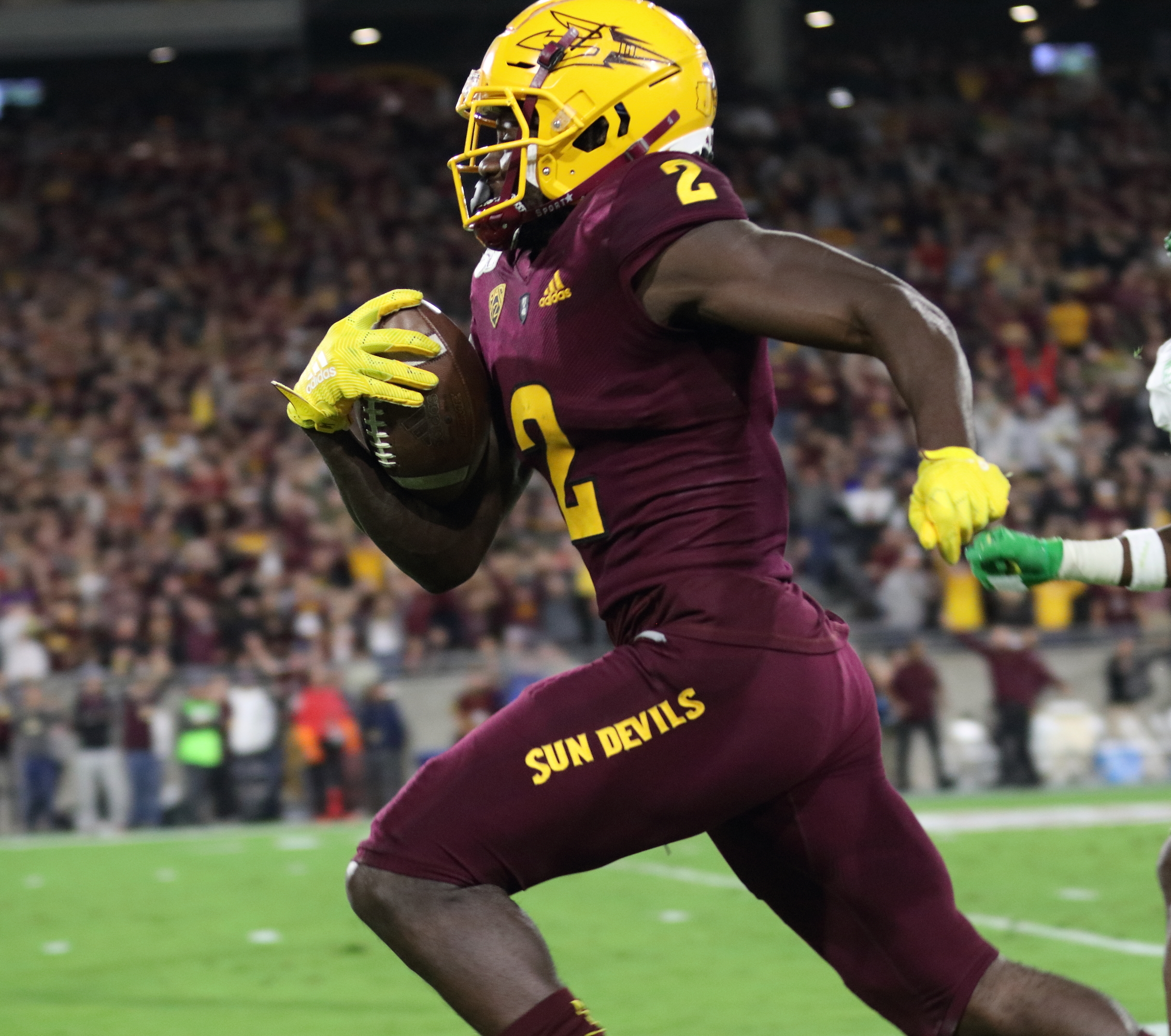
WR Brandon Aiyuk in 2019

On December 3, 2017, longtime NFL coach and ESPN analyst Herm Edwards was announced as the next head coach of the Sun Devils. Edwards kicked off the 2018 season with a 2–0 record, including a marquee win over then #15 Michigan State. Despite the promising start, the Devils dropped four of their next five games, sitting with a 1–3 conference record. Arizona State surged, winning their next three, but fell just short to Oregon and a Pac-12 South title. The Territorial Cup was played at Arizona Stadium on Saturday, November 24. Arizona led the Sun Devils by 19 points entering the fourth quarter, but a wild comeback by ASU, capped off by what would've been a game winning field goal by Arizona, resulted in the cup staying in Tempe. The Sun Devils then faced Fresno State In the Las Vegas Bowl, losing 31–20 and completing the season with a 7–6(5–4) record. Herm Edwards started his second season off 3–0, once again beating #18 Michigan State, this time on the road. ASU dropped their conference opener against Colorado, but bounced back with two straight wins, including a victory over #15 Cal to improve to 2–1 in conference play before dropping four consecutive games, officially disqualifying them from the Pac-12 South title. Arizona State shocked #6 Oregon at home, winning 31–28 in front of a packed stadium. The Sun Devils capped off the season with a win over rival Arizona, 24–14, and a Sun Bowl victory over Florida State, 20–14, finishing with a record of 8–5(4–5). Due to the COVID-19 pandemic Pac-12 teams had only six games scheduled. Arizona State dropped their first game to #20 USC 28–27 in heartbreaking fashion, and their following two contests were cancelled due to COVID complications within the Arizona State program. The Sun Devils returned from their nearly month long hiatus with a game versus UCLA, which they lost at home 25–18. ASU traveled to take on Arizona in Tucson for the 94th installment of the Territorial Cup. The Sun Devils slaughtered the Wildcats, 70–7, retaining the Cup for the third straight year. In their fourth and final game of the season, Arizona State capped off the season with a 46–33 win over Oregon State to finish the season 2–2 (2–2). In June 2021, rumors began circulating of several NCAA violations committed by Herm Edwards and the Arizona State staff, which were confirmed by several articles, including one published on June 23 by Pete Thamel of Yahoo! Sports. As a result of the allegations, tight ends coach Adam Breneman, defensive backs coach Christian Hawkins, and wide receivers coach Prentice Gill were placed and remain on administrative leave. Despite the numerous allegations of violations and rumors that the entire staff may be fired after the season, Herm Edwards and his Sun Devils finished 8–5 overall and 6–3 in Pac-12 play. The season concluded with a 20–13 loss to Wisconsin in the SRS Distribution Las Vegas Bowl. During the 2021-2022 offseason, multiple coaches including Zak Hill and Antonio Pierce resigned. 17 players including the starting quarterback Jayden Daniels and All-American linebacker Eric Gentry, entered the transfer portal as a result of the investigation and NIL. On September 18, 2022, Arizona State fired Edwards the day following a 30–21 loss to Eastern Michigan.

On April 19, 2024, Arizona State and Edwards received four years of probation, an undisclosed fine, 8 vacated wins in which ineligible players competed, a reduced number of scholarships and recruiting restrictions, as well as an accepted self-imposed punishment of a 2024 bowl ban. The violations occurred during the 2020 dead period during the COVID-19 pandemic. After the vacated wins, Edwards finished with a record of 18–20 at Arizona State.

=== Kenny Dillingham era (since 2023) ===
On November 27, 2022, Kenny Dillingham, previously the offensive coordinator and quarterbacks coach for Oregon, was named as Arizona State's head coach. His first season with the team resulted in a 3–9 finish, with a 15–7 loss to the eventual National Champion runners-up Washington Huskies.

Kenny had led ASU in the 2024 season to a 5–1 start with an upset win against No. 16 Utah. In week 13, Dillingham led the Sun Devils to a 24–14 upset victory over No. 20 Kansas State. After the victory, the Sun Devils were ranked No. 21, their first time being ranked since 2019. In week 14, Dillingham and three touchdowns from running back Cam Skattebo led the Sun Devils to a 28–23 win over No. 20 BYU and brought the Sun Devils to the No. 16 rank. After beating rival Arizona 49–7 in their yearly matchup, ASU clinched an appearance in the Big 12 Championship Game, where they defeated Iowa State, 45–19. They were seeded 4th in the College Football Playoff, receiving a first round bye. ASU ultimately played in the Peach Bowl against the University of Texas on January 1, 2025. The Devils lost 39–31 in a two overtime "thriller" yet showed a level of competitiveness that captivated the nation. Tailback Cam Skattebo won Offensive MVP honors (the first player to be awarded despite losing the game in 26 years) after "rack[ing] up 284 total yards—143 rushing, 99 receiving, and 42 passing—two rushing touchdowns, a passing touchdown, and a two-point conversion.” The game is widely regarded as one of the greatest College Football Playoff games of all time.

== Conference affiliations ==
ASU has been a member of the Big 12 Conference since 2024.

- Independent (1897–1930)
- Border Conference (1931–1961)
- Western Athletic Conference (1962–1977)
- Pac-12 Conference (1978–2023)
- Big 12 Conference (2024–present)

== Championships ==
=== Conference championships ===
Arizona State has won 18 conference championships, seven in the Border Conference, seven in the Western Athletic Conference, three in the Pac-12 Conference, and one in the Big 12 Conference.

Year	Coach	Conference	Record	Conference record
1931	Ted Shipkey	Border	6–2	3–1
1939	Dixie Howell	Border	8–2–1	4–0
1940	Dixie Howell	Border	7–2–2	3–0–1
1952	Clyde B. Smith	Border	6–3	4–0
1957	Dan Devine	Border	10–0	4–0
1959	Frank Kush	Border	10–1	5–0
1961	Frank Kush	Border	7–3	3–0
1969	Frank Kush	WAC	8–2	6–1
1970	Frank Kush	WAC	11–0	7–0
1971	Frank Kush	WAC	11–1	7–0
1972	Frank Kush	WAC	10–2	5–1
1973†	Frank Kush	WAC	11–1	6–1
1975	Frank Kush	WAC	12–0	7–0
1977†	Frank Kush	WAC	9–3	6–1
1986	John Cooper	Pacific-10	10–1–1	5–1–1
1996	Bruce Snyder	Pacific-10	11–1	8–0
2007†	Dennis Erickson	Pacific-10	10–3	7–2
2024	Kenny Dillingham	Big 12	11–3	7–2

† Co-champions

=== Conference championship games ===
Arizona State has played in a Conference championship game twice. They played their first Pac-12 Conference Championship Game in 2013 against Stanford; losing 14–38. In 2024, they won the Big 12 Conference Championship Game 45–19 against Iowa State.

Year	Conference	Coach	Opponent	CG Results
2013	Pac-12	Todd Graham	Stanford	L 14–38
2024	Big 12	Kenny Dillingham	Iowa State	W 45–19

=== Unclaimed national championships ===
In 1970, ASU finished their season undefeated after defeating North Carolina 48–26 in the Peach Bowl. The Poling System (1935–1984) recognized ASU as the No. 1 team in their polling, securing ASU's first national championship voted by a major poll. The AP and Coaches polls did not recognize ASU as the national champions that year, but respectfully ranked ASU eighth and sixth in the nation.

In 1975, ASU finished an undefeated season by beating No. 6 Nebraska 17–14 in the Fiesta Bowl. ASU was ranked No. 2 in both the AP and Coaches final polls. (ASU received 5 of the 63 votes from the AP poll for the No. 1 ranking). Despite the AP and Coaches polls not picking ASU as No.1, ASU was recognized as the No. 1 team by multiple major selection polls, including Sporting News, and the National Championship Foundation. ASU was one of only two teams to finish undefeated that year (Arkansas State being the other).

ASU does not officially claim either national championship. The NCAA does acknowledge many lesser known claims to football National Championships in their official record book, including the 1970 and 1975 Arizona State teams. (Page 113 & 114 of 2018 NCAA Football Bowl Subdivision Records)

Season	Conference	Coach	Selector	Overall record	Conference record	Bowl	Final AP	Final Coaches
1970	WAC	Frank Kush	Poling System	11–0	7–0	W Peach Bowl	No. 6	No. 8
1975	WAC	Frank Kush	Sporting News/National Championship Foundation	12–0	8–0	W Fiesta Bowl	No. 2	No. 2

== Bowl games ==
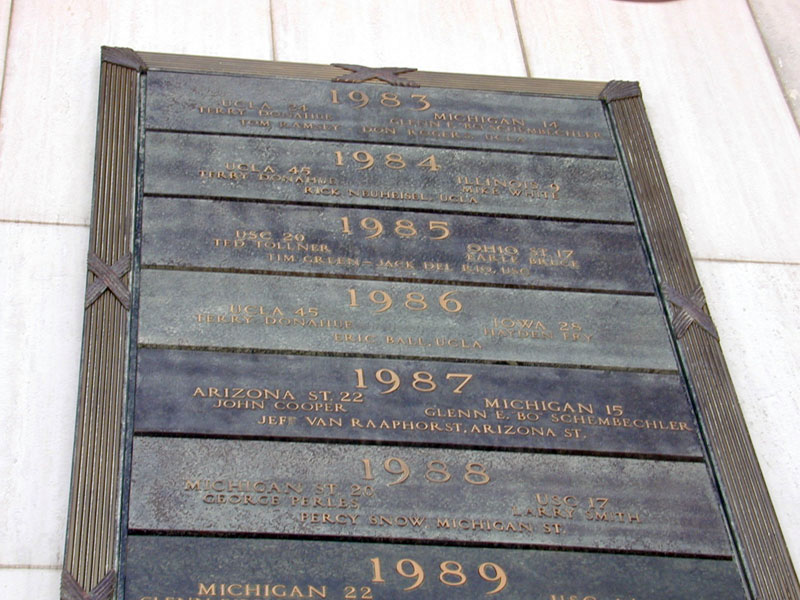
Arizona State at the Rose Bowl

Arizona State has played in 34 bowl games in its history. The Sun Devils have a bowl record of 15–18–1.

Date	Coach	Bowl	Opponent	Result
January 1, 1940	Dixie Howell	Sun Bowl	Catholic	T 0–0
January 2, 1941	Dixie Howell	Sun Bowl	Western Reserve	L 13–26
January 2, 1950	Ed Doherty	Salad Bowl	Xavier	L 21–33
January 1, 1951	Ed Doherty	Salad Bowl	Miami (OH)	L 21–34
December 30, 1970	Frank Kush	Peach Bowl	North Carolina	W 48–26
December 27, 1971	Frank Kush	Fiesta Bowl	Florida State	W 45–38
December 23, 1972	Frank Kush	Fiesta Bowl	Missouri	W 49–35
December 21, 1973	Frank Kush	Fiesta Bowl	Pittsburgh	W 28–7
December 26, 1975	Frank Kush	Fiesta Bowl	Nebraska	W 17–14
December 25, 1977	Frank Kush	Fiesta Bowl	Penn State	L 30–42
December 16, 1978	Frank Kush	Garden State Bowl	Rutgers	W 34–18
January 1, 1983	Darryl Rogers	Fiesta Bowl	Oklahoma	W 32–21
December 22, 1985	John Cooper	Holiday Bowl	Arkansas	L 17–18
January 1, 1987	John Cooper	Rose Bowl	Michigan	W 22–15
December 30, 1987	John Cooper	Freedom Bowl	Air Force	W 33–28
January 1, 1997	Bruce Snyder	Rose Bowl	Ohio State	L 17–20
December 31, 1997	Bruce Snyder	Sun Bowl	Iowa	W 17–7
December 25, 1999	Bruce Snyder	Aloha Bowl	Wake Forest	L 3–23
December 25, 2000	Bruce Snyder	Aloha Bowl	Boston College	L 17–31
December 27, 2002	Dirk Koetter	Holiday Bowl	Kansas State	L 27–34
December 31, 2004	Dirk Koetter	Sun Bowl	Purdue	W 27–23
December 27, 2005	Dirk Koetter	Insight Bowl	Rutgers	W 45–40
December 24, 2006	Dirk Koetter	Hawaiʻi Bowl	Hawaiʻi	L 24–41
December 27, 2007	Dennis Erickson	Holiday Bowl	Texas	L 34–52
December 22, 2011	Dennis Erickson	Maaco Bowl Las Vegas	Boise State	L 24–56
December 29, 2012	Todd Graham	Kraft Fight Hunger Bowl	Navy	W 62–28
December 30, 2013	Todd Graham	Holiday Bowl	Texas Tech	L 23–37
December 27, 2014	Todd Graham	Sun Bowl	Duke	W 36–31
January 2, 2016	Todd Graham	Cactus Bowl	West Virginia	L 42–43
December 29, 2017	Todd Graham	Sun Bowl	NC State	L 31–52
December 15, 2018	Herm Edwards	Las Vegas Bowl	Fresno State	L 20–31
December 31, 2019	Herm Edwards	Sun Bowl	Florida State	W 20–14
December 30, 2021	Herm Edwards	Las Vegas Bowl	Wisconsin	L 13–20 (vacated appearance)
January 1, 2025	Kenny Dillingham	CFP Quarterfinal at Peach Bowl	Texas	L 31–39 ^{2OT}
December 31, 2025	Kenny Dillingham	Sun Bowl	Duke	L 39–42

== Head coaches ==
Frank Kush

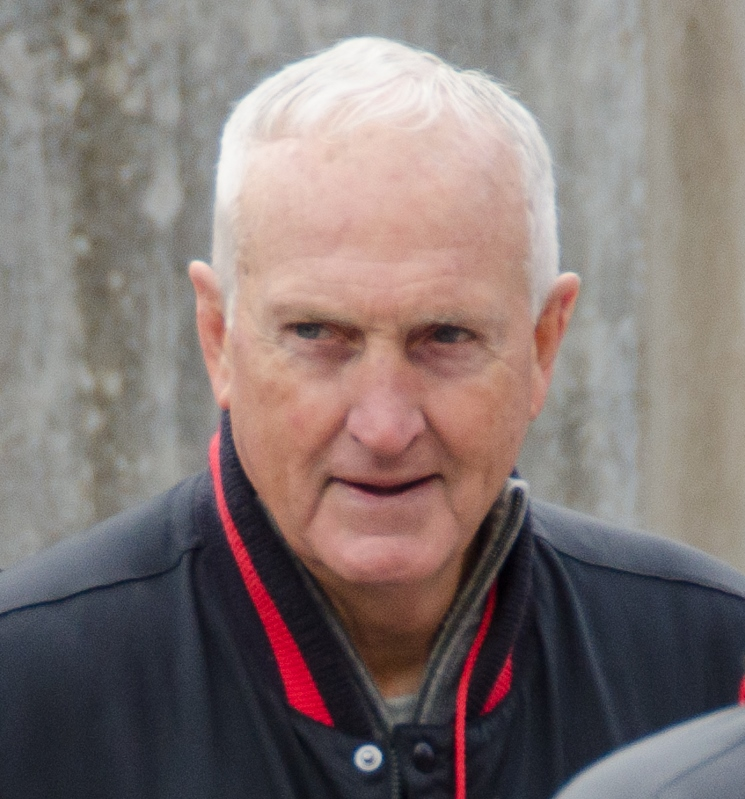
John Cooper

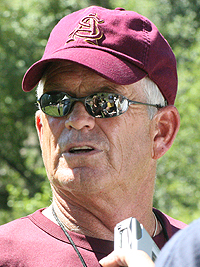
Dennis Erickson

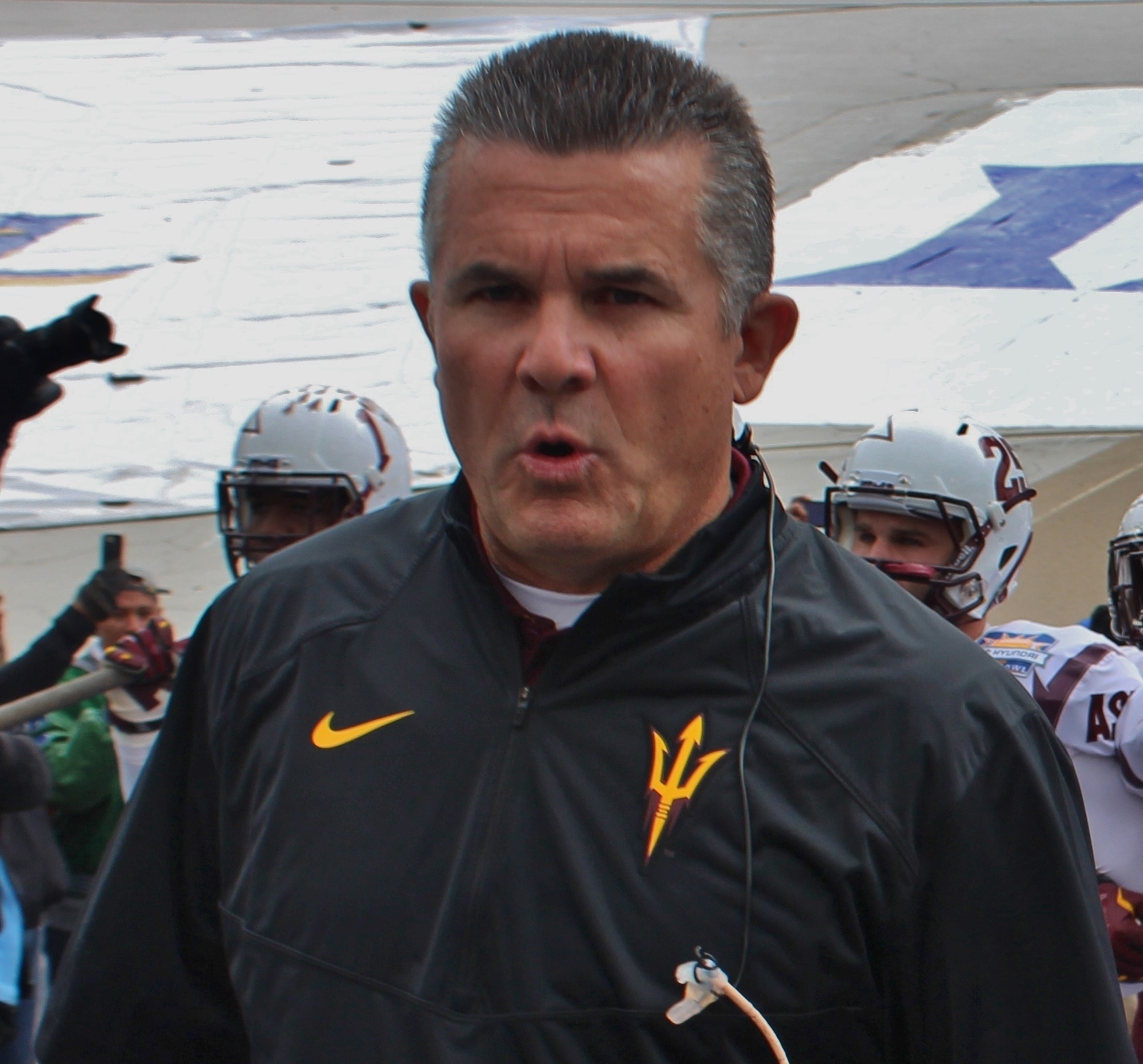
Todd Graham

Tenure	Coach	Years	Record	Pct.
1897–1906	Frederick M. Irish	8	12–8	.600
1914–1916	George Schaeffer	3	7–8	.467
1919	George E. Cooper	1	0–2	.000
1922	Ernest C. Wills	1	0–3–1	.125
1923–1929	Aaron McCreary	7	25–17–4	.587
1930–1932	Ted Shipkey	3	12–10–2	.542
1933–1937	Rudy Lavik	5	13–26–3	.345
1938–1941	Dixie Howell	4	23–15–4	.595
1942	Hilman Walker	1	2–8	.200
1946	Steve Coutchie	1	2–7–2	.273
1947–1950	Ed Doherty	4	25–17	.595
1951	Larry Siemering	1	6–3–1	.650
1952–1954	Clyde Smith	3	15–13–1	.534
1955–1957	Dan Devine	3	27–3–1	.887
1958–1979	Frank Kush	22	176–54–1	.764
1979 (interim)	Bob Owens	1	3–4	.429
1980–1984	Darryl Rogers	5	37–18–1	.670
1985–1987	John Cooper	3	25–9–2	.722
1988–1991	Larry Marmie	4	22–21–1	.511
1992–2000	Bruce Snyder	9	58–47	.552
2001–2006	Dirk Koetter	6	40–34	.541
2007–2011	Dennis Erickson	5	31–31	.500
2012–2017	Todd Graham	6	46–32	.590
2018–2022	Herm Edwards †	5	18–20†	.474
2022 (interim)	Shaun Aguano †	1	1–4†	.200
2023–present	Kenny Dillingham	3	22–17	.564

† Arizona State vacated 8 wins total due to NCAA violations from the 2020 season.

== Home stadiums ==
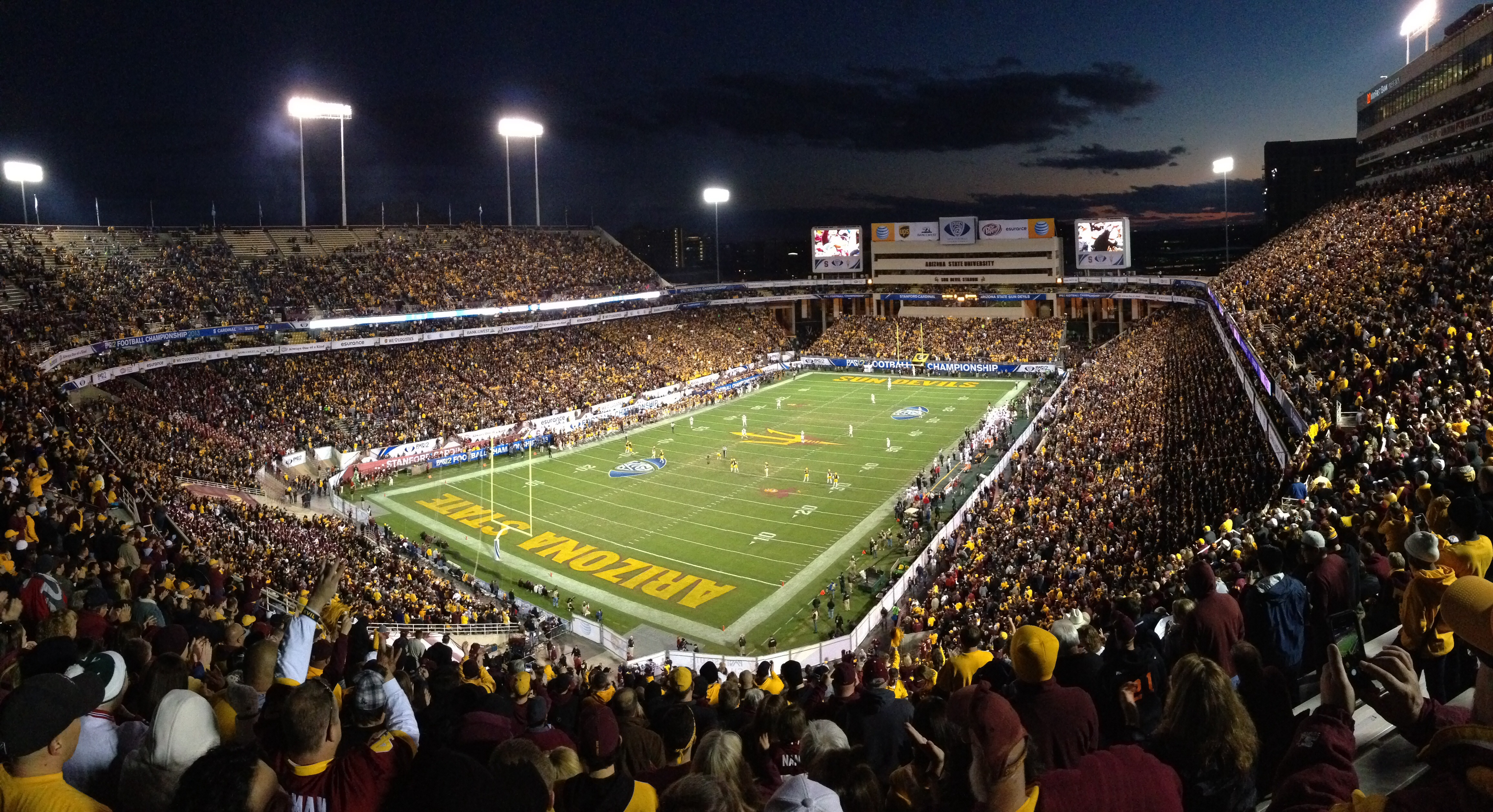
Mountain America Stadium

The Sun Devils play their home games at Frank Kush Field at Mountain America Stadium in Tempe, Arizona. Mountain America Stadium, formally known as Sun Devil Stadium, was constructed in 1958 and originally held a capacity of 30,000.

On September 21, 1996, the playing surface was renamed Frank Kush Field after the long time ASU coach in a 19–0 upset of then top-ranked Nebraska.

Prior to the construction of Mountain America Stadium, the Sun Devils played their home games at the following locations:

- 1897–1926 Normal Field
- 1927–1935 Irish Field
- 1936–1957 Goodwin Stadium

== Culture ==
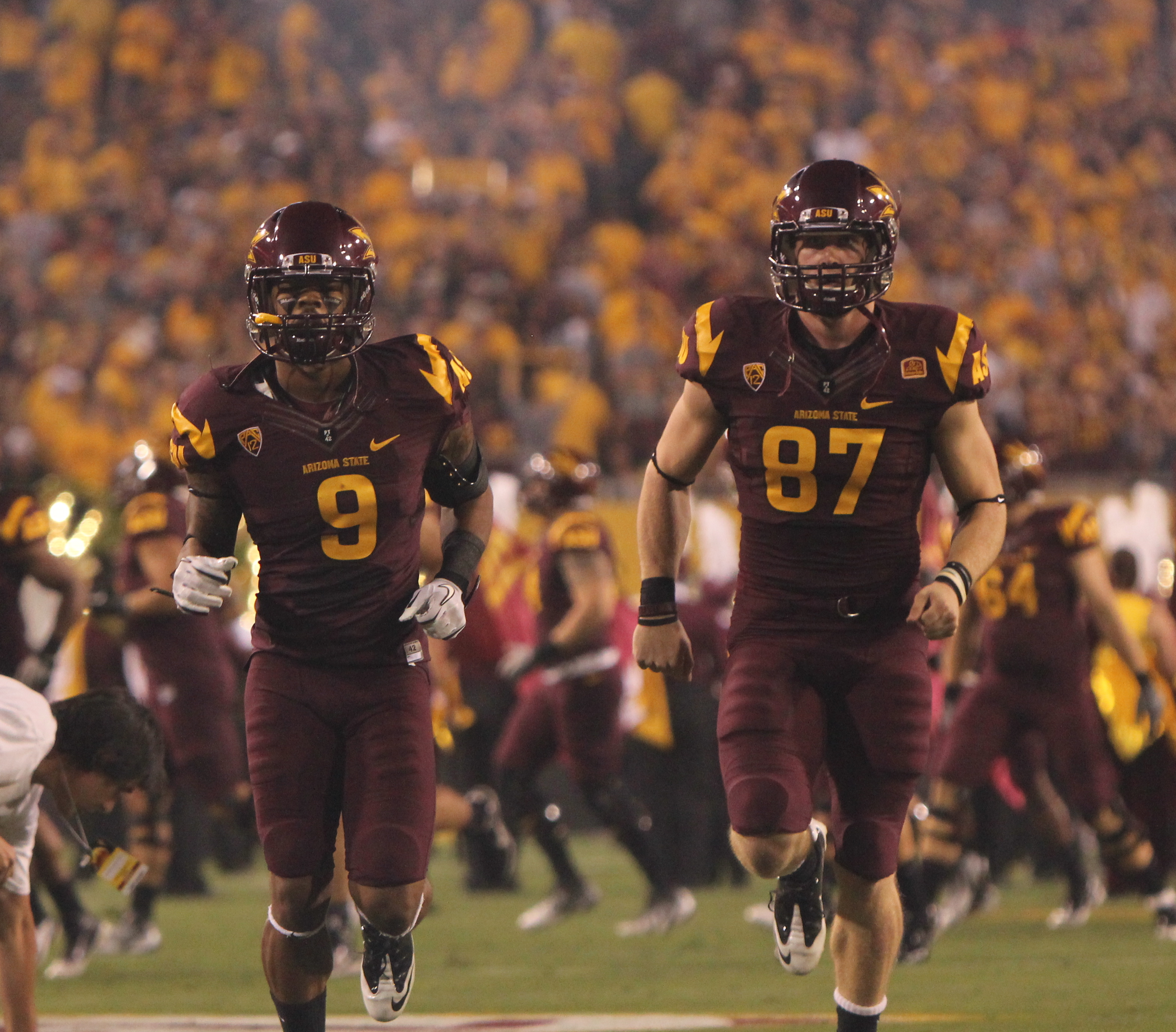
ASU's traditional uniform colors are maroon and gold

- Colors – Arizona State's traditional colors are maroon and gold.
- Songs – The fight songs for Arizona State are "Maroon and Gold" and "Go Go Devils". After a touchdown "Maroon and Gold" is played. After a field goal "Go Go Devils" is played. For big plays, a shortened version of either song is played.
- Mascot – Arizona State's mascot is "Sparky the Sun Devil". Sparky was adopted as ASU's mascot in 1946 following a vote was held to replace the Bulldog, the mascot at the time.
- Devil Walk – Prior to each home game, fans and the Sun Devil Marching Band welcomes the team inside Desert Financial Arena as they head to the football stadium. At the conclusion of the event, the marching band performs a short concert.
- Marching Band – (see Arizona State University Sun Devil Marching Band)
- Stomp the Bus – The entrance video of the Sun Devils featuring a giant Sparky crushing the opposing team's bus underfoot

Arizona State fields a more-than-300-member marching band that performs at all home football games, bowl games, and the rivalry game with the University of Arizona. In addition to halftime shows and stand tunes, the Sun Devil Marching Band always play the Arizona State fight songs and the Alma Mater.

== Rivalries ==
=== Arizona ===
Arizona State's longest and most intense rivalry is with the University of Arizona. The football game between the schools is nicknamed The Duel in the Desert, and the winner of the game receives the Territorial Cup. Arizona State won the first matchup in 1899 by a score of 11–2. Arizona holds the all-time series lead with a record of 52–46–1.

Since becoming a university in 1958, Arizona State has the overall lead in the rivalry series with a record of 38–29–1. Since ASU and Arizona became Pac-12 members in 1978, Arizona leads the series 24–23–1. And as of 2024 both compete as conference-foes in the Big 12.

=== Utah ===
Another one of the Sun Devil's conference rivals are the Utah Utes. This decade the recent match ups have added new intensity to the rivalry. In 2023, Utah routed Arizona State 55–3, marking one of the most dominant performances in series history. However, Arizona State bounced back in 2024 with a 27–12 win in Tempe, avenging the prior year's defeat and reigniting the rivalry in their new conference setting. As of the 2025 season, ASU leads the all-time series 23–13.

== Practice facilities ==
=== Bill Kajikawa Practice Fields ===
Bill Kajikawa Practice Fields, located on Sixth Street and Rural Road, is normally where Sun Devil football team practices when weather permits.

=== Camp Tontozona ===
An Arizona State University property, is a 36-acre (150,000 m^{2}) camp just outside Payson created by former legendary coach Frank Kush was used as a bonding place for his players. Tontozona has marked the unofficial start of the Sun Devils' seasons from 1960 to 2008. Due to the knack of losing practices to rainouts, short and torn up fields leading to excessive injuries, and travel costs, the team decided to move camp back to Tempe campus with the arrival of the Devil Dome. After a 4-year absence the Sun Devils returned to Camp Tontozona starting in Aug 2012. The team was able to make the return after a short fund raising effort by fans and alumni brought in over $160,000.

=== Verde Dickey Dome ===
Formerly opened as Devil Dome and nicknamed,"The Bubble", $8.4 million practice facility broke ground on May 15, 2008 to provide a climate controlled space for the Sun Devil football team, Sun Devil Marching Band, ASU Intramurals and for other athletic department events. Before its full completion and turn over from the contractor to the university on the night of August 28, 2008, a powerful storm brought it down. The Bubble was re-inflated early October and was fully repaired for use in July 2009. During the 2009 season the facility was renamed and dedicated to generous donor Dr. Verde Dickey as the Verde Dickey Center, to not only commemorate his donation for the facility but also his donations to Sun Devil Marching Band and projects such as renovation of locker rooms in Wells Fargo Arena and Mountain America Stadium, Weatherup Basketball Center, The Athletes Performance Center, John Spini Gymnastics Center, and wrestling practice facility.

== Retired numbers ==
Arizona State Sun Devils retired numbers
No.	Player	Pos.	Tenure	Ref.
11	Danny White	QB, P	1971–1973	
27	Bobby Mulgado	HB	1954–1957	
33	Wilford White	HB	1947–1950	
40	Mike Haynes	CB	1974–1975	
42	Pat Tillman	LB	1994–1997	

== All-Americans ==
ASU has produced 16 Consensus All-Americans in their history. In addition, 3 ASU players were deemed Unanimous selections; Al Harris, Terrell Suggs and Zane Gonzalez.

Year	Name	Honors
1931	Norris Steverson	AP
1950	Wilford White	AP
1965	Ben Hawkins	Time
1967	Curley Culp	Time, SN
1968	Ron Pritchard	†
1969	Art Malone	NEA
1970	J.D. Hill	SN, Time, AP
	Gary Venturo	UPI
	Windlan Hall	UPI
	Mike Tomco	UPI
1971	Windlan Hall	UPI, AP, Football News
	Junior Ah You	UPI, AP
	Woody Green	UPI, AP
1972	Woody Green	†
	Steve Holden	Time, FW, NEA
1973	Woody Green	†
	Danny White	FW, Time, AP, NEA
1974	Bob Breunig	Football Coaches, Time, SN, AP, UPI
	John Houser	AP, UPI
	Freddie Williams	AP, UPI
	Clifton Alapa	AP
	Kory Schuknecht	AP
	Mike Haynes	AP, UPI
1975	Mike Haynes	†
	Larry Gordon	Time, AP
	John Jefferson	AP
	Freddie Williams	AP
	Willie Scroggins	AP
	Randy Moore	AP
	Mike Martinez	AP
1976	John Harris	AP
1977	George Fadok	AP
	Al Harris	AP
	John Harris	AP
	John Jefferson John Jefferson, WR	†
	Tim Peterson	AP
	Dennis Sproul	AP
1978	Al Harris	‡
1979	Bob Kohrs	FN, AP, SN
	Mark Malone	SN
1980	John Mistler	PFW, AP
	Willie Gittens	AP
	Vernon Maxwell	AP
	Mike Richardson	AP
1981	Mike Black	AP
	Mike Pagel	AP, SN
	Dan Mackie	FN
	Vernon Maxwell	AP
	John Meyer	SN
	Mike Richardson	†
	Gerald Riggs	AP, SN
	Luis Zendejas	AP, SN
1982	Mike Black	AP, UPI
	Jim Jeffcoat	AP, UPI, FN, SN
	Vernon Maxwell	AP, UPI, FW, FN, Kodak, WC, SN
	Mike Richardson	†
1983	Luis Zendejas	†
	David Fulcher	SN
1984	Doug Allen	AP
	Darryl Clack	AP
	David Fulcher David Fulcher, S	†
	Tom Magazzeni	AP
	Jim Meyer	AP
	Dan Saleaumua	AP
	Mark Shupe	AP
	Luis Zendejas	AP
1985	George Battle	AP
	Aaron Cox	AP
	David Fonoti	AP
	David Fulcher	†
	Dan Saleaumua	AP
	Mike Schuh	AP
	Scott Stephen	AP
1986	Aaron Cox	AP
	Jeff Gallimore	AP, HM
	Darryl Harris	AP
	Skip McClendon	Kodak, AP
	Randall McDaniel	Kodak, AP
	Dan Saleaumua	AP
	Scott Stephen	AP
	Danny Villa	†
	Channing Williams	AP
	Darren Willis	AP
1987	Eric Allen	AP
	Greg Clark	AP
	Aaron Cox	AP
	Darryl Harris	AP
	Randall McDaniel Randall McDaniel, OL	†
	Shawn Patterson	FN, AP
1988	Mark Tingstad	AP
1989	Nathan LaDuke	(SN, AP
	Ron Fair	AP
1990	Nathan LaDuke	SN, FN, AP, NEA
1992	Shante Carver	NEA, AP
	Brett Wallerstedt	AP
1993	Shante Carver	FWAA, NEA, FN
1995	Juan Roque	2n, FN
	Jake Plummer	FN
1996	Terry Battle	SN, AP
	Jake Plummer	FWAA, SN, AP, AAFF
	Keith Poole	AP
	Derrick Rodgers	FWAA, AP, AFQ, AAFF
	Juan Roque	†
1997	Ryan Kealy	SN- Freshman
	Vixtor Leyva	SN-Freshman
	Kyle Murphey	FN, AP, SN
	Grey Ruegamer	SN
	Jeremy Staat	FWAA, AP, SN
	Pat Tillman Pat Tillman, LB	AP, SN, FN
1998	Steven Baker	SN- Freshman
	Todd Heap	SN-Freshman
	Scott Peters	SN-Freshman
	J.R. Redmond	AP
	Grey Ruegamer	WC, AP, FN
1999	Marvel Smith	FN, SN
	Todd Heap	AP
2000	Adam Archuleta	GNS, AP, WC
	Todd Heap	GNS, AP, FN
	Terrell Suggs	FN-Freshman, SN-Freshman
2001	Levi Jones	FN
	Shaun McDonald	FN
	Keith Poole	SN-Freshman
	Terrell Suggs	FN
2002	Shaun McDonald	SN, AP, CNN
	Terrell Suggs Terrell Suggs, LB	‡
	Chaz White	SN-Freshman
2004	Derek Hagan	Rivals
	Chris MacDonald	Rivals-Freshman, FWAA-Freshman, SN-Freshman
	Zach Miller	SN, Rivals, SN-Freshman, Rivals-Freshman, FWAA-Freshman
2005	Terry Richardson	SI
	Derek Hagan	AP, Rivals, SI
	Rudy Carpenter	SN-Freshman
2006	Dexter Davis	SN-Freshman
	Travis Goethel	SN-Freshman
	Zach Miller Zach Miller, TE	†
2007	Omar Bolden	Rivals-Freshman, CFN-Freshman, SN-Freshman
	Robert James	Rivals, SI
	Thomas Weber	†
2012	Will Sutton Will Sutton, DT	†
2013	Will Sutton	AP, CBS, USAT
2014	Jaelen Strong	ESPN
2016	Zane Gonzalez Zane Gonzalez, K	‡
2024	Cam Skattebo	AP, Athletic, CBS, ESPN, SI

† Consensus All-Americans

‡ Unanimous All-Americans

== Individual Achievements ==
=== Student-Athletes ===
- Lombardi Award

2002 - Terrell Suggs

- Ted Hendricks Award

2002 - Terrell Suggs

- Bronko Nagurski Trophy

2002 - Terrell Suggs

- Bill Willis Trophy

2002 - Terrell Suggs

- Lou Groza Award

2007 - Thomas Weber

2016 - Zane Gonzalez

=== Coaches ===
- Woody Hayes Trophy

1996 - Bruce Snyder

- AFCA Coach of the Year Award

1975 - Frank Kush

1996 - Bruce Snyder

- Walter Camp Coach of the Year Award

1975 - Frank Kush

1996 - Bruce Snyder

- The Sporting News College Football Coach of the Year

1986 - John Cooper

1996 - Bruce Snyder

== Heisman Trophy Finalists ==
Arizona State has yet to have a player win the Heisman trophy. However, 4 players have finished in the top 10. Most recently Cam Skattebo whom finished in 5th place.

Year	Name	Position	Rank in Heisman voting	Points
1973	Woody Green	RB	8th	247
1973	Danny White	QB	9th	166
1996	Jake Plummer	QB	3rd	685
2024	Cam Skattebo	RB	5th	170

== College Football Hall of Fame Members ==
Name	Position	Year
David Fulcher	Safety	2021
Jake Plummer	Quarterback	2019
Bob Breunig	Linebacker	2015
Pat Tillman	Linebacker	2010
Randall McDaniel	Guard	2008
Ron Pritchard	Linebacker	2003
Mike Haynes	Cornerback	2000
Danny White	Quarterback	1997
Frank Kush	Head coach	1995
John Jefferson	Wide receiver	1983

== Pro Football Hall of Fame Members ==
Name	Position	Pro Bowls	# of Seasons	Year	Career History
Eric Allen	CB	6	14	2025	Philadelphia Eagles (1988–1994), New Orleans Saints (1995–1997), Oakland Raiders (1998–2001)
Curley Culp	DL / DT	6	14	2013	Denver Broncos (1968), Kansas City Chiefs (1968–1974), Houston Oilers (1974–1980), Detroit Lions (1980–1981)
Randall McDaniel	LG	12	14	2009	Minnesota Vikings (1988–1999), Tampa Bay Buccaneers (2000–2001)
Mike Haynes	DB / CB	9	14	1997	New England Patriots (1976–1982), Los Angeles Raiders (1983–1989)
John Henry Johnson	HB/FB	4	13	1987	San Francisco 49ers (1954–1956), Detroit Lions (1957–1959), Pittsburgh Steelers (1960–1965), Houston Oilers (1966)
Charley Taylor	WR / RB	8	13	1984	Washington Redskins (1964–1975, 1977)

== Other notable players ==
- Brandon Aiyuk – NFL Wide receiver and return specialist for the San Francisco 49ers
- Jon Baker, Retired NFL Placekicker, Super Bowl Champion with Dallas Cowboys
- Kalen Ballage RB, previously Miami Dolphins, current CFL player
- Ron Brown – Retired NFL Wide receiver, 1-time All-Pro and 1-time Pro Bowler
- Dave Buchanan – Retired CFL all-star Running back
- Vontaze Burfict LB, Retired NFL Linebacker, 1-time Pro Bowler
- Ken Dyer – AFL and NFL player
- George Flint – Retired AFL Guard
- D.J. Foster - Retired NFL player, Super Bowl Champion with New England Patriots
- Mark Gastineau – Retired NFL Defensive end
- John F. Goodman – Retired United States Marine Corps Lieutenant General; Former NFL Quarterback
- Lawrence Guy - Retired NFL Defensive Tackle, Super Bowl Champion with New England Patriots
- Bruce Hardy – Retired NFL Tight end
- N'Keal Harry – Current NFL wide receiver for the Minnesota Vikings
- James Hood – Retired NFL CFL Wide receiver
- Bernard Henry – Retired NFL Wide receiver
- Paul Justin – Retired NFL Quarterback, Super Bowl Champion with St. Louis Rams
- Kyle Kingsbury – former Defensive tackle, a Mixed Martial Artist under contract as a light heavyweight in the Ultimate Fighting Championship
- Jason Kyle - Retired Long Snapper, Super Bowl Champion with New Orleans Saints
- Kit Lathrop Retired NFL Defensive lineman, Super Bowl Champion with Washington Redskins
- Benny Malone – Retired NFL Running back
- Isaiah Mustafa – former NFL Wide receiver, best known for his appearance on Ugly Betty and the Old Spice Advertisements
- Dimitri Nance - Retired NFL Running back, Super Bowl Champion with Green Bay Packers
- Craig Newsome - Retired NFL Cornerback, Super Bowl Champion with Green Bay Packers
- Brock Osweiler – Retired NFL Quarterback, Super Bowl Champion with the Denver Broncos
- Damarious Randall – former NFL Defensive back for the Las Vegas Raiders
- Gerald Riggs - Retired NFL Running back, Super Bowl Champion with Washington Redskins, 3-time Pro Bowler, and member of Atlanta Falcons Ring of Honor
- Grey Ruegamer - Retired Center, Super Bowl Champion with New England Patriots and New York Giants
- Phillipi Sparks – Retired NFL Defensive back
- Shawn Swayda – former NFL Defensive end
- Justin Tryon - former NFL Cornerback, Super Bowl Champion with New York Giants
- Jeff Van Raaphorst – Retired NFL Quarterback, Rose Bowl Hall of Fame
- Kyle Williams Retired NFL wide receiver, Super Bowl Champion with Denver Broncos
- Travis Williams - Retired NFL running back, 1-time Super Bowl/ NFL Champion with Green Bay Packers and member of Green Bay Packers Hall of Fame
- Darren Woodson – Retired NFL Safety, 3-time Super Bowl Champion, 5-time Pro Bowler and member of Dallas Cowboys Ring of Honor

== Future Big 12 opponents ==
On November 1, 2023, Arizona State's Big 12 opponents from 2024 through 2027 were revealed, with their rivalry game against Arizona being a protected annual game.

Future Arizona State Sun Devils Football Schedule
2026	2027
vs Colorado (11/7)	vs Arizona
vs Baylor (10/3)	vs BYU
vs Oklahoma State (11/21)	vs Utah
vs Kansas State (10/24)	vs Iowa State
at Arizona (11/28)	vs Cincinnati
at BYU (10/31)	at Colorado
at Texas Tech (10/17)	at TCU
at Kansas (9/19)	at Houston
at UCF (11/14)	at West Virginia

== Future non-conference opponents ==
Announced schedules as of October 13, 2026.

2027	2028	2029	2030	2031	2032	2033	2034
Akron (8/28)	Southern Miss (8/26)	Northern Arizona (9/1)		at Stanford (9/6)	Idaho State (9/4)		Northern Arizona (8/31)
Cal Poly (9/4)	Northern Arizona (9/2)	San Diego State (9/15)			Stanford (9/11)		
Texas A&M (9/11)	at San Diego State (9/9)						
at UNLV (9/18)							
