= 1977 Fiesta Bowl =

American college football game

- 7th Fiesta Bowl
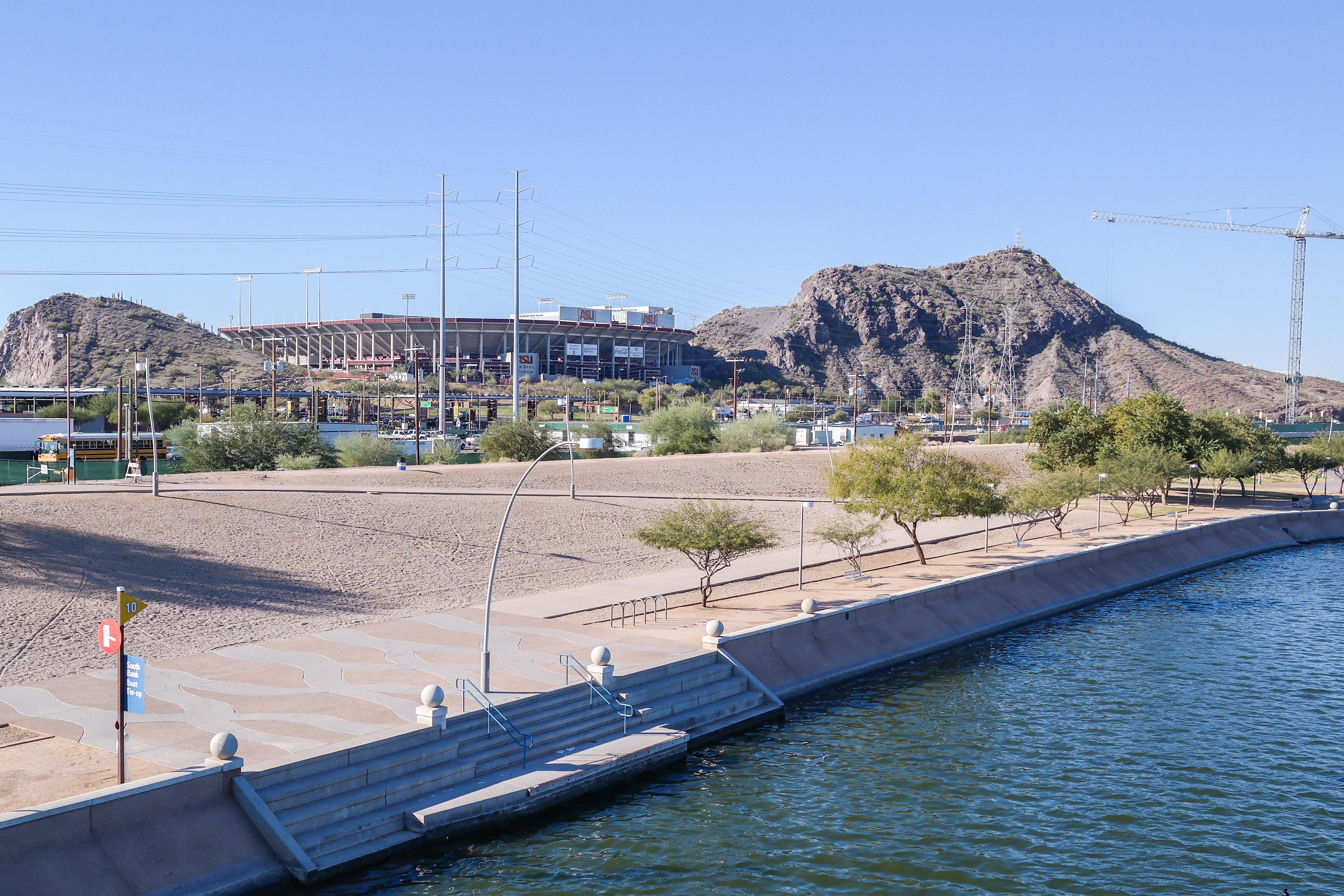
- Sun Devil Stadium in Tempe, Arizona, hosted the Fiesta Bowl.
Penn State Nittany Lions	Arizona State Sun Devils
(10–1)	(9–2)
Independent	WAC
42	30
Head coach: Joe Paterno	Head coach: Frank Kush
AP / Coaches; 8 / 7	AP / Coaches; 15 / 12
	1	2	3	4	Total
Penn State	14	3	7	18	42
Arizona State	0	14	0	16	30
- Date: December 25, 1977
- Season: 1977
- Stadium: Sun Devil Stadium
- Location: Tempe, Arizona
- MVP: Matt Millen (Penn State LB); Dennis Sproul (Arizona State QB)
- Favorite: Penn State by 7 points
- Referee: Vincent Buckley (SWC)
- Attendance: 57,727

United States TV coverage
- Network: CBS
- Announcers: Lindsey Nelson, Tom Matte

The 1977 Fiesta Bowl was the seventh edition of the college football bowl game, played at Sun Devil Stadium in Tempe, Arizona on Sunday, December 25. Part of the 1977–78 bowl game season, it matched the eighth-ranked Penn State Nittany Lions and the #15 Arizona State Sun Devils of the Western Athletic Conference (WAC). Favored Penn State took an early lead and won 42–30 on the Sun Devils' home field.

== Teams ==
=== Penn State ===
Penn State was ranked as high as fourth until a home loss to #16 Kentucky in early October, but then won seven straight. It was their first Fiesta Bowl appearance.

=== Arizona State ===
In the Sun Devils' final year in the WAC, they were co-champion for the seventh and last time, and appeared in their fifth Fiesta Bowl. They were invited after co-champion BYU backed out due to the bowl being slated to play on a Sunday. ASU's sole loss in the WAC was at Colorado State in a snowstorm.

== Game summary ==
The game kicked off on Christmas Day (Sunday) shortly after 1 p.m. MST, televised by CBS. There were no other bowl games on this day, and the NFL divisional playoffs were on a day either side of it; the AFC on Saturday, and the NFC on Monday.

Joe Lally blocked a punt and returned it 21 yards to give Penn State the lead early in the first quarter. Bob Torrey caught a touchdown pass from Chuck Fusina to make it 14–0. Arthur Lane caught a touchdown pass from Dennis Sproul to narrow it to 14–7. Bahr made it 17–7 with a field goal. Ron Washington caught a touchdown pass from Sproul to narrow it to 17–14 at halftime.

An 18-yard touchdown run by halfback Steve Geise made it 24–14 at the end of the third, and a three-yard run by fullback Matt Suhey increased the lead to seventeen points early in the fourth. Washington caught another touchdown pass from Sproul to narrow it to 31–21, but Bahr kicked another field goal to make it 34–21. Arizona State's George Perry ran in from a yard out to close the gap to 34–28, but Suhey's second touchdown run and a deliberate safety late in the game sealed the game for Penn State, who won their first-ever Fiesta Bowl.

=== Scoring ===
First quarter

- Penn State – Joe Lally 21-yard blocked punt return (Matt Bahr kick)
- Penn State – Bob Torrey 3-yard pass from Chuck Fusina (Bahr kick)

Second quarter

- Arizona State – Arthur Lane 11-yard pass from Dennis Sproul (Steve Hicks kick)
- Penn State – Bahr 22-yard field goal
- Arizona State – Ron Washington 13-yard pass from Sproul (Hicks kick)

Third quarter

- Penn State – Steve Geise 18-yard run (Bahr kick)

Fourth quarter

- Penn State – Matt Suhey 3-yard run (Bahr kick)
- Arizona State – Washington 30-yard pass from Sproul (Hicks kick)
- Penn State – Bahr 32-yard field goal
- Arizona State – George Perry 1-yard run (Hicks kick)
- Penn State – Suhey 3-yard run (Geise run)
- Arizona State – Safety, punter Scott Fitzkee ran out of end zone

== Statistics ==
Statistics	Penn State	ASU
First downs	18	29
Yards rushing	50–268	45–90
Yards passing	83	336
Passing	9–23–0	23–47–2
Return yards	91	1
Total Offense	73–442	92–427
Punts–Average	7–40.0	5–34.8
Fumbles–Lost	1–0	1–1
Turnovers	0	3
Penalties–Yards	12–126	5–33

== Aftermath ==
Penn State's next Fiesta Bowl was three years later; Arizona State returned in January 1983 as a member of the Pacific-10 Conference.
