= Stomp the Bus =

ASU Sun Devils football game entrance video

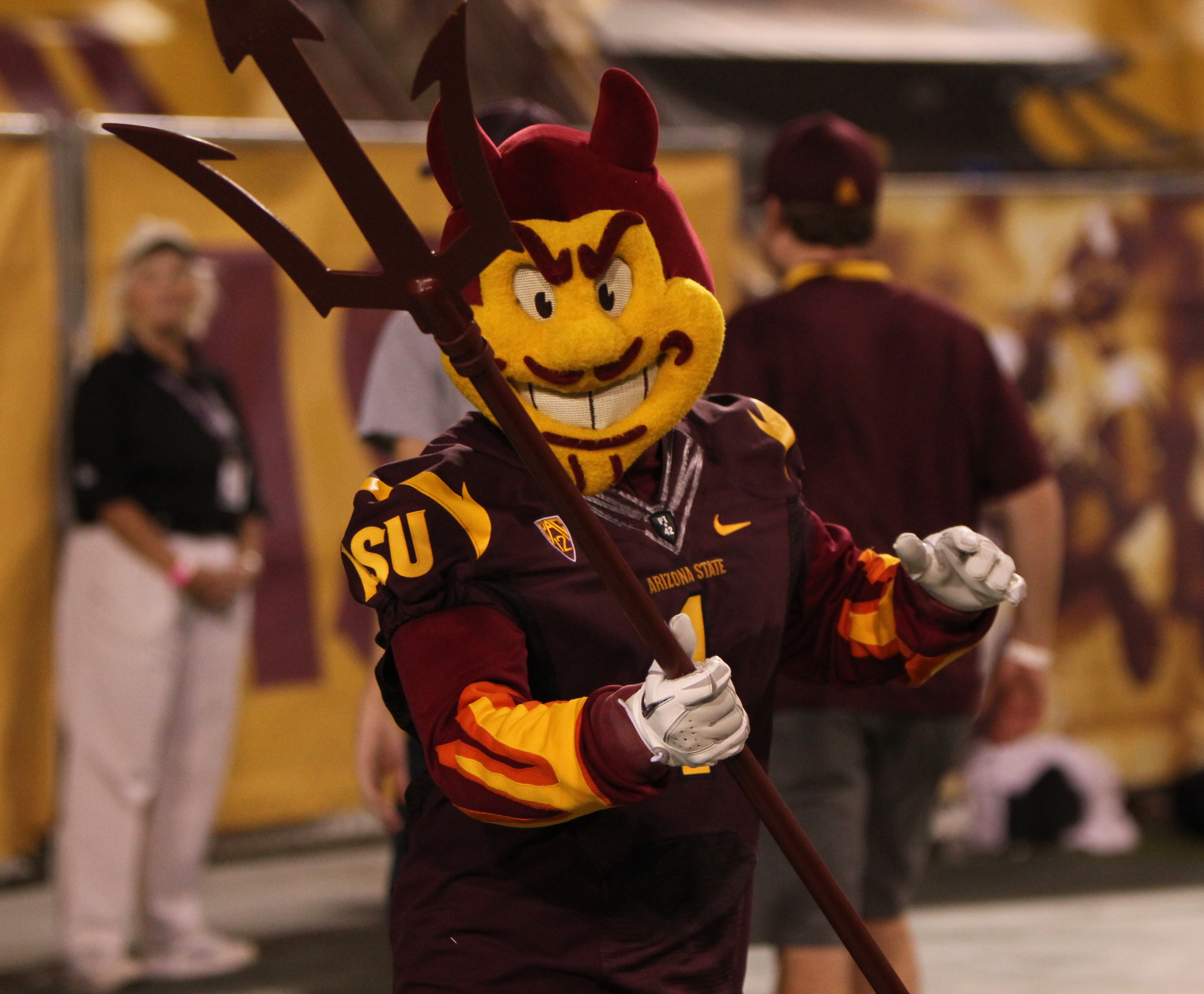
A giant Sparky is used in the video.

"Stomp the Bus" is the name given to the entrance video played before every Arizona State Sun Devils football game at Sun Devil Stadium. It was created in 2004 as a way to increase supporter participation and features a giant personification of Sparky the Sun Devil, Arizona State University's mascot, crushing the bus of the opposing team underfoot.

== Video ==
=== Original video ===
The original video starts with a solar flare from the Sun that launches towards Earth and lands in Arizona. A giant Sparky emerges from that flare. Sparky then walks across Arizona, passing known state landmarks such as the Grand Canyon and Camp Tontozona before arriving in Tempe, where the university is located. The scene then cuts to a view of Sun Devil Stadium with a bus covered in the opposing team's colors and logo (which change depending on the game day opponent). The giant stomps the bus underfoot before stepping into the stadium and spiking his trident into the field.

=== Updated video ===
The updated intro video from 2013 is still in use as of 2023. The video starts out the same as the original one; a solar flare from the sun launches toward Earth and lands in the middle of Arizona. As a result of the flare, the Ocotillo Power Plant malfunctions, and the power goes out. It then cuts to the location of the flare where a giant Sparky emerges from it. With his trident, Sparky creates a haboob and starts walking. He walks around the Phoenix Metro area with the haboob following him. He passes through Downtown Phoenix and walks over the traffic on the highway. Sparky then crosses Tempe Town Lake via the Mill Avenue bridges and walks around the Hayden Flour Mill. Sparky stomps the bus before stepping into the stadium and spiking his trident into the field.

== History ==
The original "Stomp the Bus" video was created in 2004 by True Story Films. The video became popular with ASU students and became a tradition prior to every Sun Devils home game. In 2011, "Stomp the Bus" was not played during the Sun Devils' season, which led to fans lamenting the apparent demise of this modern tradition. However the reason for the omission was that the video was being updated to improve the quality using new editing techniques and to include the student who played Sparky at the time. The playing of "Stomp the Bus" returned to Sun Devil Stadium the season after. The updated "Stomp the Bus" was well received and was the joint winner of the 2013 Rocky Mountain Emmy Awards for Best Editor – Short Form (Promos, PSAs, Commercials, Opens, etc.). In 2018, Sun Devils coach Rob Likens stated that he felt that seeing "Stomp the Bus" was so inspirational, he believed it might have inspired ASU's opposition.
