= Sun Devil Marching Band =

Marching band of Arizona State University

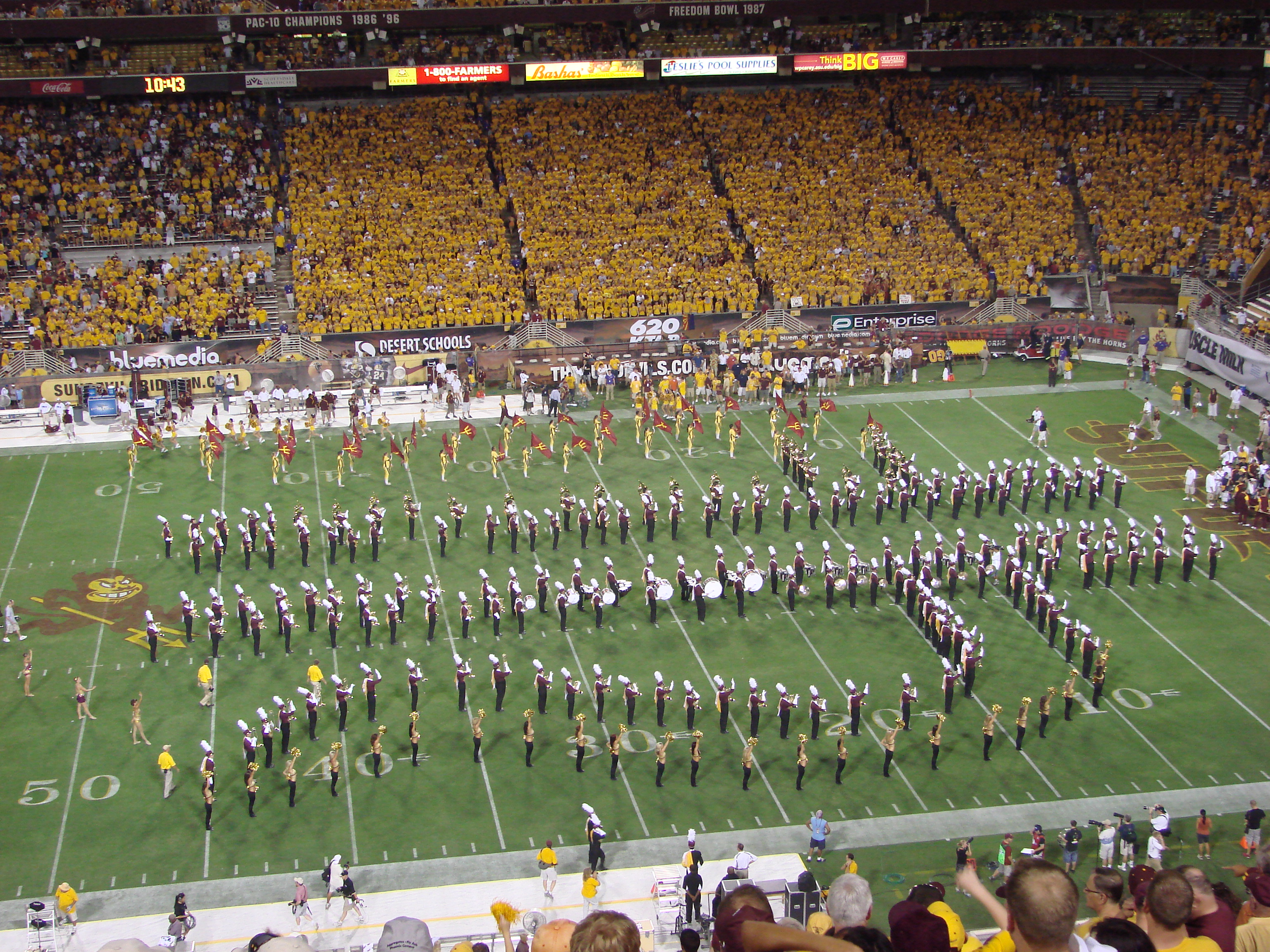
- 2007 SDMB Pitchfork Formation before Sun Devil Football Team's Introduction.
- Nickname: The Pride of the Southwest
- School: Arizona State University
- Location: Tempe, Arizona
- Conference: Big 12
- Founded: 1915
- Director: Mr. James G. "The Hammer" Hudson
- Members: 350+
- Practice field: ASU Band Field
- Fight song: "Maroon & Gold"
- Motto: "Expect Great Things."
- Website: sundevilband.asu.edu/bands/sun-devil-marching-band

The Sun Devil Marching Band (SDMB), also known as The Pride of the Southwest, is the athletic band of Arizona State University in Tempe, Arizona. The ASU Band program, which includes the Marching, Pep, and Dixieland bands, is a part of the Sun Devil Athletics department. The band is currently under the direction of Director of Athletic Bands James G. "The Hammer" Hudson, who took over the program in 2006. The Sun Devil Marching Band is a major ambassador for Arizona State University and the state of Arizona. Each year almost 500,000 people are entertained by the band, which plays at home football at Mountain America Stadium and as a pep band for basketball games at Desert Financial Arena, homecoming, bowl game parades, other community events in the Valley, across the country, and even abroad.

== History ==
On September 20, 1915, the Arizona Board of Education accepted and ratified the creation of the Tempe Bulldogs Marching Band under Lillian Williams (1915–1917). Under her guidance she furnished on her own the band's instruments, uniforms, and repertoire of standard classical music. The Bulldogs Marching Band though would be discontinued due to World War I. Williams last appearance was during 1947 concert as then Sun Devil Marching Band director Felix E. McKernan honored her. The Bulldogs Marching Band return in 1929 under short tenure of the direction of John Paul Jones. In transition under the direction of Carl G. Hoyer in 1937 the band's first bowl appearance for the Tournament of Roses Parade where the band won second prize. Though that year Hoyer would leave after then Arizona governor, Benjamin Baker Moeur, rejected his Arizona State Song for the state song of Arizona. During Dr. Robert G. Lyon five-year tenure was the addition of new parade and marching formations as well as swing music.

Under Felix E. McKernan direction saw the various changes taken place for the band and the school. In 1946, the school's, mascot was redesigned by former Disney illustrator, Bert Anthony, from the Bulldog to Sparky, the Sun Devil. McKernan made his marks in the band by composing the school's fight song Maroon & Gold, implementing script drill formations in pregame and halftime shows, holding auditions for instrumentation placing, offering scholarships to boost membership, recruiting high school band members, establishing Band Day, and formatting three weekly rehearsals. All of which laid the basis for band to grow rapidly. The band's growing reputation brought a lot of praise from directors across the nation such as Clarence Sawhill (1947–1952) of the USC Trojan Band proclaimed the band as "The Best Marching Band in the Southwest."

McKernan's successor, Harold C. Hines, as well added to McKernan's body of work by holding band camp a week before the Fall semester begins, additions to pregame pageantry, 1957 implementing fireworks, band's active role in Proposition 200 in 1958 for university status, and establishing the Alumni Band for Homecoming Games. August 1974 initiated a new period in the history of the Sun Devil Band program with the hiring of two new directors. The two men brought a new style of marching and philosophy to ASU's band program. Dr. Richard E. "Doc" Strange (1974–1999) became Director of Bands and brought (now) Dr. Robert C. "Coach" Fleming (1974–2002) as assistant director of Bands; this position was ultimately elevated to associate director of Bands, and is now designated Director of Athletic Bands. The Marching Band gained national recognition by performing at the 1987 and 1997 Rose Bowl games and Tournament of Roses Parades. Also to the band's credit are performances at Arizona Cardinals, San Francisco 49ers, the then Los Angeles Raiders and Los Angeles Rams professional football games, Phoenix Suns professional basketball games, SeaWorld, Knott's Berry Farm, Disneyland, Universal Studios, SeaWorld San Diego, on the deck of the Navy carrier USS Ranger (CV-61), and the 1990 Coca-Cola Bowl in Tokyo, Japan. Of note during the San Francisco 49er gig fans were impressed by the Sun Devil Marching Band rendition of George Cory's I Left My Heart in San Francisco the franchise insisted on the band making a 1963 recording and continued on using it at 49ers home games. On November 9, 1991, the Sun Devil Marching Band became the first Pac-10 marching band to receive the prestigious Sudler Trophy. This great honor is awarded (now biennially) to a college or university marching band that has demonstrated the highest musical standards and innovative marching routines and ideas. On multiple occasions, the band was invited by the NFL, to be part of the pregame and halftime festivities of Super Bowls XLII and XLIX in Glendale, Arizona.

=== Directors ===
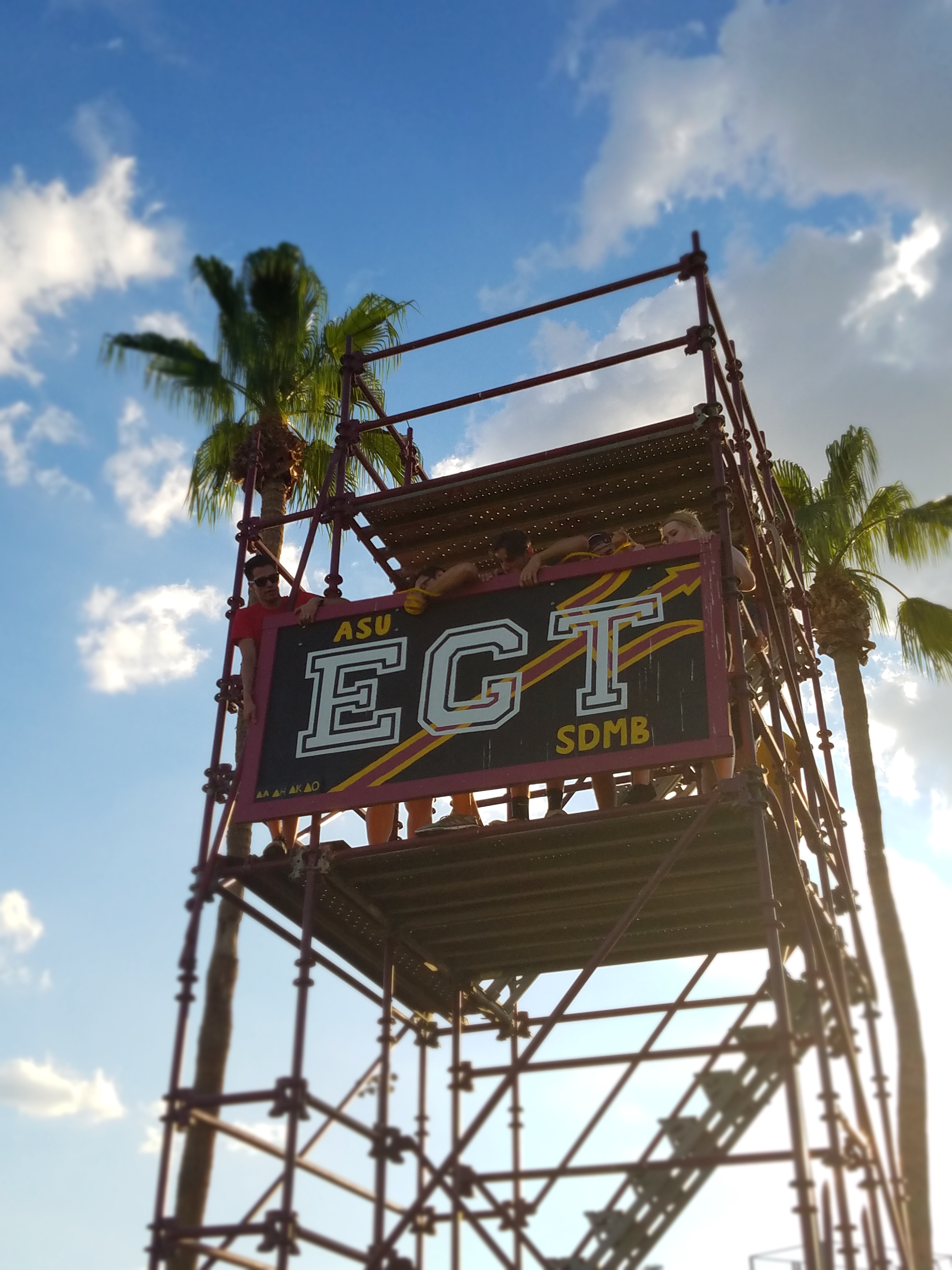
2015 EGT Director's Tower at the Band Field

- Lillian Williams, 1915–1917
- John Paul Jones, 1929–1930
- Carl G. Hoyer, 1931–1937
- Dr. Robert G. Lyon, 1938–1943
- Miles A. Dresskell, 1945
- Felix E. McKernan, 1946–1951
- Harold C. Hines, 1952–1965
- William H. Hill, 1966–1969
- William Mitchell 1969
- Dr. Kenneth O. Snapp and Robert W. Miller, 1970–1973
- Dr. Richard E. "Doc" Strange (1974–1999) and Dr. Robert C. "Coach" Fleming, 1974–2001
- Martin Province, 2002–2005
- James G. "The Hammer" Hudson, 2006–present

=== Drum Majors ===
Year	Drum Majors
1947	Pat Pouppirt, Ray Davis, Duke Miller (feature twirler)
1948	Ray Davis, John Large, Pat Pouppirt
1949	Ray Davis, John Large, Allegra Powell, Duke Miller (feature twirler)
1950	Duke Miller, Marian Flynn, Darlene Miller
1951	Duke Miller, Don Harrington, Bill Lester
1952	Bill Lester
1953	Roger Schartzer
1954	Roger Schartzer
1955	Roger Schartzer, Barbara Chausow, Cloin Watts, Duke Miller (feature twirler)
1957	Roger Schartzer
1962	George Gullet
1963	Bob Beardsley, Aretta Toops (feature twirler)
1966	George Cullet
1968	Joe Wilczewski
1970	Roger Crump
1973	Steve Banks
1974	Steve Banks
1975	Steve Banks
1976	Dave Henderson
1977	Dave Henderson
1978	Dave Henderson
1979	Dave Henderson
1980	Rob Verdi, Pam Miller
1981	Rob Verdi, Greg Boyer
1982	Rob Verdi, Greg Boyer
1983	Rob Verdi, Greg Boyer, Sue Danco
1984	Jon Gomez, Bill Humbert, Sue Danco
1985	Jon Gomez, Bill Humbert
1986	Jon Gomez, Mike Goodwin
1987	Jon Gomez, Mike Goodwin, Leo Werner
1988	Mike Goodwin, Leo Werner, Todd Sisk
1989	Leo Werner, Todd Sisk, Brigid O'Neill, Michael Thompson
1990	Todd Sisk, Brigid O'Neill, Michael Thompson
1991	Brigid O'Neill, Scott Rye, Michael Thompson
1992	Scott Rye, Brigid O'Neill, Susanne Butcher (Grattopp)
1993	Scott Rye, Susanne Butcher (Grattopp), Kristi Olsen (Thomas)
1994	Scott Rye, Susanne Butcher (Grattopp), Kristi Olsen (Thomas)
1995	Susanne Butcher (Grattopp), Kristi Olsen (Thomas), Michelle Butcher
1996	Ginger Lockhart, Michelle Butcher, Tawnya Milligan (Ortiz), Kristi Olsen (Thomas)
1997	Ginger Lockhart, Michelle Butcher, Cheryl Muller, Tawnya Milligan (Ortiz)
1998	Ginger Lockhart, Jaime Ali, Cheryl Muller
1999	Cheryl Muller, Tawnya Milligan (Ortiz), June Wagner
2000	June Wagner, Emily Davis
2001	Emily Davis, Nathan Johnston, Ty Largo, Tawnya Milligan (Ortiz)
2002	Tawnya Milligan (Ortiz), Shane Edrington, Nathan Johnston, Ty Largo
2003	Alex Raines, Shane Edrington, Nathan Johnston, Katie Mauel Thomas
2004	Alex Raines, Ivan Pour, Katie Mauel Thomas, TJ Witucky
2005	Ivan Pour, Liz Salazar, Tim Rall, TJ Witucky
2006	Chris Boccuzzo, DeAnna Uranga, Katie Rennell
2007	Chris Coughlin, DeAnna Uranga, Katie Rennell
2008	DeAnna Uranga, James Clemmons, Katie Rennell
2009	James Clemmons, Greg Mills, Jonathan Saturay
2010	James Clemmons, Greg Mills
2011	Patricia Estrada, Greg Rudolph, Robert Mattix, Greg Mills
2012	Joshua Beedle, Robert Mattix, Riley Molloy
2013	Joshua Beedle, Robert Mattix, Riley Molloy
2014	Joshua Beedle, Riley Molloy, Jenny Huettl
2015	Jenny Huettl, Rachel Quirbach, Kaylea K. Payne, Dale Ramirez
2016	Dale Ramirez, Rachel Quirbach, William Everett
2017	Dale Ramirez, William Everett, Austin Cahoon
2018	William Everett, Austin Cahoon
2019	Austin Cahoon, Laura Anderson, Gina Sleeper
2020	Laura Anderson, Gina Sleeper, Shawn Schive
2021	Laura Anderson, Shawn Schive, Giselle Coll
2022	Giselle Coll, Avantika Mitbander, Jackson Snyder
2023	Avantika Mitbander, Jackson Snyder, Bryn Hutton
2024	Jackson Snyder, Bryn Hutton, Cory Yeager
2025	Cory Yeager, Audrey Hutson, David Torres II
2026	Audrey Hutson, David Torres II, Xander McClinton

== Membership ==
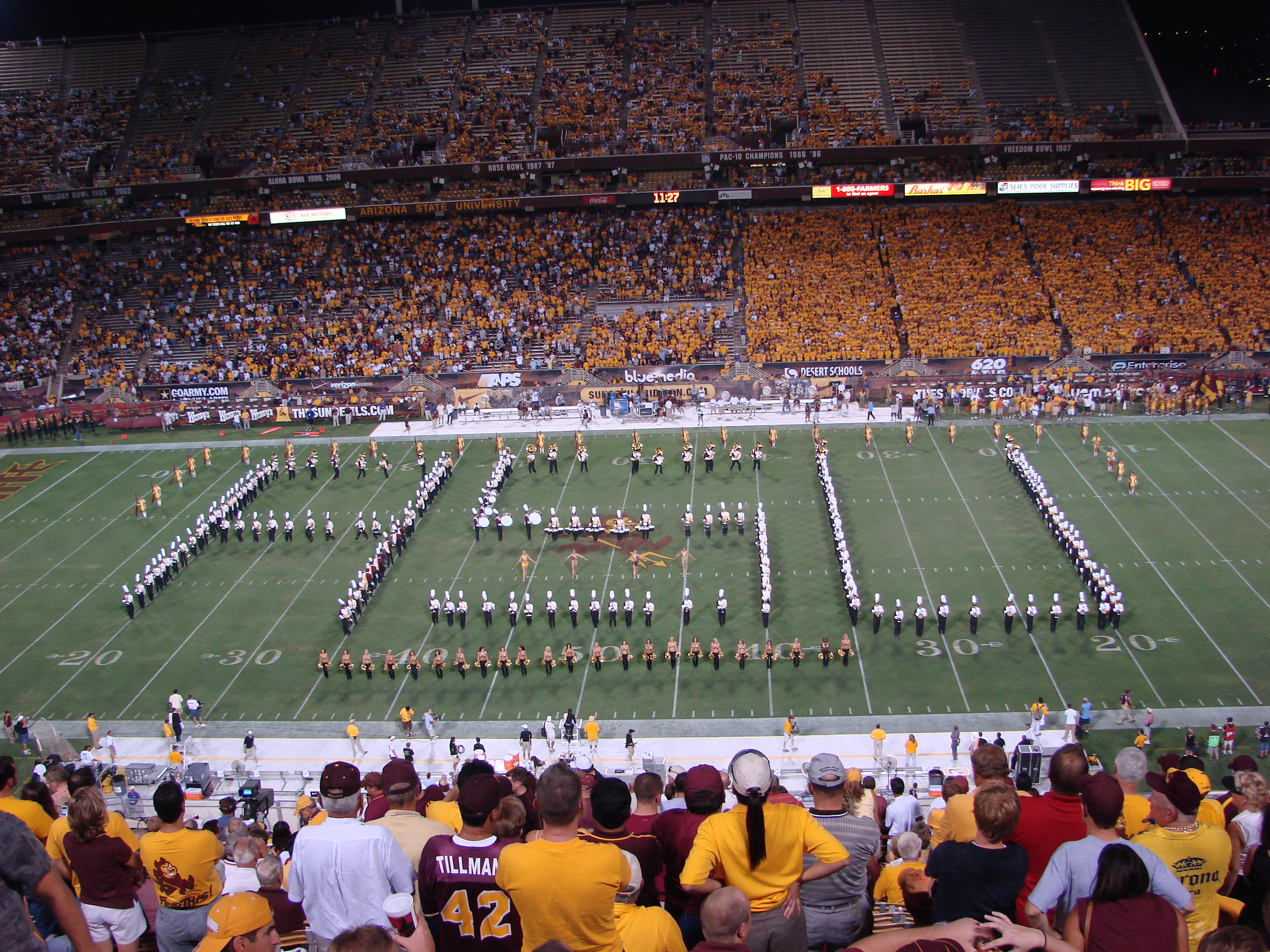
2007 SDMB spelling out ASU during Pregame.

Membership in the Sun Devil Marching Band is open to all university and community college students with previous high school or college marching band experience. In order to receive one credit hour for the class for full-time ASU students and non-degree community college students seeking the credit, enrollment in the class is required in order to obtain the credit hour. For individuals interested in participating in the Sun Devil Marching Band, but are not considered full-time degree seeking students at ASU are required to apply to ASU as non-degree students in order to register for the course. Currently an alternate “registration” route is offered for those who will only be registered for the marching band course(s), giving them the opportunity to participate in the Sun Devil Marching Band without incurring full tuition costs. Color Guard, Spirit Squad and Percussion have an additional class to add for one credit hour.

== Music ==
=== Fight songs ===
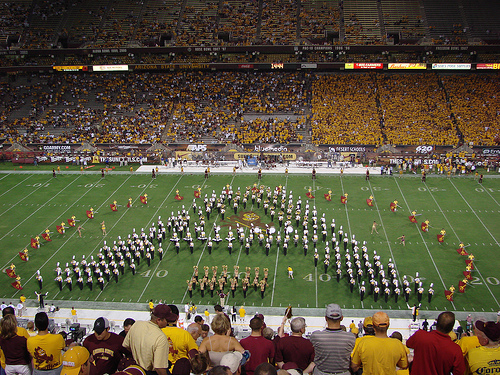
2007 SDMB Block A Formation during Pregame

"Maroon & Gold", ASU's fight song, is a familiar tune for Sun Devils all over the country, but is not the only "fight song" at ASU. In 1940, during World War II, Fred Waring composed a piece for the Arizona State College called "Fight, Arizona State (March On, Arizona)" which had become lost in history until 2015 when director James G. Hudson discovered it in the archives. He arranged it to be a part of the pregame show during the band program's 100th anniversary. Also in the 1940s, band director Albert Davis wrote "Go, Go Sun Devils" (more commonly known to the band as "The Al Davis Fight Song"); to this day, though Davis retired in the 1950s, the Sun Devil Marching Band continues to play the Al Davis Fight Song in their pregame performance as the Sun Devils come out of the tunnel onto the field, and occasionally make up humorous lyrics.

Another fight song that was written for the school but used sparingly was the song penned by former ASU President, G. Homer Durham. It was called "Sing a Song for ASU" and was last used at homecomings in the very early 1970s.

=== Stand tunes ===
The band not only performs during pregame and halftime of the football games, but also in the stands. The music in the stands is a combination of short and long tunes to help keep the energy in the stadium and keep the crowd excited. Songs used for stand tunes include popular past and contemporary songs from many genres of music. One such example is the excerpt from "The Imperial March (Darth Vader's Theme)" that the band plays when ASU's defense takes the field.

=== Special appearance performances ===
In the 2006 and 2007 seasons the band had opportunities of bringing in guest appearances of nationally and world-renowned recording artists for halftime performances.

- Horn-based soul band Tower of Power performing their hits You're Still a Young Man/ Diggin' on James Brown and Tower of PSo "So Very Hard to Go" / "What is Hip?" during November 18, 2006, game against UCLA Bruins
- Rendition of Juan Tizol's Caravan with The Boston Brass quintet during the October 13, 2007, game against Washington Huskies
- Musical legend and Rock and Roll Hall of Fame member Little Richard performing his hits Tutti Frutti; Jenny, Jenny; and Good Golly Miss Molly during Thanksgiving Day November 22, 2007, game against USC Trojans
- Journey founding member and lead guitarist Neal Schon accompanied by long-time keyboardist and backing vocalist Jonathan Cain performed the National Anthem before the September 28, 2013, game against USC Trojans
- Medley of Duke Ellington jazz standards with The Boston Brass during the football season opener against Northern Arizona University on September 3, 2016

== Arizona State University Band Day ==
The first Band Day was held on December 4, 1948, in conjunction with the 1948 Homecoming. Since then, the ASU Sun Devil Marching Band hosts its Band Day on the football team's road game or bye week at Sun Devil Stadium. High school bands from all over the state of Arizona come to play for judges and their peers. About 50+ high school bands perform, followed by the Sun Devil Marching Band. There is a morning block for one half of the bands to perform and a night block known as Sun Devil Showdown of the rest of the bands to perform which makes Band Day an all-day event, as well as making ASU Band Day the biggest marching band competition in the state. For the 2008 Band Day, the top high school band, Mesa Mountain View Toro Band won the first Dr. Robert "Coach" Fleming Outstanding Band Award in honor of the Sun Devil Marching Band's eleventh band director. Starting with the 2017 season, the ASU Sun Devil Marching Band will be hosting the ABODA State Marching Championships (DIV I, II, III, and IV) as an alternative to the traditional Band Day.

Recent ASU Band Day shows

Year	Show Theme	Featured Songs
2009	Queen	We Will Rock You, Bohemian Rhapsody, Fat Bottomed Girls, Somebody to Love, We Are the Champions, Bicycle Race
2010	Chase	Get it On
2011	Gershwin	Catfish Row, It Ain't Necessarily So, Summertime, Rhapsody in Blue
2012	Stan Kenton	Malagueña, La Suerte de Los Tontos, El Congo Valiente, Pegasus
2013	Styx and Stones	You Can't Always Get What You Want, Paint it Black, Mr. Roboto, Jumpin' Jack Flash, Wild Horses, Light Up, Too Much Time on My Hands, Come Sail Away
2014	Steely Dan	Aja, Josie, Peg, Reelin' in the Years
2015	Pictures of Rush	Pictures At An Exhibition, Limelight, YYZ, Tom Sawyer, Malaguena
2016	Piano Men	Toccata and Fugue in D Minor, Moonlight Sonata, Clair de Lune, The Entertainer, Piano Man, Fur Elise, Spanish Fantasy, Linus and Lucy, Two Part Invention in F Major, Crocodile Rock
2017	Summer of Love	Happy Together, Aquarius/Let the Sunshine In, I Can See for Miles
2018	Led Zeppelin	Immigrant Song, Black Dog, Stairway to Heaven, Kashmir
2019	Pictures of Rush	Pictures At An Exhibition, Limelight, YYZ, Tom Sawyer, Malaguena

== Pass in Review ==
Towards the end of every marching season the band performs Pregame and all Halftime shows headlining the "Pass in Review" concert which was previously held in Grady Gammage Memorial Auditorium. Digital and compact disc recordings of the Sun Devil Marching Band performance at Pass in Review are available through Sun Devil Marching Band Merchandise Website. Pass in Review also takes time to recognize upperclass band members who will not be returning the following year by allowing them to lead in a rendition of Maroon & Gold. Since 2010, Pass in Review has been held in Desert Financial Arena courtesy of Sun Devil Athletics Department.

== Trips ==
The band has traveled all over the original Pac-10. Prior to 2009, the band made an annual trip to Los Angeles, California, for either the USC or UCLA games. The band continues to travel bi-annually to Tucson, Arizona, to play against rival University of Arizona. They also follow the football team to any bowl game that they get invited to if funding is available. For the 2018 season, the band traveled to San Diego State University for the ASU vs. SDSU football game.

=== Bowl game appearances ===
- The 1940, 1941, 1997, 2004, 2014, 2017, 2019, and 2026 Sun Bowl in El Paso, Texas
- The 1950 and 1951 Salad Bowl in Phoenix, Arizona
- The 1970 and 2025 Peach Bowl in Atlanta, Georgia (now the Chick-fil-A Bowl)
- The 1971, 1972, 1973, 1975, 1977, and 1983 Fiesta Bowl in Tempe, Arizona (now in Glendale, Arizona)
- While the ASU Sun Devils were in the 1978 Garden State Bowl in East Rutherford, New Jersey, the band did not travel to the bowl
- The 1985, 2002, 2007, and 2013 Holiday Bowl in San Diego, California
- The 1987 Freedom Bowl in Anaheim, California (dissolved in 1995, conference alliance merged with the Holiday Bowl)
- The 1987 and 1997 Rose Bowl, the "Granddaddy of Them All" in Pasadena, California
- The 1990 Coca-Cola Bowl in Tokyo, Japan
- The 1999 and 2000 Aloha Bowl in ʻAiea, Hawaii
- The 2005 Insight Bowl and 2016 Cactus Bowl in Phoenix, Arizona (now the Cactus Bowl in Tempe, Arizona)
- The 2011, 2018, and 2021 Las Vegas Bowl in Las Vegas, Nevada
- The 2012 Fight Hunger Bowl in San Francisco, California

=== 2006 Sheraton Hawaii Bowl ===
On one occasion the band was unable to support the Sun Devil football team at the 2006 Sheraton Hawai’i Bowl in Honolulu (Halawa), Hawaii. The bowl payout for 2006 was $300,000 in addition the Pac-10 conference paid $389,000 (total $689,000) to offset expenses for the university. However, the university spent $824,000 total on the trip, losing $135,000 on the trip. In contrast the 1999 & 2000 Aloha Bowl paid $750,000 with no conference contribution, but with a higher ticket guarantee and only lost $70,000 on each trip. The bowl after decided to drop the Pac-10 Conference deal and made a current deal with Conference USA.

== Uniforms ==
=== Timeline ===
- 1915-1917 Cap and Coat
- 1929 All White Uniform, Military Boots, and Dark Cape
- 1938 Women's Bugle Corps wore Maroon and Gold Uniforms
- 1947 Red Coats, White Pants, Red Officer-Style Hats, and White Shoes
- 1954 Maroon Coats with Gold Overlay (Sparky embroidered center front), Maroon Pants with gold stripe, Maroon Shako hat with gold band top and bottom, Gold Plume, White shoes. Drum major white coat/gold overlay, white pants, white busby hat; majorettes white coat/maroon overlay, white skirt, white shako hat/maroon plume, white boots.
- 1963 Black wool coat and pants with a cream overlay, originally worn with a white fur busby and gold plume, later a black West Point shako hat with Gold sunburst front emblem, white plume, and white Gloves.
- 1972 The first custom-designed college band uniforms in the US, uniform was designed by the ASU College of Art and manufactured using a new wool/poly blend fabric designed specifically for use in hotter climates. Gold short-waist tail coat, front/back tails/sleeve cuffs appliqued and embroidered with a satin rising sun and Red, Yellow, Orange, and Purple satin flames with an emerging Maroon Sparky pitchfork; Gold wool/poly blend high-waisted pants with Maroon and White stripes down the outside of the leg; Gold fur 12" Busby with White Feather Plume, White Gloves, and White Shoes
- 1980s Various versions of gold pants and white/gold drum corps-style blouses with Maroon/White attached sashing, Maroon velour cowboy hats.
- 1986 Maroon pants with Gold/White button front jackets, with a shoulder-attached multicolored satin cape, the front in stripes of Maroon, Gold, Royal Blue, Turquoise, and Orange imitating the Arizona State Flag, the reverse solid gold satin. Maroon and white West Point hats with gold sunburst front emblem and White feather plume, white gloves, white shoes.
- 2005 Short lived Maroon pants with Gold Pitchforks on the sides and on the collar, Gold jacket with emblazoned Sparky logo on the chest, emblazoned ASU logos on the shoulders, custom Sun Devils logo on back, Maroon with emblazoned Gold flames hats, White feather plume, White gloves, and White shoes.

=== Current uniforms ===
In 2007, in its 60th season titled as the Sun Devil Marching Band the band received a very generous donation from donor Dr. Verde Dickey, funding the purchase of a new set of uniforms for the Sun Devil Marching Band. These new uniforms consist of white jackets fading into gold with a sunburst at the clip. In the middle of the sunburst is a mirror which represents the illumination of not only the sun, but also the bright personality a Sun Devil reflects. One arm of the jacket is maroon, while the other is gold. White gauntlets fastened with suns, and white gloves using Velcro finish the sleeves. A cape with the ASU lettering is added to the ensemble as a throwback to capes worn by the band in years past. The pants are purely black, rising to about chest level with the aid of suspenders. Black Viper marching shoes are used paired with equally black socks.

== Instrumentation ==
The marching band uses many different instruments of varying range and sound in its ranks. Providing a central point to tempo and beat by conducting on the sideline are the four Drum Majors. The hornline is divided into two major groups: woodwinds and brass. In addition to the hornline, the band also uses a percussion section that is divided into a marching battery of drums and a stationary sideline pit. With presence of a pit as part of the percussion section, it makes the Sun Devil Devil Marching Band one of the few college marching bands to field a pit. The other Pac-12 marching band currently fielding a pit is the Oregon Marching Band. The bottom bass drum in the battery section was known as "thumper". This bass was used for count offs for the band during march around the stadium, parades, and entering the field for halftime shows.

=== Percussion ===
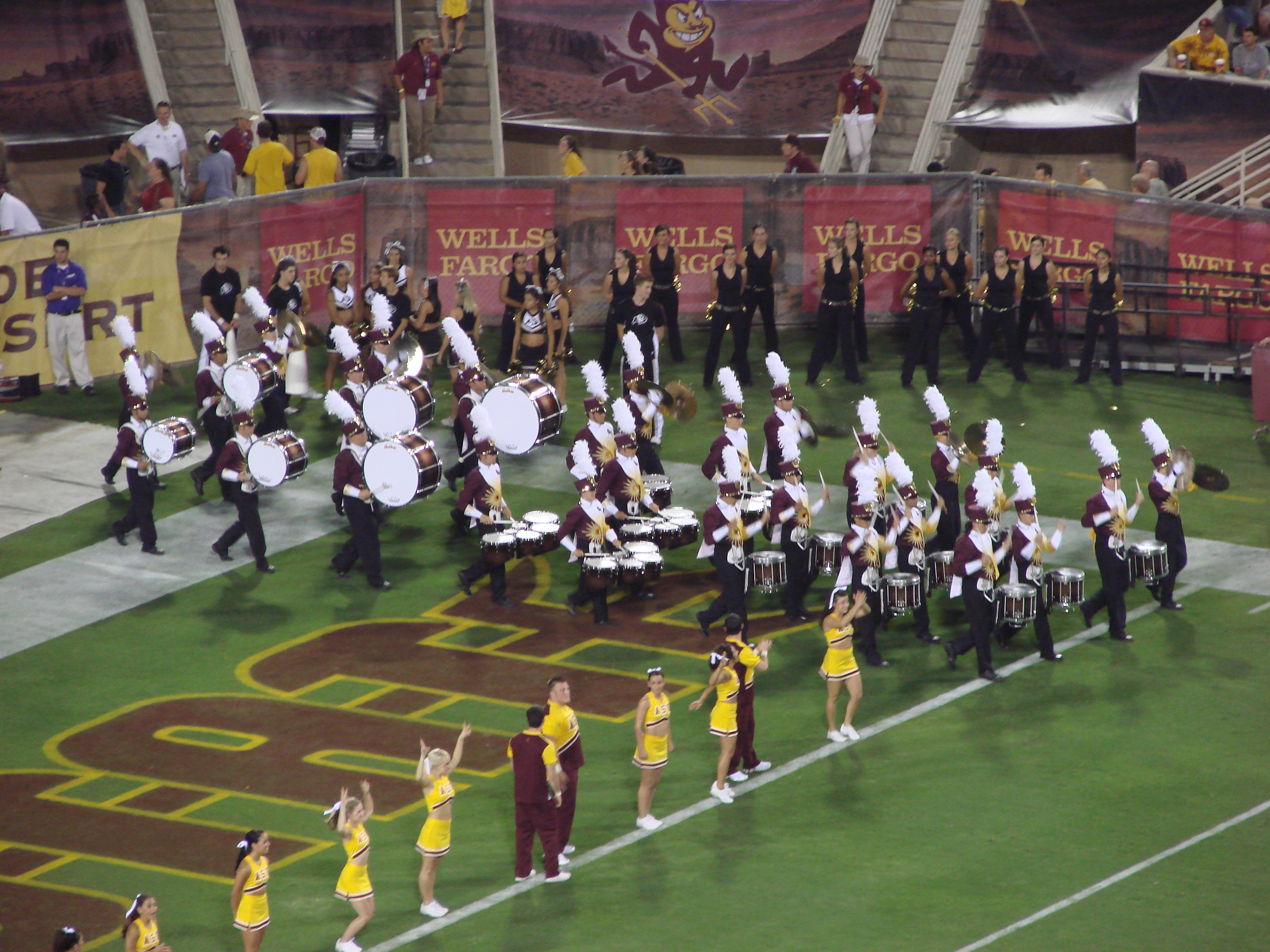
2007 SDMB Battery starting off Pregame with the drum cadence

In the past, outside of marching season, the drum line has branched out to other spectrums of the percussion world. They formed the ASU PASIC Drumline in 1995 with Percussive Arts Society International Convention being held locally and hosted by Dr. J.B. Smith, Professor of Music and the Coordinator of Percussion Studies in the School of Music at Arizona State University, at Phoenix Civic Plaza in Phoenix, Arizona. With the recent sensation of indoor percussion has had few lines part take in it. Initially with the 1998 ASU Spring Line and with the addition of the pit during the 2006 marching season the staff formed the 2007 ASU Winter Drumline. Competing locally in the Winter Guard Arizona circuit as well as nationally in Winter Guard International Percussion Regionals in Phoenix and Las Vegas in order to qualify in Winter Guard International Percussion World Championship in Dayton, Ohio. The winter line was on hold due to constraints since its inaugural line in 2007, but was re-established in 2013.

=== Auxiliary ===
Outside of the music producing sections of the band are the Sun Devil Spirit Squad/Dance Team, Featured Twirlers, and the Colorguard, all in charge of providing visually stimulating color and movement to the band in addition to the band's show forms and design.

==== Colorguard ====
Implemented in the 1975 season, known for the most visible aspects of the Sun Devil Marching Band, other than the Sousaphone Section. Presenting the visual story of the band's halftime performance through the use of flags, rifles, sabers, props, and dance. Colorguard members get a "corps-style" choreography and benefit from the instruction by some of the field's leaders. The colorguard program also features a World Class Winterguard in the off season and holds auditions in the fall for the next active winter season. The ASU Winterguard competes locally in the Winter Guard Arizona circuit as well as WGI regional events culminating at the Winter Guard International Championship held in Dayton, Ohio. In April, 2012, the ASU Winter Guard (competing under the name FeniX Independent) won the bronze medal in the Independent Open Class of the WGI World Championships. For the 2017 season, they competed in the Independent World Class and placed 14th in World Class Finals with a score of 83.050.

==== Feature Twirlers ====
The Feature Twirler position offers one of the most prestigious twirling opportunities in the country. Through competitive auditions for one-year appointments, nationally recognized twirlers are used prominently during all Sun Devil Marching Band shows. Handling of the baton instrument to create visual images, pictures, and patterns, executed with dexterity, smoothness, fluidity, and speed, both close in and around the body and by releasing the baton into the air.

==== Spirit Squad/ Dance Team ====
As a visible representative and ambassador of the university's athletics, the Spirit Squad/Dance Team devotes 15–20 hours every week to rehearsals, football games (home and away), Men's and Women's Basketball games, special appearances, clinics, competitions, and various special events. The creation of the Spirit Squad came in Spring 2008 with the university's decision to disband the cheerleading squad and merge the cheer and dance team, under the direction of the Athletic Band Director. Male members of the Spirit Squad are known as Sparky's Crew, assisting Sparky the Sun Devil and Spirit Squad in cheers with megaphones, banners, and signs.

The 2012-2013 ASU Dance Team, under the direction of April Hoffman, competed in the UDA College Nationals, in Orlando, Florida, placing second in Division IA Jazz, and 5th in Division IA Hip-Hop. In addition, our dance team also represented USA in 2013 and 2017, competing and placing gold in the 2013 ICU World Cheerleading Championship in Team Cheer Jazz.

== Pep band ==
Members of the Sun Devil Marching Band are allowed to participate in the ASU Pep Band, which plays at all home Men's and Women's Basketball games at Wells Fargo Arena and travels annually to Seattle for the Women's Pac-12 tournament and Las Vegas for the Men's Pac-12 tournament. However, starting with the 2018–2019 season, both tournaments will be held in Las Vegas, Nevada, at the newly established T-Mobile Arena. They also follow the teams to any NCAA and NIT tournaments they qualify for.

== Dixieland Bands ==
In addition the Dixie Devils and Sparky's Sliders are the newest members of the ASU Athletic Band family. Both groups, under the direction of world renown and ASU School of Music Professor Sam Pilafian. Dixie Devils is a traditional six-piece Dixieland Combo that specializes in Early Jazz, Ragtime, and Swing Music, focusing primarily on the music of Louis Armstrong, Bix Biederbecke, King Oliver, and Freddie Keppard. The Dixie Devils can be seen outside around Sun Devil Stadium at all Sun Devil home football games, select basketball and baseball games and are available for all functions, Commercial or Private. Sparky's Sliders is an all Trombone Dixie Band that can be seen inside Wells Fargo Arena for Devil's Lair tailgating entertaining fans before games.
