= Maroon & Gold =

ASU fight song

"Maroon & Gold" is the official fight song of Arizona State University. It was composed by former Director of Sun Devil Marching Band, Felix E. McKernan, in 1948.

== Alma mater ==
"Alma Mater" was composed by former Music Professor and Director of Bulldog Marching Band, Miles A. Dresskell, in 1937. Current version of the Alma Mater was composed by Hazel Quaid, Dixie Gammage, and Ernest Jerome Hopkins.

== Lyrics ==
The wording of the song is as follows.

Fight, Devils down the field
Fight with your might and don’t ever yield
Long may our colors outshine the others
Echo from the buttes,
Give’em hell Devils!
Cheer, cheer for ASU
Fight for the Old Maroon
For its hail, hail, the gang’s all here
And it’s onward to victory.

Fight, Devils down the field
Fight with your might and don’t ever yield
Long may our colors outshine the others
Echo from the buttes,
Give’em hell Devils!
Cheer, cheer for ASU
Fight for the Old Maroon
For it’s hail, hail, the gang’s all here
And it’s onward to victory!

== See also ==
- Sun Devil Marching Band
