= Bob Torrey (running back) =

American football player (born 1957)

No. 39, 38
- Position: Running back

Personal information
- Born: January 30, 1957 (age 69); Ceres, New York, U.S.
- Listed height: 6 ft 4 in (1.93 m)
- Listed weight: 231 lb (105 kg)

Career information
- High school: Bolivar (NY) Richburg
- College: Penn State
- NFL draft: 1979: 6th round, 145th overall pick

Career history
- New York Giants (1979); Miami Dolphins (1979); Philadelphia Eagles (1980)

Career NFL statistics
- Rushing yards: 61
- Rushing average: 4.7
- Touchdowns: 1
- Stats at Pro Football Reference

Robert Douglas Torrey (born January 30, 1957) is an American former professional football player who was a running back in the National Football League (NFL). He played college football for the Penn State Nittany Lions and was selected in the sixth round of the 1979 NFL draft. Torrey played for the New York Giants, the Miami Dolphins, and the Philadelphia Eagles.

At the 7th annual Fiesta Bowl in 1977 (PSU 42 ASU 30) Bob Torrey ran for 107 yards and a score on just nine carries. Bob scored on a 3-yard pass reception from Chuck Fusina. He attended high school at Bolivar Central School in Bolivar, NY, where he led the team to a 9–0 season in 1974 under coach Bob Dunsmore.
