= Dennis Sproul =

American football player (born 1956)

No. 16
- Position: Quarterback

Personal information
- Born: July 17, 1956 (age 70); Downey, California, U.S.
- Listed height: 6 ft 2 in (1.88 m)
- Listed weight: 210 lb (95 kg)

Career information
- High school: Hacienda Heights (CA)
- College: Arizona State
- NFL draft: 1978: 8th round, 200th overall pick

Career history
- Green Bay Packers (1978)

Career NFL statistics
- Passing attempts: 13
- Completions: 5
- Passing yards: 87
- Stats at Pro Football Reference

Dennis Sproul (born July 17, 1956) is an American former professional football player who was a quarterback in the National Football League (NFL). He played college football for the Arizona State Sun Devils and was selected by the Green Bay Packers in the eighth round of the 1978 NFL draft and played that season with the team.
