= Sparky the Sun Devil =

Arizona State University mascot

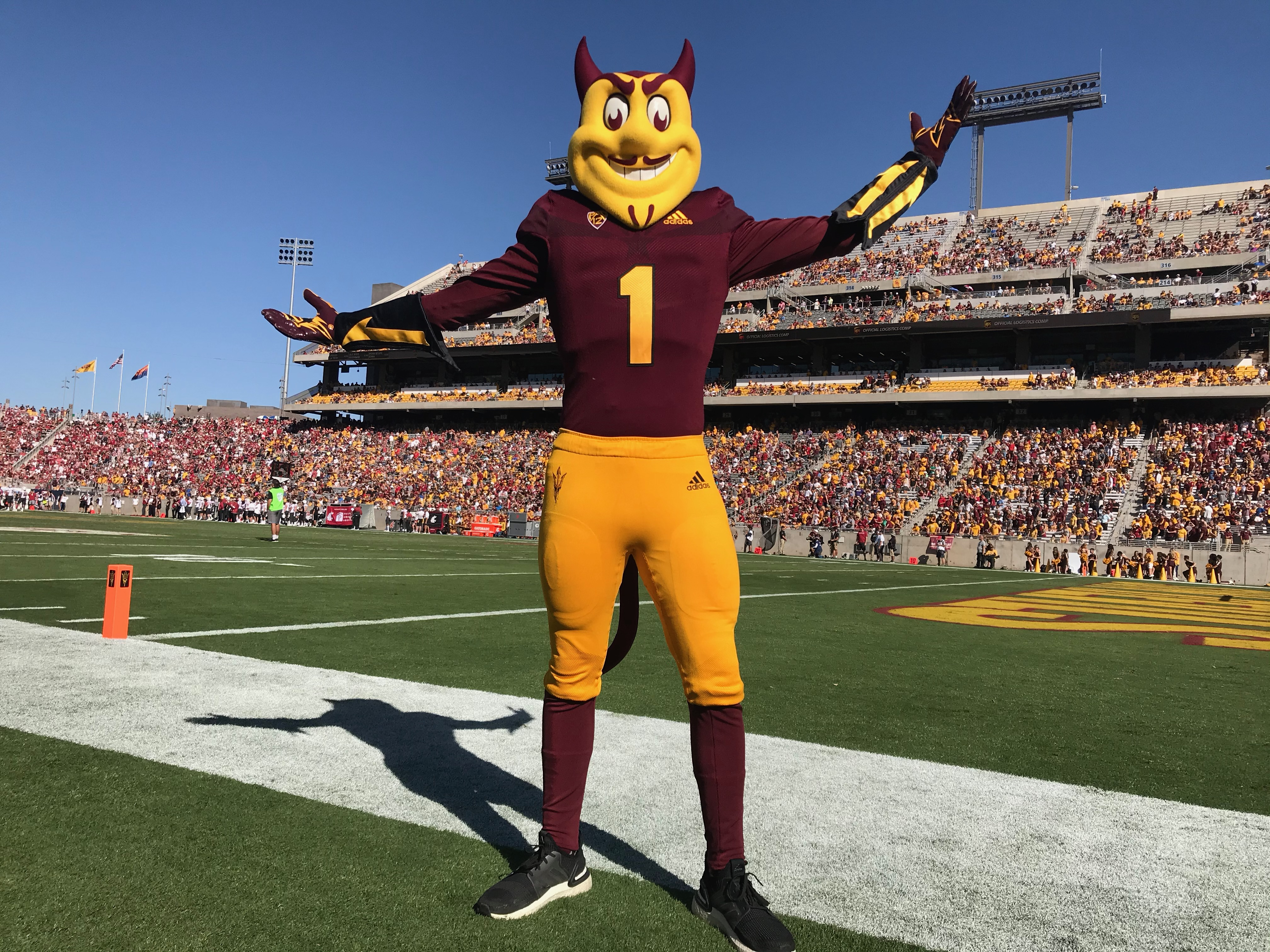
- Sparky the Sun Devil performing in 2019
- University: Arizona State University
- Conference: Big 12
- First seen: September 21, 1951
- Website: twitter.com/SparkySunDevil

Sparky the Sun Devil is the official mascot of Arizona State University. Originally the ASU athletic teams' mascot was an owl, then became a "Normal" (because ASU was founded as a normal school). It was later changed to a bulldog in an attempt to make the school – Arizona State Teacher's College at the time – appear more in line with Yale and other universities that held a higher level of respect. The State Press, the student newspaper, ran frequent appeals during the fall of 1946, urging the Bulldog to be replaced by the new Sun Devil. On November 8, 1946, the student body voted 819 to 196 to make the change. On November 20, as reported by the Arizona Republic, the student council made it official. The following day, the first Arizona State team played as the Sun Devils. Two years later, Stanford Alum and Disney illustrator Berk Anthony designed "Sparky", a devil holding a trident (colloquially referred to as a pitchfork). Anthony is rumored to have based Sparky's facial features on that of his former boss, Walt Disney.

== Trademark ==
In the 1970s and early 1980s, Orange Julius beverage stands used the image of a devil with a pitchfork around an orange. The company later dropped the logo after threats of a lawsuit from the alumni association.

== Redesign ==
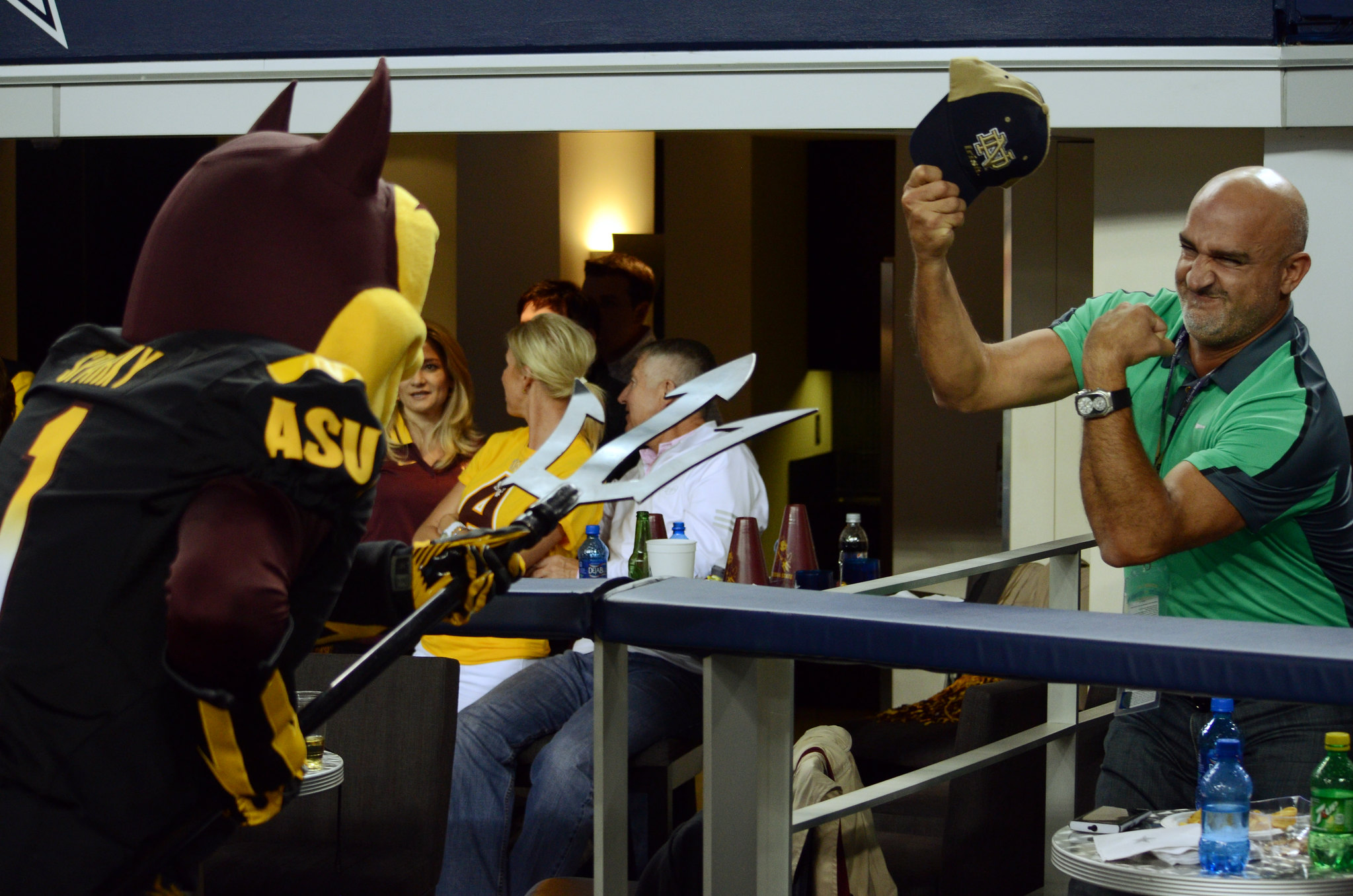
Sparky the Sun Devil spars with a Notre Dame fan at their matchup at Cowboys Stadium

On March 1, 2013, Arizona State announced they were joining forces with the Walt Disney Company to redesign the mascot costume, as part of an effort to modernize the character, and planned to use the character in comic books, children books and animated features. The school also announced that they planned to continue using the iconic mark in various ways, including marketing and selling apparel alongside the new version of the character. This change was met with backlash from students, alumni, and fans. Arizona State University President Michael Crow indicated that officials were meeting with student leaders to discuss the issue; afterwards, Sparky's new look was scrapped on March 19, 2013. The school later announced that it had created a program for members of the ASU community to vote on Sparky's redesign in which users were able to choose between different features for the mascot. The most popular features were used for a new look that will be fully unveiled at the first football game in the fall of 2013. His updated look includes many of the same features of the older mascot but with different material that is easier to clean. Unlike the more cartoon-like Sparky designed with Disney, the newest version is viewed as more representative of the historical drawing. It received 55% of the vote among 4 choices. A giant Sparky is used in the "Stomp the Bus" entrance video for the Sun Devils football team.

=== "Pitchfork" and traditions ===
The hand gesture "The Pitchfork", which is widely used by those associated with Arizona State, is an extension of the trident that Sparky carries during football games. On football game days, Sparky will do push-ups after every ASU score to match the total of points they have in the game. When ASU travels on the road for football, Sparky will do push-ups on his pitchfork supported by the ASU Spirit Squad.

== Controversy ==
In September 2015, the Arizona State Sun Devils football team played a game against the University of New Mexico. At halftime, there was a ceremony that included many city officials for a ceremony to go along with the City of Tempe Night at the stadium. As the city officials were lined up on the sideline of the field, Sparky leaped on councilman David Schapira's back. What Sparky did not know was that Schapira was still recovering from a back operation from July. Schapira filed a claim against the university over the injuries he suffered during the halftime ceremony. Schapira filed a claim for $120,000: $96,146 in damages for himself and $27,000 to reimburse Tempe. In May 2016, the two parties settled for $76,234.
