= Rhiannon Skye Tafoya =

Native American artist from North Carolina, born 1989

- Born: 1989 (age 36–37)
- Citizenship: Eastern Band of Cherokee Indians and American
- Known for: visual arts
- Website: skyetafoya.com

Rhiannon Skye Tafoya (born 1989) is a Native American printmaker known for her serigraphy, woven paper, and artist's books. She lives in Cherokee, North Carolina.

== Background ==
Rhiannon Skye Tafoya was born in 1989. She is a citizen of the Eastern Band of Cherokee Indians and a descendant of Santa Clara Pueblo. Relatives on both sides of her family were basket weavers.

== Education ==
Tafoya earned her BFA degree at Institute of American Indian Arts in Santa Fe, New Mexico, and her MFA at the Pacific Northwest College of Art in Portland, Oregon.

== Art career ==
In 2019, she had an artist's residency at the Women's Studio Workshop.

In 2022 Self Help Graphics & Art produced a serigraph entitled Relatives.

== Exhibitions ==
In 2021, her work was included in the exhibition A Living Language: Cherokee Syllabary and Contemporary Art at the Museum of the Cherokee People and the Asheville Art Museum. She has also exhibited at Hecho a Mano in Santa Fe, 516 Arts in Albuquerque, the IAIA Museum of Contemporary Native Arts in Santa Fe, and the International Print Center in New York.

== Collections ==
Her work is in several public collections. These include:

- Bainbridge Island Museum of Art, Bainbridge Island, Washington
- Charles Trumbull Hayden Library
- Kohler Art Library, University of Wisconsin–Madison
- Metropolitan Museum of Art, New York
- National Museum of Women in the Arts, Washington, DC
- U.S. Library of Congress, Washington, DC
