= Charles Trumbull Hayden Library =

Library at Arizona State University in Tempe, Arizona

Coordinates: 33°25′8.5″N 111°56′4.5″W

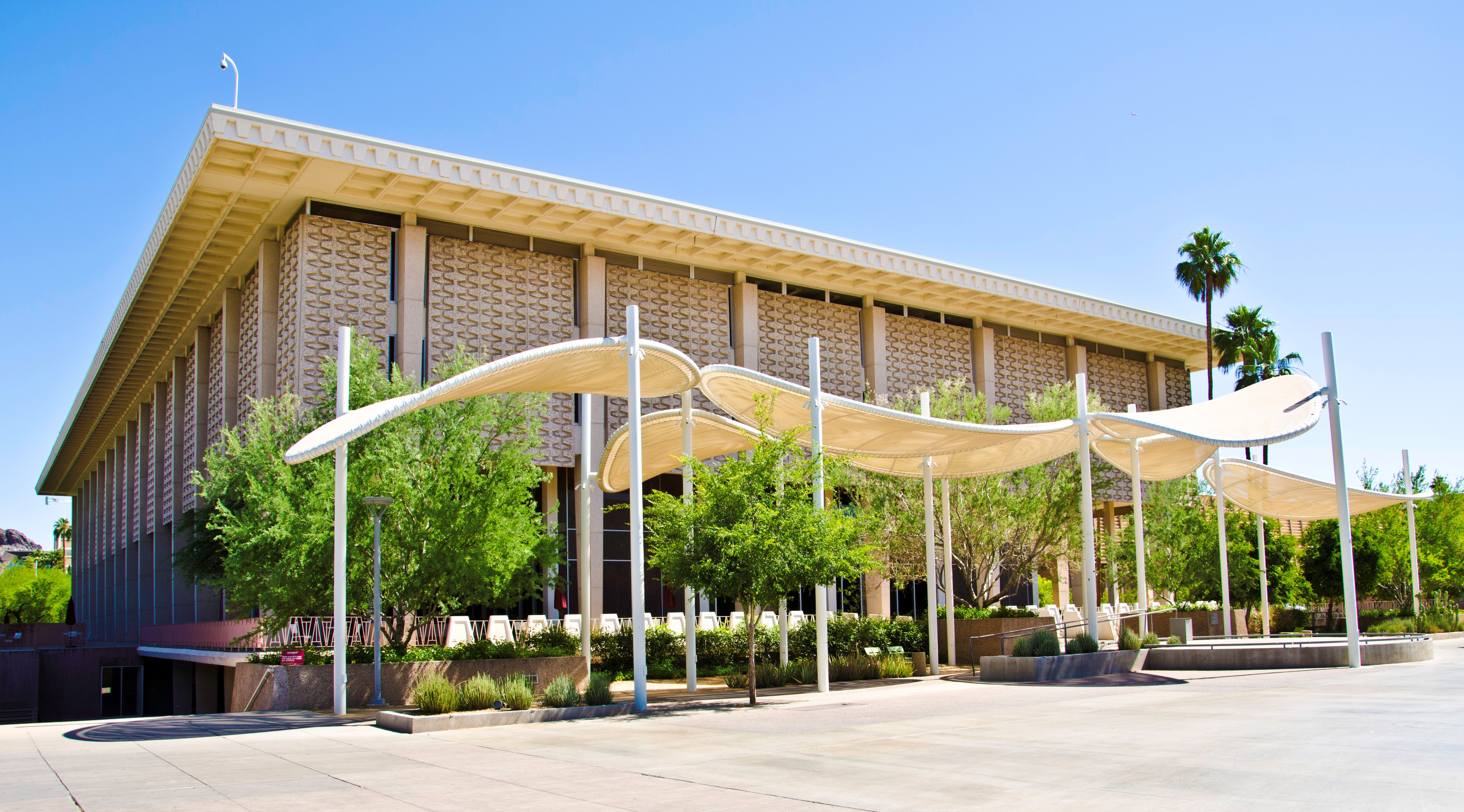
- The Charles Trumbull Hayden Library in 2012

General information
- Architectural style: Modernism/Post-Modernism
- Location: Arizona State University, Tempe, Arizona, 300 E Orange Street
- Groundbreaking: 1965
- Opened: 1966
- Renovated: 1989, 2020
- Owner: Arizona State University

Design and construction
- Architects: Frederick Weaver and Richard Drover
- Architecture firm: Weaver & Drover
- Main contractor: TGK Construction Company Inc.

Renovating team
- Architect: Ayers Saint Gross
- Main contractor: Holder Construction

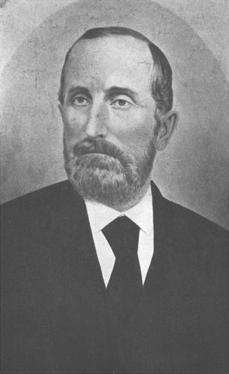
Charles Trumbull Hayden, for whom the library was named

Charles Trumbull Hayden Library, at 300 East Orange Mall on the Tempe campus of Arizona State University, was built in 1966 and was named for Charles Trumbull Hayden, founder of Tempe and the first president of the board of the Arizona Territorial Normal School, ASU's predecessor. Hayden Library is the largest facility on ASU's Tempe campus, and now houses millions of books and other research materials in the humanities and social sciences, including humanities in education. Over the course of the 20th century, Hayden Library has undergone expansions and renovations, including the addition of an underground plaza and entrance in 1989, designed by the original architects. A renovation was completed in 2020 by Ayers Saint Gross.

== History ==
The history of Arizona State University's largest library and the City of Tempe accredits one significant figure for whom this library has derived its name, Charles Trumbull Hayden. He used his background in developing, and founded the City of Tempe, but also paired the existing businesses of the "cable ferry, grist mill and general store" during a population boom within the territories of Arizona. He decided it would be profitable to establish an educational institution during this time. In 1885, the Territorial Normal School was founded with support from the local community. Hayden was able to purchase 20 acres of land to begin constructing a four room schoolhouse. This land was a contribution from George and Martha Wilson for only five hundred dollars. This has led to what is now established as Arizona State University and is reputable as one of the biggest public institutions within the United States. Towards the later half of 1966, over 600,000 volumes were transported from the existing Matthews Library – now the A. J. Matthews Center – to the new Hayden Library.

In 1989, the architecture firm Fredrick Weaver and Richard Drover that designed the library, designed an expansion that would later include an underground foyer and entrance to the five story library. The Hayden Library is ASU's largest library, holding over five million volumes.

Special collections include the Arizona Collection, the Labriola National Indian Data Center, the Arizona Historical Foundation, the Chicano Research Collection and the University Archives. Aside from its primary function as a library and study space, Hayden also is a meeting space,

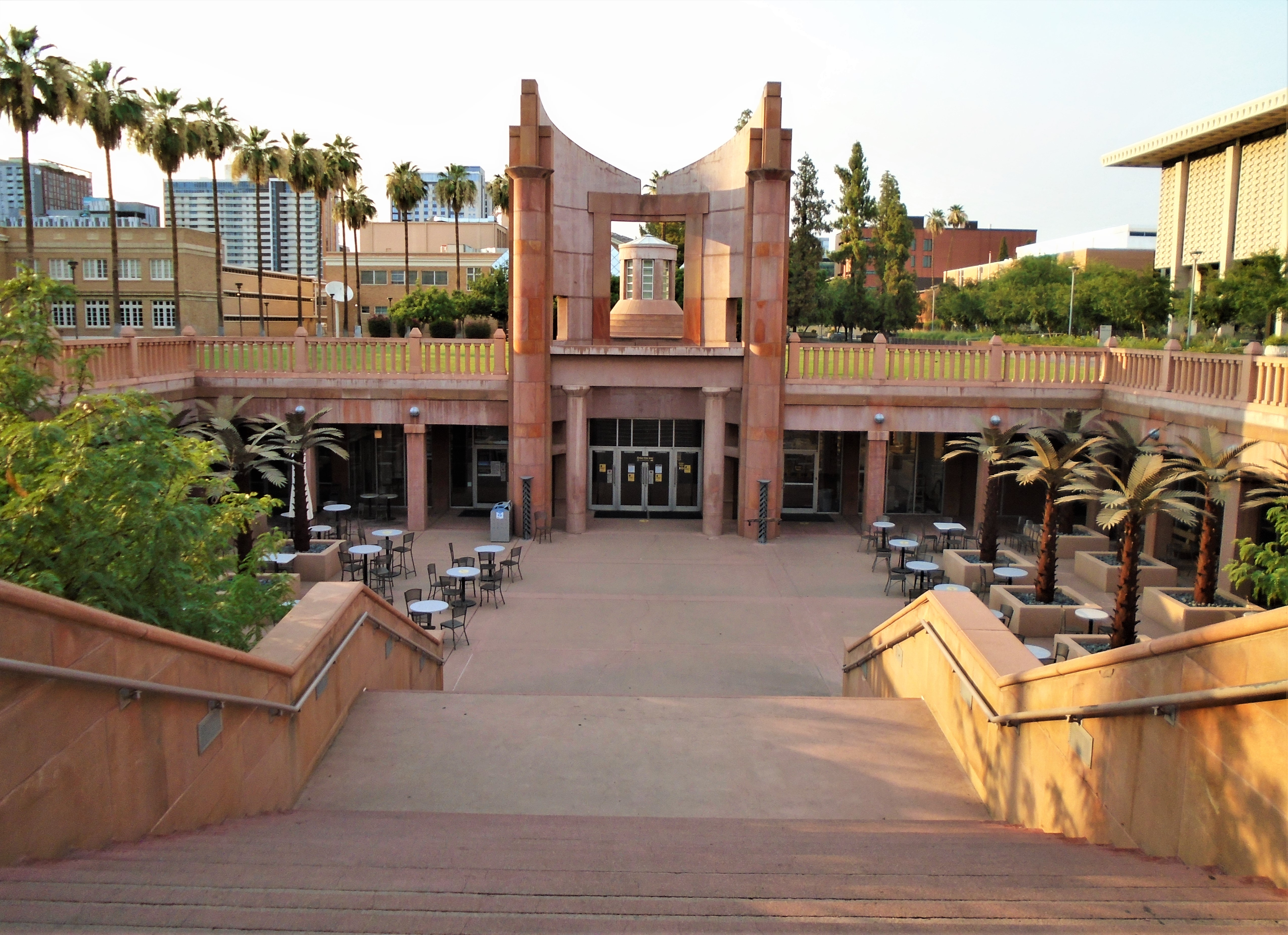
The staircase leading down to the library's underground plaza and entrance

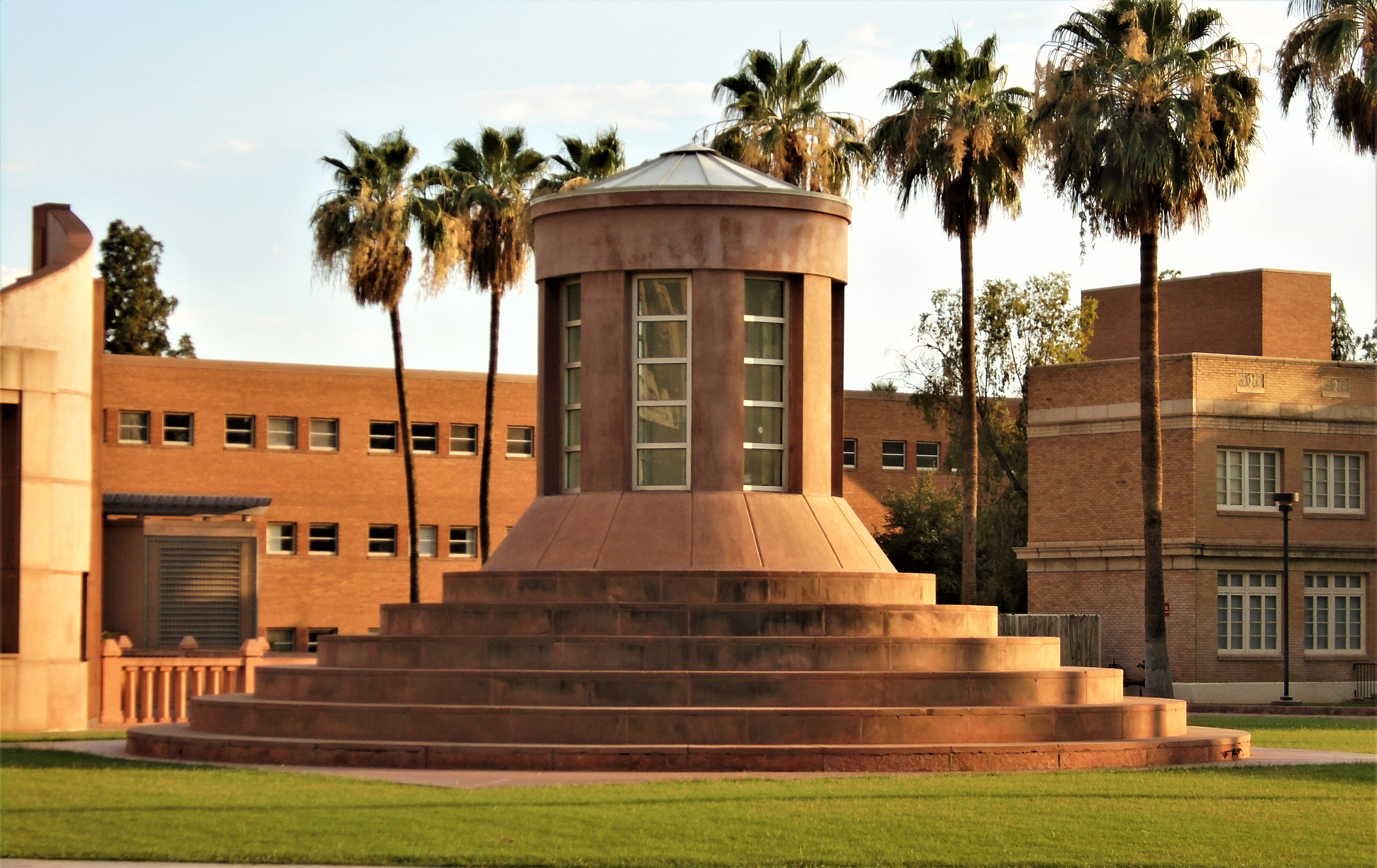
The "Beacon of Knowledge" (colloquially referred to by students as the "Nipple of Knowledge") on the Hayden Lawn is illuminated at night by the light from the library below it.

== Timeline ==
1965: The architecture firm of Weaver & Drover (Frederick Weaver and Richard Drover) designed the Hayden Library for Arizona State University and began building the library in 1965. TGK Construction Company Inc. was the contractor.

1966: Once the building was completed, ASU transferred over 600,000 books, articles, and journals to Hayden Library in August 1966. In November 1966, the Hayden Library had a dedication event at which the then Senator Carl T. Hayden spoke about his father’s (Charles Trumbull Hayden) contributions to Tempe, which is how the Hayden Library got its name.

1968: A plan to create a space within the library dedicated to rare books was in the works by 1968. The intent was for these rare book rooms to house special collections, correlative artifacts, and manuscripts, such as the original illustration of Alice's Adventures in Wonderland, by Salvador Dalí. These rooms were then opened in 1969.

1969: Historia Naturae, by Juan Eusebio Nieremberg, was the one millionth volume that arrived at the Library. It was acquired during the fiscal year 1968–69.

1989: Arizona State was rapidly growing, therefore the library had to expand in order to support the students. In 1989, an artist drew a rendering, depicting the new renovation of Hayden’s underground entrance and concourse level in order to expand the library.

1991: Within the Special Collections section of the Hayden Library, The Gutenberg Bible leaf was gifted to the library from community and university donors.

1993: April 1, 1993, Frank and Mary Labriola gifted the library with the Labriola National American Indian Data Center.

2016: With new technology, ASU wanted to integrate Makerspace, a learning and research technology, into the library for students and staff to have full access to. Makerspace offers tools and resources to faculty, staff and students in order to create and collaborate.

2020: In the midst of the Coronavirus pandemic, ASU hired Ayers Saint Gross architecture firm and completed the renovation of Hayden Library.

== Sustainability ==
The new Hayden Library was designed to support the campus's 70,000 students in an environmentally friendly way. The reinvention allowed for the opaque portions of the building envelope and structural systems to remain in place. The material was based on recycled content that is available regionally. Certain changes in the HVAC system and window glazing improved the energy expenses from the previous design by 47%. Water conservation was also a main focus and with the addition of efficient plumbing fixtures, the amount of potable water usage was expected to decrease 37%. The exterior design was also taken into consideration and with adjustments in irrigation and the use of more native plants, potable water consumption was measured to decrease by 80%. The new reinvention of the Hayden Library is on track to receive LEED Platinum certification. The reinvention of the Hayden Library and plans for environmentally friendly features allows for the character of the building to reconnect itself with the upcoming future for Arizona State's Tempe Campus.
