= Barrett, The Honors College =

Arizona State University program

Coordinates: 33.4155°N 111.9285°W

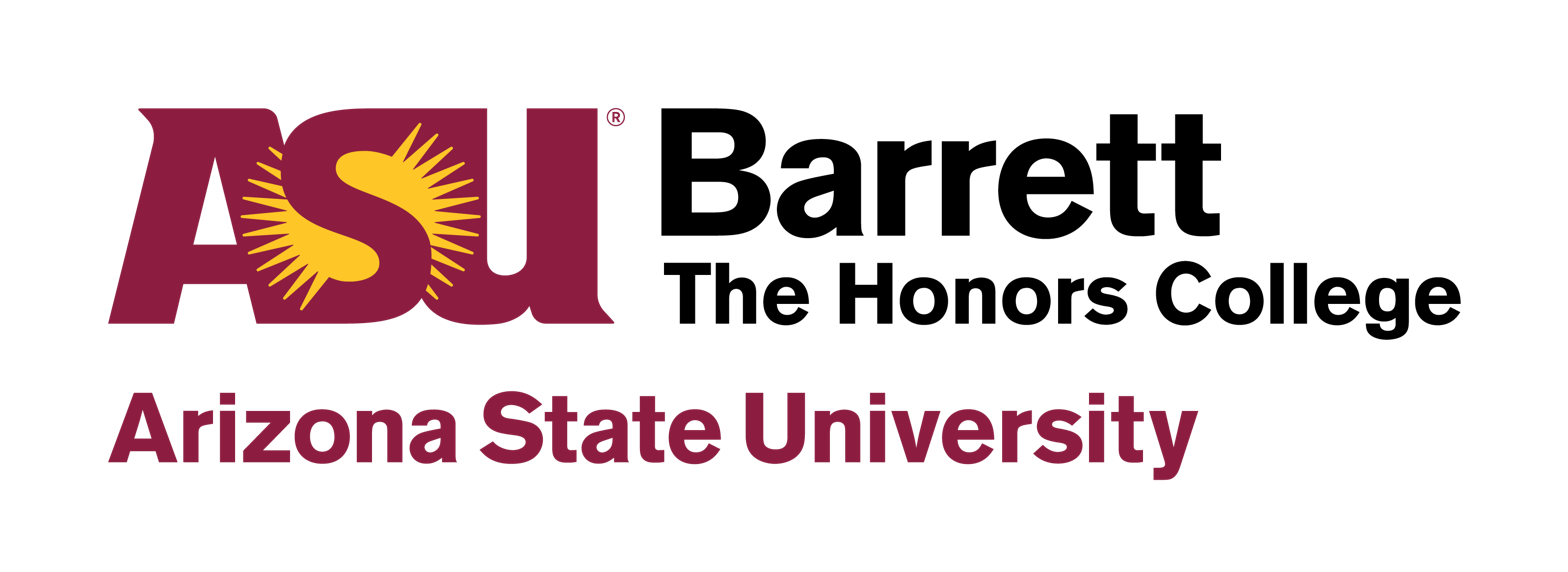
- Type: Public
- Established: 1988
- Affiliations: Arizona State University
- Dean: Dr. Tara Williams
- Faculty: 135
- Undergraduates: 7,200
- Location: Tempe, Arizona
- Website: barretthonors.asu.edu

Barrett, The Honors College at Arizona State University (formerly known as ASU University Honors College) is a university honors program. The honors college was first authorized by the Arizona Board of Regents in 1988 as a four-year, residential program on ASU's Tempe campus. In 2001, the college was renamed in honor of ASU supporters Craig Barrett, former CEO of Intel, and Barbara Barrett, former U.S. Secretary of the Air Force. Since 2008, honors programs and classes have been offered at each of ASU's campuses, in addition to through online degree programs.
