= Old Main (Arizona State University) =

- U.S. National Register of Historic Places
- 2021
- Location: Tempe, Arizona
- Coordinates: 33°25′14″N 111°56′2.50″W
- Built: 1894-1898
- Architect: W. A McGinnis
- Architectural style: Queen Anne/Richardsonian Romanesque
- NRHP reference No.: 85000052
- Added to NRHP: January 7, 1985

Old Main, at 400 East Tyler Mall on the Tempe campus of Arizona State University, is the oldest building on the campus. It was built in 1898 and was designed by W. A. McGinnis in the Victorian Queen Anne style with Richardsonian Romanesque influences. Along with the Administration/Science Building (now the University Club) and a third building no longer extant, Old Main defined the first quad on the campus of the Arizona Territorial Normal School; Arizona would not become a state for 14 years after Old Main was dedicated.

Old Main was listed on the National Register of Historic Places in 1985 as "Main Building, Tempe Normal School" The building has been restored since it was received historic status.

== History ==
Construction began on Old Main in 1894, and it was dedicated in February 1898. The building was originally all classrooms on the second and third floor, with an auditorium (the Assembly Hall) on the upper floor and a library on the lower level. In 1911, Theodore Roosevelt came to Arizona for the dedication of the Roosevelt Dam, and spoke on the steps of Old Main. In his speech, he envisioned the opportunities the dam and the resulting irrigation for farming would create for Arizona and opined that some day perhaps as many as 100,000 people might live in the valley. The dam made possible the Salt River Project and eventually led to the evolution of the Salt River Valley as a major metropolitan area.

For decades, Old Main was the largest building in the Salt River Valley. Its significance to the development of both Tempe and the university was great. After Old Main was built, alumni went to the legislature to ask that the admission standards be raised, in order to bring the stature of the institution up to the stature of the building.

The designation of Old Main as a historic place with its listing on the National Register of Historic Places in 1985 – the year of ASU's centennial – provoked interest in restoring and renovation the building. Efforts began in 1990, and by 1996 it had become an important part of the university’s $400 million "Campaign for Leadership". Thanks to a $5.7 million campaign led by the ASU Alumni Association, the building was refurbished to the period in which it was constructed.

== Architecture ==
Old Main is a two and one-half stories tall brick 30-by-135-foot (9.1 m × 41.1 m) building with a full basement set on a granite base. The design is primarily Queen Anne, but shows influences of the Richardson Romanesque style. It has a hipped and projecting gabled pressed-metal roof with castellated cresting and metal ridge finials, and a red sandstone entrance stairway. The main (northern) facade faces University Drive and features two projecting gables. The two-story porch had been removed at some point in the building's history, but was restored in the modern renovation. The windows and doors generally have stone lintels; the upper level windows on the north side have circular arches, while those on the south side have segmented ones. The building is wrapped by stone courses at the window sill level.

In 1953, a fire stair was added to the front of the building between the two gables. This was removed in the recent restoration.
