= Administration/Science Building =

United States historic place in Tempe, Arizona

- Administration/Science Building (University Club)
- U.S. National Register of Historic Places
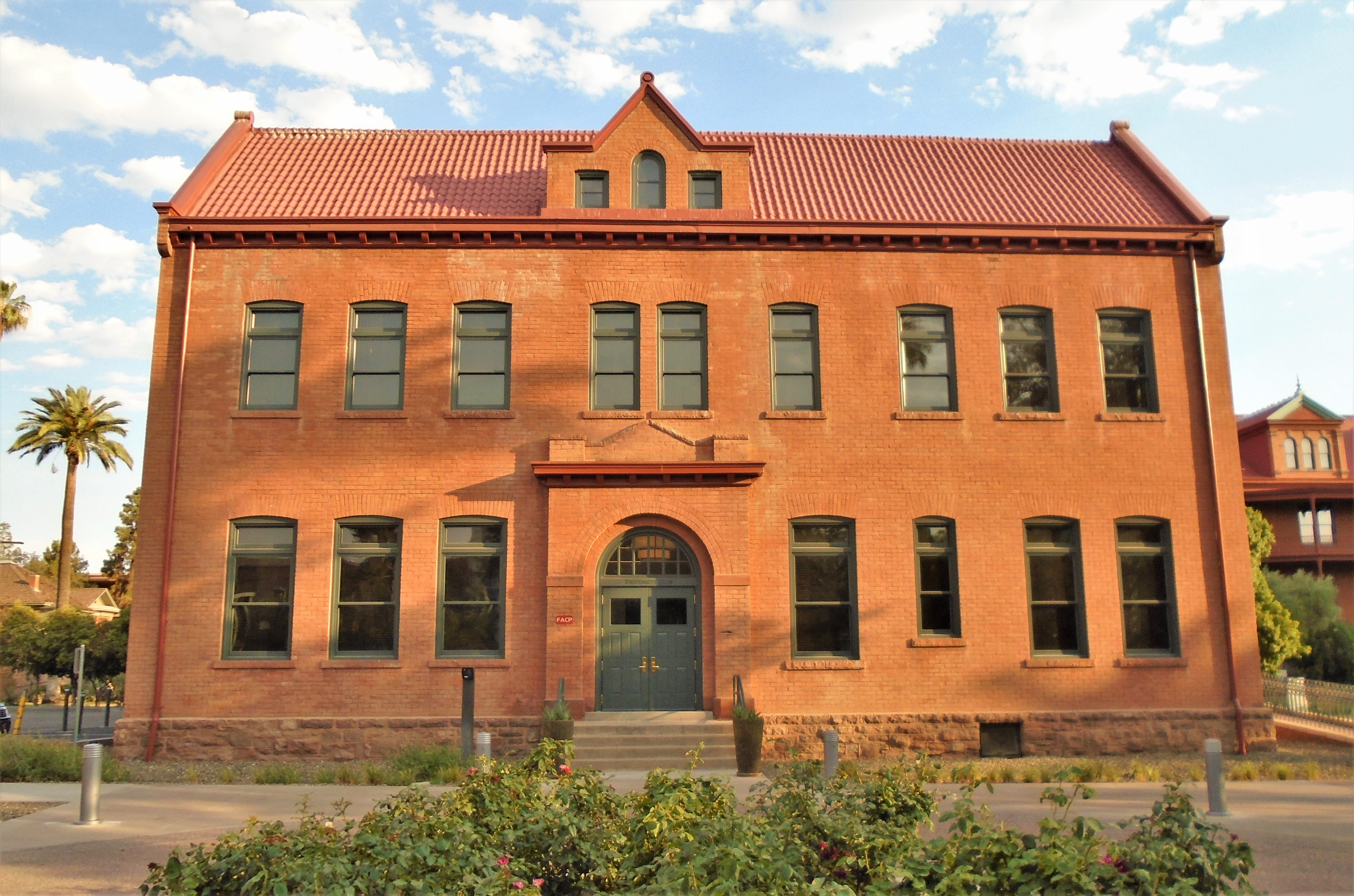
- (2021)

- Location within Arizona Location within the United States
- Location: 425 E. University Dr., Tempe, Arizona
- Coordinates: 33°25′15″N 111°55′57″W
- Built: c.1908-1909
- Built by: Harvey D. Patton
- Architect: D. W. Millard
- Architectural style: Queen Anne/Neoclassical
- MPS: Tempe MRA
- NRHP reference No.: 85002169
- Added to NRHP: September 4, 1985

The Administration/Science Building (Building 11), at 425 University Drive on the Tempe campus of Arizona State University, was built in 1908 or 1909 and was designed by D. W. Millard in the Queen Anne style influenced by Neoclassicism. The second-oldest building on the campus, it, along with Old Main and a third building no longer extant formed the first quad in what was then Arizona Territorial Normal School. It was originally called Science Hall. The building was remodeled several times and was used for a variety of purposes, but was scheduled for demolition in 1983. It was renovated and restored after it received historic status. Currently, it is the home of the University Club, a members-only institution open to faculty, staff, corporate and community members and parents of continuing students.

The building was listed on the National Register of Historic Places in 1985 under the name "Administration/Science Building". It is also listed on the Arizona Register of Historic Places.

== History ==
The building, designed by D. W. Millard and built by Harvey D. Patton, was constructed in 1908 or 1909, and was one of three original buildings that formed the first quad of the Territorial Normal School in Tempe; Old Main is the only other building that survives today. It was originally constructed to house the school's small science department as well as to serve administrative functions.

As the normal school grew, the building was soon modified. It was remodeled in 1935 and again in 1950; the latter renovation coincided with the science department moving to a new Sciences Building – now known as Discovery Hall – and the conversion of "Old Science Hall" into the home of Arizona State College's English department. The 1950 addition, with Mel Ensign as architect, added a fire stair and restroom projection and was one of several alterations to the now-historic buildings on campus: an expansion was made to Old Main, for instance. In the mid-1960s, the English department moved to its own new home: the Language and Literature Building. Soon after, during the Vietnam War, ROTC programs moved in, and by the 1980s it was known as the "Fine Arts Annex" and housed some arts programs.

In the summer of 1983, the School of Art was told that the structure, whose foundation had been damaged by rot and termites, was no longer suitable to be occupied; the building was slated for demolition. However, in the mid-1980s, several university buildings from the 1930s and earlier were listed on the National Register of Historic Places, including the Fine Arts Annex.

After the building's designation as historic, renovations were made to remove the 1950 Ensign addition and restore the building to its original appearance. In 1989, the University Club was created as a members-only club for faculty, staff, parents of current ASU students and corporate and community members.

== Architecture ==
Science Hall is a two-story brick building measuring 70 feet (21 m) by 92 feet (28 m), constructed on a granite foundation.

While Science Hall is executed in the Queen Anne style with its scale, massing and steeply pitched roof, it also reflects how Classical Revival influences had been growing since the turn of the century, with denticulated cornices; an arcaded entry; and a pedimented Palladian dormer.
