= Arizona State University Tempe campus =

Largest campus that composes Arizona State University

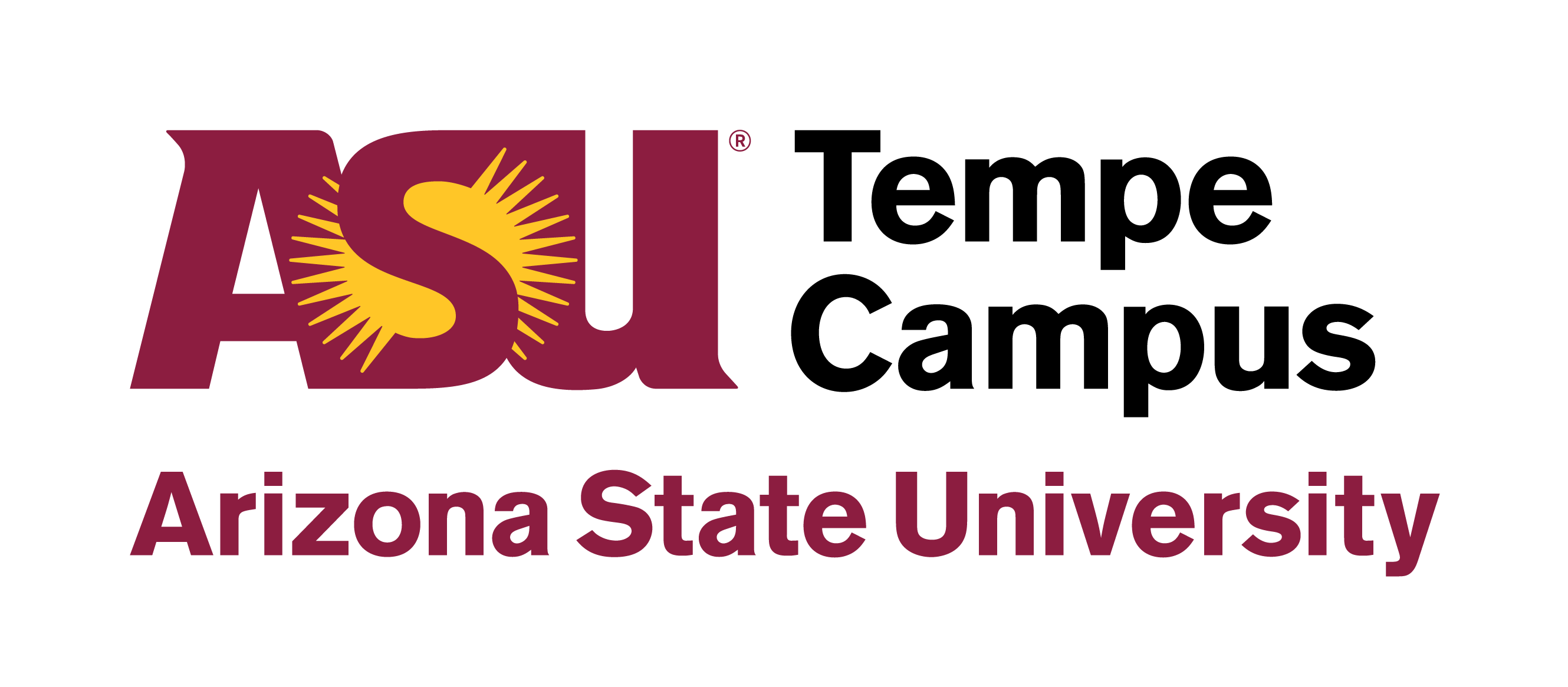
- Type: Main campus of Arizona State University
- Established: 1885
- Students: 54,866 (Fall 2021) (Note: This figure is summed from students whose academic majors are based on the Tempe campus – any ASU student may be enrolled in classes on any of the four campuses simultaneously.)
- Location: Tempe, Arizona, United States; 33.4172°N 111.9365°W
- Campus: Urban Tempe: 631.6 acres (2.556 km^{2})
- Website: campus.asu.edu/tempe

Arizona State University Tempe campus is the main campus of Arizona State University, and the largest of the five campuses that comprise the university. The campus lies in the heart of Tempe, Arizona, about eight miles (13 km) east of Downtown Phoenix. The campus is considered urban, and is approximately 642 acres (2.6 km^{2}) in size. The campus is arranged around broad pedestrian malls and, in toto, is considered to be an arboretum. ASU has an extensive public art collection, considered one of the ten best among university public art collections in the United States. Against the northwest edge of campus is the Mill Avenue district (part of Downtown Tempe) which has a college atmosphere that attracts many students to its restaurants and bars. ASU's Tempe Campus is also home to all of the university's athletic facilities.

== History ==
The Tempe campus is the original campus, and Old Main, the first building constructed on campus in 1894, still stands today. The university used to be named the Arizona Territorial Normal School and was initially used to train public school teachers. In 1925 the college was renamed the Tempe State Teachers College and started offering its first four-year bachelor's degree. After gaining accreditation in 1933, the college started offering graduated programs in 1937. The Tempe campus is also the largest of the four campuses, with 54,866 students enrolled in its programs. There are many notable landmarks on campus, including Grady Gammage Memorial Auditorium, designed by Frank Lloyd Wright. Other notable landmarks include Palm Walk, which is lined by 111 palm trees, Charles Trumbull Hayden Library, Old Main, the University Club Building, and University Bridge.

== Academics ==
The Tempe campus is home to the following schools and colleges:

- College of Liberal Arts and Sciences
- School of Sustainability
- Herberger Institute for Design and the Arts
- Ira A. Fulton School of Engineering
- W.P. Carey School of Business

In addition, the Tempe campus hosts courses and programs offered by the following schools and colleges:

- Barrett, The Honors College (All campuses)
- Graduate College (All campuses)
- Mary Lou Fulton Teachers College
- University College (All campuses)

== Residence Halls ==
North Neighborhood

- Manzanita Hall (Freshman – Residential College of Liberal Arts and Sciences and Mary Lou Fulton Teacher's College)
- Tooker House (Freshman – Residential College of Ira A. Fulton Schools of Engineering)
- Palo Verde East (Freshman – Residential College of Liberal Arts and Sciences and Mary Lou Fulton Teacher's College)
- Palo Verde West (Freshman – Residential College of Liberal Arts and Science and Mary Lou Fulton Teacher's College)
- San Pablo Hall (Freshman – Residential College of Health Solutions, Mary Lou Fulton Teacher's College, and School for the Future of Innovation in Society)

Center Neighborhood

- Mill Avenue Student Housing (Freshman - Herberger Institute for Design and the Arts)
- McClintock Hall (Upper Division students - Herberger Institute for Design and the Arts)

South Neighborhood

- Barrett Honors College (Freshman-Senior) (Cereus) (Agave) (Sustainability House at Barrett, SHAB) (Cottonwood) (Rosewood) (Juniper) (Willow)
- Hassayampa Academic Village (A–E) (Mohave Hall – WP Carey School of Business) (Arroyo – WP Carey School of Business) (Jojoba Hall – WP Carey School of Business) (Chuparosa Hall – – WP Carey School of Business) (Acacia Hall – – WP Carey School of Business Leader's Academy)
- Hassayampa Academic Village (F–H) (Mesquite Hall – WP Carey School of Business) (Verbena Hall – WP Carey School of Business) (Acourtia Hall – WP Carey School of Business)
- Sonora Center (Freshman-Senior Dependant on Year)
- Adelphi Commons I (Freshman – Mary Lou Fulton Teachers College, College of Liberal Arts and Sciences, Barrett, the Honors College, College of Health Solutions, and W.P. Carey School of Business)
- Adelphi Commons II (Freshman – Residential of Ira A. Fulton Schools of Engineering, College of Integrative Sciences and Arts, and School of Sustainability)

Campus Apartments

- University Towers (Upper division)
- Greek Leadership Village (Upper-division, only for students in sororities and fraternities)
- Vista del Sol (Upper division) – Privately owned, operated, and managed by American Campus Communities through an on campus Real-Estate Investment Trust (Student REIT) set up through American Campus Communities and Arizona State University. This agreement is one of the first of its kind.

== Former Residence Halls ==
- Mariposa Hall - Demolished 2007
- Sahuaro Hall - Demolished 2007
- Ocotillo Hall - Demolished 2011
- Palo Verde Main - Demolished 2015
- Cholla Apartments - Demolished 2016
- Best Hall - Demolished 2026
- Hayden Hall - Demolished 2026
- Irish Hall - Demolished 2026

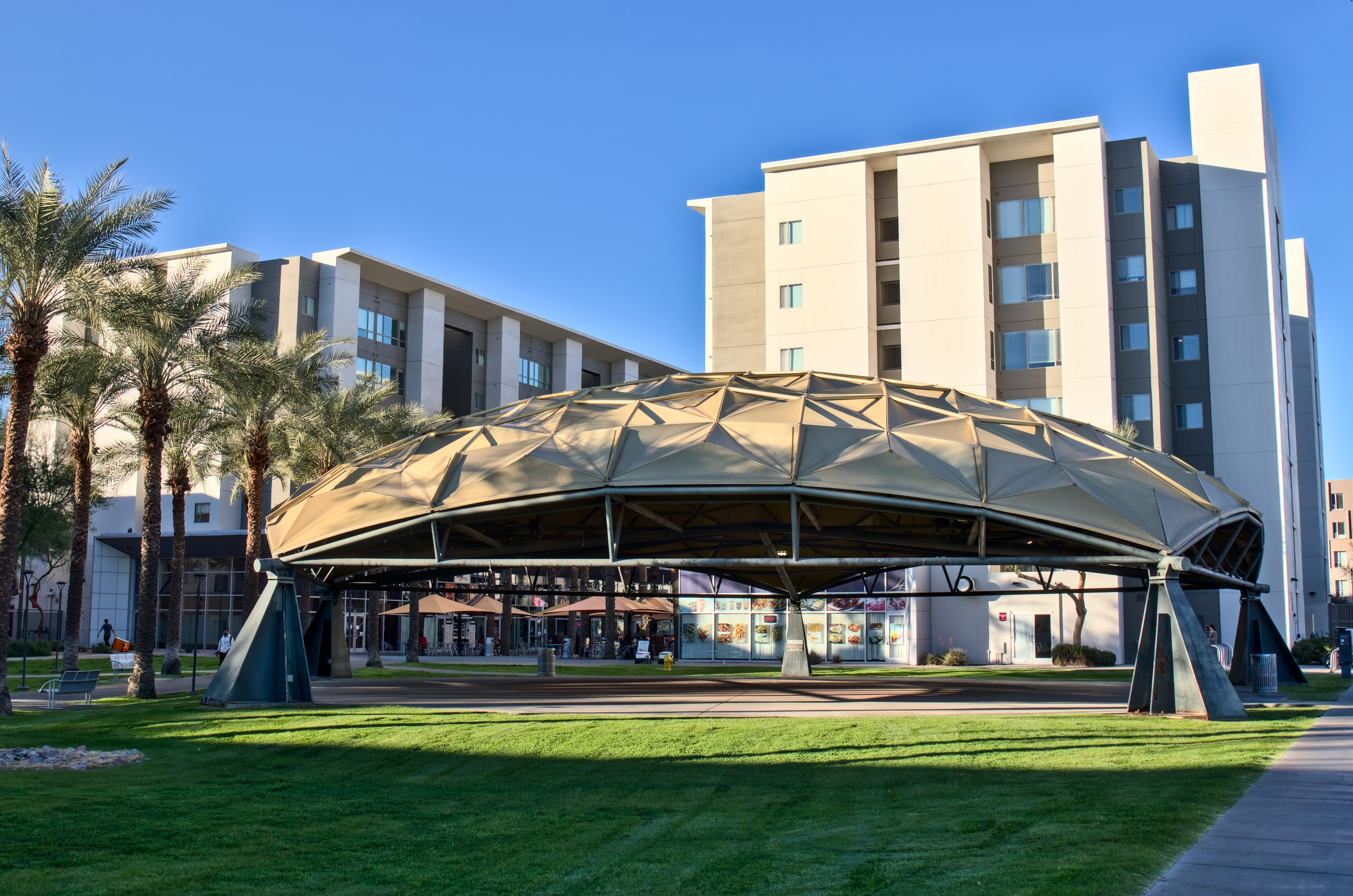
Vista del Sol

== See also ==
- Desert Financial Arena

== Gallery ==
Old Main (1898), the oldest building on campus

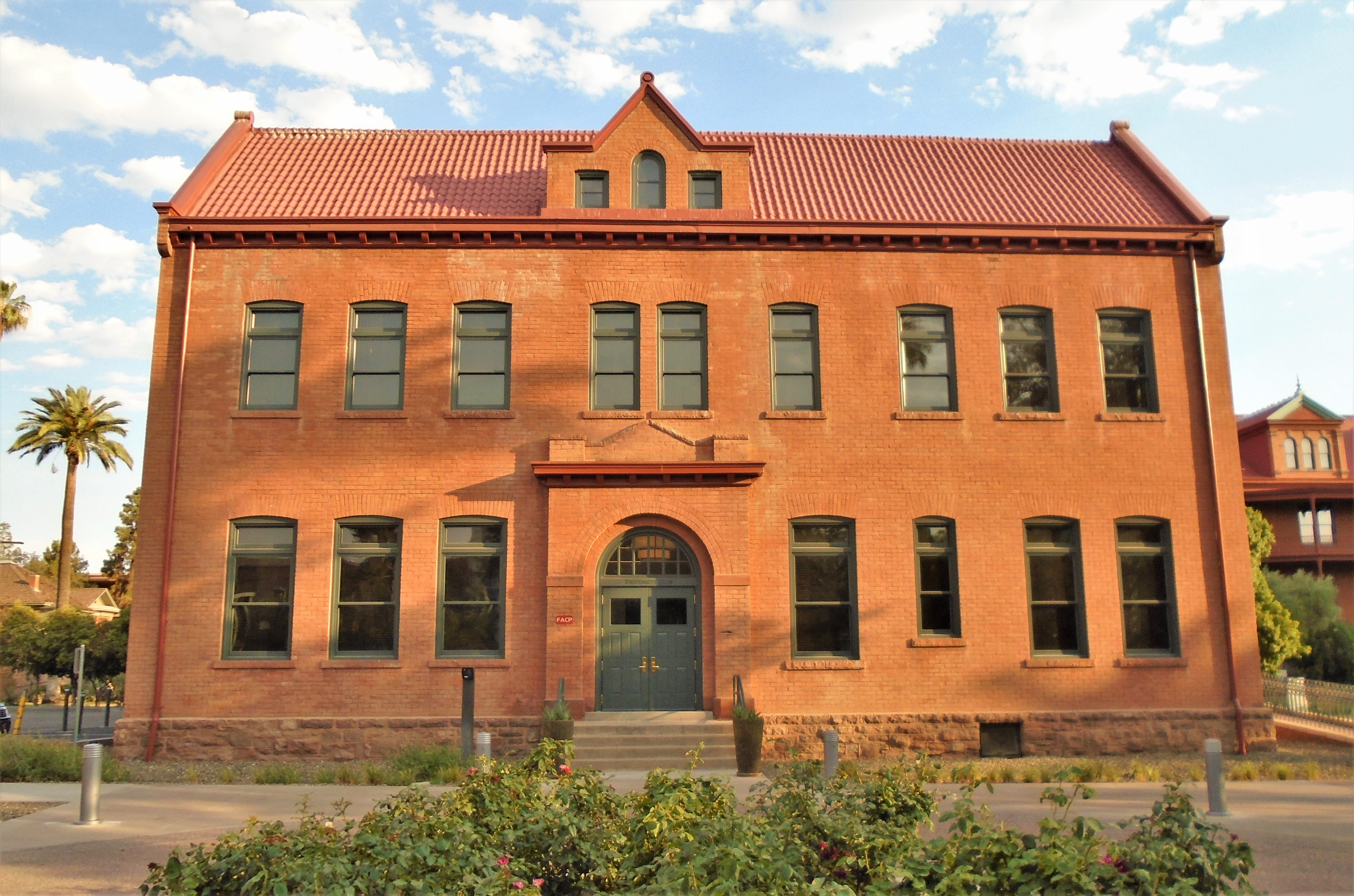
University Club (c.1909), the second oldest building on campus

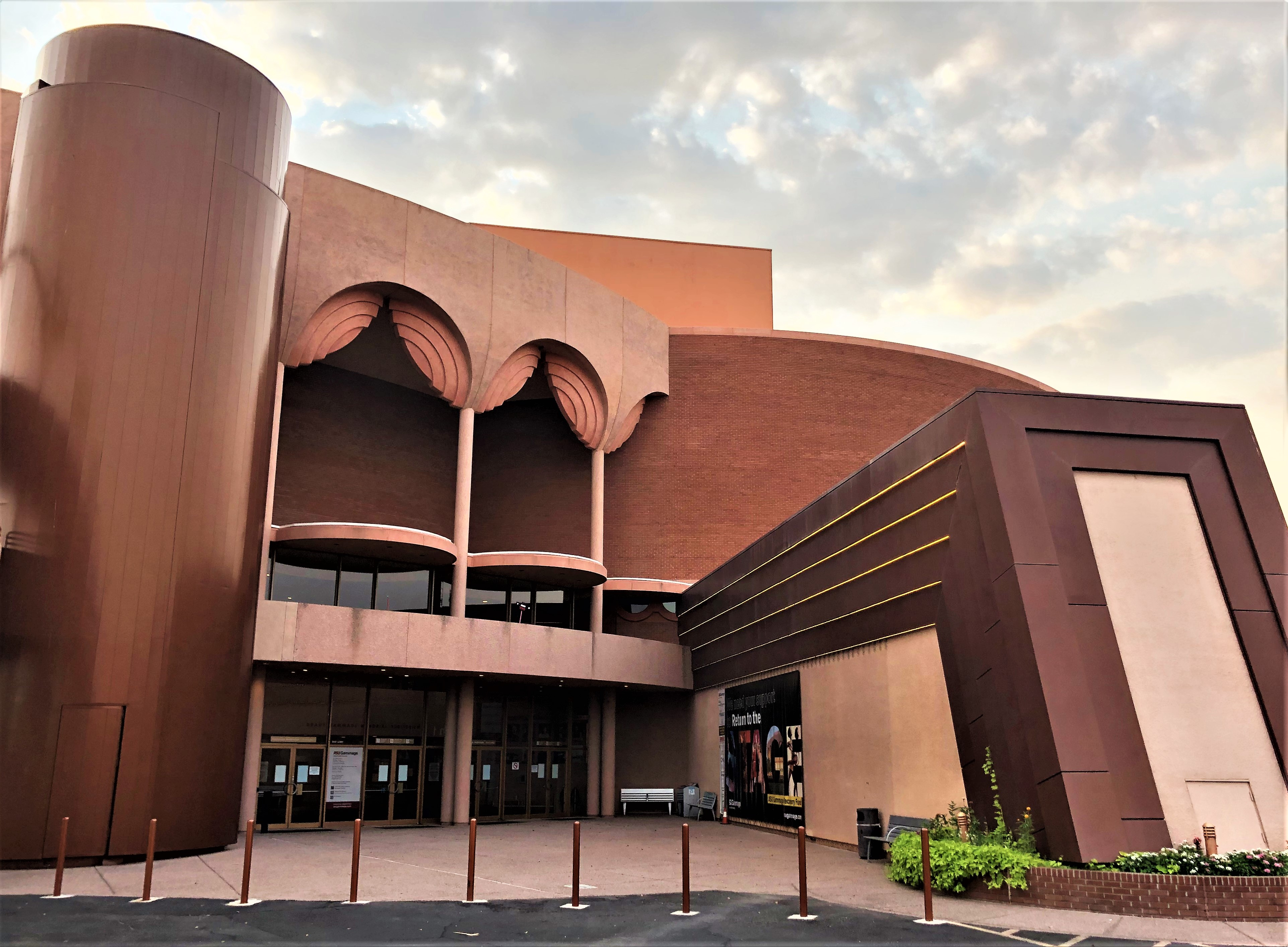
The east entrance to Gammage Memorial Auditorium designed by Frank Lloyd Wright

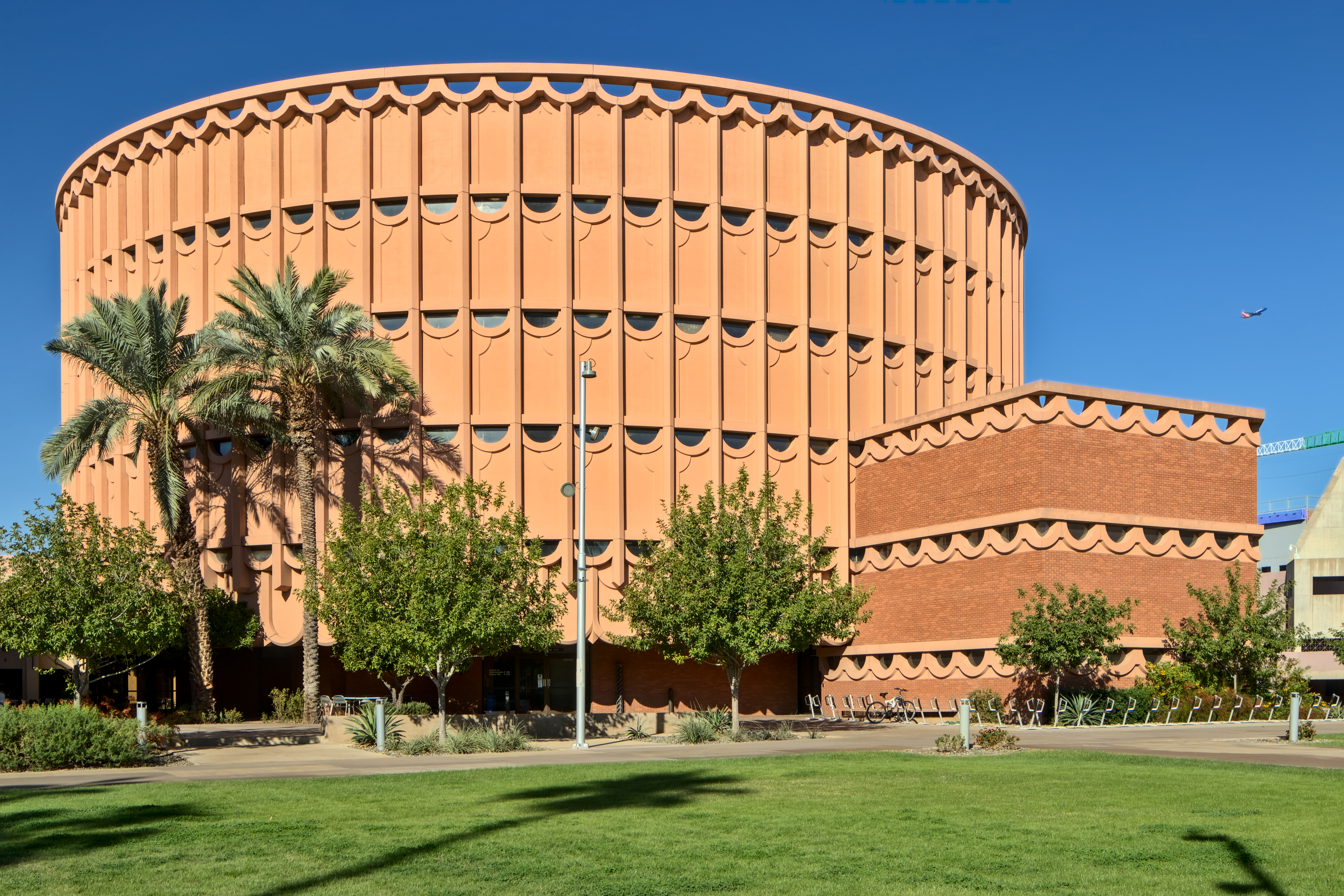
The School of Music

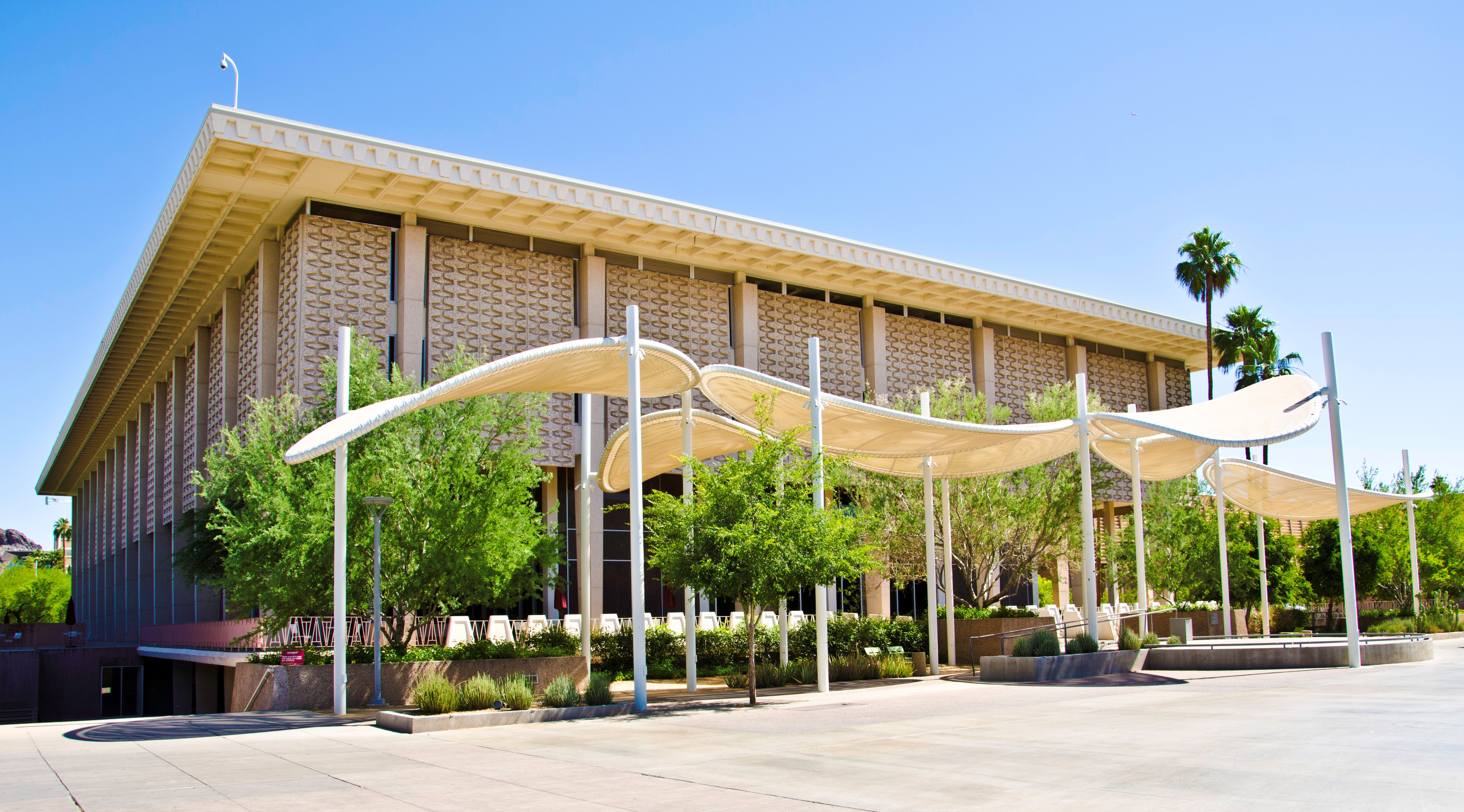
The main library on campus is the Hayden Library which is mostly located underground

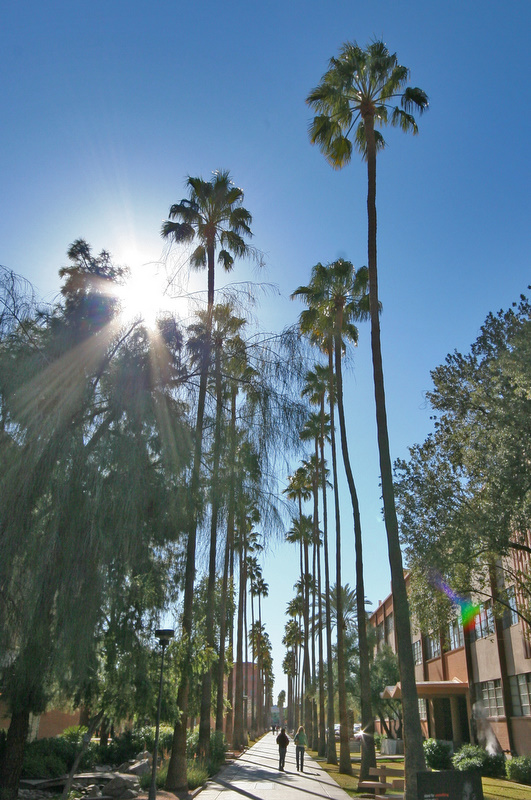
Palm Walk is the main pedestrian route going through the middle of campus

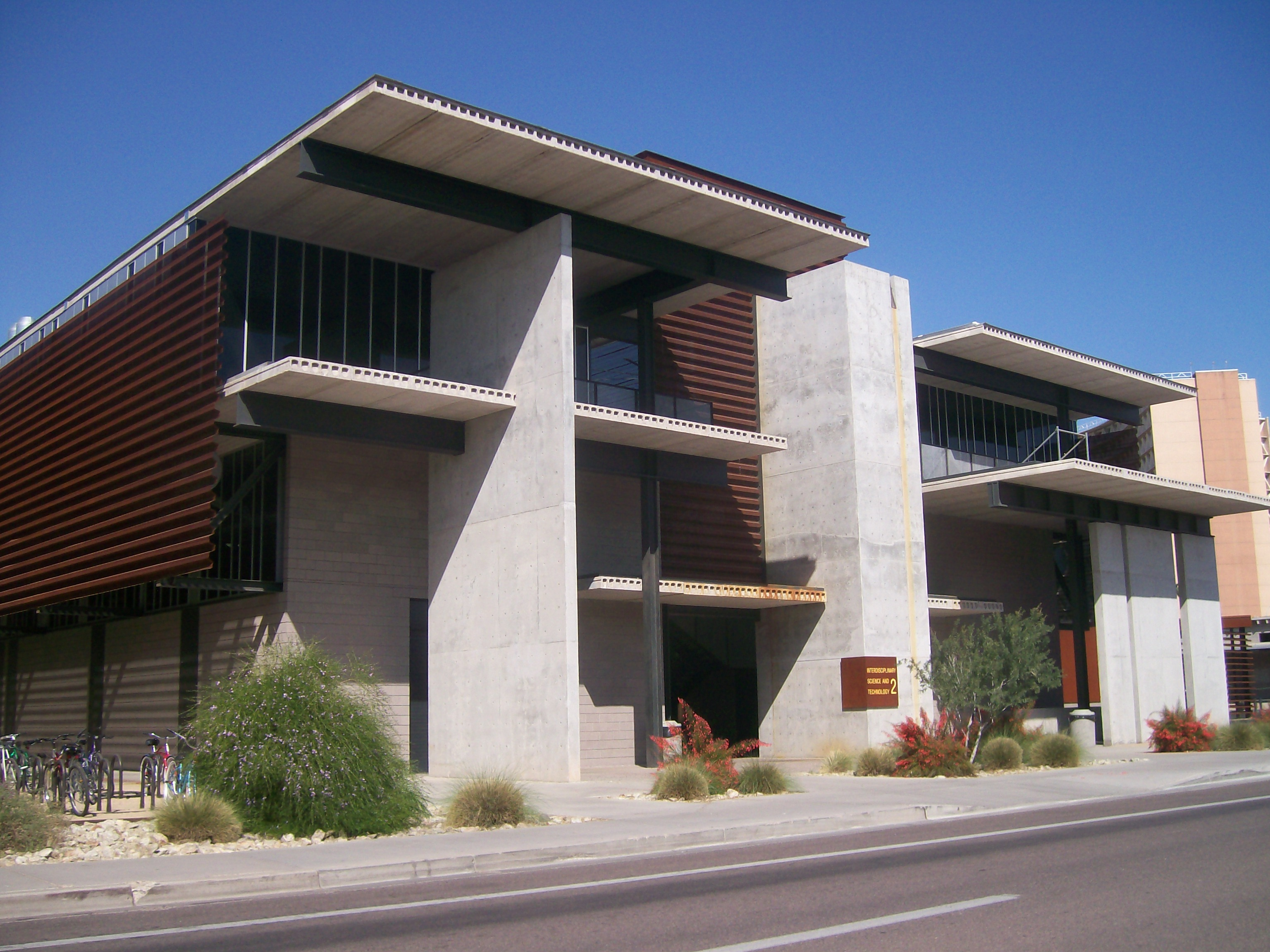
The Interdisciplinary Science and Technology Building 2

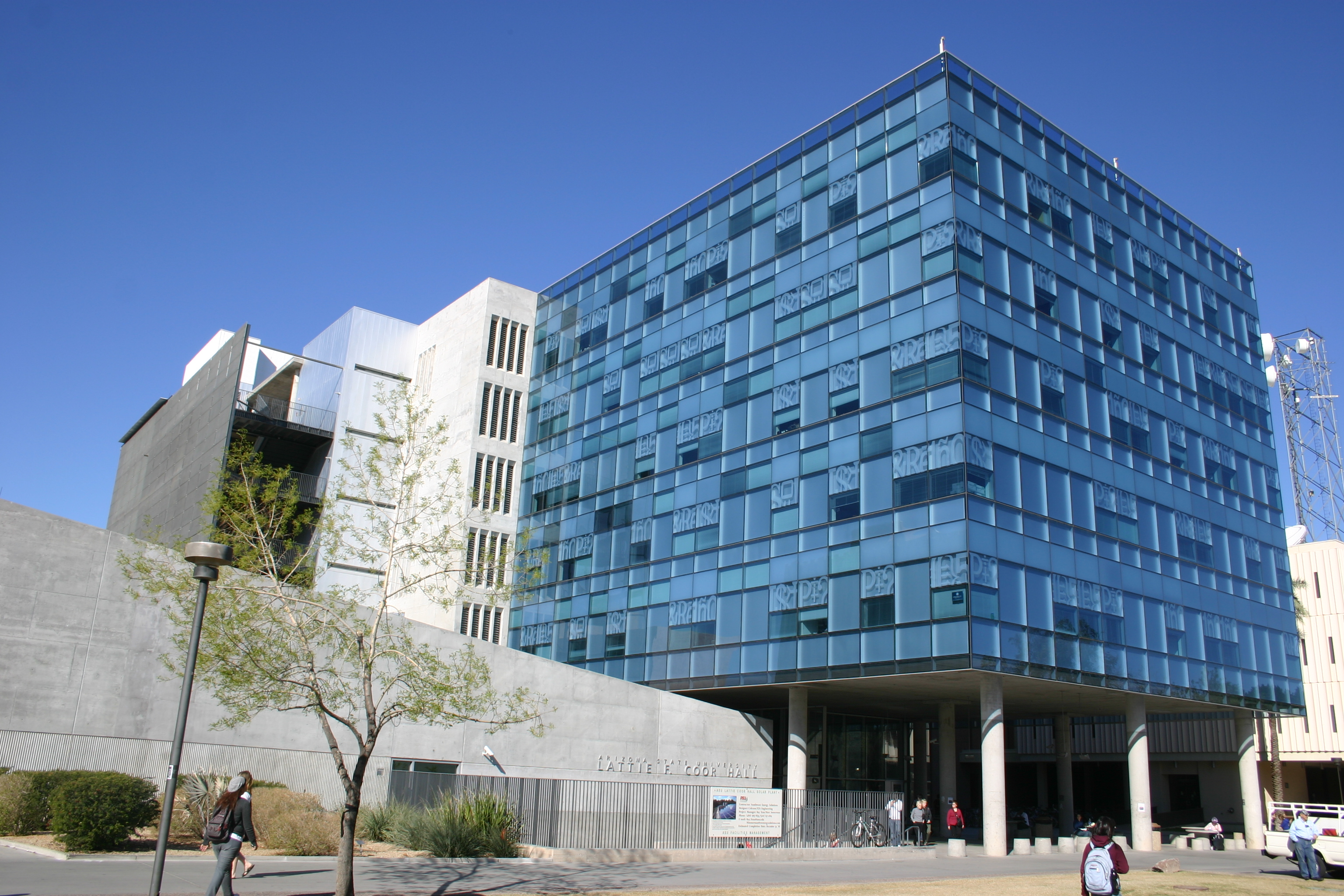
The south east side of Lattie F. Coor Hall

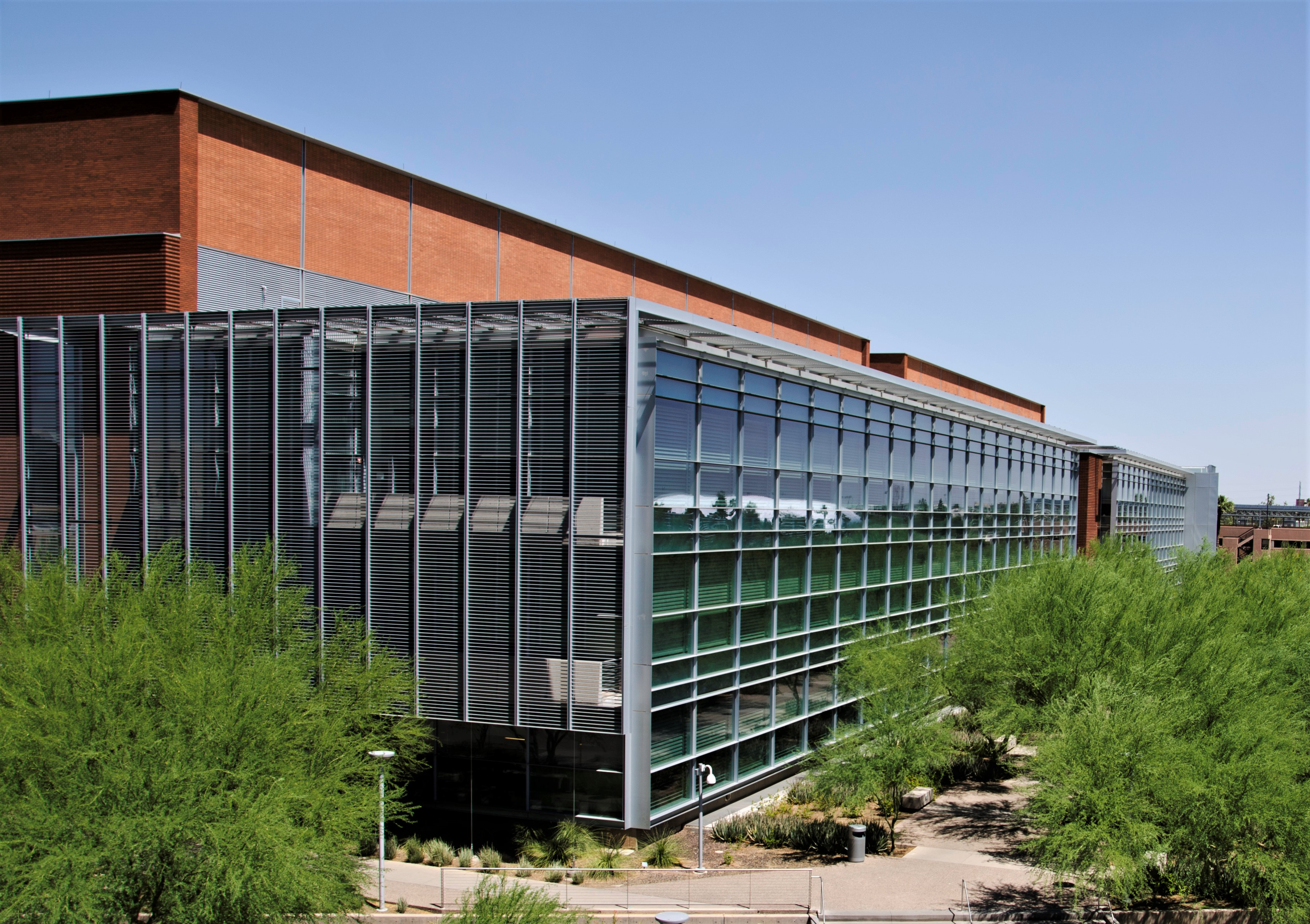
The Biodesign Institute building

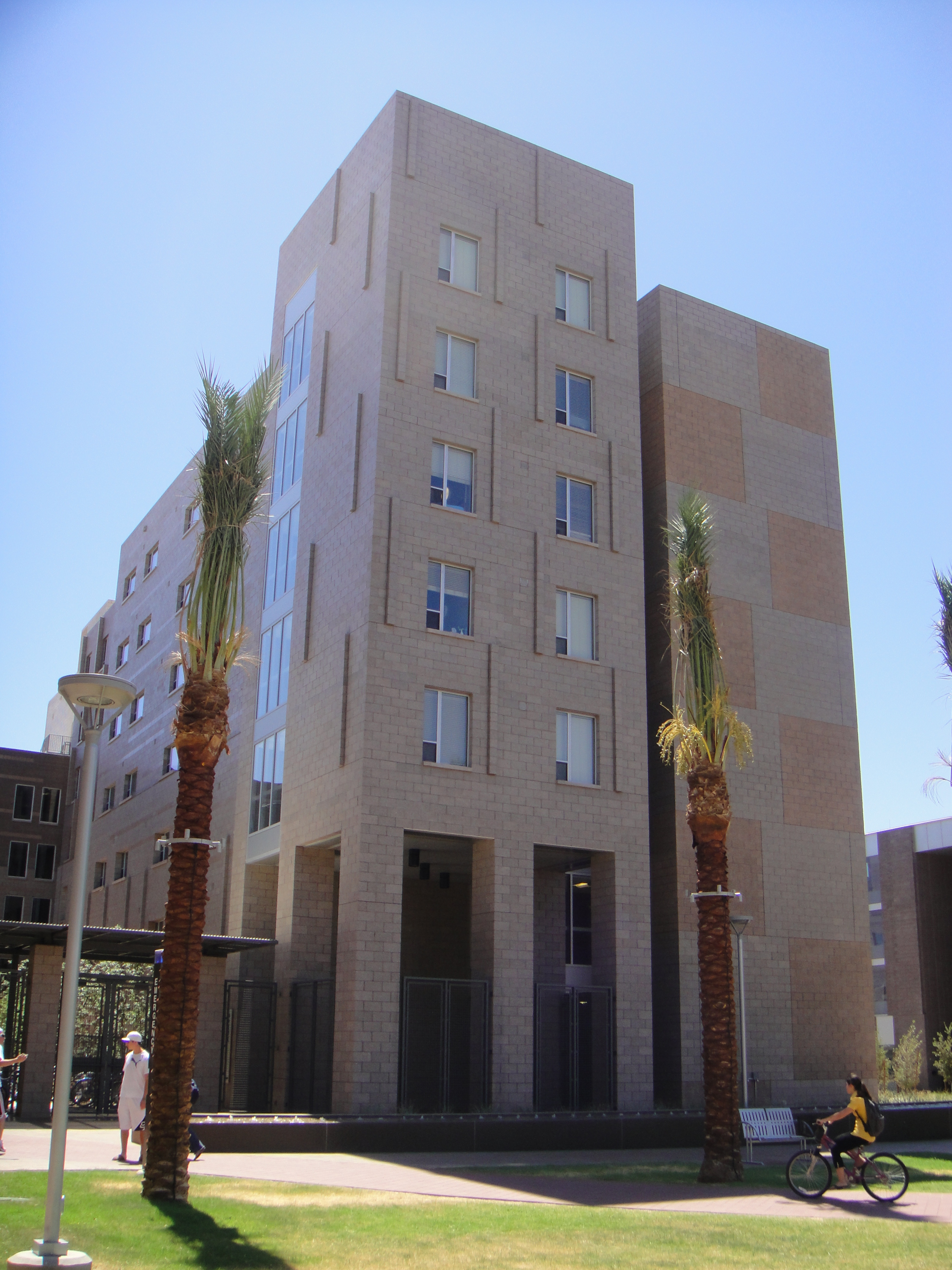
Agave Hall of Barrett, The Honors College

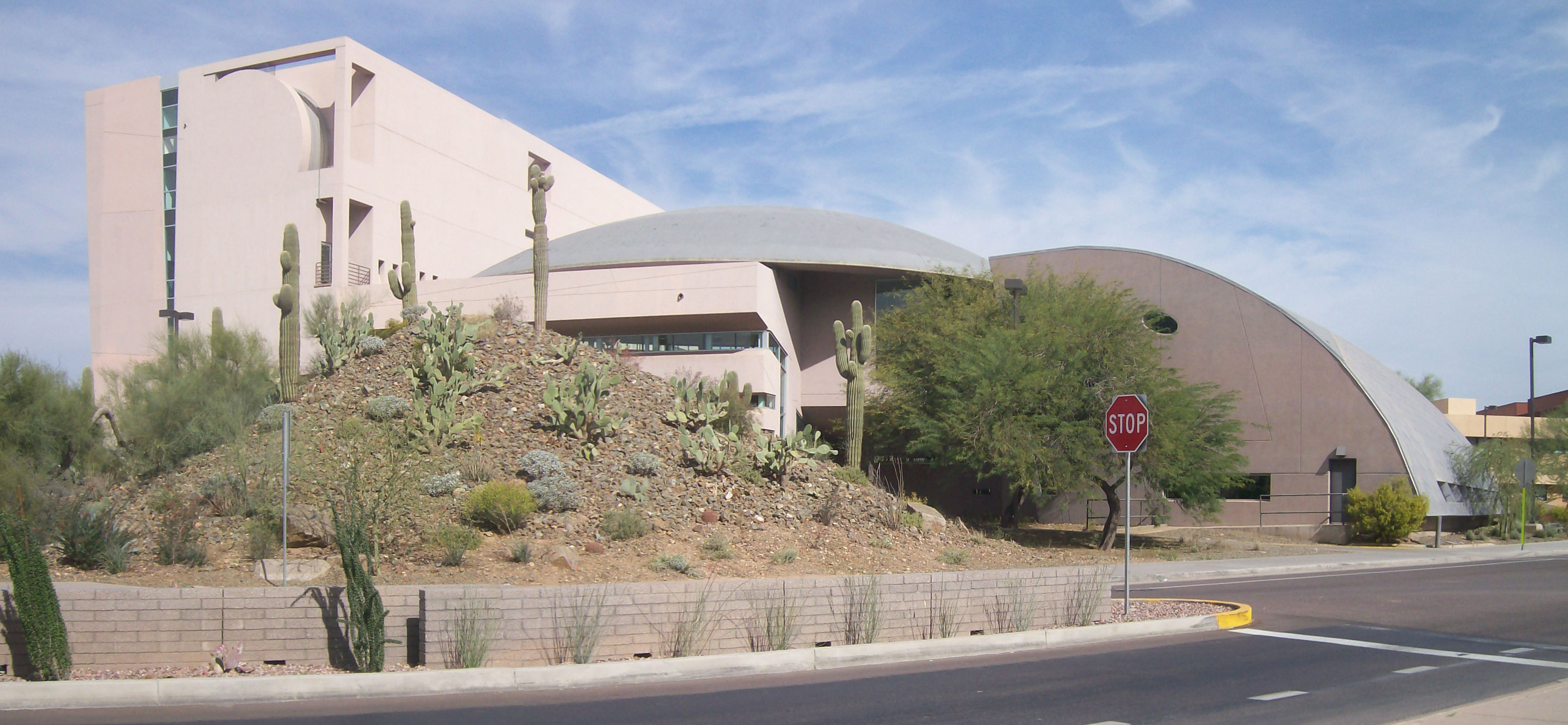
The Ross-Blakley Law Library

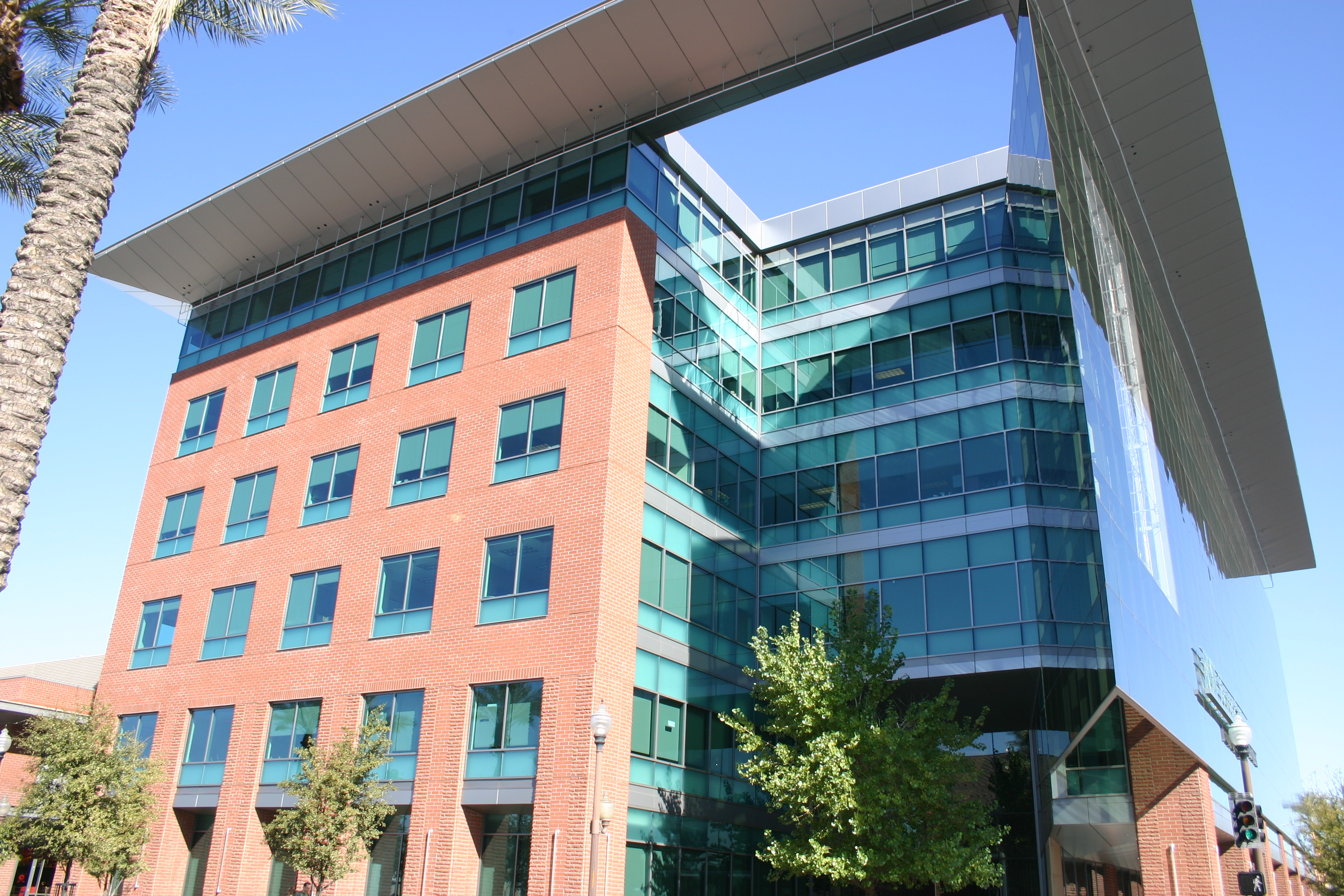
The Fulton Center (ASU Foundation building)

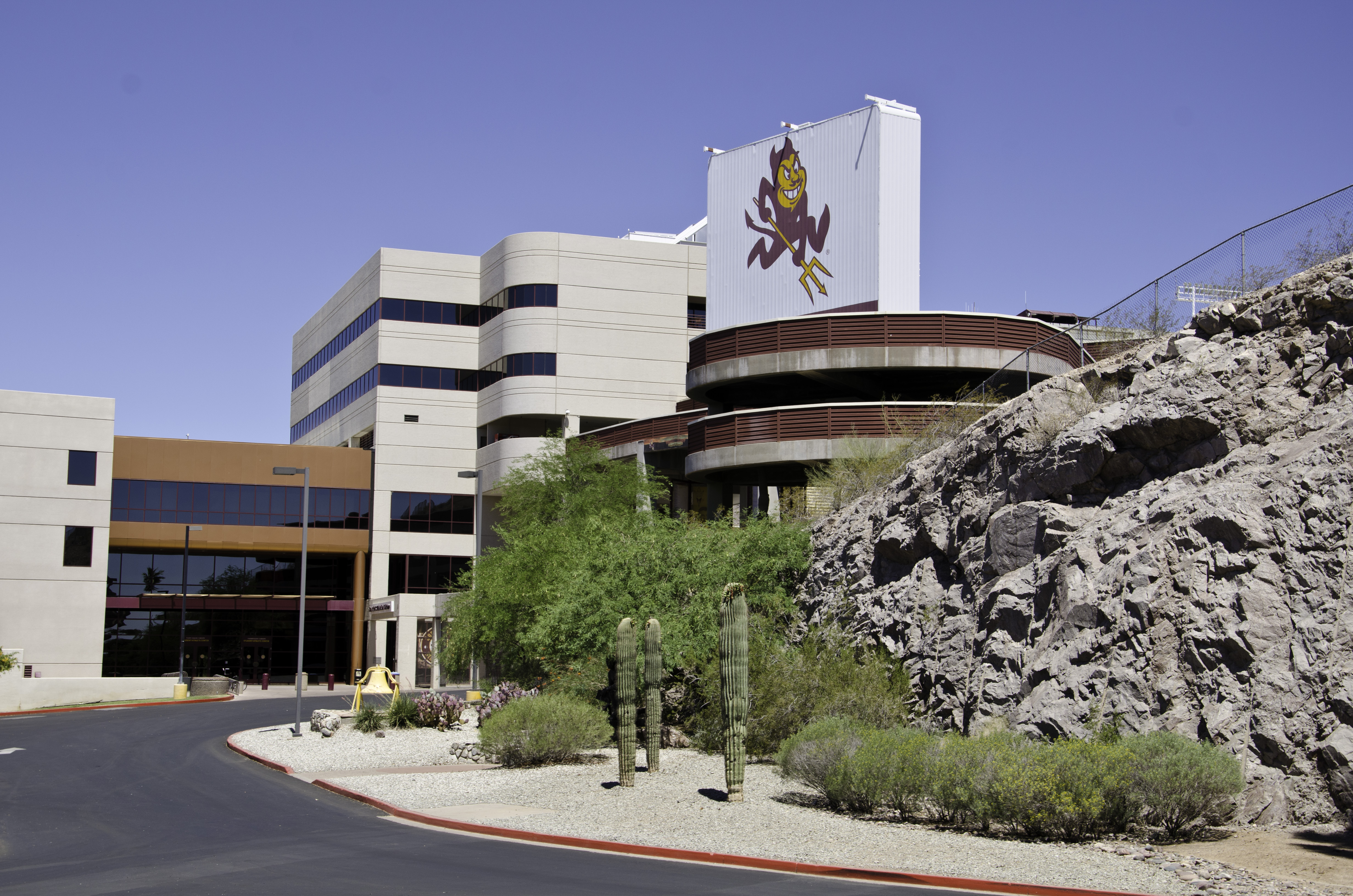
Mountain America Stadium, home to the ASU football team

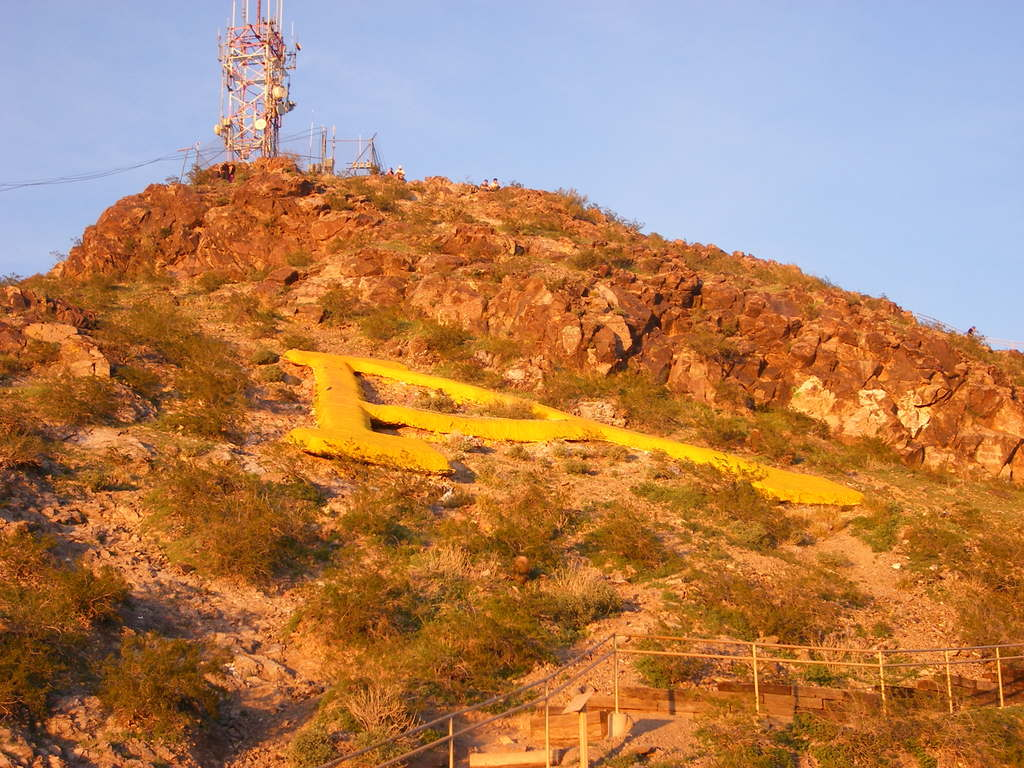
"A" Mountain next to Mountain America Stadium
