= Palm Walk =

Pedestrian mall on the Arizona State University Tempe campus

Coordinates: 33.4202°N 111.9327°W

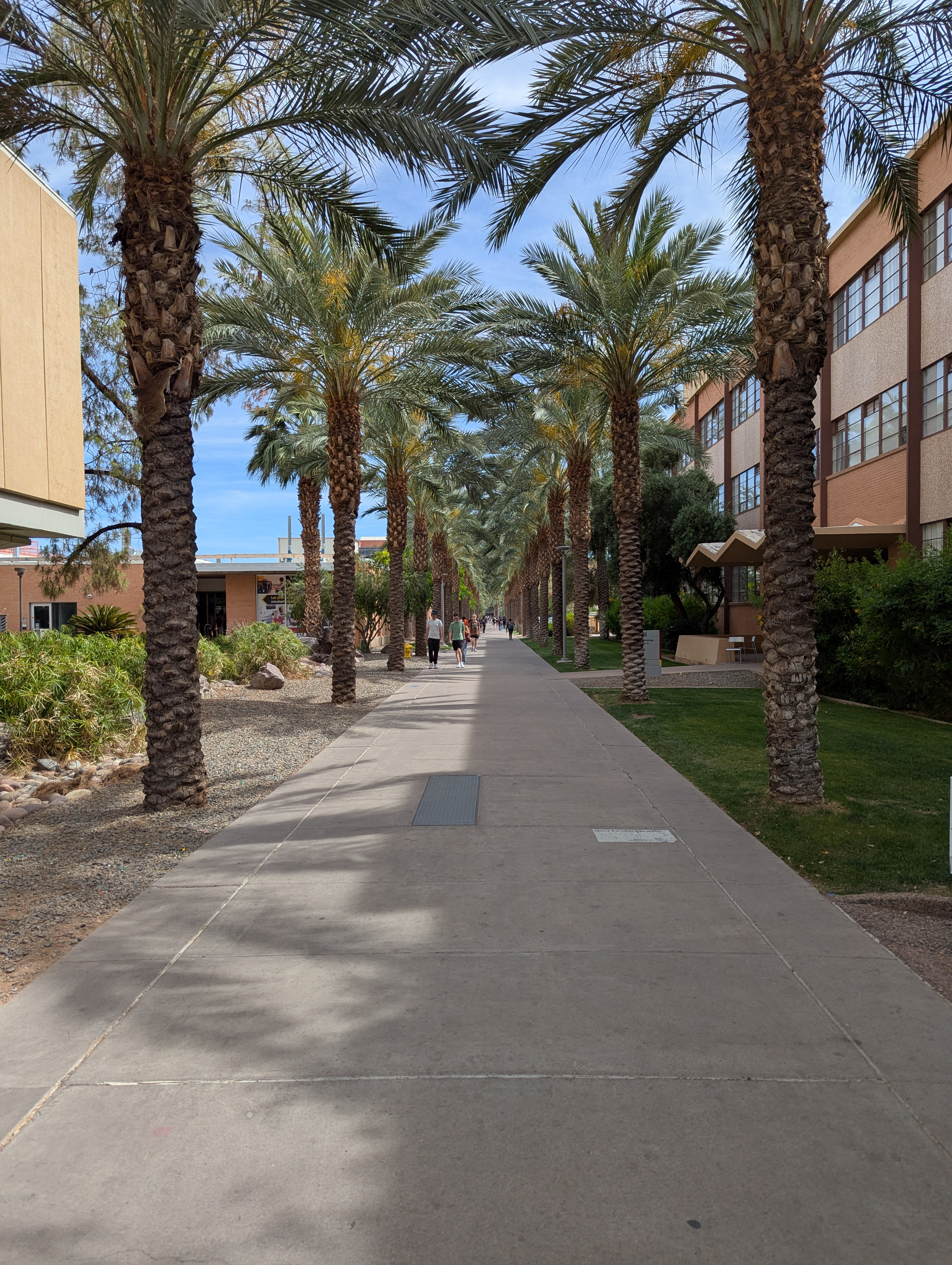
Palm Walk in 2025, after the 2016 tree replacement

Palm Walk is a pedestrian mall located on Arizona State University's Tempe campus that is lined with 110 date palms. The north-south path runs for nearly 0.4 miles (0.64 km) starts at the foot of University Bridge, which crosses over University Drive, before terminating at the entrance to the Sun Devil Fitness Complex. The path itself follows the old alignment of Normal Avenue, before it was incorporated into the expanding college's campus.

The original palm trees were Mexican fan palms planted in phases between circa 1916 and 1930, at what was then the eastern edge of campus. The palms became a campus landmark, with the first appearance of "palm walk" as a name in university publications dating to 1967. At the end of their life span, the original palms were replaced between 2016 and 2018 with Medjool date palms which offer a larger shade canopy; the dates are harvested annually and sold to the public.

== History ==
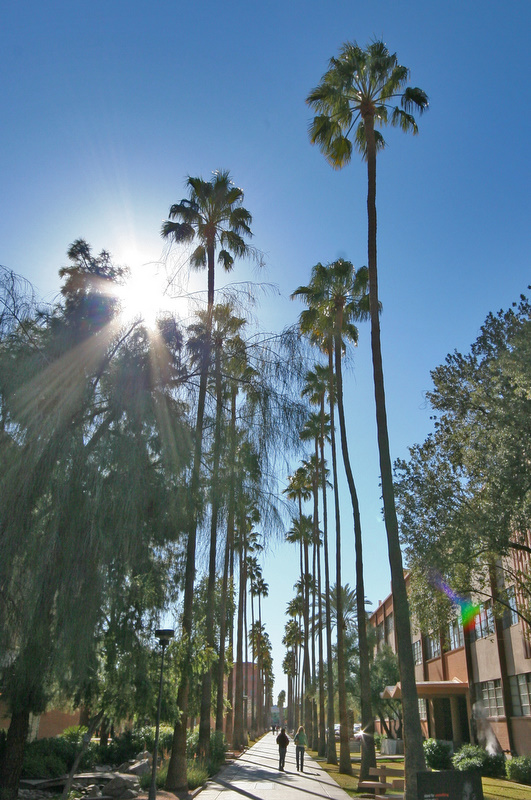
Palm Walk in 2017, with the original Mexican fan palms

=== Origins ===
The history of Palm Walk dates to an early attempt at campus beautification by Tempe Normal School president Arthur John Matthews. While popularly cited as being planted in 1916, there is no definitive date on when the trees were planted. The best estimates for when the trees were planted vary from 1916 to 1919, although there also exist orders for trees in 1917 and 1918, the latter of which mentions the purchase of palm trees. Originally planted on the northern end of the walk near the original Normal School campus, the trees were later planted to the south, as the college expanded. The last trees were planted in 1930 or the 1930s, depending on sources, and were smaller than the trees on northern portions of the route. As Palm Walk runs along the former alignment of Normal Avenue to what would have been the eastern edge of the main campus as it was built, it marked the eastern boundary for campus. As the campus expanded over the years, it became a local landmark for the university. In earlier years, commencement ceremonies featured students parading south down Palm Walk to Goodwin Stadium.

Originally, there was no official name for Palm Walk, as a 1926 catalog for the school called it "College Palms". By 1932, the name was simplified and called "The Palms", and the earliest known use of the current name by the university was from a 1967 pamphlet that used "palm walk".

=== Replacement ===
As the oldest trees turned 100, they reached the end of their stated expected lifespan, although scientific research has shown that the trees could live as much as five hundred years. As early as 2013, ASU's grounds services department was planning to replace the palms with new Mexican fan palms in phases. The installation of replacement fan palms was projected to require a crane, increasing costs. However, a crane could not be used on Palm Walk because a utility tunnel runs underneath the mall.

By 2016, university landscapers had changed their plans to install date palms instead. Unlike the existing Mexican fan palms, date palms would offer an increased shade canopy, which had been requested by students, as well as dates for harvesting. Date palms were not new to ASU. In 2013, the Tempe campus had 65 date palms, and the university already maintained a germplasm and 138 additional trees in a grove on the Polytechnic campus, selling the dates harvested to the public. In July 2016, the first 35 trees of approximately 18–20 feet (5.5–6.1 m), the largest size that could be installed without a crane, were planted at the southern end of the mall after being purchased from groves in the Coachella Valley of California. Originally planned as a three-phase project continuing into 2018, work completed in late 2017. The trees produce Medjool dates.

== PalmWalk.com ==
In 2005, a Hot or Not–style rating site, PalmWalk.com, featured pictures of female students photographed on the campus walkway and asked users to rate their appearance. The site drew the ire of students due to the nature of the work, as pictures were taken of women without their knowledge or consent. While the website's owners hid their identity through the nature of the web domain, they also stated that they respected the rights of the individuals posted, and would remove any photographs upon request.

Student feedback was negative, with The State Press stating that it was not reflective of the university's culture of being known for having attractive women. The site also garnered attention from university officials and police, due to issues with potential copyright violations since the photos were posted without the consent of the university. However, as the website poster was taking the photos in public, there was no violation of privacy since there is no expectation of privacy in a public location. A counter website, Palmshock.com, was eventually formed, allowing for people to vent their frustrations over the site.
