= Ayers Saint Gross =

American architect

Ayers Saint Gross, Architects and Planners is an architectural firm in Maryland, U.S. specializing in master plans and building designs for higher education institutions. The firm is described as maintaining “a narrower focus on college and university work than any other in the country.”

Since the 1980s, Ayers Saint Gross has become a long-term adviser to universities including Harvard, Johns Hopkins and the University of North Carolina at Chapel Hill. The Firm’s academic projects range from campus master plans to classroom buildings, laboratories, performing arts centers and law and business schools.

The firm employs about 200 professionals and is organized into studios specializing in planning, academic and student life facilities, landscape architecture, environmental signage and graphic design.

Based in Baltimore, the firm was known for institutional and residential projects until the 1980s when it specialized in the "design and planning for non-profit institutions, with a specific focus on higher education." The current president is Luanne Greene, FAIA, LEED AP.

== History ==
Ayers Saint Gross is the successor firm to Sill, Buckler & Fenhagen, founded in 1912 and known as the designer of Baltimore City College, the third oldest public high school in America, founded downtown in 1839, and having occupied eight different locations in its now 175-year-old history. Some of City College's earlier buildings were landmark structures in their era, built by several famous local architects of the time. Buckler & Fenhagen won the national competition in the 1920s with their design for their landmark stone Collegiate Gothic "Castle on the Hill" on the highest hilltop in the northeast section of Baltimore overlooking the downtown skyline to the south. Built at a cost of over $2.4 million, during 1924-1928, the "Castle" still serves a magnet college preparatory high school that focuses on the humanities, liberal arts, social studies and the classics and is traditionally one of the best performing student body in the state. As a humorous note, carved limestone faces of both architects are placed as small stone "gargoyles" on either side of a large central window over the front entrance.

In 1938, the original partners hired Richard “Dick” Ayers, whose employment was interrupted by World War II when he served in the U.S. Navy and toured Japan as a member of the "Strategic Bombing Survey". Ayers returned to Buckler and Fenhagen after the war and in 1955, he and Julius Meyer took over the firm. They were joined later by Kelsey Saint, a Yale classmate, and the partners went on to design Shriver Hall, the Newton White Athletic Center and the Milton S. Eisenhower Library on the "Homewood" campus of The Johns Hopkins University. In 1984, Adam Gross was also recruited to the Firm. Under his leadership, "Ayers Saint Gross" became one of the most honored design studios in Maryland. Gross and principal Jim Wheeler, who joined the firm in 1987, repositioned the firm to focus on college and university work. They based this shift on the growing need for campus design expertise in response to the children of "baby boomers" flooding higher education. That strategy led to the firm’s rapid growth.

The firm opened offices in Baltimore, Maryland, Tempe, Arizona, and Washington, D.C. as a result of various work projects for universities in those locations. Today, the Baltimore office of "Ayers Saint Gross" is headquartered in an old Procter and Gamble soap-making factory, renovated into an office park named "Tide Point" on the southside of the City’s "Inner Harbor".

== Work ==
Projects include the new National Library for George Washington at Mount Vernon, near Alexandria, Virginia, the master plan for the re-use of the historic St. Elizabeths Hospital campus in Washington, D.C., D.C. Department of Transportation and D.C. Office of Planning Krouse, Sarah. “St. Elizabeths project wins some, loses some,” "Washington Business Journal", July 1, 2011 and master plans for Virginia Commonwealth University, Kapsidelis, Karin. “VCU begins work on new master plan,” November 11, 2011. the University of Southern California health sciences campus, Fried, Ina. “Looking ahead to 2035, USC maps out plan for campus,” "The USC Weekly", March 5, 2010 and new campuses in Asia.

== Sustainable design ==
In 2011, "Ayers Saint Gross" was ranked by "Engineering News Record" as 33 out of the "Top 100 Green Design Firms". Engineering News Record Its projects are designed to meet standards set by the U.S. Green Building Council under its "Leadership in Energy and Environmental Design", (LEED) program. About 70 percent of the firm’s architects are LEED-accredited. Landscape Online "Ayers Saint Gross" designs to LEED Silver standards and has exceeded this rating on some projects, such as the Thomas Jefferson Visitors Center at "Monticello". Thomas Jefferson Foundation At Emory University, the architects have designed several freshman residence halls to make use of rainwater harvesting and condensation reclamation. Carlson, Scott. “New Buildings at Emory U. and Furman U. Use Innovative Technology for Sustainability.” "Chronicle of Higher Education". May 23, 2008 King, W. Scott, “Come Rain or Shine,” "Architect" magazine, September 2008. The firm has recently designed the John and Frances Angelos Law Center for the University of Baltimore, undertaken in partnership with Behnisch Architekten of Stuttgart in Germany, to be the first completely LEED Platinum-certified law school building in the United States. CityBiz Real Estate, February 15, 2012

== Notable plans and buildings ==
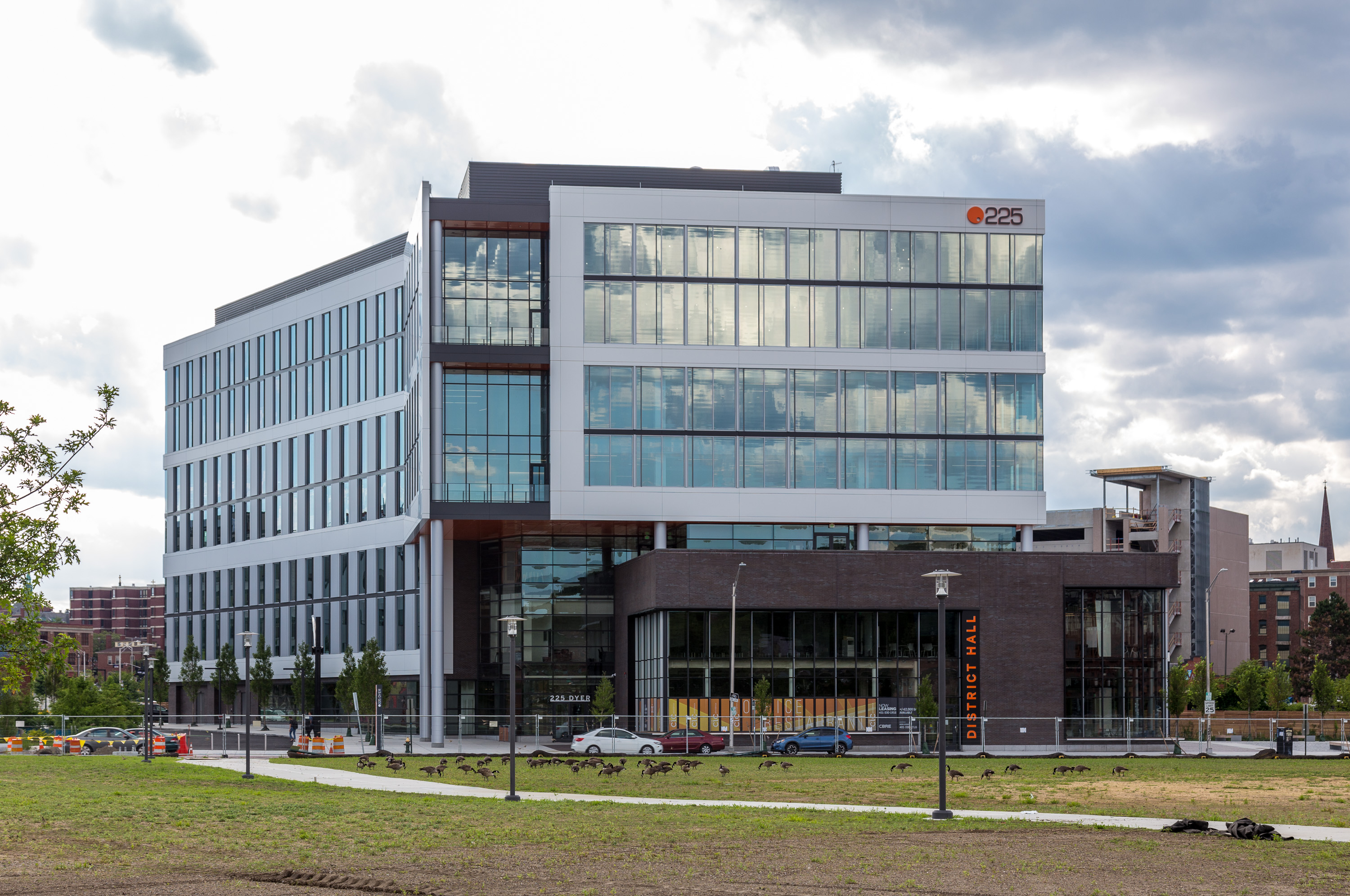
Wexford Innovation Center in Providence (2019)

- Bloomberg Center for Physics and Astronomy, Johns Hopkins University, Baltimore, Maryland, 1990
- Johns Hopkins University "Campus Master Plan", Baltimore, Maryland, 2000
- Darden Graduate School of Business Administration, University of Virginia, Charlottesville, Virginia, 2002 “Darden Graduate School of Business Administration,” 2002
- University of North Carolina at Chapel Hill, "Campus Master Plan", Chapel Hill, North Carolina, 2006
- School of Nursing, Duke University, Durham, North Carolina, 2007
- Rutgers School of Law-Camden, Camden, NJ, 2008 Camden @ Rutgers School of Law
- Harvard University Allston Campus, Boston, Massachusetts, 2008 Ni, Nan and Viswanathan, Vidya B., “Harvard Shows Revised Allston Plan to Residents,” The Harvard Crimson, October 23, 2008.
- Missouri Botanical Garden Jack C. Taylor Visitor Center, 2022
- Wilmer Eye Institute, Johns Hopkins University, Baltimore, Maryland, 2009 Gunts, Edward. “New Wilmer Building Boosts Eye Research,” "Baltimore Sun", June 9, 2009
- Dietsch, Deborah K. (April 12, 2009). "Monticello's New Visitor Center". The Washington Times. Washington, DC. Archived from the original on January 6, 2014 – via HighBeam Research.
- Art and Design Building, George Mason University, Fairfax, Virginia, 2010
- Freshman residence halls at Emory University, Atlanta, Georgia, 2007-2014 Carlson, Scott. “New Buildings at Emory U. and Furman U. Use Innovative Technology for Sustainability.” *"Chronicle of Higher Education". May 23, 2008 King, W. Scott, “Come Rain or Shine,” "Architect" magazine, September 2008.
- "Innovation District Master Plan" (including the Wexford Innovation Center) Providence, Rhode Island, 2017-2019
