= Patricia Mueller =

American educator and politician

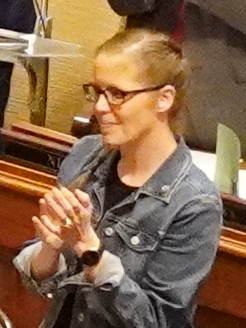

Member of the Minnesota House of Representatives from the 23B district
- Incumbent
- Assumed office January 5, 2021
- Preceded by: Jeanne Poppe

Personal details
- Born: March 28, 1981 (age 45) Oakdale, Minnesota, U.S.
- Party: Republican
- Spouse: Dan
- Education: Winona State University (B.S.); Minnesota State University Moorhead (M.S.) (Ed. D.)
- Occupation: Teacher; Legislator
- Website: Government website Campaign website

Patricia Mueller (born March 28, 1981) is an American politician serving in the Minnesota House of Representatives since 2021. A member of the Republican Party of Minnesota, Mueller represents District 23B in southwestern Minnesota, which includes the city of Austin and parts of Freeborn, Mower and Steele Counties.

== Early life and education ==
Mueller was born and raised in Oakdale, Minnesota and graduated from Tartan Senior High School. She attended Winona State University, earning her B.S. in English education in 2003. She enrolled at Minnesota State University Moorhead, where she earned an M.S. in curriculum instruction in 2018 and an Ed. D. in 2022.

After graduating, Mueller worked as a teacher. In 2007, she and her husband moved to rural China to teach English as part of a mission trip. Mueller cites her time abroad as part of her inspiration to become active in politics. Mueller moved to Austin, Minnesota in 2015, where she taught at Austin High School.

== Minnesota House of Representatives ==
Mueller was elected to the Minnesota House of Representatives in 2020 and was reelected in 2022. She defeated eight-term DFL incumbent Jeanne Poppe after being recruited by local members of the Republican Party to run for the seat, which had been held by the DFL since 2004 but voted for Donald Trump in the 2016 presidential election. In 2022, Mueller defeated former Austin mayor and police officer Tom Stiehm in a race that attracted considerable state media attention.

Mueller serves on the Education Policy and Public Safety Finance and Policy Committees.

=== Political positions ===
Mueller has called herself a "constitutional conservative with some libertarian leanings". She has stressed the importance of considering the needs of rural Minnesota.

Mueller signed a letter condemning violence after the January 6 attack on the Capitol, but also said that "we will never know" whether Joe Biden is "the real president".

Mueller opposes using state funds for abortion and supports a ban on all abortions after 12 weeks unless the mother's life is in danger. She supports a constitutional amendment to remove state protections for abortion access.

Mueller opposes red flag gun control laws.

In September 2021, Mueller spoke in support of Afghan refugees settling in Minnesota:

As they come from a horrible, impossible place, they have experiences that can teach us and make our communities richer and make our lives better as well.

In 2022, Mueller introduced legislation to speed up the licensing process for substitute teachers in response to workforce shortages caused by the COVID-19 pandemic.

Mueller has opposed state action to provide menstrual products for students in Minnesota public schools, arguing it should be up to local districts.

== Electoral history ==
2020 Minnesota State House - District 27B
Party	Candidate	Votes	%
Republican	Patricia Mueller	9,907	51.53
Democratic (DFL)	Jeanne Poppe (incumbent)	9,295	48.35
Write-in		22	0.11
Total votes		19,224	100.0
Republican gain from Democratic (DFL)			

2022 Minnesota State House - District 23B
Party	Candidate	Votes	%
Republican	Patricia Mueller (incumbent)	8,336	55.02
Democratic (DFL)	Thomas A. Stiehm	6,786	44.79
Write-in		28	0.18
Total votes		15,150	100.0
Republican hold			

2024 Minnesota State House - District 23B
Party	Candidate	Votes	%
Republican	Patricia Mueller (incumbent)	11,465	58.34
Democratic (DFL)	Joseph Pacovsky	8,174	41.60
Write-in		12	0.06
Total votes		19,651	100.0
Republican hold			

== Personal life ==
Muller lives in Austin, Minnesota with her husband, Dan, whom she met while studying at Winona State University. Dan was a member of the city of Austin's Human Rights Commission from 2017 to 2021, when the City Council voted to remove him due to his association with the Minnesota Family Council.
