= Spring Green, Wisconsin =

- Village
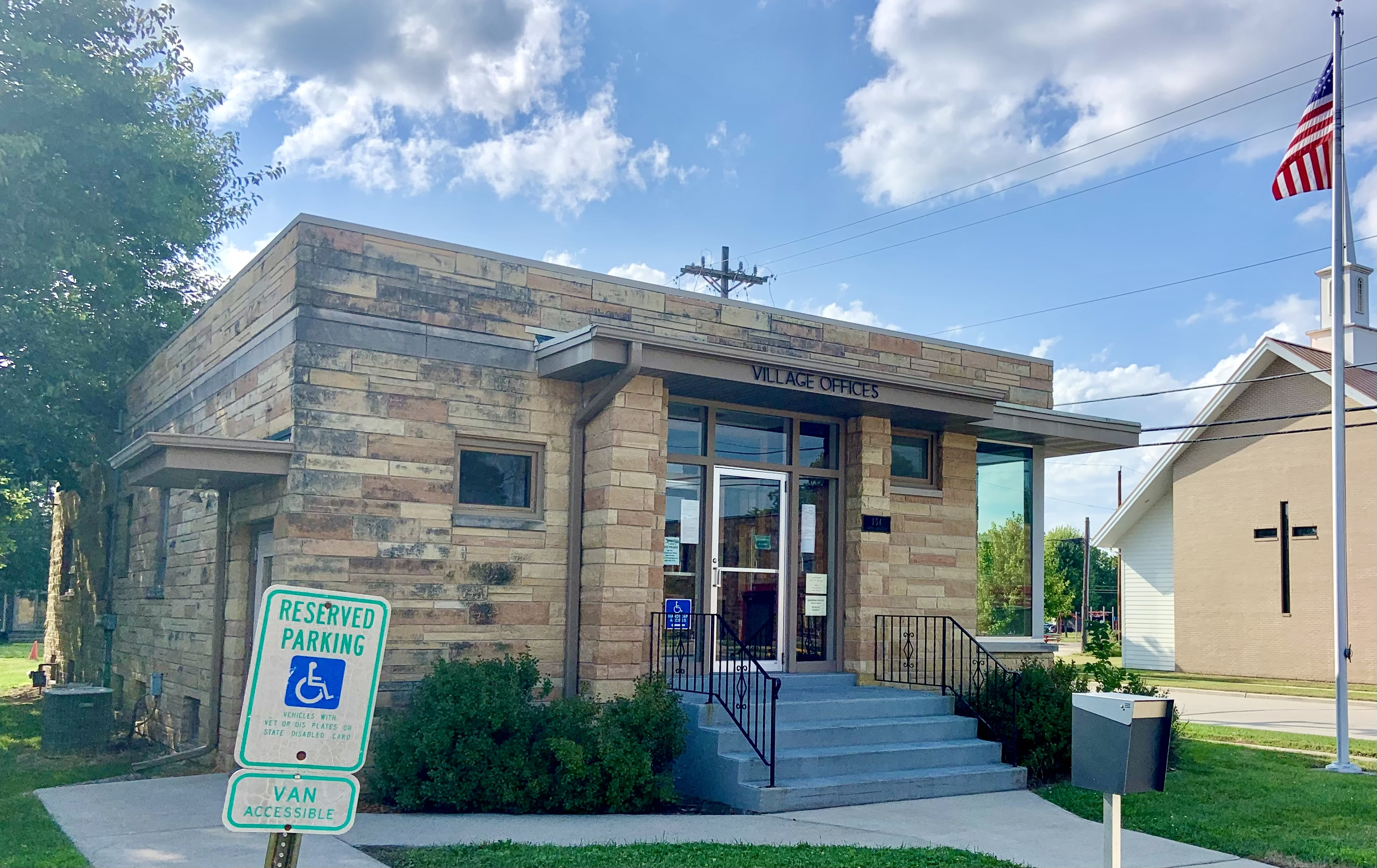
- Village hall

- Location of Spring Green in Sauk County, Wisconsin.
- Coordinates: 43°11′2″N 90°6′12″W
- Country: United States
- State: Wisconsin
- County: Sauk

Area
  - Total: 1.67 sq mi (4.32 km^{2})
  - Land: 1.67 sq mi (4.32 km^{2})
  - Water: 0 sq mi (0.00 km^{2})
- Elevation: 725 ft (221 m)

Population (2020)
  - Total: 1,566
  - Density: 982.8/sq mi (379.45/km^{2})
- Time zone: UTC-6 (Central (CST))
  - Summer (DST): UTC-5 (CDT)
- Area code: 608
- FIPS code: 55-76050
- GNIS feature ID: 1574650
- Website: springgreen.wi.gov/Pages/home.aspx

Spring Green is a village in Sauk County, Wisconsin, United States. The population was 1,566 at the 2020 census. The village is located within the Town of Spring Green. It is perhaps best known for the architect Frank Lloyd Wright's estate Taliesin and related tourism.

== Geography ==
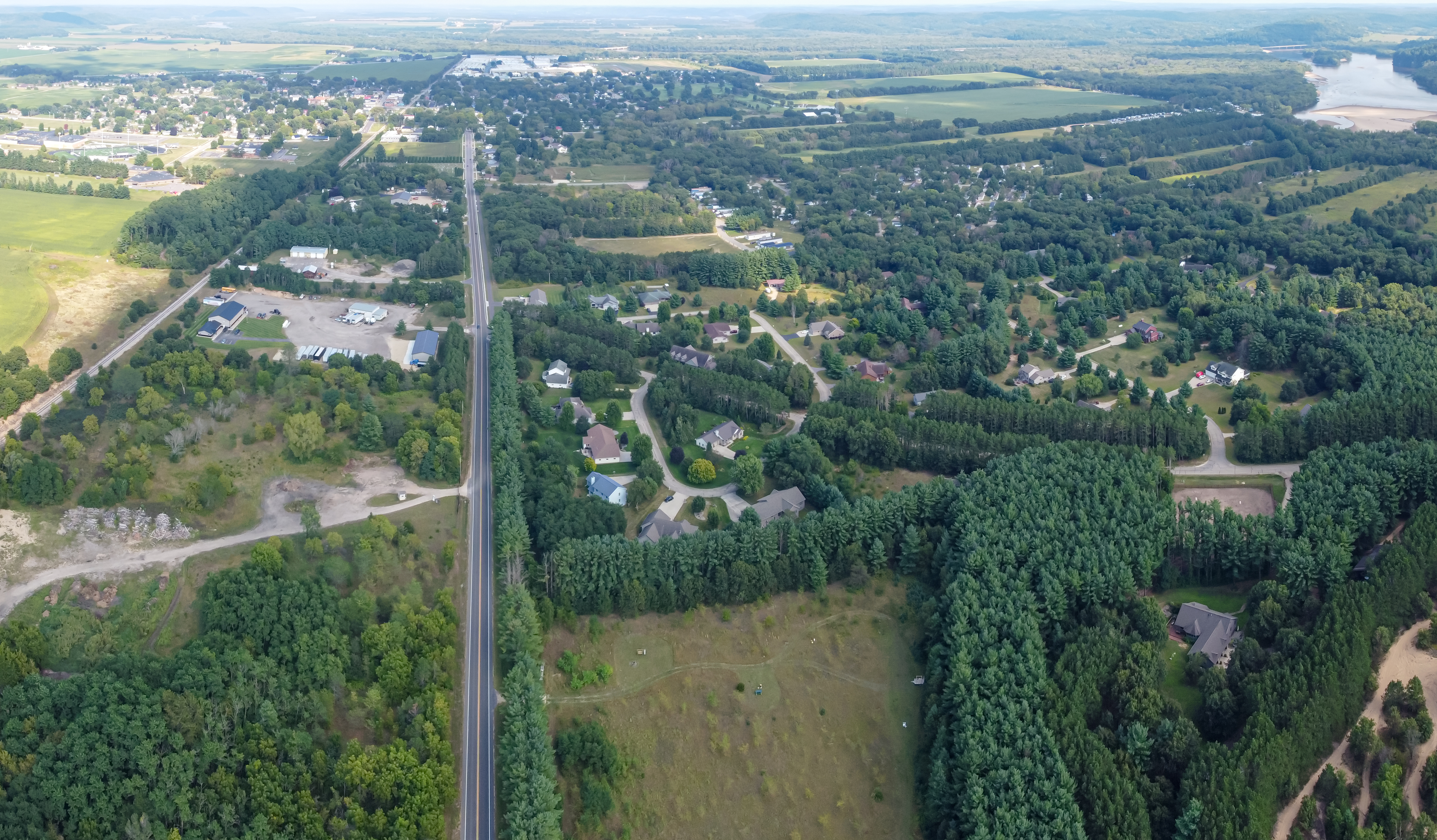

Spring Green is located at 43°10′38″N 90°04′02″W (43.177268, -90.067277).

According to the United States Census Bureau, the village has a total area of 1.80 square miles (4.66 km^{2}), all land. The Wisconsin River runs along the southern edge of the village.

== Demographics ==
Historical population
Census	Pop.	Note	%±
1870	422		—
1880	450		6.6%
1890	625		38.9%
1900	621		−0.6%
1910	730		17.6%
1920	690		−5.5%
1930	779		12.9%
1940	868		11.4%
1950	1,064		22.6%
1960	1,146		7.7%
1970	1,199		4.6%
1980	1,265		5.5%
1990	1,283		1.4%
2000	1,444		12.5%
2010	1,628		12.7%
2020	1,566		−3.8%
U.S. Decennial Census

=== 2010 census ===
As of the census of 2010, there were 1,628 people, 690 households, and 433 families living in the village. The population density was 904.4 inhabitants per square mile (349.2/km^{2}). There were 753 housing units at an average density of 418.3 per square mile (161.5/km^{2}). The racial makeup of the village was 97.5% White, 0.6% African American, 0.2% Native American, 0.1% Asian, 0.1% from other races, and 1.6% from two or more races. Hispanic or Latino of any race were 0.8% of the population.

There were 690 households, of which 31.2% had children under the age of 18 living with them, 50.4% were married couples living together, 8.6% had a female householder with no husband present, 3.8% had a male householder with no wife present, and 37.2% were non-families. 33.3% of all households were made up of individuals, and 18.6% had someone living alone who was 65 years of age or older. The average household size was 2.27 and the average family size was 2.88.

The median age in the village was 42.5 years. 24.3% of residents were under the age of 18; 5% were between the ages of 18 and 24; 24.5% were from 25 to 44; 26.7% were from 45 to 64; and 19.5% were 65 years of age or older. The gender makeup of the village was 47.9% male and 52.1% female.

=== 2000 census ===
As of the census of 2000, there were 1,444 people, 585 households, and 372 families living in the village. The population density was 1,097.6 people per square mile (422.4/km^{2}). There were 624 housing units at an average density of 474.3 per square mile (182.5/km^{2}). The racial makeup of the village was 99.24% White, 0.14% Black or African American, 0.14% Native American, 0.07% Asian, 0.07% Pacific Islander, 0.07% from other races, and 0.28% from two or more races. 0.14% of the population were Hispanic or Latino of any race.

There were 585 households, out of which 32.1% had children under the age of 18 living with them, 55.0% were married couples living together, 6.3% had a female householder with no husband present, and 36.4% were non-families. 31.5% of all households were made up of individuals, and 15.9% had someone living alone who was 65 years of age or older. The average household size was 2.38 and the average family size was 2.99.

In the village, the population was spread out, with 25.5% under the age of 18, 5.9% from 18 to 24, 28.6% from 25 to 44, 21.8% from 45 to 64, and 18.2% who were 65 years of age or older. The median age was 39 years. For every 100 females, there were 90.3 males. For every 100 females age 18 and over, there were 83.0 males.

The median income for a household in the village was $45,000, and the median income for a family was $51,806. Males had a median income of $36,597 versus $26,296 for females. The per capita income for the village was $21,462. About 3.2% of families and 6.1% of the population were below the poverty line, including 5.4% of those under age 18 and 15.2% of those age 65 or over.

== Relationship with Frank Lloyd Wright ==
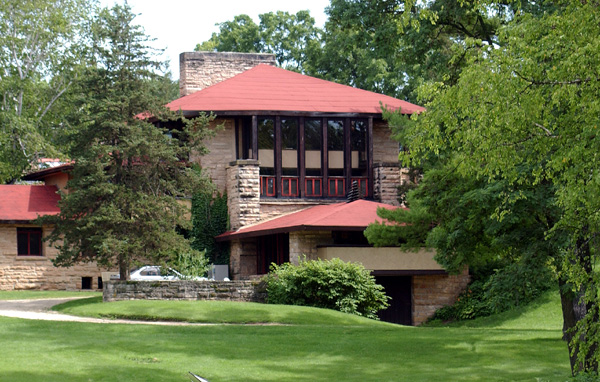
The Hillside Home School by Frank Lloyd Wright at Taliesin

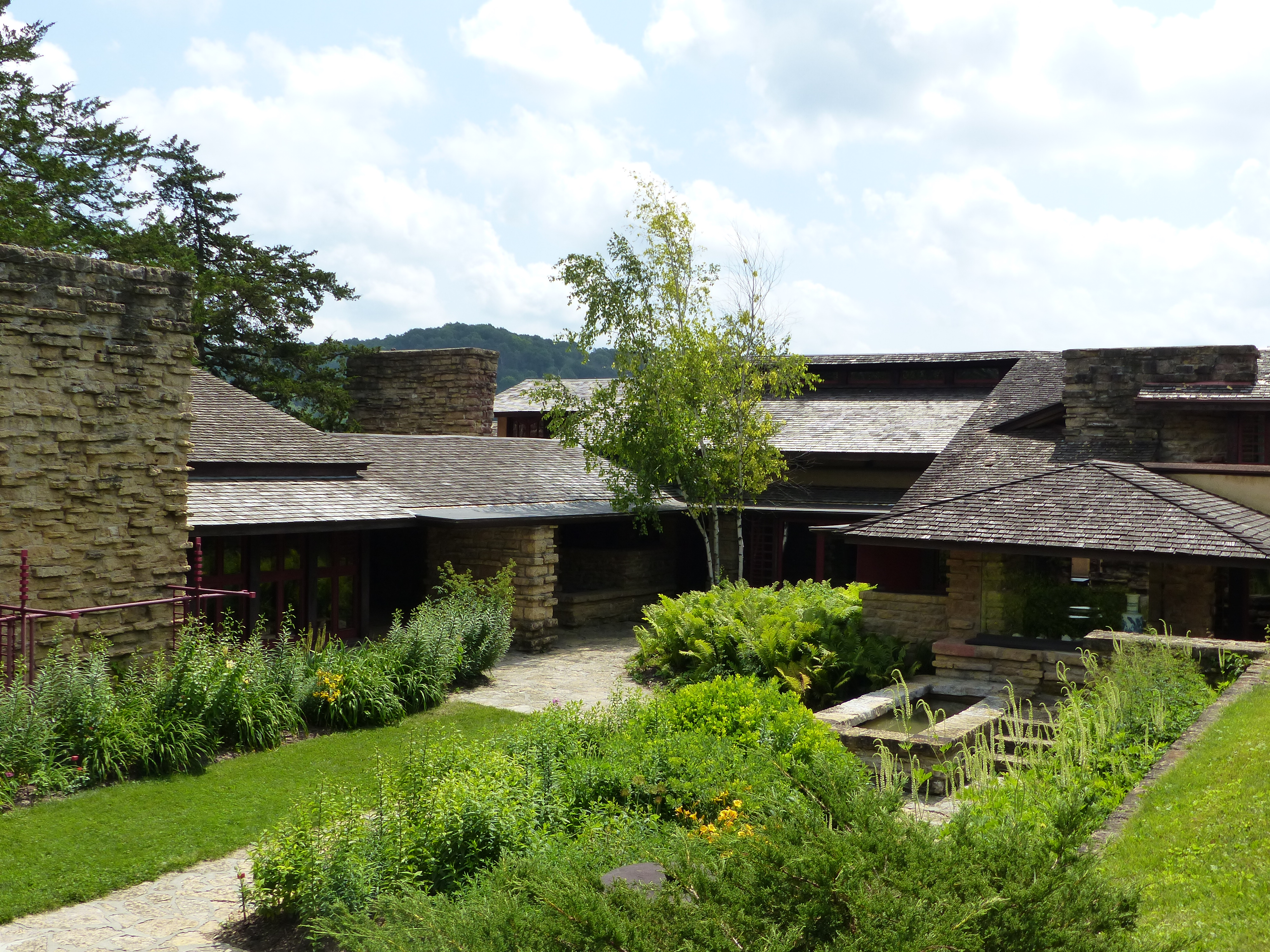
Taliesin

The world-renowned architect Frank Lloyd Wright was born in nearby Richland Center, studied in Madison, and spent summers and other times near Spring Green with his mother's family, the Lloyd-Joneses of Wyoming Valley. He became identified with Spring Green when he built the first Taliesin studio nearby in 1911 after leaving Oak Park, Illinois, to live with Mamah Borthwick, the wife of an erstwhile client. The disapproval of many area residents only intensified after a disastrous fire and the murder of Borthwick along with her children and several workmen in 1914. On the other hand, some Spring Green craftsmen were among Wright's most trusted and lifelong favorites.

Taliesin was rebuilt again in 1925 and became a local landmark. Wright was buried in the Lloyd-Jones family cemetery next to Unity Chapel near Taliesin and Spring Green from his death in 1959 until 1985, when his remains were controversially reinterred at Taliesin West in Arizona. Growing worldwide appreciation of Wright's legacy has brought increased attention as well as tourism to the Spring Green area. Architects from the Frank Lloyd Wright Foundation, along with Wright-trained architects native to Wisconsin, have designed numerous homes and commercial and civic buildings in Spring Green and the surrounding area.

== Attractions ==
- Taliesin, the summer home and school of architect Frank Lloyd Wright, including the Hillside Home School
- American Players Theatre, classical (Shakespeare, etc.) and modern theater, revolving repertory in indoor and outdoor theaters, June–October
- The House on the Rock tourist museum

== Education ==
It is in River Valley School District.

== Media ==
- Voice of the River Valley, A guide to people & events that inspire, inform and enrich life in the Lower Wisconsin and Sugar-Pecatonica River Basins
- The Spring Green Home News

== Notable people ==
- Svetlana Alliluyeva, daughter of Soviet dictator Joseph Stalin
- Anne Baxter, Academy Award-winning actress
- Evan Alfred Evans, United States federal court judge
- Isaac C. Evans, Wisconsin State Representative
- Fred Gerber, Jr., South Dakota State Representative
- Carie Graves, Olympic gold medalist, head coach of the Harvard Crimson and Texas Longhorns women's crew teams
- Richard Haas, muralist
- Jenkin Lloyd Jones, Unitarian missionary and minister
- Randall Duk Kim, actor
- Robert McCutchin, Wisconsin State Representative
- Jane Peyton, actress
- John J. Sliter, Minnesota State Representative
- Anthony Weston, philosopher
- Alonzo Wilcox, Wisconsin State Representative
- Frank Lloyd Wright, architect and builder of Taliesin

== Images ==
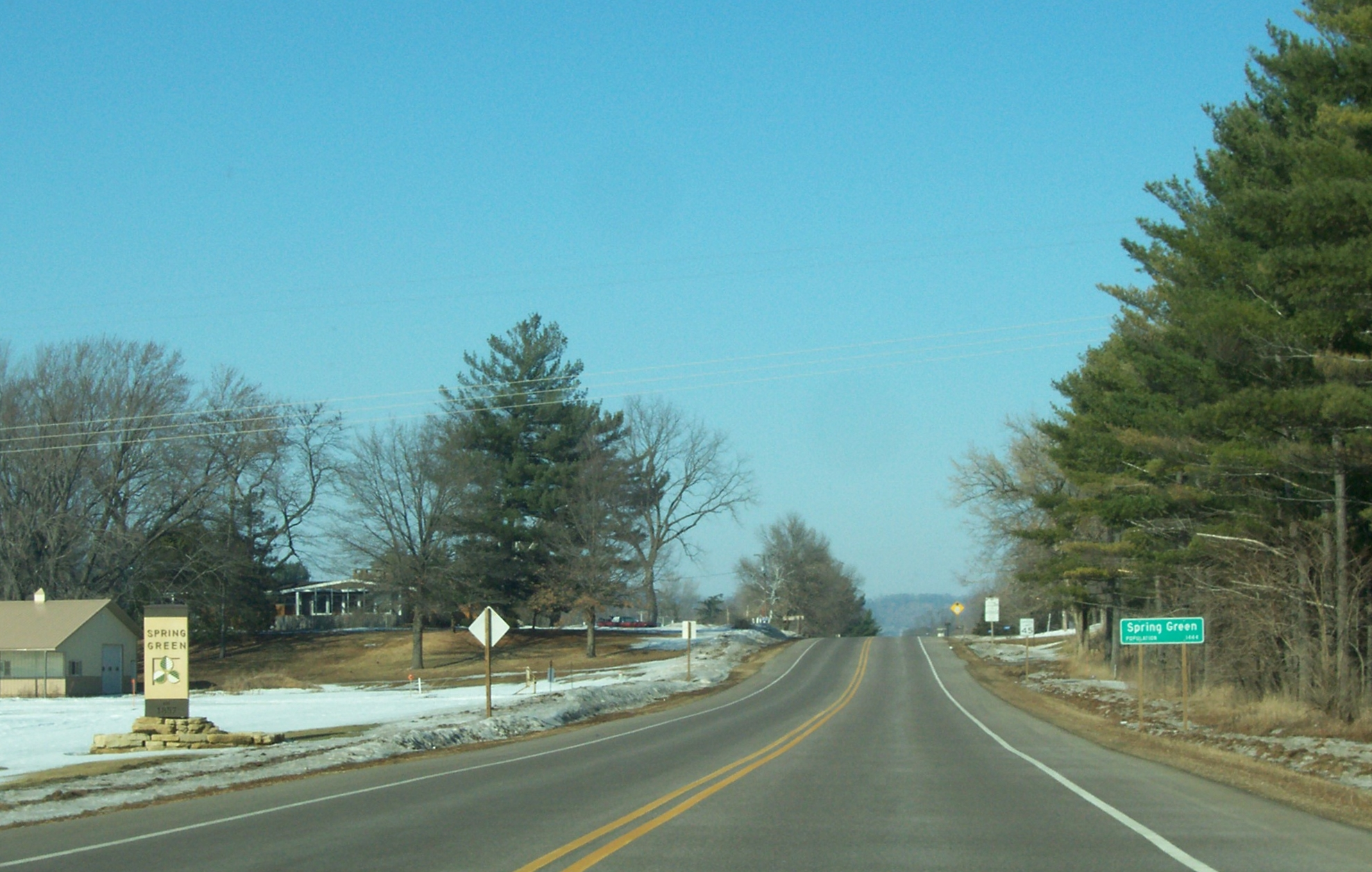
Welcome sign on Wis. Hwy. 23

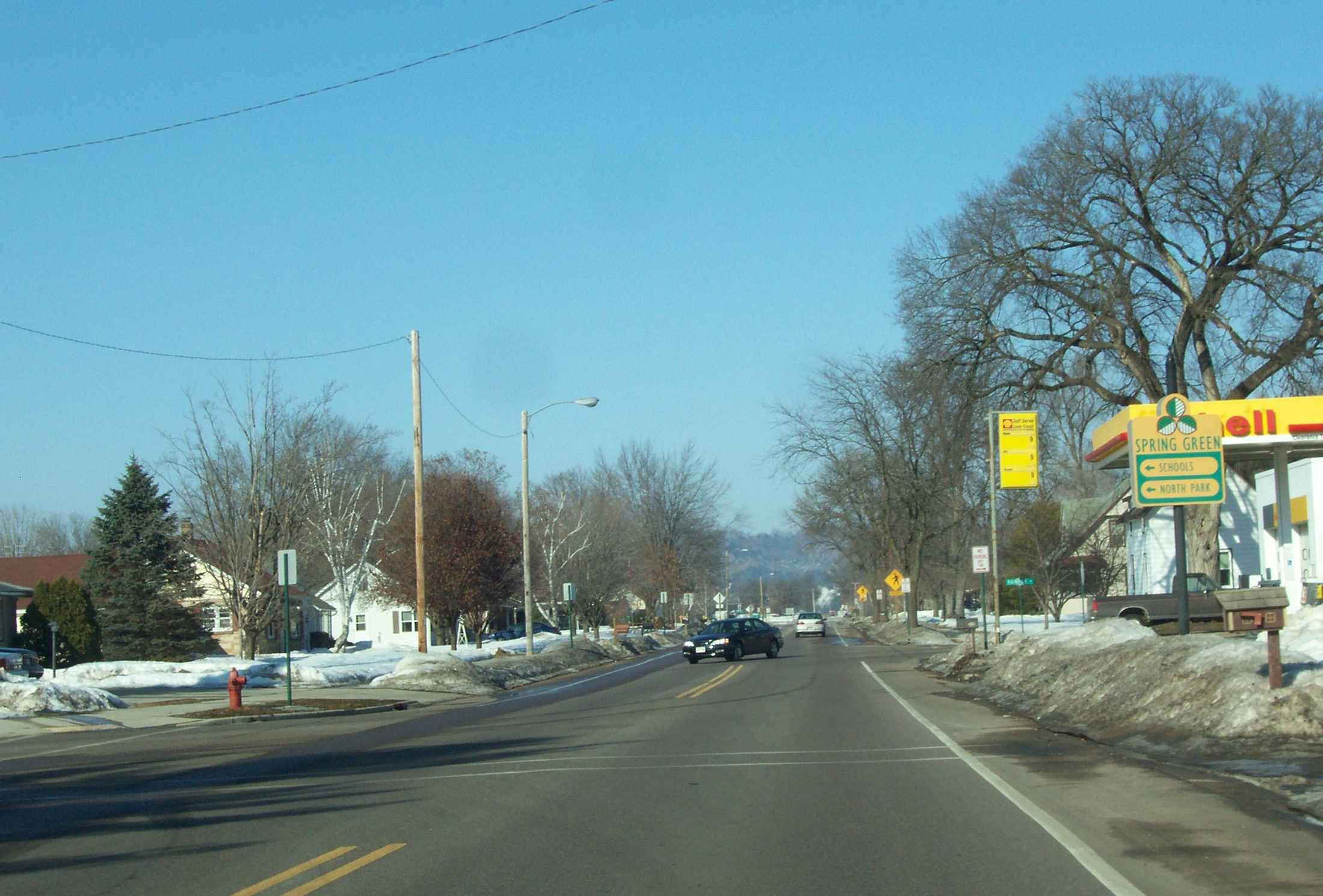
Looking north in Spring Green

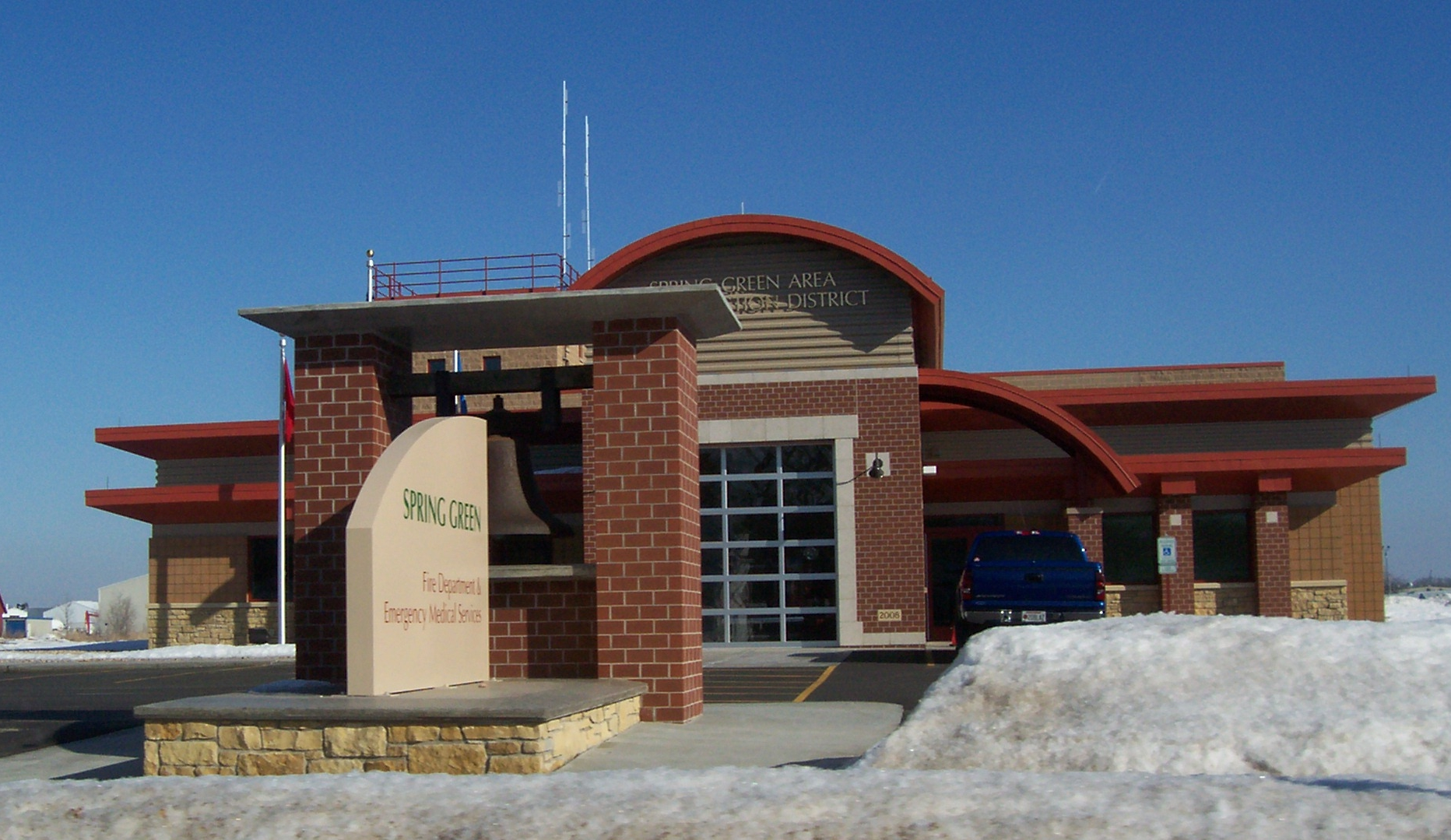
Fire station
