= Houston Public Library (Minnesota) =

Public library in Houston

- 43°45′47″N 91°34′2″W
- Location: 202 E. Cedar St. Houston, MN 55943-0037

Other information
- Director: Elizabeth Gibson-Gasset
- Website: https://houston.lib.mn.us

The Houston Public Library is a public library in Houston, Minnesota. It is a member of Southeastern Libraries Cooperating, the SE Minnesota library region.
