= Jeanne Poppe =

American politician

Member of the Minnesota House of Representatives from the 27B district
- In office January 4, 2005 – January 5, 2021
- Preceded by: Jeff Anderson
- Succeeded by: Patricia Mueller

Personal details
- Born: July 6, 1957 (age 69) Houston, Minnesota, U.S.
- Party: Minnesota Democratic–Farmer–Labor Party
- Spouse: Robert Vilt
- Children: 3
- Education: University of Wisconsin-River Falls; Winona State University
- Profession: educator, counselor, legislator

Jeanne E. Poppe (born July 6, 1957) is a Minnesota politician and former member of the Minnesota House of Representatives. A member of the Minnesota Democratic–Farmer–Labor Party (DFL), she represented District 27B, which includes all or portions of Dodge, Freeborn, and Mower counties in the southeastern part of the state. She is an educator and counselor at Riverland Community College, with campuses in Albert Lea, Austin and Owatonna.

== Early life, education, and career ==
Poppe was born in Houston, Minnesota and attended Houston High School where she graduated in 1975. She graduated from the University of Wisconsin in River Falls, receiving her B.A. in Sociology and Criminal Justice in 1980. She earned her M.S. in Counseling from Winona State University in Winona in 1985.

She has been a college counselor at Riverland Community College since 1999, also serving as president of the Minnesota State College Faculty Counselors Association from 2002 to 2004. Prior to her work as a counselor, she was the college's director of admissions from 1995 to 1999, and the women's center director from 1993 to 1995. She was a workforce career counselor for the Private Industry Council from 1989 to 1993, and a senior citizens' paralegal for Southern Minnesota Regional Legal Services from 1984 to 1989.

Active in her local community through the years, Poppe served on the Austin City Council (Ward 2) from 1994 to 2002, and was secretary of the Austin Human Rights Commission from 2002 to 2004. She has been a trustee of the Austin Area Foundation since 2003, and a member of the Austin Area League of Women Voters since 1987.

== Minnesota House of Representatives ==
=== Elections ===
Poppe ran unsuccessfully in 2002 against Rep. Jeff Anderson. She was first elected in 2004 defeating Anderson in a close race. She was re-elected in 2006, 2008, 2010, 2012, and 2014, 2016, and 2018 before being unseated in 2020.

2020 Minnesota State Representative - House 27B
Party	Candidate	Votes	%	±%
Republican	Patricia Mueller	9907	51.53	+8.99
Democratic (DFL)	Jeanne Poppe (Incumbent)	9295	48.35	−9.03
Write-in		22	0.11	+0.04

2018 Minnesota State Representative- House 27B
Party	Candidate	Votes	%	±%
Democratic (DFL)	Jeanne Poppe (Incumbent)	8523	57.38	+3.77
Republican	Christine Green	6319	42.54	−3.76
Write-in		11	0.07	-0.01

2016 Minnesota State Representative- House 27B
Party	Candidate	Votes	%	±%
Democratic (DFL)	Jeanne Poppe (Incumbent)	9485	53.61	−0.49
Republican	Dennis R. Schminke	8192	46.30	+0.50
Write-in		15	0.08	-0.01

2014 Minnesota State Representative- House 27B
Party	Candidate	Votes	%	±%
Democratic (DFL)	Jeanne Poppe (Incumbent)	6498	54.10	−8.68
Republican	Dennis Schminke	5501	45.80	+8.68
Write-in		11	0.09	-0.01

2012 Minnesota State Representative- House 27B
Party	Candidate	Votes	%	±%
Democratic (DFL)	Jeanne Poppe (Incumbent)	11486	62.78	+5.13
Republican	Nathan Neitzell	6792	37.12	−5.12
Write-in		19	0.10	-0.01

2010 Minnesota State Representative- House 27B
Party	Candidate	Votes	%	±%
Democratic (DFL)	Jeanne Poppe (Incumbent)	7801	57.65	−8.32
Republican	Jennifer Gumbel	5716	42.24	+8.35
Write-in		15	0.11	-0.02

2008 Minnesota State Representative- House 27B
Party	Candidate	Votes	%	±%
Democratic (DFL)	Jeanne Poppe (Incumbent)	11844	65.97	+9.64
Republican	Brian Thiel	6085	33.89	−9.64
Write-in		24	0.13	-0.01

2006 Minnesota State Representative- House 27B
Party	Candidate	Votes	%	±%
Democratic (DFL)	Jeanne Poppe (Incumbent)	8529	56.33	+4.74
Republican	Jeff Anderson	6591	43.53	−4.81
Write-in		21	0.14	+0.07

2004 Minnesota State Representative- House 27B
Party	Candidate	Votes	%	±%
Democratic (DFL)	Jeanne Poppe	9777	51.59	+2.87
Republican	Jeff Anderson (Incumbent)	9162	48.34	−2.86
Write-in		13	0.07	-0.01

2002 Minnesota State Representative- House 27B
Party	Candidate	Votes	%	±%
Republican	Jeff Anderson (Incumbent)	7777	51.20	+2.86
Democratic (DFL)	Jeanne Poppe	7399	48.72	−2.94
Write-in		12	0.08	N/A

=== Committee assignments ===
For the 89th Minnesota Legislature, Poppe is a part of:

- Agriculture Finance Committee (DFL Lead)
- Agriculture Policy Committee
- Capital Investment Committee
- Environment and Natural Resources Policy and Finance Committee
- Ways and Means Committee

For the 88th Minnesota Legislature, Poppe was part of:

- Agriculture Policy (Chair) Committee
- Environment, Natural Resources and Agriculture Finance Committee
- Higher Education Finance and Policy Committee
- Ways and Means Committee

For the 87th Minnesota Legislature, Poppe was part of:

- Agriculture and Rural Development Policy and Finance Committee
- Higher Education Policy and Finance Committee
- Redistricting Committee

For the 86th Minnesota Legislature, Poppe was part of:

- Finance Subcommittee: Higher Education and Workforce Development Finance and Policy Division
- Bioscience and Workforce Development Policy and Oversight Division Committee
- Finance Subcommittee: State Government Finance Division
- State and Local Government Operations Reform, Technology and Elections Committee

For the 85th Minnesota Legislature, Poppe was part of:

- Finance Committee
- Finance Subcommittee: Agriculture, Rural Economies and Veterans Affairs Finance Division
- Finance Subcommittee: Education Finance and Economic Competitiveness Finance Division: Higher Education and Work Force Development Policy and Finance Division
- Finance Subcommittee: State Government Finance Division
- Governmental Operations, Reform, Technology and Elections Committee

For the 84th Minnesota Legislature, Poppe was part of:

- Environment and Natural Resources Committee
- Local Government Committee
- Rules and Legislative Administration Committee

=== Tenure ===
Poppe was sworn in on January 4, 2005. She served in the 84th, 85th, 86th, 87th, 88th, 89th, 90th, and 91st Minnesota Legislatures.

== Personal life ==
Poppe resides in Austin, Minnesota, and was married to Bob Vilt who died July 13, 2017. They have three children, Lydia, Casey, Skyler.
