= Fred Gerber Jr. =

American politician

Fred Gerber Jr. was a member of the South Dakota House of Representatives.

== Biography ==
Gerber was born on May 1, 1870, in Spring Green, Wisconsin. He died on May 13, 1941, in Sioux Falls, South Dakota, and is buried in Worthing, South Dakota.

== Career ==
Gerber was a member of the House of Representatives from 1919 to 1922. He was a Republican.
