= Houston, Minnesota =

City in Minnesota, United States

- City
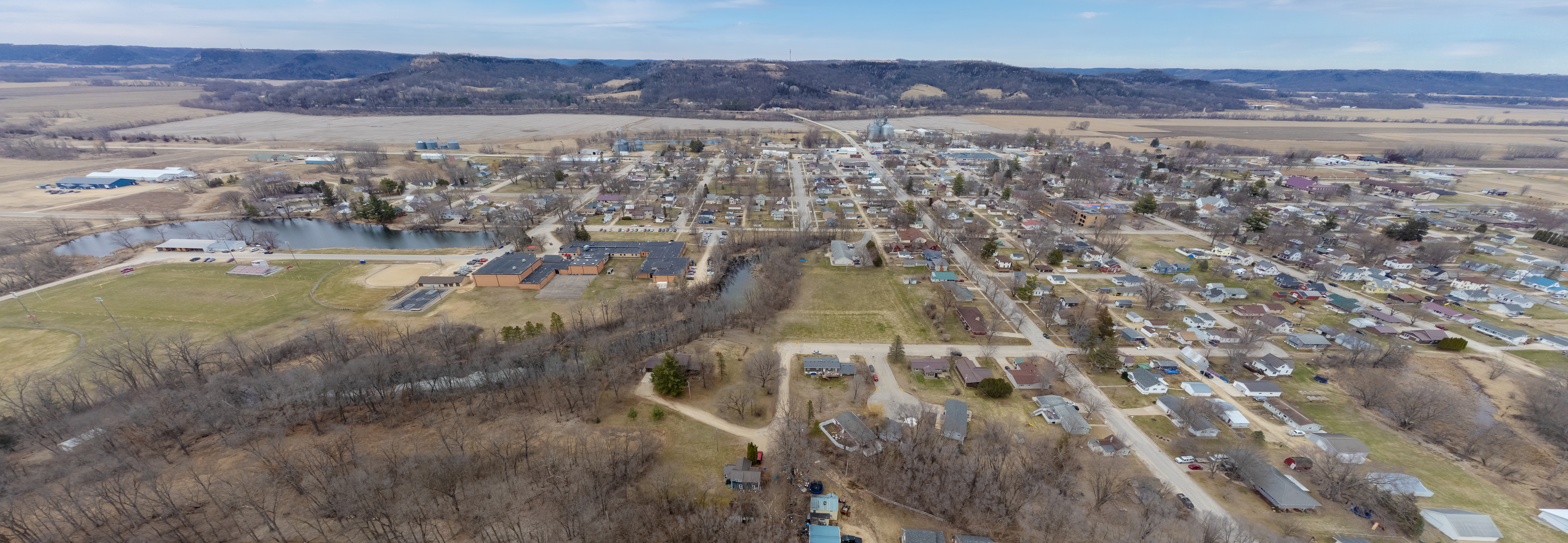
- Motto: "Mountains Of Minnesota"
- Location of Houston, Minnesota
- Coordinates: 43°45′25″N 91°34′14″W
- Country: United States
- State: Minnesota
- County: Houston
- Founded: 1874

Area
  - Total: 1.25 sq mi (3.24 km^{2})
  - Land: 1.23 sq mi (3.19 km^{2})
  - Water: 0.019 sq mi (0.05 km^{2})
- Elevation: 686 ft (209 m)

Population (2020)
  - Total: 997
  - Estimate (2022): 996
  - Density: 809.7/sq mi (312.62/km^{2})
- Time zone: UTC-6 (Central (CST))
  - Summer (DST): UTC-5 (CDT)
- ZIP code: 55943
- Area code: 507
- FIPS code: 27-30230
- GNIS feature ID: 2394425
- Website: houston.govoffice.com

Houston (/ˈhjuːstən/ HEW-stən) is a city in Houston County, Minnesota, United States. The population was 997 at the 2020 census.

== History ==
The community was named after Sam Houston, first president of the Republic of Texas.

In 1852, William McSpadden platted the original site of the Village of Houston. McSpadden had served under Sam Houston in the Mexican–American War. Pioneers followed him into the area and by 1854 there were stores and a school among the settlement's approximately 40 buildings.

Houston was incorporated in 1874.

=== 2007 flood ===
The 2007 Midwest flooding caused the Root River to rise to 19 feet (5.8 m), about a foot short of the height of the dike protecting the town, necessitating evacuation of the community.

== Geography ==
According to the United States Census Bureau, the city has an area of 0.95 square miles (2.46 km^{2}), of which 0.93 square miles (2.41 km^{2}) is land and 0.02 square miles (0.05 km^{2}) is water.

== Demographics ==
Historical population
Census	Pop.	Note	%±
1880	510		—
1890	536		5.1%
1900	542		1.1%
1910	700		29.2%
1920	778		11.1%
1930	794		2.1%
1940	977		23.0%
1950	973		−0.4%
1960	1,082		11.2%
1970	1,090		0.7%
1980	1,057		−3.0%
1990	1,013		−4.2%
2000	1,020		0.7%
2010	979		−4.0%
2020	997		1.8%
2022 (est.)	996		−0.1%
U.S. Decennial Census; 2020 Census

=== 2010 census ===
As of the census of 2010, there were 979 people, 418 households, and 239 families living in the city. The population density was 1,052.7 inhabitants per square mile (406.4/km^{2}). There were 456 housing units at an average density of 490.3 per square mile (189.3/km^{2}). The racial makeup of the city was 99.5% White, 0.4% Native American, and 0.1% from two or more races. Hispanic or Latino of any race were 0.1% of the population.

There were 418 households, of which 29.2% had children under the age of 18 living with them, 43.1% were married couples living together, 10.8% had a female householder with no husband present, 3.3% had a male householder with no wife present, and 42.8% were non-families. 39.0% of all households were made up of individuals, and 18.1% had someone living alone who was 65 years of age or older. The average household size was 2.23 and the average family size was 2.98.

The median age in the city was 38.8 years. 25.5% of residents were under the age of 18; 6.5% were between the ages of 18 and 24; 24.8% were from 25 to 44; 20% were from 45 to 64; and 23.2% were 65 years of age or older. The gender makeup of the city was 46.1% male and 53.9% female.

=== 2000 census ===
As of the census of 2000, there were 1,020 people, 434 households, and 255 families living in the city. The population density was 1,083.2 inhabitants per square mile (418.2/km^{2}). There were 459 housing units at an average density of 487.4 per square mile (188.2/km^{2}). The city's racial makeup was 99.02% White, 0.49% African American, 0.29% Native American, 0.10% from other races, and 0.10% from two or more races. Hispanic or Latino of any race were 0.20% of the population.

There were 434 households, of which 27.0% had children under 18 living with them, 45.6% were married couples living together, 11.3% had a female householder with no husband present, and 41.2% were non-families. 37.8% of all households were made up of individuals, and 23.0% had someone living alone who was 65 or older. The average household size was 2.19 and the average family size was 2.85.

In the city, the population was spread out, with 22.7% under the age of 18, 6.4% from 18 to 24, 22.4% from 25 to 44, 19.8% from 45 to 64, and 28.7% who were 65 or older. The median age was 44. For every 100 females, there were 81.5 males. For every 100 females 18 and over, there were 75.1 males.

The ciry's median household income was $29,236 and median family income was $38,462. Men had a median income of $31,161 versus $21,691 for women. The per capita income was $17,087. About 8.2% of families and 10.3% of the population were below the poverty line, including 10.8% of those under 18 and 16.9% of those 65 or older.

== Arts and culture ==
=== Annual cultural events ===
Houston Hoedown Days is the last full weekend in July. The event includes tractor pulls, the Minnesota State Horsepull, dances, and flea markets.

The International Festival of Owls is held each year in Houston, and is the only full-weekend, all-owl event in North America.

== Parks and recreation ==
Houston is the eastern terminus of the Root River segment of the Blufflands State Trail.

== Sports ==
In November 2008 the Houston Hurricanes won the Minnesota 9-Man Football State Championship. They ended their season with a 14–0 record. This was the first state championship in school history, with the exception of five state appearances by the girls' track team, which included a state title in 2006.

Five seniors from the 2008 state championship football team played college football—three at UW-La Crosse and two at Luther College.

== Education ==
Houston Public Schools serves Houston. With the program K12 Inc., Houston Public Schools has developed the Minnesota Center for Online Learning and the Minnesota Virtual Academy. There are no other programs of their kind in Minnesota.

== Infrastructure ==
=== Transportation ===
Minnesota State Highways 16 and 76 are two of the main routes in the city.

== Notable people ==
- Everett Bidwell, Wisconsin legislator, served as a member of the Wisconsin State Assembly and Wisconsin Senate; born in Houston.
- John Q. Briggs, Minnesota legislator and businessman, lived in Houston, MN.
- Francis Martin Kelly, third Bishop of the Roman Catholic Diocese of Winona; born in Houston.
- Jeanne Poppe, Minnesota legislator and former member of the Minnesota House of Representatives; born in Houston.
- John J. Sliter, Minnesota legislator, served as a member of the Minnesota House of Representatives, was a member of the Houston School Board.

== Gallery ==
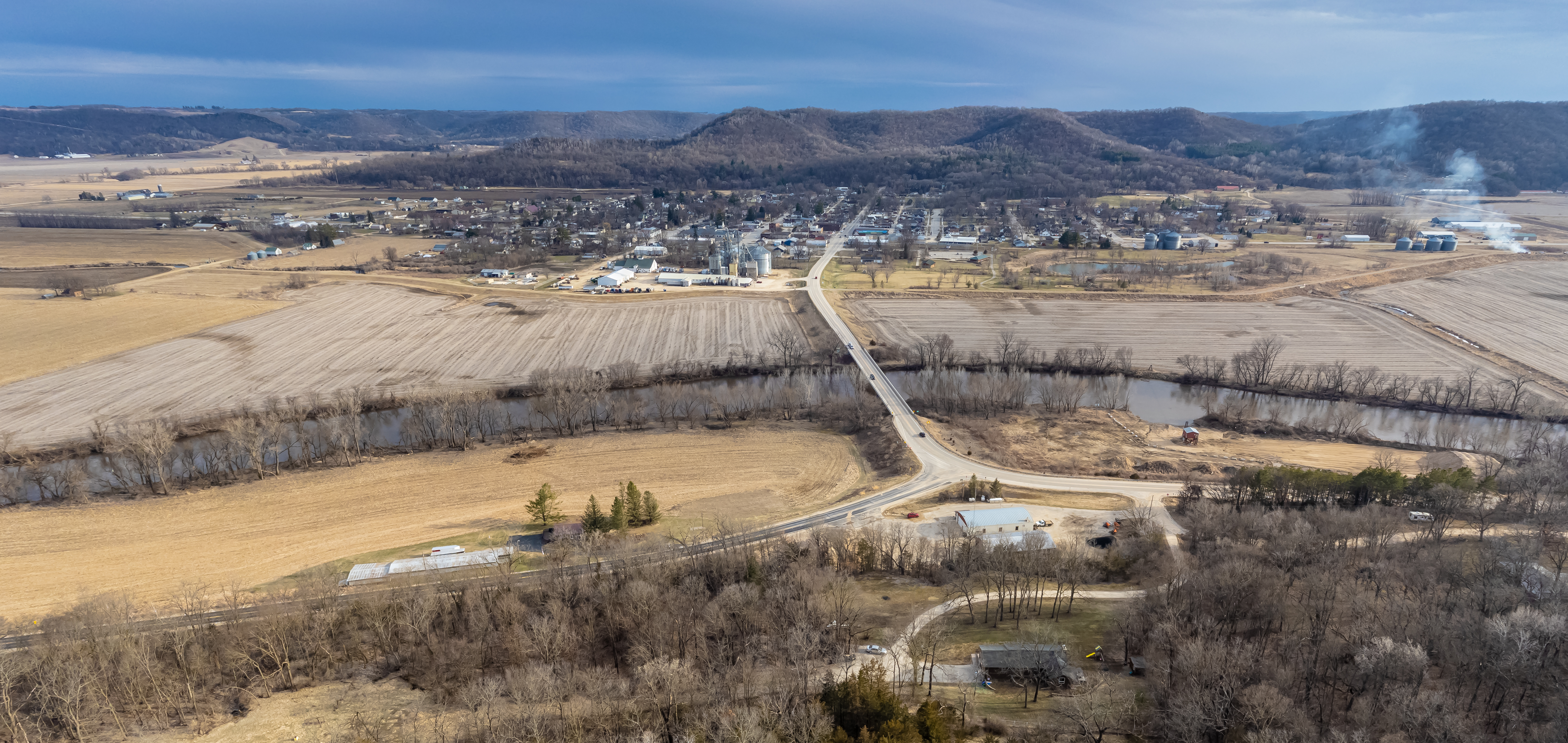
Looking south

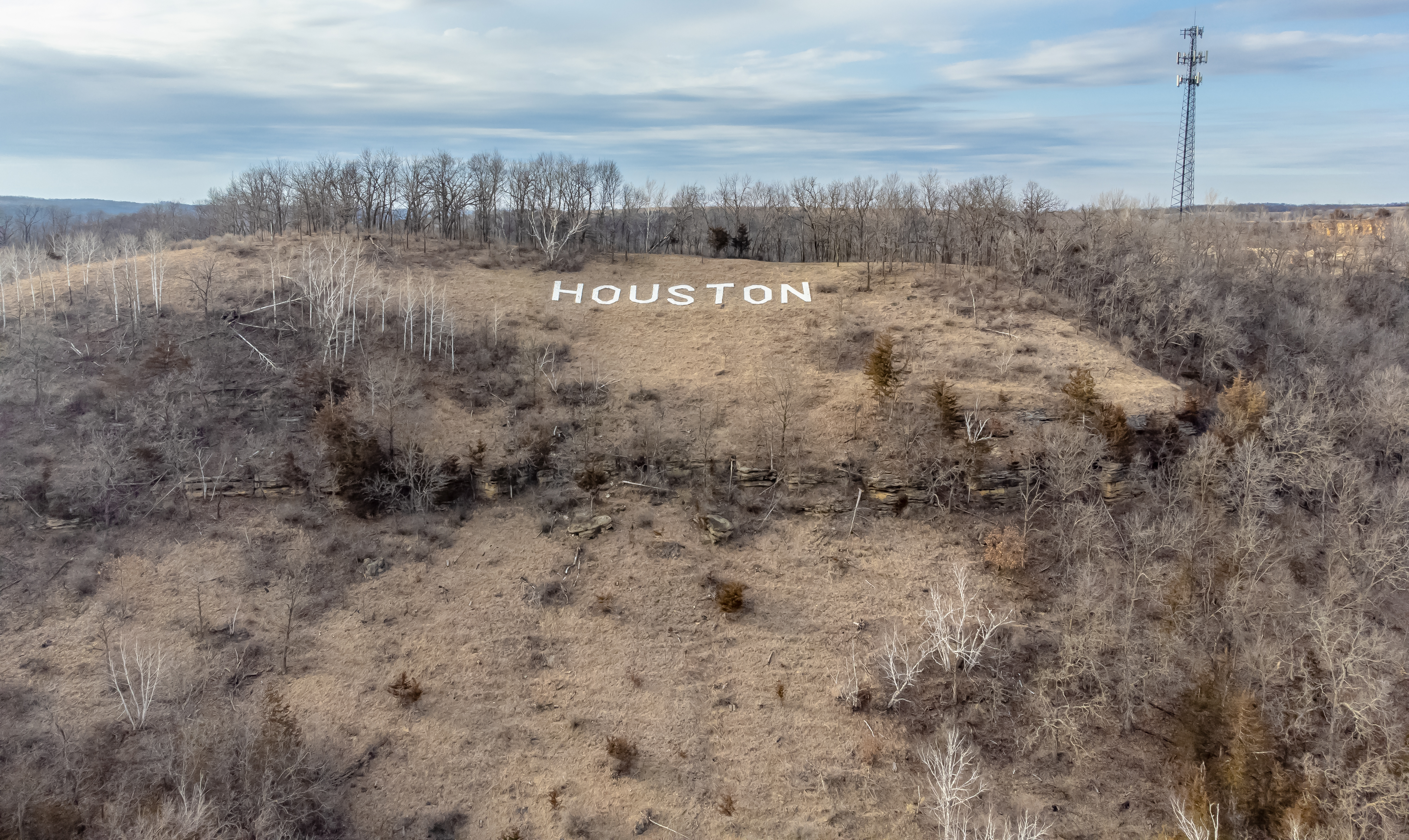
Houston sign

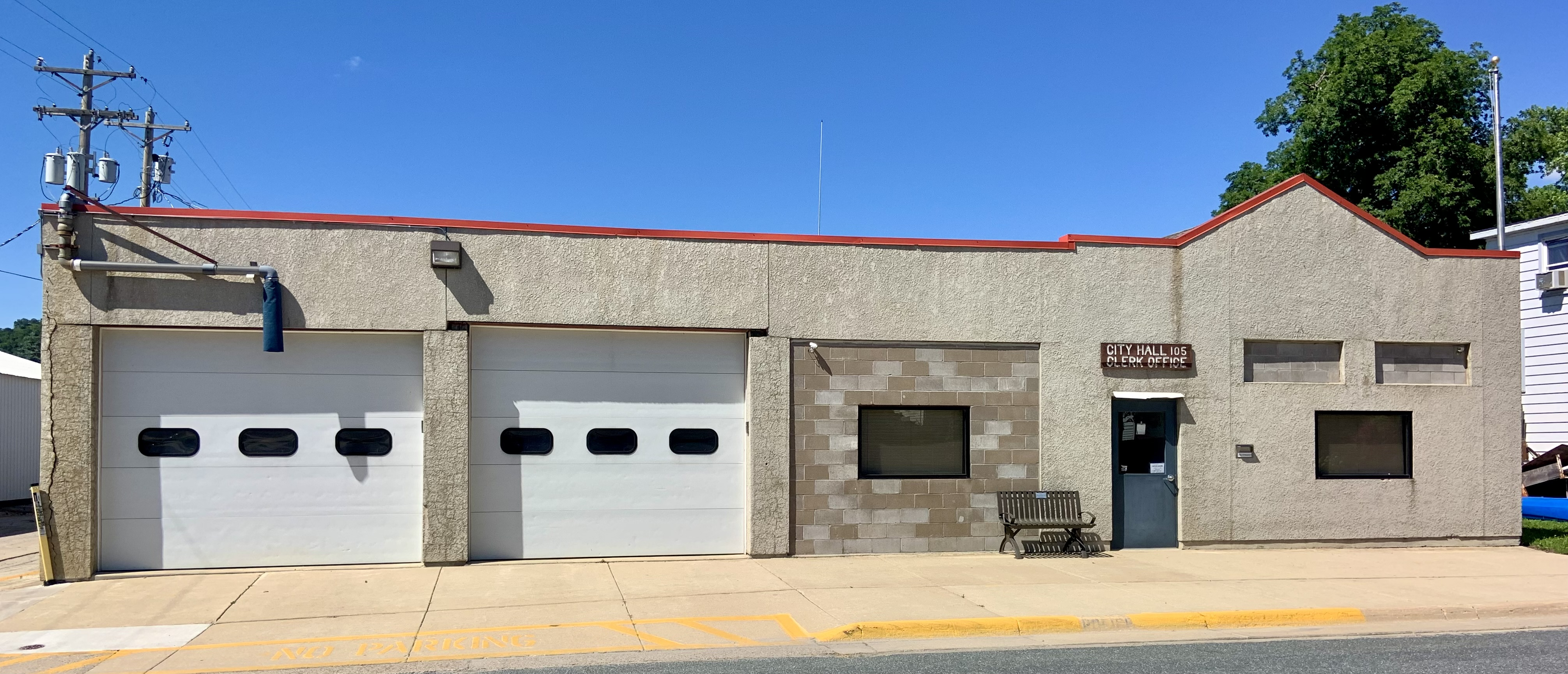
City Hall

== See also ==
- Houston Public Library (Minnesota)
