= John J. Sliter =

American politician

John J. Sliter was a member of the Minnesota House of Representatives.

== Biography ==
Sliter was born on August 26, 1873, in Spring Green, Wisconsin. On October 26, 1897, he married Florence Thompson. They would have four children.

== Career ==
Sliter was elected to the House of Representatives in 1914 and re-elected in 1916 and 1918. Additionally, he was a member of the Houston, Minnesota School Board. He was a Republican.
