= Southeastern Louisiana Lions football, 1930–1939 =

American college football seasons

The Southeastern Louisiana Lions football program, 1930–1939 represented Southeastern Louisiana College (now known as Southeastern Louisiana University) as an independent during the decade of the 1930s. During this time, the Lions were led by three different head coaches and had an overall record for the decade of 54–27–6. During final years of the decade, the Lions played their home games on campus at Strawberry Stadium in Hammond, Louisiana.

The first season of intercollegiate football at Southeastern was led by head coach R. Norval Garrett, and he led the Lions to an overall record of 2–3. A. L. Swanson was next hired as head coach in April 1931. During his seven-year tenure, Swanson led the Lions to an overall record of 42–17–4. Lloyd Stovall coached the Lions for their final two seasons of the decade to an overall record of 10–7–2.

== 1930 ==
1930 Southeastern Louisiana Lions football
- Conference: Independent
- Record: 2–3
- Head coach: R. Norval Garrett (1st season)

1930 Southern college football independents records
	Conf.			Overall
Team	W	L	T	W		L		T
Western Maryland		–		9	–	0	–	1
Texas Mines		–		7	–	1	–	1
Appalachian State		–		8	–	2	–	1
William & Mary Norfolk		–		3	–	1	–	0
Delaware		–		6	–	3	–	1
Furman		–		6	–	3	–	1
Delaware State		–		4	–	2	–	0
Wake Forest		–		5	–	3	–	1
Jacksonville State		–		4	–	3	–	1
Davidson		–		6	–	4	–	0
Navy		–		6	–	5	–	0
George Washington		–		4	–	4	–	1
Georgetown		–		5	–	5	–	0
Middle Tennessee State Teachers		–		5	–	5	–	1
Oglethorpe		–		4	–	4	–	1
Tennessee State		–		3	–	3	–	0
West Virginia		–		5	–	5	–	0
South Georgia Teachers		–		3	–	4	–	2
Mississippi State Teachers		–		3	–	5	–	1
Texas Tech		–		3	–	6	–	0
Troy State		–		1	–	2	–	0
Jefferson (TX)		–		1	–	3	–	0
Beacom College		–		1	–	5	–	1
Catholic University		–		1	–	8	–	0

The 1930 Southeastern Louisiana Lions football team was an American football team that represented Southeastern Louisiana College (now known as Southeastern Louisiana University) as an independent during the 1930 college football season. In their first year under head coach R. Norval Garrett, the team compiled an overall record of 2–3.

Schedule

Date	Opponent	Site	Result	Source
October 3	Amite High School	Amite City, LA	W 7–0	
October 17	at Bogalusa High School	Washington Parish Fairgrounds; Bogalusa, LA	L 6–19	
November 7	at Southwest Mississippi	Summit, MS	L 0–46	
November 11	at Independence High School	Independence, LA	W 13–0	
November 15	at Jesuit High School	Loyola Stadium; New Orleans, LA	L 0–27	

== 1931 ==
1931 Southeastern Louisiana Lions football
- Conference: Independent
- Record: 2–2–2
- Head coach: A. L. Swanson (1st season)

1931 Southern college football independents records
	Conf.			Overall
Team	W	L	T	W		L		T
Catholic University		–		8	–	1	–	0
Texas Mines		–		7	–	1	–	0
Delaware		–		5	–	1	–	2
William & Mary Norfolk		–		1	–	0	–	1
Furman		–		5	–	2	–	2
George Washington		–		5	–	2	–	2
Texas Tech		–		6	–	3	–	0
Troy State		–		6	–	3	–	0
Middle Tennessee State Teachers		–		6	–	4	–	0
Navy		–		5	–	5	–	1
Wake Forest		–		4	–	4	–	0
Western Carolina		–		4	–	4	–	0
Davidson		–		4	–	4	–	2
Western Maryland		–		4	–	4	–	2
Delaware State		–		2	–	2	–	1
Georgetown		–		4	–	5	–	1
Richmond		–		4	–	5	–	0
Tennessee State		–		2	–	3	–	0
West Virginia		–		4	–	6	–	0
Oglethorpe		–		3	–	6	–	0
South Georgia Teachers		–		2	–	6	–	0
Jefferson (TX)		–		1	–	7	–	1
Jacksonville State		–		0	–	7	–	1

The 1931 Southeastern Louisiana Lions football team was an American football team that represented Southeastern Louisiana College (now known as Southeastern Louisiana University) as an independent during the 1931 college football season. In their first year under head coach A. L. Swanson, the team compiled an overall record of 2–2–2.

In April 1931, Swanson was hired to serve as both head football coach and athletic director at Southeastern.

Schedule

Date	Opponent	Site	Result	Source
October 3	at Southwestern Louisiana	Campus Athletic Field; Lafayette, LA (rivalry)	T 6–6	
October 9	at Pearl River	Poplarville, MS	L 0–32	
October 23	Southwest Mississippi	Hammond, LA	W 14–6	
October 30	at Jones County	Ellisville, MS	T 6–6	
November 6	at Ouachita Junior College	Forsythe Park; Monroe, LA	W 6–0	
November 11	Loyola (LA) freshmen	Hammond, LA	L 0–20	

== 1932 ==
1932 Southeastern Louisiana Lions football
- Conference: Independent
- Record: 3–5
- Head coach: A. L. Swanson (2nd season)

1932 Southern college football independents records
	Conf.			Overall
Team	W	L	T	W		L		T
Jefferson (TX)		–		8	–	0	–	0
Catholic University		–		6	–	1	–	1
South Georgia Teachers		–		6	–	2	–	0
Western Maryland		–		5	–	1	–	2
George Washington		–		6	–	2	–	1
Texas Mines		–		7	–	3	–	0
William & Mary Norfolk		–		6	–	3	–	1
Troy State		–		5	–	3	–	2
Delaware		–		5	–	4	–	0
Wake Forest		–		3	–	3	–	2
West Virginia		–		5	–	5	–	0
Georgetown		–		2	–	6	–	1
Navy		–		2	–	6	–	1
Tennessee State		–		1	–	4	–	1
Oglethorpe		–		1	–	6	–	0
East Carolina		–		0	–	5	–	0

The 1932 Southeastern Louisiana Lions football team was an American football team that represented Southeastern Louisiana College (now known as Southeastern Louisiana University) as an independent during the 1932 college football season. In their second year under head coach A. L. Swanson, the team compiled an overall record of 3–5.

Schedule

Date	Opponent	Site	Result	Source
September 16	Southwest Mississippi	Hammond High School Stadium; Hammond, LA	W 12–6	
September 23	at LSU freshmen	Tiger Stadium; Baton Rouge, LA	L 0–6	
September 30	at Southwestern Louisiana	Campus Athletic Field; Lafayette, LA (rivalry)	L 0–6	
October 21	Pearl River	Hammond High School Stadium; Hammond, LA	L 0–14	
October 28	Jones County	Hammond High School Stadium; Hammond, LA	W 75–0	
November 4	Ouachita Junior College	Hammond High School Stadium; Hammond, LA	W 20–0	
November 11	Loyola (LA) freshmen	Hammond High School Stadium; Hammond, LA	L 7–14	
November 26	at Miami (FL)	Moore Park; Miami, FL	L 0–7	

== 1933 ==
1933 Southeastern Louisiana Lions football
- Conference: Independent
- Record: 7–3
- Head coach: A. L. Swanson (3rd season)

1933 Southern college football independents records
	Conf.			Overall
Team	W	L	T	W		L		T
Oklahoma City		–		8	–	1	–	0
Tulsa		–		6	–	1	–	0
Troy State		–		5	–	1	–	0
Tennessee State		–		4	–	1	–	0
Tampa		–		6	–	2	–	2
Texas A&I		–		6	–	2	–	0
Catholic University		–		6	–	3	–	0
South Georgia Teachers		–		5	–	3	–	0
Western Maryland		–		5	–	3	–	0
William & Mary Norfolk		–		5	–	3	–	1
George Washington		–		5	–	3	–	1
Navy		–		5	–	4	–	0
Oglethorpe		–		4	–	5	–	0
Texas Mines		–		3	–	5	–	1
West Virginia		–		3	–	5	–	2
Delaware		–		2	–	4	–	2
Dixie (TX)		–		2	–	4	–	0
Georgetown		–		1	–	6	–	1
Jacksonville State		–		1	–	4	–	1
East Carolina		–		1	–	5	–	0
Wake Forest		–		0	–	5	–	1

The 1933 Southeastern Louisiana Lions football team was an American football team that represented Southeastern Louisiana College (now known as Southeastern Louisiana University) as an independent during the 1933 college football season. In their third year under head coach A. L. Swanson, the team compiled an overall record of 7–3.

Schedule

Date	Opponent	Site	Result	Source
September 15	Southwest Mississippi	Hammond High School Stadium; Hammond, LA	W 6–0	
September 22	at Southwestern Louisiana	Campus Athletic Field; Lafayette, LA (rivalry)	L 0–34	
September 29	at LSU freshmen	Tiger Stadium; Baton Rouge, LA	L 0–19	
October 13	East Mississippi	Southeastern Stadium; Hammond, LA	L 6–12	
October 20	Clarke College (MS)	Southeastern Stadium; Hammond, LA	W 66–0	
October 27	at Jones County	Ellisville, MS	W 18–6	
November 3	Bolivar E. Kemp Reforestation Center	Southeastern Stadium; Hammond, LA	W 68–0	
November 11	Loyola (LA) freshmen	Southeastern Stadium; Hammond, LA	W 13–6	
November 17	East Central (MS)	Southeastern Stadium; Hammond, LA	W 26–12	
November 24	Northwest Mississippi	Southeastern Stadium; Hammond, LA	W 53–12	

== 1934 ==
1934 Southeastern Louisiana Lions football
- Conference: Independent
- Record: 7–3
- Head coach: A. L. Swanson (4th season)

1934 Southern college football independents records
	Conf.			Overall
Team	W	L	T	W		L		T
Western Maryland		–		8	–	0	–	1
No. 7 Navy		–		8	–	1	–	0
Tennessee State		–		6	–	1	–	1
Texas A&I		–		5	–	1	–	1
Troy State		–		7	–	2	–	0
Tulsa		–		5	–	2	–	1
George Washington		–		6	–	3	–	1
Tampa		–		8	–	4	–	0
West Virginia		–		6	–	4	–	0
Oglethorpe		–		5	–	4	–	1
Delaware		–		4	–	3	–	1
Georgetown		–		4	–	3	–	1
Texas Mines		–		4	–	4	–	0
Catholic University		–		3	–	4	–	1
Jacksonville State		–		3	–	4	–	0
South Georgia Teachers		–		4	–	5	–	0
William & Mary Norfolk		–		2	–	4	–	2
Wake Forest		–		3	–	7	–	0
East Carolina		–		1	–	4	–	1
Oklahoma City		–		1	–	8	–	0
Dixie (TX)		–		0	–	7	–	0
Rankings from Associated Press

The 1934 Southeastern Louisiana Lions football team was an American football team that represented Southeastern Louisiana College (now known as Southeastern Louisiana University) as an independent during the 1934 college football season. In their fourth year under head coach A. L. Swanson, the team compiled an overall record of 7–3.

Schedule

Date	Opponent	Site	Result	Attendance	Source
September 21	Southwest Mississippi	Southeastern Stadium; Hammond, LA	W 13–0	1,400	
September 28	LSU freshmen	Southeastern Stadium; Hammond, LA	W 11–0	2,100	
October 5	Mississippi State Teachers freshmen	Southeastern Stadium; Hammond, LA	W 33–16		
October 12	at Miami (FL)	Moore Park; Miami, FL	L 7–26		
October 19	at Northeast Center	Brown Field; Monroe, LA	L 6–19		
October 26	at Southwestern Louisiana	Campus Athletic Field; Lafayette, LA (rivalry)	L 0–10		
November 2	East Mississippi	Southeastern Stadium; Hammond, LA	W 39–0		
November 9	Loyola (LA) freshmen^{†}	Southeastern Stadium; Hammond, LA	W 39–0		
November 16	at East Central (MS)	Decatur, MS	W 27–0		
November 28	vs. Pearl River	Redwood Bowl; Bogalusa, LA	W 8–6		
^{†}Homecoming

== 1935 ==
1935 Southeastern Louisiana Lions football
- Conference: Independent
- Record: 7–2
- Head coach: A. L. Swanson (5th season)
- Home stadium: Southeastern Athletic Field

1935 Southern college football independents records
	Conf.			Overall
Team	W	L	T	W		L		T
Catholic University		–		8	–	1	–	0
William & Mary Norfolk		–		8	–	1	–	0
Texas Wesleyan		–		8	–	2	–	1
George Washington		–		6	–	3	–	0
Hardin–Simmons		–		6	–	3	–	1
Tennessee State		–		4	–	3	–	1
Navy		–		5	–	4	–	0
Western Maryland		–		6	–	5	–	0
East Carolina		–		3	–	3	–	0
Georgetown		–		4	–	4	–	0
Tampa		–		5	–	5	–	0
Troy State		–		5	–	5	–	0
South Georgia Teachers		–		3	–	3	–	2
West Virginia		–		3	–	4	–	2
Oklahoma City		–		3	–	4	–	1
Texas A&I		–		3	–	5	–	0
Delaware		–		2	–	5	–	1
Jacksonville State		–		2	–	5	–	0
Wake Forest		–		2	–	7	–	0
Oglethorpe		–		1	–	8	–	0

The 1935 Southeastern Louisiana Lions football team was an American football team that represented Southeastern Louisiana College (now known as Southeastern Louisiana University) as an independent during the 1935 college football season. In their fifth year under head coach A. L. Swanson, the team compiled an overall record of 7–2.

Schedule

Date	Opponent	Site	Result	Source
September 20	Louisiana Normal	Southeastern Athletic Field; Hammond, LA (rivalry)	W 19–13	
September 26	LSU freshmen	Southeastern Athletic Field; Hammond, LA	W 6–0	
October 4	at Southwestern Louisiana	Campus Athletic Field; Lafayette, LA (rivalry)	W 13–7	
October 11	at Miami (FL)	Miami Stadium; Miami, FL	L 0–2	
October 18	Southwest Mississippi	Southeastern Athletic Field; Hammond, LA	W 19–7	
October 25	at Rollins	Tinker Field; Orlando, FL	W 19–0	
November 8	Loyola (LA) freshmen	Southeastern Athletic Field; Hammond, LA	W 14–0	
November 15	Northeast Center	Southeastern Athletic Field; Hammond, LA	L 6–16	
November 22	Pearl River	Southeastern Athletic Field; Hammond, LA	W 14–12	

== 1936 ==
1936 Southeastern Louisiana Lions football
- Conference: Independent
- Record: 8–0–1
- Head coach: A. L. Swanson (6th season)
- Home stadium: Southeastern Athletic Field

1936 Southern college football independents records
	Conf.			Overall
Team	W	L	T	W		L		T
George Washington		–		7	–	1	–	1
Hardin–Simmons		–		9	–	2	–	0
Georgetown		–		6	–	2	–	1
Roanoke		–		6	–	2	–	1
Western Maryland		–		7	–	3	–	1
No. 18 Navy		–		6	–	3	–	0
Tampa		–		5	–	3	–	2
West Virginia		–		6	–	4	–	0
East Carolina		–		3	–	2	–	0
Catholic University		–		4	–	4	–	0
Jacksonville State		–		2	–	2	–	1
Oklahoma City		–		4	–	4	–	0
William & Mary Norfolk		–		4	–	4	–	0
Tennessee State		–		3	–	3	–	2
Oglethorpe		–		4	–	5	–	0
Texas Wesleyan		–		3	–	6	–	1
Troy State		–		3	–	6	–	0
Delaware		–		2	–	6	–	0
South Georgia Teachers		–		2	–	8	–	0
Rankings from AP Poll

The 1936 Southeastern Louisiana Lions football team was an American football team that represented Southeastern Louisiana College (now known as Southeastern Louisiana University) as an independent during the 1936 college football season. In their sixth year under head coach A. L. Swanson, the team compiled an overall record of 8–0–1. Southeastern Louisiana played home games on campus at Southeastern Athletic Field in Hammond, Louisiana.

Schedule

Date	Opponent	Site	Result	Attendance	Source
September 18	LSU freshmen	Southeastern Athletic Field; Hammond, LA	W 6–0		
September 25	at Louisiana Normal	Normal Field; Natchitoches, LA (rivalry)	W 34–6		
October 1	at Northeast Center	Brown Field; Monroe, LA	W 22–0	6,000	
October 9	at Pearl River	Poplarville, MS	T 0–0		
October 16	Southwest Mississippi	Southeastern Athletic Field; Hammond, LA	W 7–0		
October 30	Loyola (LA) freshmen	Southeastern Athletic Field; Hammond, LA	W 15–0		
November 6	at Southwestern Louisiana	Campus Athletic Field; Lafayette, LA (rivalry)	W 19–0		
November 20	at Jones County	Ellisville, MS	W 41–12		
November 26	East Mississippi	Southeastern Athletic Field; Hammond, LA	W 45–0		

== 1937 ==
1937 Southeastern Louisiana Lions football
- Conference: Independent
- Record: 8–2–1
- Head coach: A. L. Swanson (7th season)
- Home stadium: Strawberry Stadium

1937 Southern college football independents records
	Conf.			Overall
Team	W	L	T	W		L		T
Delaware State		–		1	–	0	–	0
Hardin–Simmons		–		8	–	0	–	1
West Virginia		–		8	–	1	–	1
Catholic University		–		5	–	3	–	0
William & Mary Norfolk		–		5	–	3	–	0
Roanoke		–		6	–	4	–	0
Navy		–		4	–	4	–	1
Tampa		–		4	–	5	–	0
George Washington		–		3	–	4	–	1
Georgetown		–		2	–	4	–	2
Western Maryland		–		3	–	6	–	0
East Carolina		–		2	–	5	–	0
Loyola (LA)		–		2	–	6	–	1
Virginia		–		2	–	7	–	0
South Georgia Teachers		–		2	–	9	–	0
Delaware		–		1	–	7	–	0
Oklahoma City		–		1	–	9	–	0
Jacksonville State		–		0	–	5	–	0

The 1937 Southeastern Louisiana Lions football team was an American football team that represented Southeastern Louisiana College (now known as Southeastern Louisiana University) as an independent during the 1937 college football season. In their seventh year under head coach A. L. Swanson, the team compiled an overall record of 8–2–1. Southeastern Louisiana played their home games on campus at Strawberry Stadium in Hammond, Louisiana.

Schedule

Date	Opponent	Site	Result	Attendance	Source
September 17	LSU freshmen	Strawberry Stadium; Hammond, LA	L 7–13	7,000	
September 24	Southwest Mississippi	Strawberry Stadium; Hammond, LA	W 52–7		
October 1	Tulane freshmen	Strawberry Stadium; Hammond, LA	W 19–0		
October 8	Lamar	Strawberry Stadium; Hammond, LA	W 20–12		
October 15	at Rollins	Tinker Field; Orlando, FL	W 7–0		
October 22	Loyola (LA) freshmen	Strawberry Stadium; Hammond, LA	W 6–0		
October 29	at Delta State	Delta Field; Cleveland, MS	L 10–13		
November 5	Northeast Center	Strawberry Stadium; Hammond, LA	T 0–0		
November 11	Pearl River	Strawberry Stadium; Hammond, LA	W 27–0		
November 19	Jones County	Strawberry Stadium; Hammond, LA	W 31–6		
November 20	at Pensacola Navy	Legion Field; Pensacola, FL	W 20–14		

== 1938 ==
1938 Southeastern Louisiana Lions football
- Conference: Independent
- Record: 4–4–2
- Head coach: Lloyd Stovall (1st season)
- Home stadium: Strawberry Stadium

1938 Southern college football independents records
	Conf.			Overall
Team	W	L	T	W		L		T
Georgetown		–		8	–	0	–	0
Hardin–Simmons		–		8	–	2	–	0
Roanoke		–		5	–	2	–	3
Western Maryland		–		5	–	2	–	1
Catholic University		–		5	–	3	–	0
George Washington		–		5	–	4	–	0
Navy		–		4	–	3	–	2
Virginia		–		4	–	4	–	1
West Virginia		–		4	–	5	–	1
Loyola (LA)		–		4	–	5	–	0
South Georgia Teachers		–		3	–	5	–	1
William & Mary Norfolk		–		3	–	5	–	1
Delaware		–		3	–	5	–	0
Delaware State		–		1	–	2	–	0
Oklahoma City		–		2	–	8	–	0
East Carolina		–		1	–	6	–	1

The 1938 Southeastern Louisiana Lions football team was an American football team that represented Southeastern Louisiana College (now known as Southeastern Louisiana University) as an independent during the 1938 college football season. In their first year under head coach Lloyd Stovall, the team compiled an overall record of 4–4–2. Southeastern Louisiana played their home games on campus at Strawberry Stadium in Hammond, Louisiana.

In January 1938, Stovall was hired to serve as both head football coach and athletic director at Southeastern after the resignation of A. L. Swanson.

Schedule

Date	Opponent	Site	Result	Attendance	Source
September 16	Southwestern Louisiana	Strawberry Stadium; Hammond, LA (rivalry)	L 0–8	2,000	
September 23	LSU freshmen	Strawberry Stadium; Hammond, LA	L 0–19		
September 30	Tulane freshmen	Strawberry Stadium; Hammond, LA	L 0–19		
October 7	at Louisiana Normal	Demon Field; Natchitoches, LA (rivalry)	L 0–6		
October 21	Loyola (LA) freshmen	Strawberry Stadium; Hammond, LA	W 44–0		
October 28	Lamar	Strawberry Stadium; Hammond, LA	W 20–7		
November 4	at Northeast Center	Brown Field; Monroe, LA	T 0–0		
November 11	Southwest Mississippi	Strawberry Stadium; Hammond, LA	W 65–0		
November 23	Arkansas A&M	Strawberry Stadium; Hammond, LA	W 48–14		
December 3	Louisiana Tech	Tech Stadium; Ruston, LA	T 0–0	3,000	

== 1939 ==
1939 Southeastern Louisiana Lions football
- Conference: Independent
- Record: 6–3
- Head coach: Lloyd Stovall (2nd season)
- Home stadium: Strawberry Stadium

1939 Southern college football independents records
	Conf.			Overall
Team	W	L	T	W		L		T
Georgetown		–		7	–	0	–	1
Catholic University		–		8	–	1	–	1
Hardin–Simmons		–		7	–	1	–	1
George Washington		–		5	–	3	–	0
Virginia		–		5	–	4	–	0
Georgia Teachers		–		5	–	5	–	0
Oklahoma City		–		4	–	4	–	2
Roanoke		–		4	–	4	–	0
Delaware State		–		2	–	2	–	0
William & Mary Norfolk		–		4	–	5	–	0
Navy		–		3	–	5	–	1
West Virginia		–		2	–	6	–	1
Western Maryland		–		1	–	6	–	0
Delaware		–		1	–	7	–	0
East Carolina		–		0	–	8	–	0

The 1939 Southeastern Louisiana Lions football team was an American football team that represented Southeastern Louisiana College (now known as Southeastern Louisiana University) as an independent during the 1939 college football season. In their second year under head coach Lloyd Stovall, the team compiled an overall record of 6–3. Southeastern Louisiana played their home games on campus at Strawberry Stadium in Hammond, Louisiana.

The October 13 game at Jones County was a 12–6 win by the Lions' freshmen team.

Schedule

Date	Opponent	Site	Result	Source
September 29	Southwest Mississippi	Strawberry Stadium; Hammond, LA	W 31–6	
October 6	Louisiana Normal	Strawberry Stadium; Hammond, LA (rivalry)	L 6–18	
October 20	Perkinston	Strawberry Stadium; Hammond, LA	W 12–0	
October 27	Loyola (LA) freshmen	Strawberry Stadium; Hammond, LA	W 25–0	
November 3	at Spring Hill	Dorn Stadium; Mobile, AL	W 6–0	
November 10	at Murray State (OK)	Tishomingo, OK	L 12–14	
November 17	Northeast Center	Strawberry Stadium; Hammond, LA	L 0–2	
November 25	at Pensacola Navy	Air Station Field; Pensacola, FL	W 18–7	
November 29	Livingston State	Strawberry Stadium; Hammond, LA	W 47–6	
