= 1930 Tennessee State Tigers football team =

American college football season

1930 Tennessee State Tigers football
- Conference: Independent
- Record: 3–3
- Head coach: T. D. Upshaw (1st season)
- Captain: Samuel Jones
- Home stadium: State College field

1930 Southern college football independents records
	Conf.			Overall
Team	W	L	T	W		L		T
Western Maryland		–		9	–	0	–	1
Texas Mines		–		7	–	1	–	1
Appalachian State		–		8	–	2	–	1
William & Mary Norfolk		–		3	–	1	–	0
Delaware		–		6	–	3	–	1
Furman		–		6	–	3	–	1
Delaware State		–		4	–	2	–	0
Wake Forest		–		5	–	3	–	1
Jacksonville State		–		4	–	3	–	1
Davidson		–		6	–	4	–	0
Navy		–		6	–	5	–	0
George Washington		–		4	–	4	–	1
Georgetown		–		5	–	5	–	0
Middle Tennessee State Teachers		–		5	–	5	–	1
Oglethorpe		–		4	–	4	–	1
Tennessee State		–		3	–	3	–	0
West Virginia		–		5	–	5	–	0
South Georgia Teachers		–		3	–	4	–	2
Mississippi State Teachers		–		3	–	5	–	1
Texas Tech		–		3	–	6	–	0
Troy State		–		1	–	2	–	0
Jefferson (TX)		–		1	–	3	–	0
Beacom College		–		1	–	5	–	1
Catholic University		–		1	–	8	–	0

The 1930 Tennessee State Tigers football team represented Tennessee Agricultural & Industrial State College—now known as Tennessee State University—as an independent during the 1930 college football season. Led by first-year head coach T. D. Upshaw, the Tigers compiled a record of 3–3. Upshaw was assisted by Fletcher "Nick" Turner. Samuel Jones was the team captain.

== Schedule ==
Date	Time	Opponent	Site	Result	Source
October 11	2:00 p.m.	vs. Morristown	Lincoln Park; Chattanooga, TN	W 13–0	
October 18		at Kentucky State	Frankfort, KY	L 0–6	
October 25		West Kentucky Industrial	Nashville, TN	L 6–19	
November 8		Alabama A&M	State College field; Nashville, TN	W 12–0	
November 22		vs. Mississippi Industrial	Lewis Park; Memphis, TN	W 45–0	
November 27		Fisk^{†}	State College field; Nashville, TN	L 0–13 or 0–20	
^{†}Homecoming; All times are in Central time
