= 1932 Tennessee State Tigers football team =

American college football season

1932 Tennessee State Tigers football
- Conference: Independent
- Record: 1–4–1
- Head coach: Ed Benjamin (1st season)

1932 Southern college football independents records
	Conf.			Overall
Team	W	L	T	W		L		T
Jefferson (TX)		–		8	–	0	–	0
Catholic University		–		6	–	1	–	1
South Georgia Teachers		–		6	–	2	–	0
Western Maryland		–		5	–	1	–	2
George Washington		–		6	–	2	–	1
Texas Mines		–		7	–	3	–	0
William & Mary Norfolk		–		6	–	3	–	1
Troy State		–		5	–	3	–	2
Delaware		–		5	–	4	–	0
Wake Forest		–		3	–	3	–	2
West Virginia		–		5	–	5	–	0
Georgetown		–		2	–	6	–	1
Navy		–		2	–	6	–	1
Tennessee State		–		1	–	4	–	1
Oglethorpe		–		1	–	6	–	0
East Carolina		–		0	–	5	–	0

The 1932 Tennessee State Tigers football team represented Tennessee Agricultural & Industrial State College—now known as Tennessee State University—as an independent during the 1932 college football season. Led by Ed Benjamin in first and only season as head coach, the Tigers compiled a record of 1–4–1.

== Schedule ==
Date	Time	Opponent	Site	Result	Attendance	Source
October 22		Morristown	Nashville, TN	L 0–6		
October 29		LeMoyne	Nashville, TN	L 7–14	1,000	
November 5	2:30 p.m.	at West Kentucky Industrial	Hook Park; Paducah, KY	L 0–48		
November 11		Lane		T 0–0		
November 24		Alabama A&M^{†}	Nashville, TN	W 26–6		
November 26		at Louisville Municipal	Central High School stadium; Louisville, KY	L 0–12		
^{†}Homecoming; All times are in Central time
