= 1932 Jacksonville State Eagle Owls football team =

American college football season

1932 Jacksonville State Eagle Owls football
- Conference: Independent
- Record: 3–1–1
- Head coach: T. B. Shotts (2nd season)
- Home stadium: Fair Park

1932 Southern college football independents records
	Conf.			Overall
Team	W	L	T	W		L		T
Jefferson (TX)		–		8	–	0	–	0
Catholic University		–		6	–	1	–	1
South Georgia Teachers		–		6	–	2	–	0
Western Maryland		–		5	–	1	–	2
George Washington		–		6	–	2	–	1
Texas Mines		–		7	–	3	–	0
William & Mary Norfolk		–		6	–	3	–	1
Troy State		–		5	–	3	–	2
Delaware		–		5	–	4	–	0
Wake Forest		–		3	–	3	–	2
West Virginia		–		5	–	5	–	0
Georgetown		–		2	–	6	–	1
Navy		–		2	–	6	–	1
Oglethorpe		–		1	–	6	–	0
East Carolina		–		0	–	5	–	0

The 1932 Jacksonville State Eagle Owls football team represented Jacksonville State Teachers College (now known as Jacksonville State University) as an independent during the 1932 college football season. Led by second-year head coach T. B. Shotts, the Eagle Owls compiled an overall record of 3–1–1.

== Schedule ==
Date	Opponent	Site	Result	Source
October 15	at Cumberland (TN)	Lebanon, TN	W 6–0	
October 21	Rollins	Fair Park; Anniston, AL	T 7–7	
October 29	Marion	Fair Park; Anniston, AL	W 24–0	
November 5	at Piedmont	Demorest, GA	W 7–6	
November 11	at Troy State	Pace Field; Troy, AL (rivalry)	L 0–20	
