= 1932 Davidson Wildcats football team =

American college football season

1932 Davidson Wildcats football
- Conference: Independent
- Record: 4–4–1
- Head coach: Williams Newton (1st season)
- Home stadium: Richardson Field

1932 Southern college football independents records
| | Conf. | | | Overall |
| Team | W | L | T | W | | L | | T |
|---|---|---|---|---|---|---|---|---|
| Jefferson (TX) | | – | | 8 | – | 0 | – | 0 |
| Catholic University | | – | | 6 | – | 1 | – | 1 |
| South Georgia Teachers | | – | | 6 | – | 2 | – | 0 |
| Western Maryland | | – | | 5 | – | 1 | – | 2 |
| George Washington | | – | | 6 | – | 2 | – | 1 |
| Texas Mines | | – | | 7 | – | 3 | – | 0 |
| William & Mary Norfolk | | – | | 6 | – | 3 | – | 1 |
| Troy State | | – | | 5 | – | 3 | – | 2 |
| Delaware | | – | | 5 | – | 4 | – | 0 |
| Wake Forest | | – | | 3 | – | 3 | – | 2 |
| West Virginia | | – | | 5 | – | 5 | – | 0 |
| Georgetown | | – | | 2 | – | 6 | – | 1 |
| Navy | | – | | 2 | – | 6 | – | 1 |
| Oglethorpe | | – | | 1 | – | 6 | – | 0 |
| East Carolina | | – | | 0 | – | 5 | – | 0 |

The 1932 Davidson Wildcats football team was an American football team that represented Davidson College as an independent during the 1932 college football season. In their first year under head coach Williams Newton, the team compiled a 4–4–1 record.

== Schedule ==
| Date | Opponent | Site | Result | Attendance | Source |
|---|---|---|---|---|---|
| September 24 | at Duke | Duke Stadium; Durham, NC | L 0–13 | | |
| October 1 | Washington and Lee | Richardson Field; Davidson, NC | W 7–0 | | |
| October 7 | Wofford | Richardson Field; Davidson, NC | W 40–6 | | |
| October 15 | at VMI | Alumni Field; Lexington, VA | W 12–0 | | |
| October 22 | at The Citadel | Johnson Hagood Stadium; Charleston, SC | L 6–7 | | |
| October 29 | Clemson | Richardson Field; Davidson, NC | T 7–7 | | |
| November 5 | vs. NC State | Central High School Stadium; Charlotte, NC | L 3–7 | | |
| November 12 | North Carolina | Richardson Field; Davidson, NC | L 0–12 | 12,000 | |
| November 24 | Wake Forest | Richardson Field; Davidson, NC | W 7–0 | | |
