= List of Southeastern Louisiana Lions football seasons =

This is a list of seasons completed by the Southeastern Louisiana Lions football team of the National Collegiate Athletic Association (NCAA) Division I Football Championship Subdivision (FCS). Southeastern Louisiana's first football team was fielded in 1930.

Southeastern Louisiana originally competed as a football independent, before going on to compete in the Louisiana Intercollegiate Conference, Gulf States Conference, Gulf South Conference, and Gulf Star Conference. Following the 1985 season, Southeastern Louisiana's football team was discontinued for seventeen seasons, before being reinstated as a Division I-AA team in 2003. Southeastern Louisiana competed as a Division I-AA Independent team for two seasons before joining the I-AA's Southland Conference in 2005, of which it has been a member since.

== Seasons ==
Statistics correct as of the end of the 2024 college football season

NCAA Division I champions	NCAA Division I FCS champions	Conference champions	Division champions	Bowl Eligible	Undefeated Season

Year	NCAA Division	Conference	Conference Division	Overall					Conference						Coach	Final Ranking
Year	NCAA Division	Conference	Conference Division	Games	Win	Loss	Tie	Pct.	Games	Win	Loss	Tie	Pct.	Standing	Coach	Final Ranking
1930	N/A	Independent	N/A	5	2	3	0	.400	0	0	0	0	.000	N/A	R. Norval Garrett	-
1931	N/A	Independent	N/A	6	2	2	2	.500	0	0	0	0	.000	N/A	A. L. Swanson	-
1932	N/A	Independent	N/A	8	3	5	0	.375	0	0	0	0	.000	N/A	A. L. Swanson	-
1933	N/A	Independent	N/A	10	7	3	0	.700	0	0	0	0	.000	N/A	A. L. Swanson	-
1934	N/A	Independent	N/A	10	7	3	0	.700	0	0	0	0	.000	N/A	A. L. Swanson	-
1935	N/A	Independent	N/A	9	7	2	0	.778	0	0	0	0	.000	N/A	A. L. Swanson	-
1936	N/A	Independent	N/A	8	7	0	1	.938	0	0	0	0	.000	N/A	A. L. Swanson	-
1937	N/A	Independent	N/A	11	8	2	1	.773	0	0	0	0	.000	N/A	A. L. Swanson	-
1938	N/A	Independent	N/A	10	4	4	2	.500	0	0	0	0	.000	N/A	Lloyd Stovall	-
1939	N/A	Independent	N/A	9	6	3	0	.667	0	0	0	0	.000	N/A	Lloyd Stovall	-
1940	N/A	Independent	N/A	10	3	6	1	.350	0	0	0	0	.000	N/A	Lloyd Stovall	-
1941	N/A	Independent	N/A	9	4	5	0	.444	0	0	0	0	.000	N/A	Jesse Fatheree	-
1942	N/A	Independent	N/A	10	5	5	0	.500	0	0	0	0	.000	N/A	Arthur Morton	-
1943	No team Due To World War II															
1944	No team Due To World War II															
1945	No team Due To World War II															
1946	N/A	Louisiana Intercollegiate Conference	N/A	9	9	0	0	1.000	0	0	0	0	.000	N/A	Ned McGehee	-
1947	N/A	Louisiana Intercollegiate Conference	N/A	9	3	5	1	.389	0	0	0	0	.000	N/A	Ned McGehee	-
1948	N/A	Gulf States	N/A	10	3	6	1	.350	0	0	0	0	.000	N/A	Ned McGehee	-
1949	N/A	Gulf States	N/A	10	4	5	1	.450	0	0	0	0	.000	N/A	Ned McGehee	-
1950	N/A	Gulf States	N/A	10	6	4	0	.600	0	0	0	0	.000	N/A	Ned McGehee	-
1951	N/A	Gulf States	N/A	9	6	3	0	.667	0	0	0	0	.000	N/A	Stan Galloway	-
1952	N/A	Gulf States	N/A	9	6	2	1	.722	0	0	0	0	.000	N/A	Stan Galloway	-
1953	N/A	Gulf States	N/A	9	6	3	0	.667	0	0	0	0	.000	N/A	Stan Galloway	-
1954	N/A	Gulf States	N/A	9	9	0	0	1.000	0	0	0	0	.000	N/A	Stan Galloway	-
1955	N/A	Gulf States	N/A	10	5	5	0	.500	0	0	0	0	.000	N/A	Stan Galloway	-
1956	N/A	Gulf States	N/A	10	6	4	0	.600	0	0	0	0	.000	N/A	Stan Galloway	-
1957	N/A	Gulf States	N/A	9	2	6	1	.278	0	0	0	0	.000	N/A	Stan Galloway	-
1958	N/A	Gulf States	N/A	9	4	5	0	.444	0	0	0	0	.000	N/A	Stan Galloway	-
1959	N/A	Gulf States	N/A	9	5	4	0	.556	0	0	0	0	.000	N/A	Stan Galloway	-
1960	N/A	Gulf States	N/A	10	9	1	0	.900	0	0	0	0	.000	N/A	Stan Galloway	-
1961	N/A	Gulf States	N/A	10	9	1	0	.900	0	0	0	0	.000	N/A	Stan Galloway	-
1962	N/A	Gulf States	N/A	9	6	3	0	.667	0	0	0	0	.000	N/A	Stan Galloway	-
1963	N/A	Gulf States	N/A	9	4	4	1	.500	0	0	0	0	.000	N/A	Stan Galloway	-
1964	N/A	Gulf States	N/A	9	6	3	0	.667	0	0	0	0	.000	N/A	Stan Galloway	-
1965	N/A	Gulf States	N/A	9	5	4	0	.556	0	0	0	0	.000	N/A	Pat Kenelly	-
1966	N/A	Gulf States	N/A	9	3	6	0	.333	0	0	0	0	.000	N/A	Pat Kenelly	-
1967	N/A	Gulf States	N/A	9	4	5	0	.444	0	0	0	0	.000	N/A	Pat Kenelly	-
1968	N/A	Gulf States	N/A	10	4	6	0	.400	0	0	0	0	.000	N/A	Pat Kenelly	-
1969	N/A	Gulf States	N/A	10	5	5	0	.500	0	0	0	0	.000	N/A	Pat Kenelly	-
1970	N/A	Gulf States	N/A	10	3	7	0	.300	0	0	0	0	.000	N/A	Pat Kenelly	-
1971	II	Mid-South	N/A	11	0	11	0	.000	0	0	0	0	.000	N/A	Pat Kenelly	-
1972	II	Gulf South	N/A	11	3	8	0	.273	0	0	0	0	.000	N/A	Roland Dale	-
1973	II	Gulf South	N/A	10	4	6	0	.400	0	0	0	0	.000	N/A	Roland Dale	-
1974	II	Gulf South	N/A	10	6	4	0	.600	0	0	0	0	.000	N/A	Billy Brewer	-
1975	II	Gulf South	N/A	11	4	7	0	.364	0	0	0	0	.000	N/A	Billy Brewer	-
1976	II	Gulf South	N/A	11	9	1	1	.864	0	0	0	0	.000	N/A	Billy Brewer	-
1977	II	Gulf South	N/A	10	6	4	0	.600	0	0	0	0	.000	N/A	Billy Brewer	-
1978	II	Gulf South	N/A	11	7	3	1	.682	0	0	0	0	.000	N/A	Billy Brewer	-
1979	II	Division II Independent	N/A	11	6	5	0	.545	0	0	0	0	.000	N/A	Billy Brewer	-
1980	I-AA	Division I-AA Independent	N/A	10	8	2	0	.800	0	0	0	0	.000	N/A	Oscar Lofton	-
1981	I-AA	Division I-AA Independent	N/A	11	8	3	0	.727	0	0	0	0	.000	N/A	Oscar Lofton	-
1982	I-AA	Division I-AA Independent	N/A	11	4	7	0	.364	0	0	0	0	.000	N/A	Oscar Lofton	-
1983	I-AA	Division I-AA Independent	N/A	11	6	5	0	.545	0	0	0	0	.000	N/A	Oscar Lofton	-
1984	I-AA	Gulf Star	N/A	11	2	8	1	.227	0	0	0	0	.000	N/A	Oscar Lofton	-
1985	I-AA	Gulf Star	N/A	11	2	9	0	.182	0	0	0	0	.000	N/A	Oscar Lofton	-
1986	No team															
1987	No team															
1988	No team															
1989	No team															
1990	No team															
1991	No team															
1992	No team															
1993	No team															
1994	No team															
1995	No team															
1996	No team															
1997	No team															
1998	No team															
1999	No team															
2000	No team															
2001	No team															
2002	No team															
2003	I-AA	Division I-AA Independent	N/A	12	5	7	0	.417	0	0	0	0	.000	N/A	Hal Mumme	-
2004	I-AA	Division I-AA Independent	N/A	11	7	4	0	.636	0	0	0	0	.000	N/A	Hal Mumme	-
2005	I-AA	Southland	N/A	10	4	6	0	.400	6	2	4	0	.333	N/A	Dennis Roland	-
2006	FCS	Southland	N/A	11	2	9	0	.182	6	1	5	0	.167	N/A	Dennis Roland	-
2007	FCS	Southland	N/A	11	3	8	0	.273	7	2	5	0	.286	N/A	Mike Lucas	-
2008	FCS	Southland	N/A	12	5	7	0	.417	7	2	5	0	.286	N/A	Mike Lucas	-
2009	FCS	Southland	N/A	11	6	5	0	.545	7	4	3	0	.571	4th	Mike Lucas	-
2010	FCS	Southland	N/A	11	2	9	0	.182	7	1	6	0	.143	T-7th	Mike Lucas	-
2011	FCS	Southland	N/A	11	3	8	0	.273	7	1	6	0	.143	7th	Mike Lucas	-
2012	FCS	Southland	N/A	11	5	6	0	.455	7	5	2	0	.714	3rd	Ron Roberts	-
2013	FCS	Southland	N/A	14	11	3	0	.786	7	7	0	0	1.000	1st	Ron Roberts	#6
2014	FCS	Southland	N/A	13	9	4	0	.692	8	7	1	0	.875	T-1st	Ron Roberts	#9
2015	FCS	Southland	N/A	11	4	7	0	.364	9	3	6	0	.333	T-8th	Ron Roberts	—
2016	FCS	Southland	N/A	11	7	4	0	.636	9	7	2	0	.464	3rd	Ron Roberts	—
2017	FCS	Southland	N/A	11	6	5	0	.545	9	6	3	0	.667	5th	Ron Roberts	—
2018	FCS	Southland	N/A	11	4	7	0	.364	9	4	5	0	.444	9th	Frank Scelfo	—
2019	FCS	Southland	N/A	13	8	5	0	.615	9	6	3	0	.667	3rd	Frank Scelfo	#19
2020	FCS	Southland	N/A	7	4	3	0	.571	6	4	2	0	.667	2nd	Frank Scelfo	#20
2021	FCS	Southland	N/A	13	9	4	0	.692	8	6	2	0	.750	2nd	Frank Scelfo	#15
2022	FCS	Southland	N/A	13	9	4	0	.692	6	5	1	0	.833	T-1st	Frank Scelfo	#17
2023	FCS	Southland	N/A	11	3	8	0	.273	7	3	4	0	.429	5th	Frank Scelfo	—
2024	FCS	Southland	N/A	12	7	5	0	.583	7	6	1	0	.857	2nd	Frank Scelfo	—
	Totals			760	396	348	17	.532	148	82	66	0	.554			
