= John Lumpkin =

John Lumpkin may refer to:

- John H. Lumpkin, U.S. representative from Georgia
- John Lumpkin (coach), American college football coach and Mississippi politician
