= R. Norval Garrett =

American football coach (1904–1973)

Biographical details
- Born: February 15, 1904; Kennard, Indiana, U.S.
- Died: April 20, 1973 (aged 69); Hammond, Louisiana, U.S.
- Education: Ball Teachers College (1928); Indiana University Bloomington; Louisiana State University

Coaching career (HC unless noted)
- 1930: Southeastern Louisiana

Head coaching record
- Overall: 2–3

Robert Norval Garrett (February 15, 1904 – April 20, 1973) was an American college football coach. He was the first head football coach at Southeastern Louisiana College—now known as Southeastern Louisiana University—in Hammond, Louisiana and he held that position for the 1930 season.

== Education ==
Garrett attended Ball Teachers College, where he did not play college football, but was a writer for the school's newspaper and focused on writing about sports. He also attended Indiana University Bloomington and Louisiana State University where he worked on his master's and doctorate.

== Career ==
Garrett taught at Walkerton High School following his graduation from Ball Teachers College in 1928. He was hired as the head football coach for Southeastern Louisiana College—now known as Southeastern Louisiana University—despite not having any coaching experience, although while attending Ball Teachers College he took courses in coaching. He resigned following only one season where he led the team to a 2–3 record after A. L. Swanson was hired. He remained with Southeastern Louisiana after his resignation as the head of business administration until his retirement in 1970.

== Personal life and death ==
Garrett had two children. He died on April 20, 1973, at a hospital in Hammond, Louisiana.

== Head coaching record ==
Year	Team	Overall	Conference	Standing	Bowl/playoffs
Southeastern Louisiana Lions (Independent) (1930)
1930	Southeastern Louisiana	2–3			
Southeastern Louisiana:		2–3			
Total:		2–3			
