= Pat Miller (coach) =

American football and basketball coach

Playing career

Football
- c. 1920: Holmesburg Athletic Club
- 1924: Pottsville Maroons

Coaching career (HC unless noted)

Football
- 1922–1924: Roman Catholic HS (PA) (assistant)
- 1925–1927: Loyola (MD) (line)
- 1928: Wake Forest (line)
- 1929–1932: Wake Forest

Basketball
- 1926–1928: Loyola (MD)
- 1928–1930: Wake Forest

Head coaching record
- Overall: 18–15–4 (football); 18–37 (basketball)

Frank S. "Pat" Miller was an American football and basketball coach. He served as the head football coach at Wake Forest College—now known as Wake Forest University—from 1929 to 1932, tallying a mark of 18–15–4. Miller was also the head basketball coach at Loyola College In Maryland—now known as Loyola University Maryland—from 1926 to 1928 and at Wake Forest from 1928 to 1930, compiling a career college basketball record of 18–37.

Miller attended Atlantic City High School and the Peddie Institute—now known as Peddie School—in Hightstown, New Jersey. He coached with Stan Cofall at Roman Catholic High School in Philadelphia before moving with Cofall to Loyola in 1925. Miller played with the Pottsville Maroons in the Anthracite League in 1924.

== Head coaching record ==
=== Football ===
Year	Team	Overall	Conference	Standing	Bowl/playoffs
Wake Forest Demon Deacons (Independent) (1928–1931)
1929	Wake Forest	6–5–1			
1930	Wake Forest	5–3–1			
1931	Wake Forest	4–4			
Wake Forest Demon Deacons (Big Five Conference) (1932)
1932	Wake Forest	3–3–2			
Wake Forest:		18–15–4			
Total:		18–15–4			
