= T. B. Shotts =

American football player and coach (1902–1950)

Biographical details
- Born: October 1, 1902
- Died: May 7, 1950 (aged 47); Florence, Alabama, U.S.

Playing career
- 1924–1927: Auburn
- Position: Fullback

Coaching career (HC unless noted)
- 1931–1937: Jacksonville State

Head coaching record
- Overall: 12–32–4

Accomplishments and honors

Awards
- All-Southern (1927)

Thomas Bolton Shotts (October 1, 1902 – May 7, 1950) was an American college football player and coach. He served as the head football coach at Jacksonville State University–then known as Jacksonville State Teachers College–from 1931 to 1937. He was a graduate of Auburn University, where he selected to the 1927 College Football All-Southern Team as a fullback.

Shotts died on May 7, 1950, at Eliza Coffee Memorial Hospital in Florence, Alabama, after a brief illness.

== Head coaching record ==
Year	Team	Overall	Conference	Standing	Bowl/playoffs
Jacksonville State Eagle Owls (Independent) (1931–1937)
1931	Jacksonville State	0–7–1			
1932	Jacksonville State	2–3–1			
1933	Jacksonville State	2–5–1			
1934	Jacksonville State	5–4			
1935	Jacksonville State	2–5			
1936	Jacksonville State	1–3–1			
1937	Jacksonville State	0–5			
Jacksonville State:		12–32–4			
Total:		12–32–4			
