= T. D. Upshaw =

American football coach, educator (1902–1970)

Biographical details
- Born: August 8, 1902; Tennessee, U.S.
- Died: May 28, 1970 (aged 67); Chattanooga, Tennessee, U.S.

Coaching career (HC unless noted)
- 1930–1931: Tennessee State
- 1933: Tennessee State (assistant)

Head coaching record
- Overall: 5–6

Taz David Upshaw Jr. (August 8, 1902 – May 28, 1970) was an American educator and college football coach. He served as the head football coach at Tennessee A&I State College—now known as Tennessee State University—in Nashville, Tennessee, from 1930 to 1931. Upshaw assisted Walter S. Davis in coaching the 1933 Tennessee State Tigers football team.

In 1935, Upshaw was appointed principal of Booker T. Washington High School in Chattanooga, Tennessee. He died suddenly, on May 28, 1970, in Chattanooga.

== Head coaching record ==
Year	Team	Overall	Conference	Standing	Bowl/playoffs
Tennessee State Tigers (Independent) (1930–1931)
1930	Tennessee State	3–3			
1931	Tennessee State	2–3			
Tennessee State:		5–6			
Total:		5–6			
