= Kenneth Beatty =

American sports coach (1905–1977)

Biographical details
- Born: April 19, 1905
- Died: September 28, 1977 (aged 72)

Coaching career (HC unless noted)

Football
- 1932–1933: East Carolina

Basketball
- 1932–1934: East Carolina

Baseball
- 1933: East Carolina

Head coaching record
- Overall: 1–10 (football); 12–17 (basketball); 3–3 (baseball)

Charles Kenneth Beatty (April 19, 1905 – September 28, 1977) was an American football, basketball and baseball coach. He was the first head football coach at East Carolina Teaching College—now known as East Carolina University—serving from 1932 to 1933 and compiling a record of 1–10. Beatty was also the head basketball coach at East Carolina from 1932 to 1934, tallying mark of 12–17. Beatty served as the second head baseball coach at East Carolina for one season in 1933, with a record of 3–3. He was inducted into the East Carolina University Hall of Fame in 1974.

== Head coaching record ==
=== Football ===
Year	Team	Overall	Conference	Standing	Bowl/playoffs
East Carolina Teachers (Independent) (1932–1933)
1932	East Carolina	0–5			
1933	East Carolina	1–5			
East Carolina:		1–10			
Total:		1–10			

== Head coaching record ==
=== Baseball ===
Record table
Season	Team	Overall	Conference	Standing	Postseason
East Carolina Teachers (Independent) (1933)
1933	East Carolina	3–3			
East Carolina:		3–3 (.500)			
Total:		3–3 (.500)			
