= Lloyd Stovall =

American football player, coach, and administrator (1911–1983)

Biographical details
- Born: August 20, 1911; Hammond, Louisiana, U.S.
- Died: October 16, 1983 (aged 72); Hammond, Louisiana, U.S.

Playing career
- 1932–1934: LSU
- Position: Center

Coaching career (HC unless noted)
- 1935–1936: Southwest Mississippi
- 1937: Pearl River (assistant)
- 1938–1940: Southeastern Louisiana

Administrative career (AD unless noted)
- 1941–1946: Southeastern Louisiana

Head coaching record
- Overall: 14–13–3 (college)

Lloyd Jackson Stovall (August 20, 1911 – October 16, 1983) was an American football coach. He was the third head football coach at Southeastern Louisiana College—now known as Southeastern Louisiana University—in Hammond, Louisiana, serving for three seasons, from 1938 to 1940, and compiling a record of 14–13–3. Stovall had previously coached football at Southwest Mississippi Junior College and Pearl River College. He played college football at Louisiana State University (LSU).

Stovall served as athletic director from 1941 to 1946 for Southeastern Louisiana.

== Head coaching record ==
=== College ===
Year	Team	Overall	Conference	Standing	Bowl/playoffs
Southeastern Louisiana Lions (Independent) (1938–1939)
1938	Southeastern Louisiana	4–4–2			
1939	Southeastern Louisiana	7–3			
Southeastern Louisiana Lions (Louisiana Intercollegiate Conference) (1940)
1940	Southeastern Louisiana	3–6–1	0–3	6th	
Southeastern Louisiana:		14–13–3	0–3		
Total:		14–13–3			
