= 1930 Delaware State Hornets football team =

American college football season

1930 Delaware State Hornets football
- Conference: Independent
- Record: 4–2
- Head coach: Unknown
- Home stadium: Dover Baseball Park

1930 Southern college football independents records
	Conf.			Overall
Team	W	L	T	W		L		T
Western Maryland		–		9	–	0	–	1
Texas Mines		–		7	–	1	–	1
Appalachian State		–		8	–	2	–	1
William & Mary Norfolk		–		3	–	1	–	0
Delaware		–		6	–	3	–	1
Furman		–		6	–	3	–	1
Delaware State		–		4	–	2	–	0
Wake Forest		–		5	–	3	–	1
Jacksonville State		–		4	–	3	–	1
Davidson		–		6	–	4	–	0
Navy		–		6	–	5	–	0
George Washington		–		4	–	4	–	1
Georgetown		–		5	–	5	–	0
Middle Tennessee State Teachers		–		5	–	5	–	1
Oglethorpe		–		4	–	4	–	1
Tennessee State		–		3	–	3	–	0
West Virginia		–		5	–	5	–	0
South Georgia Teachers		–		3	–	4	–	2
Mississippi State Teachers		–		3	–	5	–	1
Texas Tech		–		3	–	6	–	0
Troy State		–		1	–	2	–	0
Jefferson (TX)		–		1	–	3	–	0
Beacom College		–		1	–	5	–	1
Catholic University		–		1	–	8	–	0

The 1930 Delaware State Hornets football team, also called Dover State, represented Delaware State University as an independent during the 1930 college football season. Delaware State compiled a 4–2 record.

== Schedule ==
Date	Time	Opponent	Site	Result	Source
October 3	3:30 p.m.	at Howard High School	Second & DuPont Streets; Wilmington, DE	W 7–0	
October 23		Bordentown	Dover Baseball Park; Dover, DE	L 6–7	
November 1		Bowie	Dover, DE	W 18–0	
November 11		Cheyney	Dover, DE	L 0–6	
November 20		Downingtown	Dover, DE	W 14–12	
November 22		at Princess Anne	Princess Anne, MD	W 19–0	
All times are in Eastern time
