= John Lumpkin (coach) =

American football coach and politician (1892–1972)

Biographical details
- Born: March 13, 1892; Carriere, Mississippi, U.S.
- Died: January 21, 1972 (aged 79); Hattiesburg, Mississippi, U.S.

Playing career
- 1916: Ole Miss
- Position: Guard

Coaching career (HC unless noted)
- 1930: Mississippi State Teachers

Head coaching record
- Overall: 3–5–1

John Lumpkin (March 13, 1892 – January 21, 1972) was an American college football coach and politician. He was the head football coach at Mississippi State Teachers College—now known as University of Southern Mississippi—in Hattiesburg, Mississippi for one season, in 1930, compiling a record of 3–5–1. Lumpkin served in the Mississippi House of Representatives from 1928 to 1932 and the Mississippi State Senate from 1932 to 1936.

Lumpkin was born on March 13, 1892, Carriere, Mississippi and was a native of Poplarville, Mississippi. He attended the University of Mississippi, lettering for the Ole Miss Rebels football team in 1916 as a guard. He was elected team captain for the 1917 season, but left the school to serve in World War I.

Lumpkin died on January 21, 1972, at Methodist Hospital in Hattiesburg.

== Head coaching record ==
| Year | Team | Overall | Conference | Standing | Bowl/playoffs |
|---|---|---|---|---|---|
Mississippi State Teachers Yellow Jackets (Independent) (1930)
| 1930 | Mississippi State Teachers | 3–5–1 | | | |
| Mississippi State Teachers: | | 3–5–1 | | | |
| Total: | | 3–5–1 | | | |
