= 1930 Furman Purple Hurricane football team =

American college football season

1930 Furman Purple Hurricane football
- Conference: Independent
- Record: 6–3–1
- Head coach: T. B. Amis (3rd season)
- Captain: Harry Harmon
- Home stadium: Manly Field

1930 Southern college football independents records
	Conf.			Overall
Team	W	L	T	W		L		T
Western Maryland		–		9	–	0	–	1
Texas Mines		–		7	–	1	–	1
Appalachian State		–		8	–	2	–	1
William & Mary Norfolk		–		3	–	1	–	0
Delaware		–		6	–	3	–	1
Furman		–		6	–	3	–	1
Delaware State		–		4	–	2	–	0
Wake Forest		–		5	–	3	–	1
Jacksonville State		–		4	–	3	–	1
Davidson		–		6	–	4	–	0
Navy		–		6	–	5	–	0
Middle Tennessee State Teachers		–		5	–	5	–	1
West Virginia		–		5	–	5	–	0
George Washington		–		4	–	4	–	1
Oglethorpe		–		4	–	4	–	1
Georgetown		–		5	–	5	–	0
South Georgia Teachers		–		3	–	4	–	2
Mississippi State Teachers		–		3	–	5	–	1
Texas Tech		–		3	–	6	–	0
Troy State		–		1	–	2	–	0
Jefferson (TX)		–		1	–	3	–	0
Beacom College		–		1	–	5	–	1
Catholic University		–		1	–	8	–	0

The 1930 Furman Purple Hurricane football team represented Furman University as an independent during the 1930 college football season. Led by third-year head coach T. B. Amis, the Purple Hurricane compiled a record of 6–3–1.

== Schedule ==
Date	Opponent	Site	Result	Source
September 25	Newberry	Manly Field; Greenville, SC	W 49–0	
October 4	at Army	Michie Stadium; West Point, NY	L 0–54	
October 11	Erskine	Manly Field; Greenville, SC	W 35–0	
October 18	Davis & Elkins	Manly Field; Greenville, SC	T 7–7	
October 25	at Florida	Fleming Field; Gainesville, FL	W 14–13	
November 1	at Oglethorpe	Hermance Stadium; North Atlanta, GA	L 6–12	
November 8	South Carolina	Manly Field; Greenville, SC	W 14–0	
November 15	at Wofford	Snyder Field; Spartanburg, SC (rivalry)	W 14–0	
November 22	The Citadel	Manly Field; Greenville, SC (rivalry)	W 31–6	
November 27	Clemson	Manly Field; Greenville, SC	L 7–12	
