= 1930 Oglethorpe Stormy Petrels football team =

American college football season

1930 Oglethorpe Stormy Petrels football
- Conference: Independent
- Record: 4–4–1
- Head coach: Harry J. Robertson (7th season)
- Home stadium: Hermance Stadium

1930 Southern college football independents records
| | Conf. | | | Overall |
| Team | W | L | T | W | | L | | T |
|---|---|---|---|---|---|---|---|---|
| Western Maryland | | – | | 9 | – | 0 | – | 1 |
| Texas Mines | | – | | 7 | – | 1 | – | 1 |
| Appalachian State | | – | | 8 | – | 2 | – | 1 |
| William & Mary Norfolk | | – | | 3 | – | 1 | – | 0 |
| Delaware | | – | | 6 | – | 3 | – | 1 |
| Furman | | – | | 6 | – | 3 | – | 1 |
| Delaware State | | – | | 4 | – | 2 | – | 0 |
| Wake Forest | | – | | 5 | – | 3 | – | 1 |
| Jacksonville State | | – | | 4 | – | 3 | – | 1 |
| Davidson | | – | | 6 | – | 4 | – | 0 |
| Navy | | – | | 6 | – | 5 | – | 0 |
| Middle Tennessee State Teachers | | – | | 5 | – | 5 | – | 1 |
| West Virginia | | – | | 5 | – | 5 | – | 0 |
| George Washington | | – | | 4 | – | 4 | – | 1 |
| Oglethorpe | | – | | 4 | – | 4 | – | 1 |
| Georgetown | | – | | 5 | – | 5 | – | 0 |
| South Georgia Teachers | | – | | 3 | – | 4 | – | 2 |
| Mississippi State Teachers | | – | | 3 | – | 5 | – | 1 |
| Texas Tech | | – | | 3 | – | 6 | – | 0 |
| Troy State | | – | | 1 | – | 2 | – | 0 |
| Jefferson (TX) | | – | | 1 | – | 3 | – | 0 |
| Beacom College | | – | | 1 | – | 5 | – | 1 |
| Catholic University | | – | | 1 | – | 8 | – | 0 |

The 1930 Oglethorpe Stormy Petrels football team was an American football team that represented Oglethorpe University as an independent during the 1930 college football season. In their seventh year under head coach Harry J. Robertson, the Stormy Petrels compiled a 4–4–1 record.

== Schedule ==
| Date | Opponent | Site | Result | Attendance | Source |
|---|---|---|---|---|---|
| September 27 | at Georgia | Sanford Stadium; Athens, GA | L 6–31 | | |
| October 10 | at Manhattan | Polo Grounds; New York, NY | W 19–0 | 15,000 | |
| October 17 | at Dayton | University of Dayton Stadium; Dayton, OH | W 6–0 | | |
| October 25 | at Loyola (LA) | Loyola University Stadium; New Orleans, LA | W 19–0 | | |
| November 1 | Furman | Hermance Stadium; North Atlanta, GA | W 12–6 | | |
| November 8 | at Wittenberg | Wittenberg Stadium; Springfield, OH | T 0–0 | 7,000 | |
| November 15 | at Villanova | Philadelphia Municipal Stadium; Philadelphia, PA | L 6–13 | | |
| November 22 | at Mercer | Centennial Stadium; Macon, GA | L 0–2 | | |
| November 27 | at Chattanooga | Chamberlain Field; Chattanooga, TN | L 6–20 | 4,000 | |
