= 1930 West Virginia Mountaineers football team =

American college football season

1930 West Virginia Mountaineers football
- Conference: Independent
- Record: 5–5
- Head coach: Ira Rodgers (6th season)
- Captain: Walter Gordon
- Home stadium: Mountaineer Field

1930 Southern college football independents records
| | Conf. | | | Overall |
| Team | W | L | T | W | | L | | T |
|---|---|---|---|---|---|---|---|---|
| Western Maryland | | – | | 9 | – | 0 | – | 1 |
| Texas Mines | | – | | 7 | – | 1 | – | 1 |
| Appalachian State | | – | | 8 | – | 2 | – | 1 |
| William & Mary Norfolk | | – | | 3 | – | 1 | – | 0 |
| Delaware | | – | | 6 | – | 3 | – | 1 |
| Furman | | – | | 6 | – | 3 | – | 1 |
| Delaware State | | – | | 4 | – | 2 | – | 0 |
| Wake Forest | | – | | 5 | – | 3 | – | 1 |
| Jacksonville State | | – | | 4 | – | 3 | – | 1 |
| Davidson | | – | | 6 | – | 4 | – | 0 |
| Navy | | – | | 6 | – | 5 | – | 0 |
| Middle Tennessee State Teachers | | – | | 5 | – | 5 | – | 1 |
| West Virginia | | – | | 5 | – | 5 | – | 0 |
| George Washington | | – | | 4 | – | 4 | – | 1 |
| Oglethorpe | | – | | 4 | – | 4 | – | 1 |
| Georgetown | | – | | 5 | – | 5 | – | 0 |
| South Georgia Teachers | | – | | 3 | – | 4 | – | 2 |
| Mississippi State Teachers | | – | | 3 | – | 5 | – | 1 |
| Texas Tech | | – | | 3 | – | 6 | – | 0 |
| Troy State | | – | | 1 | – | 2 | – | 0 |
| Jefferson (TX) | | – | | 1 | – | 3 | – | 0 |
| Beacom College | | – | | 1 | – | 5 | – | 1 |
| Catholic University | | – | | 1 | – | 8 | – | 0 |

The 1930 West Virginia Mountaineers football team was an American football team that represented West Virginia University as an independent during the 1930 college football season. In its sixth and final season under head coach Ira Rodgers, the team compiled a 5–5 record and outscored opponents by a total of 111 to 103. The team played its home games at Mountaineer Field in Morgantown, West Virginia. Walter Gordon was the team captain.

== Schedule ==
| Date | Opponent | Site | Result | Attendance | Source |
|---|---|---|---|---|---|
| September 19 | at Duquesne | Forbes Field; Pittsburgh, PA | W 7–0 | 25,000 | |
| September 27 | West Virginia Wesleyan | Mountaineer Field; Morgantown, WV | W 26–0 | | |
| October 4 | Pittsburgh | Mountaineer Field; Morgantown, WV (rivalry) | L 0–16 | 22,000 | |
| October 11 | vs. Washington and Lee | Laidley Field; Charleston, WV | W 33–13 | 14,000 | |
| October 17 | at Detroit | University of Detroit Stadium; Detroit, MI | L 0–23 | 20,000 | |
| October 24 | at Georgetown | Griffith Stadium; Washington, DC | W 14–7 | 10,000 | |
| November 1 | at Fordham | Polo Grounds; New York, NY | L 2–18 | 15,000 | |
| November 8 | Kansas State | Mountaineer Field; Morgantown, WV | W 23–7 | | |
| November 22 | Washington & Jefferson | Mountaineer Field; Morgantown, WV | L 6–7 | | |
| November 27 | vs. Oregon State | Soldier Field; Chicago, IL | L 0–12 | 20,000 | |
