= 1930 Middle Tennessee State Teachers football team =

American college football season

1930 Middle Tennessee State Teachers football
- Conference: Independent
- Record: 5–5–1
- Head coach: Frank Faulkinberry (5th season)
- Captain: Julian Crocker

1930 Southern college football independents records
	Conf.			Overall
Team	W	L	T	W		L		T
Western Maryland		–		9	–	0	–	1
Texas Mines		–		7	–	1	–	1
Appalachian State		–		8	–	2	–	1
William & Mary Norfolk		–		3	–	1	–	0
Delaware		–		6	–	3	–	1
Furman		–		6	–	3	–	1
Delaware State		–		4	–	2	–	0
Wake Forest		–		5	–	3	–	1
Jacksonville State		–		4	–	3	–	1
Davidson		–		6	–	4	–	0
Navy		–		6	–	5	–	0
Middle Tennessee State Teachers		–		5	–	5	–	1
West Virginia		–		5	–	5	–	0
George Washington		–		4	–	4	–	1
Oglethorpe		–		4	–	4	–	1
Georgetown		–		5	–	5	–	0
South Georgia Teachers		–		3	–	4	–	2
Mississippi State Teachers		–		3	–	5	–	1
Texas Tech		–		3	–	6	–	0
Troy State		–		1	–	2	–	0
Jefferson (TX)		–		1	–	3	–	0
Beacom College		–		1	–	5	–	1
Catholic University		–		1	–	8	–	0

The 1930 Middle Tennessee State Teachers football team represented the Middle Tennessee State Teachers College (now known as Middle Tennessee State University) as an independent during the 1930 college football season. Led by fifth-year head coach Frank Faulkinberry, Middle Tennessee State Teachers compiled a record of 5–5–1. The team's captain was Julian Crocker.

== Schedule ==
Date	Opponent	Site	Result	Source
September 13	at Vanderbilt freshmen	Nashville, TN	L 0–28	
September 20	at Chattanooga	Chamberlain Field; Chattanooga, TN	L 0–25	
September 27	Lincoln Memorial	Murfreesboro, TN	W 36–0	
October 4	at Vanderbilt freshmen	Nashville, TN	L 0–13	
October 11	Jacksonville State	Murfreesboro, TN	W 18–0	
October 18	at Western Kentucky State Normal	Bowling Green, KY (rivalry)	L 7–13	
October 25	at Tennessee Wesleyan	Athens, TN	L 6–13	
November 1	Murray State	Murfreesboro, TN	W 19–0	
November 8	Bethel (TN)	Murfreesboro, TN	W 27–0	
November 15	at Piedmont	Demorest, GA	W 12–6	
November 29	Tennessee Tech	Murfreesboro, TN	T 0–0	
