= 1930 Jefferson Lawyers football team =

American college football season

1930 Jefferson Lawyers football
- Conference: Independent
- Record: 1–3
- Head coach: Clyde Waller (1st season, 3 games); Buddie King (1st season, 1 game)
- Captain: Frankie Estes
- Home stadium: Oak Cliff Field; North Dallas High School

1930 Southern college football independents records
	Conf.			Overall
Team	W	L	T	W		L		T
Western Maryland		–		9	–	0	–	1
Texas Mines		–		7	–	1	–	1
Appalachian State		–		8	–	2	–	1
William & Mary Norfolk		–		3	–	1	–	0
Delaware		–		6	–	3	–	1
Furman		–		6	–	3	–	1
Delaware State		–		4	–	2	–	0
Wake Forest		–		5	–	3	–	1
Jacksonville State		–		4	–	3	–	1
Davidson		–		6	–	4	–	0
Navy		–		6	–	5	–	0
Middle Tennessee State Teachers		–		5	–	5	–	1
West Virginia		–		5	–	5	–	0
George Washington		–		4	–	4	–	1
Oglethorpe		–		4	–	4	–	1
Georgetown		–		5	–	5	–	0
South Georgia Teachers		–		3	–	4	–	2
Mississippi State Teachers		–		3	–	5	–	1
Texas Tech		–		3	–	6	–	0
Troy State		–		1	–	2	–	0
Jefferson (TX)		–		1	–	3	–	0
Beacom College		–		1	–	5	–	1
Catholic University		–		1	–	8	–	0

The 1930 Jefferson Lawyers football team was an American football team that represented Jefferson Law School in Dallas, Texas, (eventually known as Jefferson University by 1931) during the 1930 college football season. In its first season of intercollegiate football, Jefferson compiled a 1–3 record. Clyde Waller was the head coach and was succeeded by Buddie King for the last game. Frankie Estes was the team captain. The team played its home games at high school fields in Dallas.

Jefferson Law School was opened in 1919 originally as just a law school by Andrew J. Priest in downtown. One of its early faculty members was Judge Sarah T. Hughes. The school achieved some success training lawyers and had a high graduation rate. Jefferson was rebranded as Jefferson University in 1931 as it added additional colleges such as engineering, liberal arts, business, commerce, and secretarial training. Its first intercollegiate football game was against Southwest Vocational College, located in the Oak Cliff section of Dallas. Jefferson won that first game 25–6, but finished its season with three losses.

== Schedule ==
Date	Opponent	Site	Result	Source
November 1	Southwest Vocational College	Oak Cliff Field; Dallas, TX	W 25–6	
November 11	at Tarleton Agricultural College	Stephenville, TX	L 0–43	
November 22	at Weatherford	Weatherford, TX	L 2–25	
November 27	Peacock Military Academy's cavalry division in Dallas	North Dallas High School; Dallas, TX	L 0–29	
