= 1930 South Georgia Teachers Blue Tide football team =

American college football season

1930 South Georgia Teachers Blue Tide football
- Conference: Independent
- Record: 2–3–2
- Head coach: Crook Smith (2nd season)

1930 Southern college football independents records
	Conf.			Overall
Team	W	L	T	W		L		T
Western Maryland		–		9	–	0	–	1
Texas Mines		–		7	–	1	–	1
Appalachian State		–		8	–	2	–	1
William & Mary Norfolk		–		3	–	1	–	0
Delaware		–		6	–	3	–	1
Furman		–		6	–	3	–	1
Delaware State		–		4	–	2	–	0
Wake Forest		–		5	–	3	–	1
Jacksonville State		–		4	–	3	–	1
Davidson		–		6	–	4	–	0
Navy		–		6	–	5	–	0
Middle Tennessee State Teachers		–		5	–	5	–	1
West Virginia		–		5	–	5	–	0
George Washington		–		4	–	4	–	1
Oglethorpe		–		4	–	4	–	1
Georgetown		–		5	–	5	–	0
South Georgia Teachers		–		3	–	4	–	2
Mississippi State Teachers		–		3	–	5	–	1
Texas Tech		–		3	–	6	–	0
Troy State		–		1	–	2	–	0
Jefferson (TX)		–		1	–	3	–	0
Beacom College		–		1	–	5	–	1
Catholic University		–		1	–	8	–	0

The 1930 South Georgia Teachers Blue Tide football team represented the South Georgia Teachers College—now known as Georgia Southern University—during the 1930 college football season. The team was led by Crook Smith in his second year as head coach.

== Schedule ==
Date	Opponent	Site	Result	Source
September 26	South Georgia State	Statesboro, GA	L 0–6	
October 3	vs. Newberry	Savannah, GA	T 0–0	
October 17	Middle Georgia	Statesboro, GA	L 0–14	
October 31	Piedmont	Statesboro, GA	W 7–6	
November 14	Norman Junior College	Statesboro, GA	L 0–6	
November 27	Brewton–Parker	Statesboro, GA	W 26–0	
January 1, 1931	vs. All-Stars	Savannah, GA	T 0–0	
