= 1930 George Washington Colonials football team =

American college football season

1930 George Washington Colonials football
- Conference: Independent
- Record: 4–4–1
- Head coach: Jim Pixlee (2nd season)
- Home stadium: Griffith Stadium

1930 Southern college football independents records
| | Conf. | | | Overall |
| Team | W | L | T | W | | L | | T |
|---|---|---|---|---|---|---|---|---|
| Western Maryland | | – | | 9 | – | 0 | – | 1 |
| Texas Mines | | – | | 7 | – | 1 | – | 1 |
| Appalachian State | | – | | 8 | – | 2 | – | 1 |
| William & Mary Norfolk | | – | | 3 | – | 1 | – | 0 |
| Delaware | | – | | 6 | – | 3 | – | 1 |
| Furman | | – | | 6 | – | 3 | – | 1 |
| Delaware State | | – | | 4 | – | 2 | – | 0 |
| Wake Forest | | – | | 5 | – | 3 | – | 1 |
| Jacksonville State | | – | | 4 | – | 3 | – | 1 |
| Davidson | | – | | 6 | – | 4 | – | 0 |
| Navy | | – | | 6 | – | 5 | – | 0 |
| Middle Tennessee State Teachers | | – | | 5 | – | 5 | – | 1 |
| West Virginia | | – | | 5 | – | 5 | – | 0 |
| George Washington | | – | | 4 | – | 4 | – | 1 |
| Oglethorpe | | – | | 4 | – | 4 | – | 1 |
| Georgetown | | – | | 5 | – | 5 | – | 0 |
| South Georgia Teachers | | – | | 3 | – | 4 | – | 2 |
| Mississippi State Teachers | | – | | 3 | – | 5 | – | 1 |
| Texas Tech | | – | | 3 | – | 6 | – | 0 |
| Troy State | | – | | 1 | – | 2 | – | 0 |
| Jefferson (TX) | | – | | 1 | – | 3 | – | 0 |
| Beacom College | | – | | 1 | – | 5 | – | 1 |
| Catholic University | | – | | 1 | – | 8 | – | 0 |

The 1930 George Washington Colonials football team was an American football team that represented George Washington University as an independent during the 1930 college football season. In their second season under head coach Jim Pixlee, the team compiled a 4–4–1 record.

== Schedule ==
| Date | Opponent | Site | Result | Attendance | Source |
|---|---|---|---|---|---|
| October 4 | at Rutgers | Neilson Field; New Brunswick, NJ | L 6–20 | 6,500 | |
| October 11 | at Delaware | Frazer Field; Newark, DE | W 9–6 | 4,000 | |
| October 17 | South Dakota | Griffith Stadium; Washington, DC | T 0–0 | 7,000 | |
| October 25 | Dickinson | Griffith Stadium; Washington, DC | W 27–6 | | |
| October 31 | at Tulsa | Skelly Field; Tulsa, OK | L 7–14 | | |
| November 8 | New York Aggies | Griffith Stadium; Washington, DC | W 86–0 | | |
| November 15 | at Albright | Reading, PA | L 0–33 | | |
| November 21 | Catholic University | Griffith Stadium; Washington, D.C. | W 18–13 | | |
| November 29 | at Navy | Thompson Stadium; Annapolis, MD | L 0–20 | | |
