= 1930 Delaware Fightin' Blue Hens football team =

American college football season

1930 Delaware Fightin' Blue Hens football
- Conference: Independent
- Record: 6–3–1
- Head coach: Gus Ziegler (2nd season)
- Home stadium: Frazer Field

1930 Southern college football independents records
	Conf.			Overall
Team	W	L	T	W		L		T
Western Maryland		–		9	–	0	–	1
Texas Mines		–		7	–	1	–	1
Appalachian State		–		8	–	2	–	1
William & Mary Norfolk		–		3	–	1	–	0
Delaware		–		6	–	3	–	1
Furman		–		6	–	3	–	1
Delaware State		–		4	–	2	–	0
Wake Forest		–		5	–	3	–	1
Jacksonville State		–		4	–	3	–	1
Davidson		–		6	–	4	–	0
Navy		–		6	–	5	–	0
Middle Tennessee State Teachers		–		5	–	5	–	1
West Virginia		–		5	–	5	–	0
George Washington		–		4	–	4	–	1
Oglethorpe		–		4	–	4	–	1
Georgetown		–		5	–	5	–	0
South Georgia Teachers		–		3	–	4	–	2
Mississippi State Teachers		–		3	–	5	–	1
Texas Tech		–		3	–	6	–	0
Troy State		–		1	–	2	–	0
Jefferson (TX)		–		1	–	3	–	0
Beacom College		–		1	–	5	–	1
Catholic University		–		1	–	8	–	0

The 1930 Delaware Fightin' Blue Hens football team was an American football team that represented the University of Delaware in the 1930 college football season. In its second and final season under head coach Gus Ziegler, the team compiled a 6–3–1 record and outscored opponents by a total of 138 to 117.

== Schedule ==
Date	Opponent	Site	Result	Source
October 4	at Saint Joseph's	54th at City Line Field; Philadelphia, PA	W 13–6	
October 11	George Washington	Frazer Field; Newark, DE	L 6–9	
October 18	Gallaudet	Frazer Field; Newark, DE	W 38–0	
October 25	at Rutgers	Neilson Field; New Brunswick, NJ	L 0–40	
November 1	at Swarthmore	Clothier Field Stadium; Swarthmore, PA	W 13–12	
November 8	Mount St. Mary's	Frazer Field; Newark, DE	W 13–6	
November 15	at Drexel	Drexel Field; Philadelphia, PA	T 13–13	
November 23	Haverford	Frazer Field; Newark, DE	W 14–7	
November 27	at Pennsylvania Military	Chester, PA	L 2–10	
November 29	Fort DuPont	Frazer Field; Newark, DE	W 26–14	
