= 1930 Texas Mines Miners football team =

American college football season

1930 Texas Mines Miners football
- Conference: Independent
- Record: 7–1–1
- Head coach: Mack Saxon (2nd season)
- Home stadium: El Paso High School Stadium

1930 Southern college football independents records
	Conf.			Overall
Team	W	L	T	W		L		T
Western Maryland		–		9	–	0	–	1
Texas Mines		–		7	–	1	–	1
Appalachian State		–		8	–	2	–	1
William & Mary Norfolk		–		3	–	1	–	0
Delaware		–		6	–	3	–	1
Furman		–		6	–	3	–	1
Delaware State		–		4	–	2	–	0
Wake Forest		–		5	–	3	–	1
Jacksonville State		–		4	–	3	–	1
Davidson		–		6	–	4	–	0
Navy		–		6	–	5	–	0
Middle Tennessee State Teachers		–		5	–	5	–	1
West Virginia		–		5	–	5	–	0
George Washington		–		4	–	4	–	1
Oglethorpe		–		4	–	4	–	1
Georgetown		–		5	–	5	–	0
South Georgia Teachers		–		3	–	4	–	2
Mississippi State Teachers		–		3	–	5	–	1
Texas Tech		–		3	–	6	–	0
Troy State		–		1	–	2	–	0
Jefferson (TX)		–		1	–	3	–	0
Beacom College		–		1	–	5	–	1
Catholic University		–		1	–	8	–	0

The 1930 Texas Mines Miners football team was an American football team that represented Texas School of Mines (now known as the University of Texas at El Paso) as an independent during the 1930 college football season. In its second season under head coach Mack Saxon, the team compiled a 7–1–1 record and outscored opponents by a total of 186 to 67.

== Schedule ==
Date	Opponent	Site	Result	Source
September 27	at Texas	War Memorial Stadium; Austin, TX	L 0–28	
October 4	Arizona State	El Paso High School Stadium; El Paso, TX	W 19–6	
October 11	Gila College	El Paso High School Stadium; El Paso, TX	W 39–6	
October 17	at Texas Tech	Tech Field; Lubbock, TX	W 31–0	
October 24	New Mexico Military^{†}	El Paso High School Stadium; El Paso, TX	W 27–7	
November 1	at New Mexico	University Field; Albuquerque, NM	W 20–13	
November 8	Arizona	El Paso High School Stadium; El Paso, TX	T 0–0	
November 15	at New Mexico A&M	Miller Field; Las Cruces, NM	W 25–0	
November 27	Sul Ross	El Paso High School Stadium; El Paso, TX	W 25–7	
^{†}Homecoming
