= 1930 Troy State Trojans football team =

American college football season

1930 Troy State Trojans football
- Conference: Independent
- Record: 1–2
- Head coach: Coach Baxter
- Home stadium: Pace Field

1930 Southern college football independents records
	Conf.			Overall
Team	W	L	T	W		L		T
Western Maryland		–		9	–	0	–	1
Texas Mines		–		7	–	1	–	1
Appalachian State		–		8	–	2	–	1
William & Mary Norfolk		–		3	–	1	–	0
Delaware		–		6	–	3	–	1
Furman		–		6	–	3	–	1
Delaware State		–		4	–	2	–	0
Wake Forest		–		5	–	3	–	1
Jacksonville State		–		4	–	3	–	1
Davidson		–		6	–	4	–	0
Navy		–		6	–	5	–	0
Middle Tennessee State Teachers		–		5	–	5	–	1
West Virginia		–		5	–	5	–	0
George Washington		–		4	–	4	–	1
Oglethorpe		–		4	–	4	–	1
Georgetown		–		5	–	5	–	0
South Georgia Teachers		–		3	–	4	–	2
Mississippi State Teachers		–		3	–	5	–	1
Texas Tech		–		3	–	6	–	0
Troy State		–		1	–	2	–	0
Jefferson (TX)		–		1	–	3	–	0
Beacom College		–		1	–	5	–	1
Catholic University		–		1	–	8	–	0

The 1930 Troy State Red Wave football team represented Troy State Teachers College (now known as Troy University) as an independent during the 1930 college football season. Led by Coach Baxter, the Trojans compiled an overall record of 1–2.

== Schedule ==
Date	Time	Opponent	Site	Result	Source
October 12		Maxwell Field	Pace Field; Troy, AL	W 7–6	
November 22	3:30 p.m.	Troy alumni	Pace Field; Troy, AL	L 0–6	
November 26		at Marion	Johnson Field; Marion, AL	L 0–31	
All times are in Central time
