= 1930 Texas Tech Matadors football team =

American college football season

1930 Texas Tech Matadors football
- Conference: Independent
- Record: 3–6
- Head coach: Pete Cawthon (1st season)
- Offensive scheme: Single-wing
- Base defense: 6–2
- Captain: Jack Durham
- Home stadium: Tech Field

1930 Southern college football independents records
	Conf.			Overall
Team	W	L	T	W		L		T
Western Maryland		–		9	–	0	–	1
Texas Mines		–		7	–	1	–	1
Appalachian State		–		8	–	2	–	1
William & Mary Norfolk		–		3	–	1	–	0
Delaware		–		6	–	3	–	1
Furman		–		6	–	3	–	1
Delaware State		–		4	–	2	–	0
Wake Forest		–		5	–	3	–	1
Jacksonville State		–		4	–	3	–	1
Davidson		–		6	–	4	–	0
Navy		–		6	–	5	–	0
Middle Tennessee State Teachers		–		5	–	5	–	1
West Virginia		–		5	–	5	–	0
George Washington		–		4	–	4	–	1
Oglethorpe		–		4	–	4	–	1
Georgetown		–		5	–	5	–	0
South Georgia Teachers		–		3	–	4	–	2
Mississippi State Teachers		–		3	–	5	–	1
Texas Tech		–		3	–	6	–	0
Troy State		–		1	–	2	–	0
Jefferson (TX)		–		1	–	3	–	0
Beacom College		–		1	–	5	–	1
Catholic University		–		1	–	8	–	0

The 1930 Texas Tech Matadors football team represented Texas Technological College—now known as Texas Tech University—as an independent during the 1930 college football season. In their first season under head coach Pete Cawthon, the Matadors compiled a 3–6 record and were outscored by opponents by a combined total of 122 to 90. The team played its home games at Tech Field.

== Schedule ==
Date	Opponent	Site	Result	Attendance	Source
September 27	Wayland	Tech Field; Lubbock, TX	L 0–6	3,500	
October 3	New Mexico A&M	Tech Field; Lubbock, TX	W 14–0	1,000	
October 11	McMurry	Tech Field; Lubbock, TX	W 10–0		
October 17	Texas Mines	Tech Field; Lubbock, TX	L 0–31		
October 25	at TCU	Amon G. Carter Stadium; Fort Worth, TX (rivalry)	L 0–26	4,000	
November 1	at West Texas State	Buffalo Stadium; Canyon, TX	L 0–6		
November 11	Abilene Christian	Tech Field; Lubbock, TX	W 53–6		
November 19	at Howard Payne	Brownwood, TX	L 7–26		
November 27	Simmons (TX)^{†}	Tech Field; Lubbock, TX	L 6–20	3,500	
^{†}Homecoming
