= 1930 Catholic University Cardinals football team =

American college football season

1930 Catholic University Cardinals football
- Conference: Independent
- Record: 1–8
- Head coach: Dutch Bergman (1st season)
- Home stadium: Brookland Stadium, Griffith Stadium

1930 Southern college football independents records
	Conf.			Overall
Team	W	L	T	W		L		T
Western Maryland		–		9	–	0	–	1
Texas Mines		–		7	–	1	–	1
Appalachian State		–		8	–	2	–	1
William & Mary Norfolk		–		3	–	1	–	0
Delaware		–		6	–	3	–	1
Furman		–		6	–	3	–	1
Delaware State		–		4	–	2	–	0
Wake Forest		–		5	–	3	–	1
Jacksonville State		–		4	–	3	–	1
Davidson		–		6	–	4	–	0
Navy		–		6	–	5	–	0
Middle Tennessee State Teachers		–		5	–	5	–	1
West Virginia		–		5	–	5	–	0
George Washington		–		4	–	4	–	1
Oglethorpe		–		4	–	4	–	1
Georgetown		–		5	–	5	–	0
South Georgia Teachers		–		3	–	4	–	2
Mississippi State Teachers		–		3	–	5	–	1
Texas Tech		–		3	–	6	–	0
Troy State		–		1	–	2	–	0
Jefferson (TX)		–		1	–	3	–	0
Beacom College		–		1	–	5	–	1
Catholic University		–		1	–	8	–	0

The 1930 Catholic University Cardinals football team was an American football team that represented the Catholic University of America as an independent during the 1930 college football season. In its first year under head coach Dutch Bergman, the team compiled a 1–8 record and was outscored by a total of 181 to 115.

== Schedule ==
Date	Opponent	Site	Result	Source
September 27	Boston College	Fenway Park; Boston, MA	L 7–54	
October 4	Franklin & Marshall	Brookland Stadium; Washington, DC	L 7–22	
October 11	Holy Cross	Fitton Field; Worcester, MA	L 7–27	
October 18	Loyola (MD)	Griffith Stadium; Washington, DC	L 6–20	
October 24	Duquesne	Forbes Field; Pittsburgh, PA	L 0–13	
November 1	New River State	Washington, DC	L 6–20	
November 8	American	Washington, DC	W 60–0	
November 14	at Manhattan	Innisfail Park; Bronx, NY	L 6–7	
November 21	vs. George Washington	Griffith Stadium; Washington, DC	L 13–18	
