= 1930 Mississippi State Teachers Yellow Jackets football team =

American college football season

1930 Mississippi State Teachers Yellow Jackets football
- Conference: Independent
- Record: 3–5–1
- Head coach: John Lumpkin (1st season)
- Home stadium: State Teachers Field

1930 Southern college football independents records
	Conf.			Overall
Team	W	L	T	W		L		T
Western Maryland		–		9	–	0	–	1
Texas Mines		–		7	–	1	–	1
Appalachian State		–		8	–	2	–	1
William & Mary Norfolk		–		3	–	1	–	0
Delaware		–		6	–	3	–	1
Furman		–		6	–	3	–	1
Delaware State		–		4	–	2	–	0
Wake Forest		–		5	–	3	–	1
Jacksonville State		–		4	–	3	–	1
Davidson		–		6	–	4	–	0
Navy		–		6	–	5	–	0
Middle Tennessee State Teachers		–		5	–	5	–	1
West Virginia		–		5	–	5	–	0
George Washington		–		4	–	4	–	1
Oglethorpe		–		4	–	4	–	1
Georgetown		–		5	–	5	–	0
South Georgia Teachers		–		3	–	4	–	2
Mississippi State Teachers		–		3	–	5	–	1
Texas Tech		–		3	–	6	–	0
Troy State		–		1	–	2	–	0
Jefferson (TX)		–		1	–	3	–	0
Beacom College		–		1	–	5	–	1
Catholic University		–		1	–	8	–	0

The 1930 Mississippi State Teachers Yellow Jackets football team was an American football team that represented the Mississippi State Teachers College (now known as the University of Southern Mississippi) as an independent during the 1930 college football season. In their first year under head coach John Lumpkin, the team compiled a 3–5–1 record.

== Schedule ==
Date	Opponent	Site	Result	Source
September 27	Clarke College (MS)	State Teachers Field; Hattiesburg, MS	W 45–0	
October 4	at Millsaps	Jackson, MS	L 0–26	
October 11	at Mississippi College	Provine Field; Clinton, MS	L 6–18	
October 18	at Southwestern Louisiana	S.L.I. Stadium; Lafayette, LA	L 0–14	
October 25	Louisiana College	State Teachers Field; Hattiesburg, MS	W 47–20	
November 1	Spring Hill	State Teachers Field; Hattiesburg, MS	L 6–7	
November 14	at Louisiana Normal	Demon Field; Natchitoches, LA	L 12–32	
November 22	Delta State	State Teachers Field; Hattiesburg, MS	W 46–0	
November 27	Union (TN)	State Teachers Field; Hattiesburg, MS	T 0–0	
