= 1930 Western Maryland Green Terror football team =

American college football season

1930 Western Maryland Green Terror football
- Conference: Independent
- Record: 9–0–1
- Head coach: Dick Harlow (5th season)
- Captain: Paul L. Bates

1930 Southern college football independents records
	Conf.			Overall
Team	W	L	T	W		L		T
Western Maryland		–		9	–	0	–	1
Texas Mines		–		7	–	1	–	1
Appalachian State		–		8	–	2	–	1
William & Mary Norfolk		–		3	–	1	–	0
Delaware		–		6	–	3	–	1
Furman		–		6	–	3	–	1
Delaware State		–		4	–	2	–	0
Wake Forest		–		5	–	3	–	1
Jacksonville State		–		4	–	3	–	1
Davidson		–		6	–	4	–	0
Navy		–		6	–	5	–	0
Middle Tennessee State Teachers		–		5	–	5	–	1
West Virginia		–		5	–	5	–	0
George Washington		–		4	–	4	–	1
Oglethorpe		–		4	–	4	–	1
Georgetown		–		5	–	5	–	0
South Georgia Teachers		–		3	–	4	–	2
Mississippi State Teachers		–		3	–	5	–	1
Texas Tech		–		3	–	6	–	0
Troy State		–		1	–	2	–	0
Jefferson (TX)		–		1	–	3	–	0
Beacom College		–		1	–	5	–	1
Catholic University		–		1	–	8	–	0

The 1930 Western Maryland Green Terror football team was an American football team that represented Western Maryland College (now known as McDaniel College) as an independent during the 1930 college football season. In its fifth season under head coach Dick Harlow, the team compiled a 9–0–1 record and shut out eight of its ten opponents. Paul L. Bates was the team's captain. Western Maryland played home games at Hoffa Field on Westminster, Maryland.

Western Maryland's 1930 season was part of a 27-game undefeated streak that started in 1928 and continued into 1931. Harlow was later inducted into the College Football Hall of Fame.

== Schedule ==
Date	Opponent	Site	Result	Attendance	Source
October 3	at Baltimore	Oriole Park; Baltimore, MD	W 59–0	5,000	
October 10	vs. St. John's (MD)	Oriole Park; Baltimore, MD	W 18–0	8,000	
October 18	vs. Georgetown	Baltimore Stadium; Baltimore, MD	W 10–0	18,000	
October 25	vs. Loyola (MD)	Baltimore Stadium; Baltimore, MD	W 40–7		
November 1	vs. Quantico Marines	Griffith Stadium; Washington, DC	W 20–0		
November 8	at John Carroll	Cleveland, OH	W 27–0		
November 15	Mount St. Mary's	Westminster, MD	W 33–0	5,000	
November 22	at Albright	Albright Stadium; Reading, PA	T 7–7		
November 29	at Muhlenberg	Muhlenberg Field; Allentown, PA	W 25–0		
December 6	vs. Maryland	Baltimore Stadium; Baltimore, MD	W 7–0	8,000	
