= 1930 Appalachian State Mountaineers football team =

American college football season

1930 Appalachian State Mountaineers football
- Conference: Independent
- Record: 8–2–1
- Head coach: C. B. Johnston (2nd season)
- Home stadium: College Field

1930 Southern college football independents records
	Conf.			Overall
Team	W	L	T	W		L		T
Western Maryland		–		9	–	0	–	1
Texas Mines		–		7	–	1	–	1
Appalachian State		–		8	–	2	–	1
William & Mary Norfolk		–		3	–	1	–	0
Delaware		–		6	–	3	–	1
Furman		–		6	–	3	–	1
Delaware State		–		4	–	2	–	0
Wake Forest		–		5	–	3	–	1
Jacksonville State		–		4	–	3	–	1
Davidson		–		6	–	4	–	0
Navy		–		6	–	5	–	0
Middle Tennessee State Teachers		–		5	–	5	–	1
West Virginia		–		5	–	5	–	0
George Washington		–		4	–	4	–	1
Oglethorpe		–		4	–	4	–	1
Georgetown		–		5	–	5	–	0
South Georgia Teachers		–		3	–	4	–	2
Mississippi State Teachers		–		3	–	5	–	1
Texas Tech		–		3	–	6	–	0
Troy State		–		1	–	2	–	0
Jefferson (TX)		–		1	–	3	–	0
Beacom College		–		1	–	5	–	1
Catholic University		–		1	–	8	–	0

The 1930 Appalachian State Mountaineers football team was an American football team that represented Appalachian State Teachers College (now known as Appalachian State University) as an independent during the 1930 college football season. In their second year under head coach C. B. Johnston, the Mountaineers compiled an overall record of 8–2–1.

== Schedule ==
Date	Opponent	Site	Result	Source
September 20	vs. Lincoln Memorial	Winston-Salem, NC	W 34–0	
September 27	at King	Tenneva Field; Bristol, TN	L 7–18	
October 4	at Tusculum	Pioneer Field; Tusculum, TN	W 13–0	
October 11	Catawba	College Field; Boone, NC	T 13–13	
October 18	Atlantic Christian	College Field; Boone, NC	W 61–12	
October 25	West Liberty	College Field; Boone, NC	W 14–13	
November 7	at Apprentice	Apprentice Athletic Field; Newport News, VA	W 7–0	
November 8	at Atlantic University	Atlantic University Field; Virginia Beach, VA	W 6–0	
November 15	at High Point	High Point, NC	L 6–13	
November 22	Boiling Springs Junior College	College Field; Boone, NC	W 27–0	
November 27	at Piedmont	Demorest, GA	W 14–0	
