= 1930 Navy Midshipmen football team =

American college football season

1930 Navy Midshipmen football
- Conference: Independent
- Record: 6–5
- Head coach: Bill Ingram (5th season)
- Captain: Bob Bowstrom
- Home stadium: Thompson Stadium

1930 Southern college football independents records
	Conf.			Overall
Team	W	L	T	W		L		T
Western Maryland		–		9	–	0	–	1
Texas Mines		–		7	–	1	–	1
Appalachian State		–		8	–	2	–	1
William & Mary Norfolk		–		3	–	1	–	0
Delaware		–		6	–	3	–	1
Furman		–		6	–	3	–	1
Delaware State		–		4	–	2	–	0
Wake Forest		–		5	–	3	–	1
Jacksonville State		–		4	–	3	–	1
Davidson		–		6	–	4	–	0
Navy		–		6	–	5	–	0
Middle Tennessee State Teachers		–		5	–	5	–	1
West Virginia		–		5	–	5	–	0
George Washington		–		4	–	4	–	1
Oglethorpe		–		4	–	4	–	1
Georgetown		–		5	–	5	–	0
South Georgia Teachers		–		3	–	4	–	2
Mississippi State Teachers		–		3	–	5	–	1
Texas Tech		–		3	–	6	–	0
Troy State		–		1	–	2	–	0
Jefferson (TX)		–		1	–	3	–	0
Beacom College		–		1	–	5	–	1
Catholic University		–		1	–	8	–	0

The 1930 Navy Midshipmen football team represented the United States Naval Academy during the 1930 college football season. In their fifth season under head coach Bill Ingram, the Midshipmen compiled a 6–5 record, shut out four opponents, and outscored all opponents by a combined score of 148 to 117.

== Schedule ==
Date	Opponent	Site	Result	Attendance	Source
October 4	William & Mary	Thompson Stadium; Annapolis, MD	W 19–6		
October 11	at Notre Dame	Notre Dame Stadium; Notre Dame, IN (rivalry)	L 2–26	40,593	
October 18	Duke	Thompson Stadium; Annapolis, MD	L 0–18		
October 25	at Princeton	Palmer Stadium; Princeton, NJ	W 31–0	45,000	
November 1	West Virginia Wesleyan	Thompson Stadium; Annapolis, MD	W 37–14		
November 8	Ohio State	Municipal Stadium; Baltimore, MD	L 0–27	45,000	
November 15	SMU	Municipal Stadium; Baltimore, MD (rivalry)	L 7–20		
November 22	Maryland	Thompson Stadium; Annapolis, MD (rivalry)	W 6–0	23,000	
November 29	George Washington	Thompson Stadium; Annapolis, MD	W 20–0		
December 6	at Penn	Franklin Field; Philadelphia, PA	W 26–0	60,000	
December 13	vs. Army	Yankee Stadium; Bronx, NY (Army–Navy Game)	L 0–6	75,000	
