= 1930 Beacom College football team =

American college football season

1930 Beacom College football
- Conference: Independent
- Record: 1–5–1
- Head coach: John D. Naylor (2nd season)
- Home stadium: Baynard Stadium

1930 Southern college football independents records
	Conf.			Overall
Team	W	L	T	W		L		T
Western Maryland		–		9	–	0	–	1
Texas Mines		–		7	–	1	–	1
Appalachian State		–		8	–	2	–	1
William & Mary Norfolk		–		3	–	1	–	0
Delaware		–		6	–	3	–	1
Furman		–		6	–	3	–	1
Delaware State		–		4	–	2	–	0
Wake Forest		–		5	–	3	–	1
Jacksonville State		–		4	–	3	–	1
Davidson		–		6	–	4	–	0
Navy		–		6	–	5	–	0
Middle Tennessee State Teachers		–		5	–	5	–	1
West Virginia		–		5	–	5	–	0
George Washington		–		4	–	4	–	1
Oglethorpe		–		4	–	4	–	1
Georgetown		–		5	–	5	–	0
South Georgia Teachers		–		3	–	4	–	2
Mississippi State Teachers		–		3	–	5	–	1
Texas Tech		–		3	–	6	–	0
Troy State		–		1	–	2	–	0
Jefferson (TX)		–		1	–	3	–	0
Beacom College		–		1	–	5	–	1
Catholic University		–		1	–	8	–	0

The 1930 Beacom College football team represented Beacom College (now known as Goldey–Beacom College) in the 1930 college football season as an independent. Led by second-year head coach John D. Naylor, Beacom compiled a 1–5–1 record.

== Schedule ==
Date	Time	Opponent	Site	Result	Source
September 27		at Newark High School	Newark Field; Newark, DE	L 0–6	
October 3	3:30 p.m.	Wilmington High School	Baynard Stadium; Wilmington, DE	L 0–24	
		Pennsylvania Military College freshmen		L 6–7	
		West Nottingham Academy		T 0–0	
October 24		Penns Grove High School		L 0–13	
October 31	3:30 p.m.	Wesley	Baynard Stadium; Wilmington, DE	W 19–0	
		Lansdowne High School		L 0–45	
