= 1930 Jacksonville State Eagle Owls football team =

American college football season

1930 Jacksonville State Eagle Owls football
- Conference: Independent
- Record: 4–3–1
- Head coach: J. W. Stephenson (2nd season)
- Home stadium: Daguette Field

1930 Southern college football independents records
| | Conf. | | | Overall |
| Team | W | L | T | W | | L | | T |
|---|---|---|---|---|---|---|---|---|
| Western Maryland | | – | | 9 | – | 0 | – | 1 |
| Texas Mines | | – | | 7 | – | 1 | – | 1 |
| Appalachian State | | – | | 8 | – | 2 | – | 1 |
| William & Mary Norfolk | | – | | 3 | – | 1 | – | 0 |
| Delaware | | – | | 6 | – | 3 | – | 1 |
| Furman | | – | | 6 | – | 3 | – | 1 |
| Delaware State | | – | | 4 | – | 2 | – | 0 |
| Wake Forest | | – | | 5 | – | 3 | – | 1 |
| Jacksonville State | | – | | 4 | – | 3 | – | 1 |
| Davidson | | – | | 6 | – | 4 | – | 0 |
| Navy | | – | | 6 | – | 5 | – | 0 |
| Middle Tennessee State Teachers | | – | | 5 | – | 5 | – | 1 |
| West Virginia | | – | | 5 | – | 5 | – | 0 |
| George Washington | | – | | 4 | – | 4 | – | 1 |
| Oglethorpe | | – | | 4 | – | 4 | – | 1 |
| Georgetown | | – | | 5 | – | 5 | – | 0 |
| South Georgia Teachers | | – | | 3 | – | 4 | – | 2 |
| Mississippi State Teachers | | – | | 3 | – | 5 | – | 1 |
| Texas Tech | | – | | 3 | – | 6 | – | 0 |
| Troy State | | – | | 1 | – | 2 | – | 0 |
| Jefferson (TX) | | – | | 1 | – | 3 | – | 0 |
| Beacom College | | – | | 1 | – | 5 | – | 1 |
| Catholic University | | – | | 1 | – | 8 | – | 0 |

The 1930 Jacksonville State Eagle Owls football team represented Jacksonville State Teachers College (now known as Jacksonville State University) as an independent during the 1930 college football season. Led by second-year head coach J. W. Stephenson, the Eagle Owls compiled an overall record of 4–3–1.

== Schedule ==
| Date | Opponent | Site | Result | Source |
|---|---|---|---|---|
| September 20 | at Sewanee | Hardee Field; Sewanee, TN | L 0–25 | |
| October 3 | vs. Howard (AL) | Johnston Field; Anniston, AL (rivalry) | L 0–20 | |
| October 11 | at Middle Tennessee State Teachers | Murfreesboro, TN | L 0–19 | |
| October 17 | at Bowdon College | Bowdon, GA | T 0–0 | |
| October 25 | at Piedmont | Demorest, GA | W 13–6 | |
| November 1 | Marion | Daguette Field; Jacksonville, AL | W 26–0 | |
| November 8 | Middle Georgia | Daguette Field; Jacksonville, AL | W 28–6 | |
| November 22 | Tennessee Wesleyan | Daguette Field; Jacksonville, AL | W 25–13 | |
