= 1930 Wake Forest Demon Deacons football team =

American college football season

1930 Wake Forest Demon Deacons football
- Conference: Independent
- Record: 5–3–1
- Head coach: Pat Miller (2nd season)
- Captain: Jack Parker
- Home stadium: Gore Field

1930 Southern college football independents records
	Conf.			Overall
Team	W	L	T	W		L		T
Western Maryland		–		9	–	0	–	1
Texas Mines		–		7	–	1	–	1
Appalachian State		–		8	–	2	–	1
William & Mary Norfolk		–		3	–	1	–	0
Delaware		–		6	–	3	–	1
Furman		–		6	–	3	–	1
Delaware State		–		4	–	2	–	0
Wake Forest		–		5	–	3	–	1
Jacksonville State		–		4	–	3	–	1
Davidson		–		6	–	4	–	0
Navy		–		6	–	5	–	0
Middle Tennessee State Teachers		–		5	–	5	–	1
West Virginia		–		5	–	5	–	0
George Washington		–		4	–	4	–	1
Oglethorpe		–		4	–	4	–	1
Georgetown		–		5	–	5	–	0
South Georgia Teachers		–		3	–	4	–	2
Mississippi State Teachers		–		3	–	5	–	1
Texas Tech		–		3	–	6	–	0
Troy State		–		1	–	2	–	0
Jefferson (TX)		–		1	–	3	–	0
Beacom College		–		1	–	5	–	1
Catholic University		–		1	–	8	–	0

The 1930 Wake Forest Demon Deacons football team was an American football team that represented Wake Forest College (now known as Wake Forest University) during the 1930 college football season. In its second season under head coach Pat Miller, the team compiled a 5–3–1 record.

== Schedule ==
Date	Time	Opponent	Site	Result	Attendance	Source
September 27		at North Carolina	Kenan Memorial Stadium; Chapel Hill, NC (rivalry)	L 7–13	9,000	
October 4		Guilford	Gore Field; Wake Forest, NC	W 20–0		
October 10		Baltimore	Gore Field; Wake Forest, NC	W 44–0	1,000	
October 16		at NC State	Riddick Stadium; Raleigh, NC (rivalry)	W 7–0		
October 25		vs. Mercer	Bellamy Field; Wilmington, NC	W 21–0		
October 31		at Temple	Temple Stadium; Philadelphia, PA	L 0–36	9,000	
November 8		vs. Presbyterian	Memorial Stadium; Asheville, NC	L 0–13	3,000	
November 22		Duke	Gore Field; Wake Forest, NC (rivalry)	T 13–13	5,000	
November 27	2:30 p.m.	vs. Davidson	Central High Field; Charlotte, NC	W 13–2	9,000	
All times are in Eastern time
