= 1930 William & Mary Norfolk Division Braves football team =

American college football season

1930 William & Mary Norfolk Division Braves football
- Conference: Independent
- Record: 3–1
- Head coach: Tommy Scott (1st season)
- Home stadium: League Park

1930 Southern college football independents records
| | Conf. | | | Overall |
| Team | W | L | T | W | | L | | T |
|---|---|---|---|---|---|---|---|---|
| Western Maryland | | – | | 9 | – | 0 | – | 1 |
| Texas Mines | | – | | 7 | – | 1 | – | 1 |
| Appalachian State | | – | | 8 | – | 2 | – | 1 |
| William & Mary Norfolk | | – | | 3 | – | 1 | – | 0 |
| Delaware | | – | | 6 | – | 3 | – | 1 |
| Furman | | – | | 6 | – | 3 | – | 1 |
| Delaware State | | – | | 4 | – | 2 | – | 0 |
| Wake Forest | | – | | 5 | – | 3 | – | 1 |
| Jacksonville State | | – | | 4 | – | 3 | – | 1 |
| Davidson | | – | | 6 | – | 4 | – | 0 |
| Navy | | – | | 6 | – | 5 | – | 0 |
| Middle Tennessee State Teachers | | – | | 5 | – | 5 | – | 1 |
| West Virginia | | – | | 5 | – | 5 | – | 0 |
| George Washington | | – | | 4 | – | 4 | – | 1 |
| Oglethorpe | | – | | 4 | – | 4 | – | 1 |
| Georgetown | | – | | 5 | – | 5 | – | 0 |
| South Georgia Teachers | | – | | 3 | – | 4 | – | 2 |
| Mississippi State Teachers | | – | | 3 | – | 5 | – | 1 |
| Texas Tech | | – | | 3 | – | 6 | – | 0 |
| Troy State | | – | | 1 | – | 2 | – | 0 |
| Jefferson (TX) | | – | | 1 | – | 3 | – | 0 |
| Beacom College | | – | | 1 | – | 5 | – | 1 |
| Catholic University | | – | | 1 | – | 8 | – | 0 |

The 1930 William & Mary Norfolk Division Braves football team represented the Norfolk Division of the College of William & Mary, now referred to as Old Dominion University, during the 1930 college football season. They finished with a 3–1 record.

== Schedule ==
| Date | Opponent | Site | Result | Source |
|---|---|---|---|---|
| September 26 | at Suffolk High School (VA) | Suffolk H.S. Stadium; Suffolk, VA | L 0–7 | |
| October 3 | Richmond Oceana High School (VA) | League Park; Norfolk, VA | W 47–0 | |
| October 15 | at William & Mary freshmen | Cary Field; Williamsburg, VA | W 13–7 | |
| October 24 | Perquimans High School (NC) | League Park; Norfolk, VA | W 24–7 | |
