= A. L. Swanson =

American sports coach (1905–1987)

Biographical details
- Born: April 19, 1905; Louisiana, U.S.
- Died: November 4, 1987 (aged 82); Farmerville, Louisiana, U.S.

Playing career

Football
- 1923–1925: LSU
- Positions: Guard, fullback, tackle

Coaching career (HC unless noted)

Football
- 1930: LSU (freshmen)
- 1931–1937: Southeastern Louisiana
- 1938: LSU (freshmen)
- 1947: LSU (line)
- 1948: LSU (freshmen)
- 1950: Southwestern Louisiana

Basketball
- 1944–1945: LSU

Baseball
- 1943–1945: LSU

Head coaching record
- Overall: 46–21–4 (football); 4–2 (basketball); 28–23 (baseball)

Accomplishments and honors

Championships
- Baseball; 1 SEC (1943)

Awards
- Baseball; SEC Coach of the Year (1943)

Arthur Leonard "Red" Swanson Sr. (April 19, 1905 – November 4, 1987) was an American football, basketball, and baseball coach. He served as the head football coach at Southeastern Louisiana College—now known as Southeastern Louisiana University—from 1931 to 1937 and at Southwestern Louisiana Institute of Liberal and Technical Learning—now known as the University of Louisiana at Lafayette—in 1950, compiling a career college football coaching record of 46–21–4.

From 1943 to 1945 he served as head coach of the LSU Tigers baseball team. His record as LSU's baseball coach was 28–23 and led the 1943 team to a Southeastern Conference (SEC) championship. During the 1944–45 LSU Tigers basketball season, he served as head coach for the final six games, compiling a 4–2 record.

Swanson's son, also nicknamed Red Swanson, was a pitcher for the Pittsburgh Pirates of Major League Baseball from 1955 to 1957. The elder Swanson was married to Billie Hightower and died in 1987.

== Head coaching record ==
=== Football ===
Year	Team	Overall	Conference	Standing	Bowl/playoffs
Southeastern Louisiana Lions (Independent) (1931–1937)
1931	Southeastern Louisiana	2–2–2			
1932	Southeastern Louisiana	3–5			
1933	Southeastern Louisiana	7–3			
1934	Southeastern Louisiana	7–3			
1935	Southeastern Louisiana	7–2			
1936	Southeastern Louisiana	7–0–1			
1937	Southeastern Louisiana	8–2–1			
Southeastern Louisiana:		41–17–4			
Southwestern Louisiana Bulldogs (Gulf States Conference) (1950)
1950	Southwestern Louisiana	5–4	2–3	T–4th	
Southwestern Louisiana:		5–4	2–3		
Total:		46–21–4			

=== Basketball ===
Record table
Season	Team	Overall	Conference	Standing	Postseason
LSU Tigers (Southeastern Conference) (1944–1945)
1944–45	LSU	4–2	0–1		
LSU:		4–2 (.667)	0–1 (.000)		
Total:		4–2 (.667)			

=== Baseball ===
Record table
Season	Team	Overall	Conference	Standing	Postseason
LSU Tigers (Southeastern Conference) (1943–1945)
1943	LSU	13–8	11–3	1st	
1944	LSU	4–8			
1945	LSU	11–7			
LSU:		28–23–0 (.549)	11–3 (.786)		
Total:		28–23–0 (.549)			
National champion Postseason invitational champion Conference regular season champion Conference regular season and conference tournament champion Division regular season champion Division regular season and conference tournament champion Conference tournament champion
