= 1930 Georgetown Hoyas football team =

American college football season

1930 Georgetown Hoyas football
- Conference: Independent
- Record: 5–5
- Head coach: Tommy Mills (1st season)
- Captain: Bill Morris
- Home stadium: Griffith Stadium

1930 Southern college football independents records
	Conf.			Overall
Team	W	L	T	W		L		T
Western Maryland		–		9	–	0	–	1
Texas Mines		–		7	–	1	–	1
Appalachian State		–		8	–	2	–	1
William & Mary Norfolk		–		3	–	1	–	0
Delaware		–		6	–	3	–	1
Furman		–		6	–	3	–	1
Delaware State		–		4	–	2	–	0
Wake Forest		–		5	–	3	–	1
Jacksonville State		–		4	–	3	–	1
Davidson		–		6	–	4	–	0
Navy		–		6	–	5	–	0
Middle Tennessee State Teachers		–		5	–	5	–	1
West Virginia		–		5	–	5	–	0
George Washington		–		4	–	4	–	1
Oglethorpe		–		4	–	4	–	1
Georgetown		–		5	–	5	–	0
South Georgia Teachers		–		3	–	4	–	2
Mississippi State Teachers		–		3	–	5	–	1
Texas Tech		–		3	–	6	–	0
Troy State		–		1	–	2	–	0
Jefferson (TX)		–		1	–	3	–	0
Beacom College		–		1	–	5	–	1
Catholic University		–		1	–	8	–	0

The 1930 Georgetown Hoyas football team represented Georgetown University as an independent during the 1930 college football season. Led by Tommy Mills in his first season as head coach, the team went 5–5.

== Schedule ==
Date	Opponent	Site	Result	Attendance	Source
September 27	Mount St. Mary's	Griffith Stadium; Washington, DC	W 14–6		
October 4	at Loyola (IL)	Loyola Stadium; Chicago, IL	W 16–6	10,000	
October 10	West Virginia Wesleyan	Griffith Stadium; Washington, DC	W 67–12	20,000	
October 18	vs. Western Maryland	Memorial Stadium; Baltimore, MD	L 0–10	18,000	
October 24	West Virginia	Griffith Stadium; Washington, DC	L 7–14	10,000	
October 31	Michigan State	Griffith Stadium; Washington, DC	W 14–13		
November 8	at Boston College	Fenway Park; Boston, MA	W 20–19		
November 15	at NYU	Yankee Stadium; Bronx, NY	L 0–2	20,000	
November 22	at Villanova	Shibe Park; Philadelphia, PA	L 0–13		
November 29	at Detroit	University of Detroit Stadium; Detroit, MI	L 0–12		
