= 1930 Davidson Wildcats football team =

American college football season

1930 Davidson Wildcats football
- Conference: Independent
- Record: 6–4
- Head coach: William L. Younger (8th season)
- Home stadium: Richardson Field

1930 Southern college football independents records
	Conf.			Overall
Team	W	L	T	W		L		T
Western Maryland		–		9	–	0	–	1
Texas Mines		–		7	–	1	–	1
Appalachian State		–		8	–	2	–	1
William & Mary Norfolk		–		3	–	1	–	0
Delaware		–		6	–	3	–	1
Furman		–		6	–	3	–	1
Delaware State		–		4	–	2	–	0
Wake Forest		–		5	–	3	–	1
Jacksonville State		–		4	–	3	–	1
Davidson		–		6	–	4	–	0
Navy		–		6	–	5	–	0
Middle Tennessee State Teachers		–		5	–	5	–	1
West Virginia		–		5	–	5	–	0
George Washington		–		4	–	4	–	1
Oglethorpe		–		4	–	4	–	1
Georgetown		–		5	–	5	–	0
South Georgia Teachers		–		3	–	4	–	2
Mississippi State Teachers		–		3	–	5	–	1
Texas Tech		–		3	–	6	–	0
Troy State		–		1	–	2	–	0
Jefferson (TX)		–		1	–	3	–	0
Beacom College		–		1	–	5	–	1
Catholic University		–		1	–	8	–	0

The 1930 Davidson Wildcats football team represented Davidson College as an independent during the 1930 college football season. Led by eighth-year head coach William L. Younger, the Wildcats compiled an overall record of 6–4.

== Schedule ==
Date	Time	Opponent	Site	Result	Attendance	Source
September 20		Elon	Richardson Field; Davidson, NC	W 38–0		
September 27		vs. NC State	World War Memorial Stadium; Greensboro, NC	W 12–0		
October 4		Erskine	Richardson Field; Davidson, NC	W 21–0		
October 11		at Duke	Duke Stadium; Durham, NC	L 0–12		
October 18		vs. The Citadel	Central High School Stadium; Charlotte, NC	W 6–0		
October 25		VPI^{†}	Richardson Field; Davidson, NC	L 19–20		
November 1		at VMI	Alumni Field; Lexington, VA	L 0–6		
November 8		Wofford	Richardson Field; Davidson, NC	W 13–0		
November 15		North Carolina	Richardson Field; Davidson, NC	W 7–6		
November 27	2:30 p.m.	vs. Wake Forest	Central High School Stadium; Charlotte, NC	L 2–13	9,000	
^{†}Homecoming; All times are in Eastern time
