= 1932 William & Mary Norfolk Division Braves football team =

American college football season

1932 William & Mary Norfolk Division Braves football
- Conference: Independent
- Record: 6–3–1
- Head coach: Tommy Scott (3rd season)
- Home stadium: Bain Field

1932 Southern college football independents records
| | Conf. | | | Overall |
| Team | W | L | T | W | | L | | T |
|---|---|---|---|---|---|---|---|---|
| Jefferson (TX) | | – | | 8 | – | 0 | – | 0 |
| Catholic University | | – | | 6 | – | 1 | – | 1 |
| South Georgia Teachers | | – | | 6 | – | 2 | – | 0 |
| Western Maryland | | – | | 5 | – | 1 | – | 2 |
| George Washington | | – | | 6 | – | 2 | – | 1 |
| Texas Mines | | – | | 7 | – | 3 | – | 0 |
| William & Mary Norfolk | | – | | 6 | – | 3 | – | 1 |
| Troy State | | – | | 5 | – | 3 | – | 2 |
| Delaware | | – | | 5 | – | 4 | – | 0 |
| Wake Forest | | – | | 3 | – | 3 | – | 2 |
| West Virginia | | – | | 5 | – | 5 | – | 0 |
| Georgetown | | – | | 2 | – | 6 | – | 1 |
| Navy | | – | | 2 | – | 6 | – | 1 |
| Oglethorpe | | – | | 1 | – | 6 | – | 0 |
| East Carolina | | – | | 0 | – | 5 | – | 0 |

The 1932 William & Mary Norfolk Division Braves football team represented the Norfolk Division of the College of William & Mary, now referred to as Old Dominion University, during the 1932 college football season. They finished with a 6–3–1 record, and outscored their opponents 133–31.

== Schedule ==
| Date | Time | Opponent | Site | Result | Attendance | Source |
|---|---|---|---|---|---|---|
| September 17 | 3:00 p.m. | South Norfolk High School (VA) | Norfolk, VA | W 18–0 | | |
| September 23 | | at Woodrow Wilson High School | Washington Street Park; Portsmouth, VA | W 26–0 | | |
| September 30 | 3:00 p.m. | William & Mary freshmen | Bain Field; Norfolk, VA | W 13–0 | | |
| October 7 | | at Wake Forest freshmen | Wake Forest, NC | L 0–6 | | |
| October 14 | | at Miami (FL) | Moore Park; Miami, FL | L 2–6 | 10,000 | |
| October 22 | | vs. Shenandoah | Harrisonburg High Field; Harrisonburg, VA | W 26–12 | | |
| October 29 | 3:00 p.m. | VPI freshmen | Bain Field; Norfolk, VA | W 13–0 | 2,500 | |
| November 4 | | at Louisburg | Louisburg, NC | W 29–0 | | |
| November 11 | | Davidson freshmen | Bain Field; Norfolk, VA | T 0–0 | | |
| November 19 | | at Campbell | Buies Creek, NC | L 0–7 | | |
All times are in Eastern time
