= 1932 Wake Forest Demon Deacons football team =

American college football season

1932 Wake Forest Demon Deacons football
- Conference: Independent
- Record: 3–3–2
- Head coach: Pat Miller (4th season)
- Captain: Bill Green
- Home stadium: Gore Field

1932 Southern college football independents records
	Conf.			Overall
Team	W	L	T	W		L		T
Jefferson (TX)		–		8	–	0	–	0
Catholic University		–		6	–	1	–	1
South Georgia Teachers		–		6	–	2	–	0
Western Maryland		–		5	–	1	–	2
George Washington		–		6	–	2	–	1
Texas Mines		–		7	–	3	–	0
William & Mary Norfolk		–		6	–	3	–	1
Troy State		–		5	–	3	–	2
Delaware		–		5	–	4	–	0
Wake Forest		–		3	–	3	–	2
West Virginia		–		5	–	5	–	0
Georgetown		–		2	–	6	–	1
Navy		–		2	–	6	–	1
Oglethorpe		–		1	–	6	–	0
East Carolina		–		0	–	5	–	0

The 1932 Wake Forest Demon Deacons football team was an American football team that represented Wake Forest College (now known as Wake Forest University) during the 1932 college football season. In its fourth season under head coach Pat Miller, the team compiled a 3–3–2 record.

== Schedule ==
Date	Opponent	Site	Result	Attendance	Source
September 24	at North Carolina	Kenan Memorial Stadium; Chapel Hill, NC (rivalry)	T 0–0	7,000	
October 8	vs. South Carolina	Central High School Stadium; Charlotte, NC	W 6–0	6,000	
October 15	at NC State	Riddick Stadium; Raleigh, NC (rivalry)	T 0–0	11,000	
October 21	at Duke	Duke Stadium; Durham, NC (rivalry)	L 0–9		
October 29	at Delaware	Frazer Field; Newark, DE	W 7–0		
November 5	at Catholic University	Brookland Stadium; Washington, DC	L 6–14		
November 11	Carson–Newman	Gore Field; Wake Forest, NC	W 20–6		
November 24	at Davidson	Richardson Field; Davidson, NC	L 0–7		
