= 1932 Troy State Red Wave football team =

American college football season

1932 Troy State Red Wave football
- Conference: Independent
- Record: 5–3–2
- Head coach: Albert Elmore (2nd season)
- Home stadium: Pace Field

1932 Southern college football independents records
	Conf.			Overall
Team	W	L	T	W		L		T
Jefferson (TX)		–		8	–	0	–	0
Catholic University		–		6	–	1	–	1
South Georgia Teachers		–		6	–	2	–	0
Western Maryland		–		5	–	1	–	2
George Washington		–		6	–	2	–	1
Texas Mines		–		7	–	3	–	0
William & Mary Norfolk		–		6	–	3	–	1
Troy State		–		5	–	3	–	2
Delaware		–		5	–	4	–	0
Wake Forest		–		3	–	3	–	2
West Virginia		–		5	–	5	–	0
Georgetown		–		2	–	6	–	1
Navy		–		2	–	6	–	1
Oglethorpe		–		1	–	6	–	0
East Carolina		–		0	–	5	–	0

The 1932 Troy State Red Wave football team represented Troy State Teachers College (now known as Troy University) as an independent during the 1932 college football season. Led by second-year head coach Albert Elmore, the Red Wave compiled an overall record of 5–3–2.

== Schedule ==
Date	Opponent	Site	Result	Source
September 24	Southern Union Junior College	Pace Field; Troy, AL	W 62–0	
October 1	at Middle Georgia	Cochran, GA	L 6–7	
October 8	at Georgia State College	Tifton, GA	L 0–19	
October 15	Norman Park Junior College	Pace Field; Troy, AL	T 13–13	
October 21	at Marion	Johnson Field; Marion, AL	T 0–0	
October 28	Howard (AL) freshmen	Pace Field; Troy, AL	W 15–6	
November 5	at East Mississippi	Scooba, MS	W 9–7	
November 11	Jacksonville State	Pace Field; Troy, AL (rivalry)	W 20–0	
November 18	Auburn freshmen	Pace Field; Troy, AL	W 6–0	
November 25	South Georgia State	Pace Field; Troy, AL	L 0–17	
