= 1932 West Virginia Mountaineers football team =

American college football season

1932 West Virginia Mountaineers football
- Conference: Independent
- Record: 5–5
- Head coach: Greasy Neale (2nd season)
- Captain: John Doyle
- Home stadium: Mountaineer Field

1932 Southern college football independents records
	Conf.			Overall
Team	W	L	T	W		L		T
Jefferson (TX)		–		8	–	0	–	0
Catholic University		–		6	–	1	–	1
South Georgia Teachers		–		6	–	2	–	0
Western Maryland		–		5	–	1	–	2
George Washington		–		6	–	2	–	1
Texas Mines		–		7	–	3	–	0
William & Mary Norfolk		–		6	–	3	–	1
Troy State		–		5	–	3	–	2
Delaware		–		5	–	4	–	0
Wake Forest		–		3	–	3	–	2
West Virginia		–		5	–	5	–	0
Georgetown		–		2	–	6	–	1
Navy		–		2	–	6	–	1
Oglethorpe		–		1	–	6	–	0
East Carolina		–		0	–	5	–	0

The 1932 West Virginia Mountaineers football team was an American football team that represented West Virginia University as an independent during the 1932 college football season. In its second season under head coach Greasy Neale, the team compiled a 5–5 record and outscored opponents by a total of 137 to 115. The team played its home games at Mountaineer Field in Morgantown, West Virginia. Fred Schweitzer was the team captain.

== Schedule ==
Date	Opponent	Site	Result	Attendance	Source
September 23	at Duquesne	Forbes Field; Pittsburgh, PA	L 0–3	30,000	
October 1	Pittsburgh	Mountaineer Field; Morgantown, WV (rivalry)	L 0–40	15,000	
October 7	at Temple	Temple Stadium; Philadelphia, PA	L 13–14	10,000	
October 15	West Virginia Wesleyan	Mountaineer Field; Morgantown, WV	W 14–0	5,000	
October 21	at Detroit	University of Detroit Stadium; Detroit, MI	L 13–26		
October 29	at Marquette	Marquette Stadium; Milwaukee, WI	W 34–7		
November 5	Georgetown	Mountaineer Field; Morgantown, WV	W 19–0	10,000	
November 12	vs. Washington and Lee	Laidley Field; Charleston, WV	W 19–0		
November 19	Davis & Elkins	Mountaineer Field; Morgantown, WV	W 25–12		
November 26	vs. Washington & Jefferson	Wheeling, WV	L 0–13	7,500	
