= 1932 Delaware Fightin' Blue Hens football team =

American college football season

1932 Delaware Fightin' Blue Hens football
- Conference: Independent
- Record: 5–4
- Head coach: Charles Rogers (2nd season)
- Home stadium: Frazer Field

1932 Southern college football independents records
	Conf.			Overall
Team	W	L	T	W		L		T
Jefferson (TX)		–		8	–	0	–	0
Catholic University		–		6	–	1	–	1
South Georgia Teachers		–		6	–	2	–	0
Western Maryland		–		5	–	1	–	2
George Washington		–		6	–	2	–	1
Texas Mines		–		7	–	3	–	0
William & Mary Norfolk		–		6	–	3	–	1
Troy State		–		5	–	3	–	2
Delaware		–		5	–	4	–	0
Wake Forest		–		3	–	3	–	2
West Virginia		–		5	–	5	–	0
Georgetown		–		2	–	6	–	1
Navy		–		2	–	6	–	1
Oglethorpe		–		1	–	6	–	0
East Carolina		–		0	–	5	–	0

The 1932 Delaware Fightin' Blue Hens football team was an American football team that represented the University of Delaware in the 1932 college football season. In their second season under head coach Charles Rogers, the Blue Hens compiled a 5–4 record and were outscored by a total of 77 to 55. The team played its home games at Frazer Field in Newark, Delaware.

== Schedule ==
Date	Opponent	Site	Result	Attendance	Source
October 1	La Salle	Frazer Field; Newark, DE	W 11–6	4,000	
October 8	Drexel	Frazer Field; Newark, DE	L 10–13		
October 15	at Rutgers	Neilson Field; New Brunswick, NJ	L 0–32		
October 22	Springfield	Frazer Field; Newark, DE	L 6–13		
October 29	Wake Forest	Frazer Field; Newark, DE	L 0–7		
November 5	Saint Joseph's	Frazer Field; Newark, DE	W 7–0		
November 11	vs. Pennsylvania Military	Municipal Auditorium; Atlantic City, NJ	W 7–6	15,000	
November 19	Haverford	Frazer Field; Newark, DE	W 6–0		
November 26	at Washington College	Chestertown, MD	W 8–0		
