= 1932 East Carolina Teachers football team =

American college football season

1932 East Carolina Teachers football
- Conference: Independent
- Record: 0–5
- Head coach: Kenneth Beatty (1st season)

1932 Southern college football independents records
	Conf.			Overall
Team	W	L	T	W		L		T
Jefferson (TX)		–		8	–	0	–	0
Catholic University		–		6	–	1	–	1
South Georgia Teachers		–		6	–	2	–	0
Western Maryland		–		5	–	1	–	2
George Washington		–		6	–	2	–	1
Texas Mines		–		7	–	3	–	0
William & Mary Norfolk		–		6	–	3	–	1
Troy State		–		5	–	3	–	2
Delaware		–		5	–	4	–	0
Wake Forest		–		3	–	3	–	2
West Virginia		–		5	–	5	–	0
Georgetown		–		2	–	6	–	1
Navy		–		2	–	6	–	1
Oglethorpe		–		1	–	6	–	0
East Carolina		–		0	–	5	–	0

The 1932 East Carolina Teachers football team was an American football team that represented East Carolina Teachers College—now known as East Carolina University—as an independent during the 1932 college football season. In their first season under head coach Kenneth Beatty, the team compiled a 0–5 record.

== Schedule ==
Date	Opponent	Site	Result	Source
October 29	at Presbyterian Junior College	Maxton, NC	L 0–32	
November 5	Wake Forest freshmen	Greenville, NC	L 0–20	
November 12	at Guilford	Greensboro, NC	L 0–79	
November 19	NC State freshmen	Greenville, NC	L 0–40	
November 26	Appalachian State	Greenville, NC	L 0–21	
