= 1932 Georgetown Hoyas football team =

American college football season

1932 Georgetown Hoyas football
- Conference: Independent
- Record: 2–6–1
- Head coach: Tommy Mills (3rd season; first 5 games); Jack Hagerty (1st season, final 4 games)
- Captain: Ray Hudson
- Home stadium: Griffith Stadium

1932 Southern college football independents records
	Conf.			Overall
Team	W	L	T	W		L		T
Jefferson (TX)		–		8	–	0	–	0
Catholic University		–		6	–	1	–	1
South Georgia Teachers		–		6	–	2	–	0
Western Maryland		–		5	–	1	–	2
George Washington		–		6	–	2	–	1
Texas Mines		–		7	–	3	–	0
William & Mary Norfolk		–		6	–	3	–	1
Troy State		–		5	–	3	–	2
Delaware		–		5	–	4	–	0
Wake Forest		–		3	–	3	–	2
West Virginia		–		5	–	5	–	0
Georgetown		–		2	–	6	–	1
Navy		–		2	–	6	–	1
Oglethorpe		–		1	–	6	–	0
East Carolina		–		0	–	5	–	0

The 1932 Georgetown Hoyas football team represented Georgetown University as an independent during the 1932 college football season. The team began the season under third-year head coach Tommy Mills, who resigned after five games. He was replaced by Jack Hagerty, who guided the Hoyas for the final four games of the season. Georgetown finished the year with an overall record of 2–6–1.

== Schedule ==
Date	Time	Opponent	Site	Result	Attendance	Source
October 1		Mount St. Mary's	Griffith Stadium; Washington, DC	W 26–0		
October 9		at Canisius	Buffalo, NY	W 14–6		
October 15		at NYU	Yankee Stadium; Bronx, NY	L 0–39	30,000	
October 22		Western Maryland	Griffith Stadium; Washington, DC	L 6–12	5,000	
October 28		at Detroit	University of Detroit Stadium; Detroit, MI	L 0–13		
November 5		at West Virginia	Mountaineer Field; Morgantown, WV	L 0–19	10,000	
November 12	2:00 p.m.	West Virginia Wesleyan	Griffith Stadium; Washington, DC	L 0–14	5,000	
November 19		Bucknell	Griffith Stadium; Washington, DC	T 6–6		
December 3	2:00 p.m.	Carnegie Tech	Griffith Stadium; Washington, DC	L 0–51	8,000	
All times are in Eastern time
