= 1932 Jefferson Rangers football team =

American college football season

1932 Jefferson Rangers football
- Conference: Independent
- Record: 8–0
- Head coach: Nick Dobbs (1st season)
- Offensive scheme: Notre Dame
- Captain: Jim Hamrick
- Home stadium: Fair Park Stadium

1932 Southern college football independents records
| | Conf. | | | Overall |
| Team | W | L | T | W | | L | | T |
|---|---|---|---|---|---|---|---|---|
| Jefferson (TX) | | – | | 8 | – | 0 | – | 0 |
| Catholic University | | – | | 6 | – | 1 | – | 1 |
| South Georgia Teachers | | – | | 6 | – | 2 | – | 0 |
| Western Maryland | | – | | 5 | – | 1 | – | 2 |
| George Washington | | – | | 6 | – | 2 | – | 1 |
| Texas Mines | | – | | 7 | – | 3 | – | 0 |
| William & Mary Norfolk | | – | | 6 | – | 3 | – | 1 |
| Troy State | | – | | 5 | – | 3 | – | 2 |
| Delaware | | – | | 5 | – | 4 | – | 0 |
| Wake Forest | | – | | 3 | – | 3 | – | 2 |
| West Virginia | | – | | 5 | – | 5 | – | 0 |
| Georgetown | | – | | 2 | – | 6 | – | 1 |
| Navy | | – | | 2 | – | 6 | – | 1 |
| Oglethorpe | | – | | 1 | – | 6 | – | 0 |
| East Carolina | | – | | 0 | – | 5 | – | 0 |

The 1932 Jefferson Rangers football team was an American football team that represented Jefferson University in Texas (formerly known as Jefferson Law School) during the 1932 college football season. During the offseason of 1932, Jefferson hired Nick Dobbs from local Highland Park High School as its new head coach. Jim Hamrick was the team captain and the team played its home games mostly at Fair Park Stadium in Dallas.

Scouring the country Dobbs brought some of the best players in the country to create a competitive team, playing mostly smaller and medium colleges in the southwestern U.S. Known as the Bobcats in 1931, Dobbs re-branded them as the Rangers for the 1932 season.

In its third season of intercollegiate football, Jefferson compiled an 8–0 record, including a stunning victory over Oklahoma A&M, 12–6, at the Fair Park Stadium in Dallas. Coaches from other schools were suspicious of the sudden transformation of the Jefferson team from one that just two years earlier had lost to a private boys prep school, but now had beaten Oklahoma A&M, as well as other strong, smaller-college teams such as Oklahoma City and Phillips. Texas and SMU cancelled games for their freshmen teams against Jefferson, and other schools chose to avoid playing them because of concerns that the Rangers were a semi-pro team, and since Jefferson did not belong to a conference, there was no institutional oversight to ensure the eligibility of players.

In early December 1932, Andrew Priest, the founder and president of Jefferson declared that the team was being ejected from the university for the eligibility issues and the failure of most of the players to attend classes. Undeterred, Dobbs declared the Rangers a free-agent football team and re-branded them as the "Dallas Rangers". Seeking a challenge match, he secured one against the runners-up of the National Football League (NFL), the Portsmouth Spartans (now known as the Detroit Lions), to be played, as part of a barnstorming tour by the Spartans, on New Year's Day, 1933.

After a warm-up game in Texarkana, Texas against Texarkana Junior College, a 44–14 win, the Rangers played the Spartans in the Fair Park Stadium on January 1, losing 21–0. Six weeks later, Dobbs took his team to the executives who ran Somerville Law School in Dallas, and created an entirely new college called Dixie University, centered around the football team, and again re-branded his team, this time as the Dixie Rebels, putting together an 11-game college football slate for the 1933 fall season.

Jefferson was opened in 1919 as a law school by Andrew J. Priest in downtown Dallas. One of its early faculty members was Judge Sarah T. Hughes. The school achieved some success training lawyers and had a high graduation rate and most students successfully passed the bar exam. Jefferson was re-branded as Jefferson University in 1931 as it added additional colleges such as engineering, liberal arts, business, commerce, and secretarial training.

1932 Ranger Jodie Whire later played for the Philadelphia Eagles of the National Football League.

== Schedule ==
| Date | Time | Opponent | Site | Result | Attendance | Source |
|---|---|---|---|---|---|---|
| September 16 | | Southeastern Oklahoma State | Fair Park Stadium; Dallas, TX | W 13–0 | 6,000 | |
| September 23 | 8:00 p.m. | Oklahoma City | Fair Park Stadium; Dallas, TX | W 20–12 | 5,000 | |
| September 29 | | Simmons (TX) | Fair Park Stadium; Dallas, TX | W 20–0 | 3,000 | |
| October 7 | | Weatherford | Highland Park Stadium; University Park, TX | W 39–6 | 2,000 | |
| October 11 | | Kelly Field | Fair Park Stadium; Dallas, TX | W 37–6 | 5,000 | |
| October 28 | | at Central State Teachers | Edmond, OK | W 13–6 | 5,000 | |
| November 11 | | Oklahoma A&M | Fair Park Stadium; Dallas, TX | W 12–6 | 4,500 | |
| November 17 | | Phillips | Fair Park Stadium; Dallas, TX | W 26–6 | 500 | |
All times are in Central time
