= 1932 Catholic University Cardinals football team =

American college football season

1932 Catholic University Cardinals football
- Conference: Independent
- Record: 6–1–1
- Head coach: Dutch Bergman (3rd season)
- Captain: Buster Sheary
- Home stadium: Brookland Stadium, Griffith Stadium

1932 Southern college football independents records
	Conf.			Overall
Team	W	L	T	W		L		T
Jefferson (TX)		–		8	–	0	–	0
Catholic University		–		6	–	1	–	1
South Georgia Teachers		–		6	–	2	–	0
Western Maryland		–		5	–	1	–	2
George Washington		–		6	–	2	–	1
Texas Mines		–		7	–	3	–	0
William & Mary Norfolk		–		6	–	3	–	1
Troy State		–		5	–	3	–	2
Delaware		–		5	–	4	–	0
Wake Forest		–		3	–	3	–	2
West Virginia		–		5	–	5	–	0
Georgetown		–		2	–	6	–	1
Navy		–		2	–	6	–	1
Oglethorpe		–		1	–	6	–	0
East Carolina		–		0	–	5	–	0

The 1932 Catholic University Cardinals football team was an American football team that represented the Catholic University of America as an independent during the 1932 college football season. In its third year under head coach Dutch Bergman, the team compiled a 6–1–1 record and outscored opponents by a total of 123 to 21. The team's sole loss was to Holy Cross.

== Schedule ==
Date	Time	Opponent	Site	Result	Attendance	Source
October 1		at CCNY	Lewisohn Stadium; New York, NY	W 47–0		
October 15		Chattanooga	Brookland Stadium; Washington, DC	W 19–0	10,000	
October 22		at Manhattan	Ebbets Field; Brooklyn, NY	W 12–7	20,000	
October 29	2:00 p.m.	Holy Cross	Fitton Field; Worcester, MA	L 0–8		
November 5		Wake Forest	Brookland Stadium; Washington, DC	W 14–6		
November 12		at Providence	Providence, RI	W 6–0		
November 18		Duquesne	Griffith Stadium; Washington, DC	T 0–0	8,000	
November 24		Loyola (MD)	Washington, DC	W 25–0		
All times are in Eastern time
