= 1932 Texas Mines Miners football team =

American college football season

1932 Texas Mines Miners football
- Conference: Independent
- Record: 7–3
- Head coach: Mack Saxon (4th season)
- Home stadium: El Paso High School Stadium

1932 Southern college football independents records
	Conf.			Overall
Team	W	L	T	W		L		T
Jefferson (TX)		–		8	–	0	–	0
Catholic University		–		6	–	1	–	1
South Georgia Teachers		–		6	–	2	–	0
Western Maryland		–		5	–	1	–	2
George Washington		–		6	–	2	–	1
Texas Mines		–		7	–	3	–	0
William & Mary Norfolk		–		6	–	3	–	1
Troy State		–		5	–	3	–	2
Delaware		–		5	–	4	–	0
Wake Forest		–		3	–	3	–	2
West Virginia		–		5	–	5	–	0
Georgetown		–		2	–	6	–	1
Navy		–		2	–	6	–	1
Oglethorpe		–		1	–	6	–	0
East Carolina		–		0	–	5	–	0

The 1932 Texas Mines Miners football team, sometimes referred to as the "Muckers", was an American football team that represented the Texas School of Mines (now known as the University of Texas at El Paso) as an independent during the 1932 college football season. In its fourth season under head coach Mack Saxon, the team compiled a 7–3 record and outscored opponents by a total of 207 to 115.

== Schedule ==
Date	Opponent	Site	Result	Attendance	Source
October 1	Wayland	El Paso High School Stadium; El Paso, TX	W 38–7	2,000	
October 8	Howard Payne	El Paso High School Stadium; El Paso, TX	W 19–7	2,500	
October 14	Simmons (TX)	El Paso High School Stadium; El Paso, TX	W 13–2	4,000–5,000	
October 22	at New Mexico Military	Roswell, NM	W 14–12		
October 29	at New Mexico A&M	Las Cruces, NM	W 31–6	2,500	
November 11	at Arizona State	Irish Field; Tempe, AZ	L 14–15		
November 16	at Fort Bliss	El Paso High School Stadium; El Paso, TX	W 59–6	400–500	
November 24	St. Edward's^{†}	El Paso High School Stadium; El Paso, TX	W 27–13	4,000	
November 28	Oklahoma A&M	El Paso High School Stadium; El Paso, TX	L 7–20		
January 2, 1933	SMU	El Paso High School Stadium; El Paso, TX	L 0–26	5,000	
^{†}Homecoming
