= 1932 Oglethorpe Stormy Petrels football team =

American college football season

1932 Oglethorpe Stormy Petrels football
- Conference: Independent
- Record: 1–6
- Head coach: Harry J. Robertson (9th season)
- Home stadium: Hermance Stadium; Ponce de Leon Park

1932 Southern college football independents records
	Conf.			Overall
Team	W	L	T	W		L		T
Jefferson (TX)		–		8	–	0	–	0
Catholic University		–		6	–	1	–	1
South Georgia Teachers		–		6	–	2	–	0
Western Maryland		–		5	–	1	–	2
George Washington		–		6	–	2	–	1
Texas Mines		–		7	–	3	–	0
William & Mary Norfolk		–		6	–	3	–	1
Troy State		–		5	–	3	–	2
Delaware		–		5	–	4	–	0
Wake Forest		–		3	–	3	–	2
West Virginia		–		5	–	5	–	0
Georgetown		–		2	–	6	–	1
Navy		–		2	–	6	–	1
Oglethorpe		–		1	–	6	–	0
East Carolina		–		0	–	5	–	0

The 1932 Oglethorpe Stormy Petrels football team was an American football team that represented Oglethorpe University as an independent during the 1932 college football season. In their ninth year under head coach Harry J. Robertson, the Stormy Petrels compiled a 1–6 record.

== Schedule ==
Date	Opponent	Site	Result	Attendance	Source
September 23	Howard (AL)	Ponce de Leon Park; Atlanta, GA	L 6–14	3,000	
October 7	at Xavier	Corcoran Stadium; Cincinnati, OH	W 7–0	5,300	
October 14	at Duquesne	Forbes Field; Pittsburgh, PA	L 6–21		
October 29	at Manhattan	Polo Grounds; New York, NY	L 7–20	15,000	
November 5	at Syracuse	Archbold Stadium; Syracuse, NY	L 6–27	15,000	
November 12	at Loyola (LA)	Loyola University Stadium; New Orleans, LA	L 0–20	6,000	
November 24	Mercer	Hermance Stadium; North Atlanta, GA	L 6–7		
