= 1932 Western Maryland Green Terror football team =

American college football season

1932 Western Maryland Green Terror football
- Conference: Independent
- Record: 5–1–2
- Head coach: Dick Harlow (7th season)
- Captain: Hal Kopp
- Home stadium: Hoffa Field

1932 Southern college football independents records
	Conf.			Overall
Team	W	L	T	W		L		T
Jefferson (TX)		–		8	–	0	–	0
Catholic University		–		6	–	1	–	1
South Georgia Teachers		–		6	–	2	–	0
Western Maryland		–		5	–	1	–	2
George Washington		–		6	–	2	–	1
Texas Mines		–		7	–	3	–	0
William & Mary Norfolk		–		6	–	3	–	1
Troy State		–		5	–	3	–	2
Delaware		–		5	–	4	–	0
Wake Forest		–		3	–	3	–	2
West Virginia		–		5	–	5	–	0
Georgetown		–		2	–	6	–	1
Navy		–		2	–	6	–	1
Oglethorpe		–		1	–	6	–	0
East Carolina		–		0	–	5	–	0

The 1932 Western Maryland Green Terror football team was an American football team that represented Western Maryland College (now known as McDaniel College) as an independent during the 1932 college football season. In its seventh season under head coach Dick Harlow, the team compiled a 5–1–2 record. Hal Kopp was the team's captain. Western Maryland played home games at Hoffa Field on Westminster, Maryland. Fullback Bill Shepherd was the team's offensive star.

Harlow served nine years as Western Maryland's head football coach. During those years, the school's football team compiled a 60–13–7 record. He was later inducted into the College Football Hall of Fame.

During the 1932 season, the team played its one home game at Hoffa Field in Westminster, Maryland.

== Schedule ==
Date	Opponent	Site	Result	Attendance	Source
October 1	at St. Thomas (PA)	Scranton, PA	W 12–6	3,000	
October 8	at Marshall	Fairfield Stadium; Huntington, WV	T 13–13		
October 15	Mount St. Mary's^{†}	Westminster, MD	W 33–6	2,000	
October 22	at Georgetown	Griffith Stadium; Washington, DC	W 12–6	5,000	
October 29	vs. Loyola (MD)	Baltimore Stadium; Baltimore, MD	W 28–6	7,500	
November 5	at Bucknell	Bucknell Stadium; Lewisburg, PA	L 13–14		
November 11	at Boston College	Alumni Field; Chestnut Hill, MA	T 20–20		
December 3	at Maryland	Byrd Stadium; College Park, MD	W 39–7	7,000	
^{†}Homecoming
