= 1932 South Georgia Teachers Blue Tide football team =

American college football season

1932 South Georgia Teachers Blue Tide football
- Conference: Independent
- Record: 6–2
- Head coach: Crook Smith (4th season)

1932 Southern college football independents records
	Conf.			Overall
Team	W	L	T	W		L		T
Jefferson (TX)		–		8	–	0	–	0
Catholic University		–		6	–	1	–	1
South Georgia Teachers		–		6	–	2	–	0
Western Maryland		–		5	–	1	–	2
George Washington		–		6	–	2	–	1
Texas Mines		–		7	–	3	–	0
William & Mary Norfolk		–		6	–	3	–	1
Troy State		–		5	–	3	–	2
Delaware		–		5	–	4	–	0
Wake Forest		–		3	–	3	–	2
West Virginia		–		5	–	5	–	0
Georgetown		–		2	–	6	–	1
Navy		–		2	–	6	–	1
Oglethorpe		–		1	–	6	–	0
East Carolina		–		0	–	5	–	0

The 1932 South Georgia Teachers Blue Tide football team represented the South Georgia Teachers College—now known as Georgia Southern University—during the 1932 college football season. The team was led by Crook Smith in his fourth year as head coach.

== Schedule ==
Date	Time	Opponent	Site	Result	Source
October 7		at Gordon (GA)	Barnesville, GA	W 19–0	
October 14		at Georgia Military	Davenport Field; Milledgeville, GA	L 7–29	
October 21		Norman Junior College	Statesboro, GA	W 8–0	
October 28	3:30 p.m.	at Georgia State College	College athletic field; Tifton, GA	W 27–0	
November 5		at Rollins	Tinker Field; Orlando, FL	L 0–12	
November 11		Piedmont	Statesboro, GA	W 31–12	
November 18		Middle Georgia	Statesboro, GA	W 26–0	
November 24		Brewton–Parker	Statesboro, GA	W 18–6	
All times are in Eastern time
