= 1932 George Washington Colonials football team =

American college football season

1932 George Washington Colonials football
- Conference: Independent
- Record: 6–2–1
- Head coach: Jim Pixlee (4th season)
- Home stadium: Griffith Stadium

1932 Southern college football independents records
	Conf.			Overall
Team	W	L	T	W		L		T
Jefferson (TX)		–		8	–	0	–	0
Catholic University		–		6	–	1	–	1
South Georgia Teachers		–		6	–	2	–	0
Western Maryland		–		5	–	1	–	2
George Washington		–		6	–	2	–	1
Texas Mines		–		7	–	3	–	0
William & Mary Norfolk		–		6	–	3	–	1
Troy State		–		5	–	3	–	2
Delaware		–		5	–	4	–	0
Wake Forest		–		3	–	3	–	2
West Virginia		–		5	–	5	–	0
Georgetown		–		2	–	6	–	1
Navy		–		2	–	6	–	1
Oglethorpe		–		1	–	6	–	0
East Carolina		–		0	–	5	–	0

The 1932 George Washington Colonials football team was an American football team that represented George Washington University as an independent during the 1932 college football season. In its fourth season under head coach Jim Pixlee, the team compiled a 6–2–1 record and outscored opponents by a total of 149 to 76. In intersectional play, the team defeated Iowa, tied with Oklahoma, and lost to Alabama and Tulsa.

When Iowa traveled to Washington, D.C., for its game with George Washington, coach Pixlee requested that Iowa withhold its two African-American players from the game and also not allow them to enter the dressing room or sit on the bench. Iowa coach Ossie Solem agreed that the two would not play but refused the other requests, stating "there isn't anyone big enough in Washington to keep me from taking all my players into the dressing room and onto the playing field."

== Schedule ==
Date	Opponent	Site	Result	Attendance	Source
September 24	at Washington and Lee	Wilson Field; Lexington, VA	W 18–0	3,000	
October 1	Westminster (PA)	Griffith Stadium; Washington, DC	W 24–0		
October 8	Alabama	Griffith Stadium; Washington, DC	L 6–28	26,000	
October 15	Catawba	Griffith Stadium; Washington, DC	W 27–0	6,000	
October 22	at Tulsa	Skelly Field; Tulsa, OK	L 14–29	7,000	
October 28	Iowa	Griffith Stadium; Washington, DC	W 21–6	11,000	
November 4	North Dakota Agricultural	Griffith Stadium; Washington, DC	W 20–0	12,000	
November 11	William & Mary	Griffith Stadium; Washington, DC	W 12–6	10,000	
November 24	Oklahoma	Griffith Stadium; Washington, DC	T 7–7	19,000	
