= 1932 Navy Midshipmen football team =

American college football season

1932 Navy Midshipmen football
- Conference: Independent
- Record: 2–6–1
- Head coach: Edgar Miller (2nd season)
- Captain: Jim Reedy
- Home stadium: Thompson Stadium

1932 Southern college football independents records
| | Conf. | | | Overall |
| Team | W | L | T | W | | L | | T |
|---|---|---|---|---|---|---|---|---|
| Jefferson (TX) | | – | | 8 | – | 0 | – | 0 |
| Catholic University | | – | | 6 | – | 1 | – | 1 |
| South Georgia Teachers | | – | | 6 | – | 2 | – | 0 |
| Western Maryland | | – | | 5 | – | 1 | – | 2 |
| George Washington | | – | | 6 | – | 2 | – | 1 |
| Texas Mines | | – | | 7 | – | 3 | – | 0 |
| William & Mary Norfolk | | – | | 6 | – | 3 | – | 1 |
| Troy State | | – | | 5 | – | 3 | – | 2 |
| Delaware | | – | | 5 | – | 4 | – | 0 |
| Wake Forest | | – | | 3 | – | 3 | – | 2 |
| West Virginia | | – | | 5 | – | 5 | – | 0 |
| Georgetown | | – | | 2 | – | 6 | – | 1 |
| Navy | | – | | 2 | – | 6 | – | 1 |
| Oglethorpe | | – | | 1 | – | 6 | – | 0 |
| East Carolina | | – | | 0 | – | 5 | – | 0 |

The 1932 Navy Midshipmen football team represented the United States Naval Academy during the 1932 college football season. In their second season under head coach Edgar Miller, the Midshipmen compiled a 2–6 record and were outscored by opponents by a combined score of 80 to 67.

== Schedule ==
| Date | Time | Opponent | Site | Result | Attendance | Source |
|---|---|---|---|---|---|---|
| October 1 | | William & Mary | Thompson Stadium; Annapolis, MD | L 0–6 | | |
| October 8 | | Washington and Lee | Thompson Stadium; Annapolis, MD | W 33–0 | | |
| October 15 | | Ohio | Thompson Stadium; Annapolis, MD | L 0–14 | | |
| October 22 | | at Princeton | Palmer Stadium; Princeton, NJ | T 0–0 | 40,000 | |
| October 29 | | at Penn | Franklin Field; Philadelphia, PA | L 0–14 | 50,000 | |
| November 5 | | Columbia | Thompson Stadium; Annapolis, MD | L 6–7 | | |
| November 12 | 2:00 p.m. | vs. Maryland | Municipal Stadium; Baltimore, MD (rivalry) | W 28–7 | | |
| November 19 | | vs. Notre Dame | Municipal Stadium; Cleveland OH (rivalry) | L 0–12 | 61,122 | |
| December 3 | | vs. Army | Franklin Field; Philadelphia, PA (Army–Navy Game) | L 0–20 | 80,000 | |
All times are in Eastern time
