= 1932 Southern Conference football season =

- League: NCAA
- Sport: College football
- Duration: September 17, 1932 through December 17, 1932
- Number of teams: 23

Regular Season
- Season champions: Tennessee; Auburn; LSU

Football seasons
- ← 1931 1933 →

1932 Southern Conference football standings
	Conf.					Overall
Team	W		L		T	W		L		T
No. 9 Tennessee +	7	–	0	–	1	9	–	0	–	1
Auburn +	6	–	0	–	1	9	–	0	–	1
LSU +	4	–	0	–	0	6	–	3	–	1
VPI	6	–	1	–	0	8	–	1	–	0
Vanderbilt	4	–	1	–	2	6	–	1	–	2
NC State	3	–	1	–	1	6	–	1	–	2
Alabama	5	–	2	–	0	8	–	2	–	0
Tulane	5	–	2	–	1	6	–	2	–	1
Duke	5	–	3	–	0	7	–	3	–	0
Georgia Tech	4	–	4	–	1	4	–	5	–	1
Kentucky	4	–	5	–	0	4	–	5	–	0
Virginia	2	–	3	–	0	5	–	4	–	0
Ole Miss	2	–	3	–	0	5	–	6	–	0
Georgia	2	–	4	–	2	2	–	5	–	2
Maryland	2	–	4	–	0	5	–	6	–	0
North Carolina	2	–	5	–	1	3	–	5	–	2
South Carolina	1	–	2	–	1	5	–	4	–	2
VMI	1	–	4	–	0	2	–	8	–	0
Washington and Lee	1	–	4	–	0	1	–	9	–	0
Florida	1	–	6	–	0	3	–	6	–	0
Clemson	0	–	4	–	0	3	–	5	–	1
Mississippi State	0	–	4	–	0	3	–	5	–	0
Sewanee	0	–	6	–	0	2	–	7	–	1
+ – Conference co-champions; Rankings from Dickinson System

The 1932 Southern Conference football season was the college football games played by the member schools of the Southern Conference as part of the 1932 college football season. The season began on September 17.

This is the last season before many teams leave to form the Southeastern Conference, which still exists today.

== Regular season ==
Index to colors and formatting
Non-conference matchup; SoCon member won
Non-conference matchup; SoCon member lost
Non-conference matchup; tie
Conference matchup

SoCon teams in bold.

=== Week One ===
Date	Visiting team	Home team	Site	Result	Attendance	Reference
September 17	Middle Tennessee State Teachers	**Sewanee**	McGee Field • Sewanee, Tennessee	**W** 12–0		
September 17	King (TN)	**VMI**	Alumni Field • Lexington, Virginia	**W** 6–0		

=== Week Two ===
Date	Visiting team	Home team	Site	Result	Attendance	Reference
September 23	Birmingham–Southern	**Auburn**	Cramton Bowl • Montgomery, Alabama	**W** 61–0		
September 23	Presbyterian	**Clemson**	Riggs Field • Calhoun, South Carolina	**W** 13–0		
September 24	Southwestern (TN)	**Alabama**	Denny Stadium • Tuscaloosa, Alabama	**W** 45–6	6,000	
September 24	Davidson	**Duke**	Duke Stadium • Durham, North Carolina	**W** 13–0		
September 24	**VMI**	**Kentucky**	McLean Stadium • Lexington, Kentucky	**UK** 23–0		
September 24	TCU	**LSU**	Tiger Stadium • Baton Rouge, Louisiana	**T** 3–3		
September 24	Mississippi State Teachers	**Ole Miss**	Hemingway Stadium • Oxford, Mississippi	**W** 49–0		
September 24	Appalachian State	**NC State**	Riddick Stadium • Raleigh, North Carolina	**W** 38–0		
September 24	**Sewanee**	**South Carolina**	State Fairgrounds • Columbia, South Carolina	**SCAR** 7–3	8,000	
September 24	**Tennessee**	Chattanooga	Chamberlain Field • Chattanooga, Tennessee	**W** 13–0	3,635	
September 24	Mercer	**Vanderbilt**	Dudley Field • Nashville, Tennessee	**W** 20–7	5,000	
September 24	Hampden–Sydney	**Virginia**	Scott Stadium • Charlottesville, Virginia	**W** 32–0		
September 24	Roanoke	**VPI**	Miles Stadium • Blacksburg, Virginia	**W** 32–7		
September 24	George Washington	**Washington & Lee**	Wilson Field • Lexington, Virginia	**L** 18–0	3,000	
September 25	Washington College	**Maryland**	Byrd Stadium • College Park, Maryland	**W** 63–0		

=== Week Three ===
Date	Visiting team	Home team	Site	Result	Attendance	Reference
October 1	**Mississippi State**	**Alabama**	Cramton Bowl • Montgomery, Alabama	**ALA** 53–0		
October 1	Erskine	**Auburn**	Drake Field • Auburn, Alabama	**W** 77–0		
October 1	**Clemson**	**Georgia Tech**	Grant Field • Atlanta, GA	**GT** 32–14	15,000	
October 1	**Duke**	**VMI**	Alumni Field • Lexington, Virginia	**DUKE** 44–0		
October 1	**VPI**	**Georgia**	Sanford Stadium • Athens, Georgia	**VPI** 7–6		
October 1	**Sewanee**	**Kentucky**	McLean Stadium • Lexington, Kentucky	**UK** 18–0		
October 1	**LSU**	Rice	Rice Field • Houston, Texas	**L** 10–8		
October 1	**NC State**	Richmond	City Stadium • Richmond, Virginia	**W** 9–0		
October 1	**Maryland**	**Virginia**	Scott Stadium • Charlottesville, Virginia	**UVA** 7–6		
October 1	**Ole Miss**	**Tennessee**	Shields–Watkins Field • Knoxville, Tennessee	**TENN** 33–0		
October 1	Texas A&M	**Tulane**	Tulane Stadium • New Orleans, Louisiana	**W** 26–14		
October 1	**Vanderbilt**	**North Carolina**	Kenan Memorial Stadium • Chapel Hill, North Carolina	**VAN** 39–7	10,000	
October 1	**Washington & Lee**	Davidson	Richardson Field • Davidson, North Carolina	**L** 7–0		

=== Week Four ===
Date	Visiting team	Home team	Site	Result	Attendance	Reference
October 8	**Alabama**	George Washington	Griffith Stadium • Washington, D. C.	**W** 28–6	26,000	
October 8	**Duke**	**Auburn**	Legion Field • Birmingham, Alabama	**AUB** 18–7	9,000	
October 8	**Clemson**	**NC State**	Riddick Stadium • Raleigh, North Carolina	**NCST** 13–0		
October 8	**Sewanee**	**Florida**	Fairfield Stadium • Jacksonville, Florida	**FLA** 19–0	9,000	
October 8	**Kentucky**	**Georgia Tech**	Grant Field • Atlanta, Georgia	**UK** 12–6		
October 8	Spring Hill	**LSU**	Tiger Stadium • Baton Rouge, Louisiana	**W** 80–0		
October 8	**VPI**	**Maryland**	Byrd Stadium • College Park, Maryland	**VPI** 23–0		
October 8	Howard (AL)	**Ole Miss**	Hemingway Stadium • Oxford, Mississippi	**W** 26–6		
October 8	Mississippi College	**Mississippi State**	Municipal Stadium • Jackson, Mississippi	**W** 18–7		
October 8	**South Carolina**	Wake Forest	Central Stadium • Charlotte, North Carolina	**L** 6–0	6,000	
October 8	**North Carolina**	**Tennessee**	Shields–Watkins Field • Knoxville, Tennessee	**TENN** 20–7		
October 8	**Georgia**	**Tulane**	Tulane Stadium • New Orleans, Louisiana	**TUL** 34–25		
October 8	Western Kentucky State Teachers	**Vanderbilt**	Dudley Field • Nashville, Tennessee	**W** 26–0	10,000	
October 8	Roanoke	**Virginia**	Scott Stadium • Charlottesville, Virginia	**W** 12–0		
October 8	**Washington & Lee**	Navy	Thompson Stadium • Annapolis, Maryland	**L** 33–0		

=== Week Five ===
Date	Visiting team	Home team	Site	Result	Attendance	Reference
October 14	Erskine	**Clemson**	Riggs Field • Calhoun, South Carolina	**W** 19–0		
October 14	Wofford	**South Carolina**	Melton Field • Columbia, South Carolina	**W** 19–0		
October 15	**Tennessee**	**Alabama**	Legion Field • Birmingham, Alabama	**TENN** 7–3	20,000	
October 15	**Auburn**	**Georgia Tech**	Grant Field • Atlanta, Georgia	**AUB** 6–0		
October 15	The Citadel	**Florida**	Florida Field • Gainesville, Florida	**W** 27–7	6,500	
October 15	**North Carolina**	**Georgia**	Sanford Stadium • Athens, Georgia	**T** 6–6	3,000	
October 15	**Ole Miss**	Centenary	Centenary Stadium • Shreveport, Louisiana	**L** 13–6	5,000	
October 15	**Mississippi State**	**LSU**	Brown Field • Monroe, Louisiana	**LSU** 24–0		
October 15	**Maryland**	**Duke**	Duke Stadium • Durham, North Carolina	**DUKE** 34–0		
October 15	Wake Forest	**NC State**	Riddick Stadium • Raleigh, North Carolina	**T** 0–0	11,000	
October 15	**Sewanee**	Southwestern (TN)	Fargason Field • Memphis, Tennessee	**W** 8–6		
October 15	**Tulane**	**Vanderbilt**	Dudley Field • Nashville, Tennessee	**T** 6–6	25,000	
October 15	**Virginia**	Columbia	Baker Field • New York City, New York	**L** 22–6		
October 15	Davidson	**VMI**	Alumni Field • Lexington, Virginia	**L** 12–0		
October 15	William & Mary	**VPI**	City Stadium • Richmond, Virginia	**W** 7–0		
October 15	**Washington & Lee**	**Kentucky**	McLean Stadium • Lexington, Kentucky	**UK** 53–7	7,000	

=== Week Six ===
Date	Visiting team	Home team	Site	Result	Attendance	Reference
October 20	**Clemson**	**South Carolina**	State Fairgrounds • Columbia, South Carolina	**SCAR** 14–0	13,000	
October 21	Wake Forest	**Duke**	Duke Stadium • Durham, North Carolina	**W** 9–0		
October 22	**Ole Miss**	**Alabama**	Denny Stadium • Tuscaloosa, Alabama	**ALA** 24–13	5,000	
October 22	**Auburn**	**Tulane**	Tulane Stadium • New Orleans, Louisiana	**AUB** 19–7	25,000	
October 22	**NC State**	**Florida**	Plant Field • Tampa, Florida	**NCST** 17–6	10,072	
October 22	**Georgia**	**Vanderbilt**	Dudley Field • Nashville, Tennessee	**VAN** 12–6	10,000	
October 22	**Georgia Tech**	**North Carolina**	Kenan Memorial Stadium • Chapel Hill, North Carolina	**GT** 43–14	15,000	
October 22	Arkansas	**LSU**	State Fair Stadium • Shreveport, Louisiana	**W** 14–0		
October 22	St. John's (MD)	**Maryland**	Byrd Stadium • College Park, Maryland	**W** 24–7	3,500	
October 22	Millsaps	**Mississippi State**	Scott Field • Starkville, Mississippi	**W** 9–8		
October 22	**Sewanee**	Tennessee Tech	Hardee Field • Sewanee, Tennessee	**T** 0–0		
October 22	Maryville (TN)	**Tennessee**	Shields–Watkins Field • Knoxville, Tennessee	**W** 60–0		
October 22	**Virginia**	**VMI**	Alumni Field • Lexington, Virginia	**VMI** 6–4		
October 22	**Kentucky**	**VPI**	Miles Stadium • Blacksburg, Virginia	**VPI** 7–0	17,000	
October 22	**Washington & Lee**	William & Mary	Bain Field • Norfolk, Virginia	**L** 7–0		

=== Week Seven ===
Date	Visiting team	Home team	Site	Result	Attendance	Reference
October 27	**Mississippi State**	Indiana	Memorial Stadium • Bloomington, Indiana	**L** 19–0	3,500	
October 29	**Alabama**	**Kentucky**	McLean Stadium • Lexington, Kentucky	**ALA** 12–7	10,000	
October 29	**Ole Miss**	**Auburn**	Cramton Bowl • Montgomery, Alabama	**AUB** 14–7		
October 29	**Clemson**	Davidson	Richardson Field • Davidson, North Carolina	**T** 7–7	5,000	
October 29	**Duke**	**Tennessee**	Shields–Watkins Field • Knoxville, Tennessee	**TENN** 16–13	13,000	
October 29	**Florida**	**Georgia**	Sanford Stadium • Athens, Georgia	**UGA** 33–12		
October 29	**Sewanee**	**LSU**	Tiger Stadium • Baton Rouge, Louisiana	**LSU** 38–0		
October 29	**Maryland**	**VMI**	City Stadium • Richmond, Virginia	**MD** 12–7		
October 29	**NC State**	**North Carolina**	Kenan Memorial Stadium • Chapel Hill, North Carolina	**UNC** 13–0		
October 29	**South Carolina**	**Tulane**	Tulane Stadium • New Orleans	**TUL** 6–0	10,000	
October 29	**Georgia Tech**	**Vanderbilt**	Dudley Field • Nashville, Tennessee	**VAN** 12–0	25,000	
October 29	St. John's (MD)	**Virginia**	Scott Stadium • Charlottesville, Virginia	**W** 20–6		
October 29	**VPI**	**Washington & Lee**	Wilson Field • Lexington, Virginia	**VPI** 32–6	4,000	

=== Week Eight ===
Date	Visiting team	Home team	Site	Result	Attendance	Reference
November 2	**Sewanee**	Penn State	New Beaver Field •State College, PA	**L** 18–6	5,500	
November 4	**Florida**	**North Carolina**	Kenan Memorial Stadium • Chapel Hill, North Carolina	**UNC** 18–13	6,000	
November 5	**VPI**	**Alabama**	Denny Stadium • Tuscaloosa, Alabama	**ALA** 9–6	11,000	
November 5	Howard (AL)	**Auburn**	Cramton Bowl • Montgomery, Alabama	**W** 25–0		
November 5	**Clemson**	The Citadel	Johnson Hagood Stadium • Charleston, South Carolina	**W** 18–6	3,000	
November 5	**Georgia**	NYU	Yankee Stadium • Bronx, New York	**L** 13–7	15,000	
November 5	**Kentucky**	**Duke**	Duke Stadium • Durham, North Carolina	**DUKE** 13–0		
November 5	**LSU**	**South Carolina**	State Fairgrounds • Columbia, South Carolina	**LSU** 6–0		
November 5	**Ole Miss**	Minnesota	Memorial Stadium • Minneapolis, Minnesota	**L** 26–0	12,000	
November 5	Davidson	**NC State**	Central High School Stadium • Charlotte, North Carolina	**W** 7–3		
November 5	**Mississippi State**	**Tennessee**	Shields–Watkins Field • Knoxville, Tennessee	**TENN** 31–0		
November 5	**Tulane**	**Georgia Tech**	Grant Field • Atlanta, Georgia	**TUL** 20–14		
November 5	**Vanderbilt**	**Maryland**	Griffith Stadium • Washington, D. C.	**VAN** 13–0		
November 5	**Washington & Lee**	**Virginia**	Scott Stadium • Charlottesville, Virginia	**W&L** 7–0		
November 5	**VMI**	William & Mary	Bain Field • Norfolk, Virginia	**L** 20–7		

=== Week Nine ===
Date	Visiting team	Home team	Site	Result	Attendance	Reference
November 11	**Georgia**	**Clemson**	Riggs Field • Calhoun, South Carolina	**UGA** 32–18	4,500	
November 12	**Alabama**	**Georgia Tech**	Grant Field • Atlanta, Georgia	**GT** 6–0		
November 12	**Florida**	**Auburn**	Cramton Bowl • Montgomery, Alabama	**AUB** 21–6		
November 12	**LSU**	Centenary	Centenary Stadium • Shreveport, Louisiana	**L** 6–0		
November 12	**Sewanee**	**Ole Miss**	Hemingway Stadium • Oxford, Mississippi	**MISS** 27–6	5,000	
November 12	Southwestern (TN)	**Mississippi State**	Scott Field • Starkville, Mississippi	**W** 6–0	1,500	
November 12	**Maryland**	Navy	Municipal Stadium • Baltimore, Maryland	**L** 28–7		
November 12	**North Carolina**	Davidson	Richardson Field • Davidson, North Carolina	**W** 12–0		
November 12	**Duke**	**NC State**	Riddick Stadium • Raleigh, North Carolina	**NCST** 6–0		
November 12	**South Carolina**	Furman	Manly Field • Greenville, South Carolina	**L** 14–0		
November 12	**Tulane**	**Kentucky**	McLean Stadium • Lexington, Kentucky	**TUL** 6–3	8,000	
November 12	**Vanderbilt**	**Tennessee**	Shields–Watkins Field • Knoxville, Tennessee	**T** 0–0		
November 12	Richmond	**VMI**	Alumni Field • Lexington, Virginia	**L** 7–0		
November 12	**Virginia**	**VPI**	Miles Stadium • Blacksburg, Virginia	**VPI** 13–0		
November 14	**Washington & Lee**	West Virginia	Laidley Field • Charleston, West Virginia	**L** 19–0		

=== Week Ten ===
Date	Visiting team	Home team	Site	Result	Attendance	Reference
November 19	**Auburn**	**Georgia**	Memorial Stadium • Columbus, Georgia	**AUB** 14–7		
November 19	**Georgia Tech**	**Florida**	Florida Field • Gainesville, Florida	**GT** 6–0		
November 19	**Duke**	**North Carolina**	Kenan Memorial Stadium • Chapel Hill, North Carolina	**DUKE** 7–0		
November 19	**Maryland**	**Washington & Lee**	Wilson Field • Lexington, VA	**MD** 6–0		
November 19	**Ole Miss**	Southwestern (TN)	Fargason Field • Memphis, Tennessee	**W** 7–0		
November 19	The Citadel	**South Carolina**	Melton Field • Columbia, South Carolina	**W** 19–0	4,000	
November 19	**Sewanee**	**Tulane**	Tulane Stadium • New Orleans, Louisiana	**TUL** 26–0	7,000	

=== Week Eleven ===
Date	Visiting team	Home team	Site	Result	Attendance	Reference
November 24	Vanderbilt	**Alabama**	Legion Field • Birmingham, Alabama	**ALA** 20–0	18,000	
November 24	Clemson	Furman	Manly Field • Greenville, South Carolina	**L** 7–0		
November 24	Maryland	Johns Hopkins	Municipal Stadium • Baltimore, Maryland	**W** 23–0	9,100	
November 24	Ole Miss	**Mississippi State**	Scott Field • Starkville, Mississippi	**MISS** 13–0		
November 24	South Carolina	**NC State**	Riddick Stadium • Raleigh, North Carolina	**T** 7–7	9,000	
November 24	Kentucky	**Tennessee**	Shields–Watkins Field • Knoxville, Tennessee	**TENN** 26–0	20,000	
November 24	North Carolina	**Virginia**	Scott Stadium • Charlottesville, Virginia	**UVA** 14–7	12,000	
November 24	VMI	**VPI**	Maher Field • Roanoke, Virginia	**VPI** 26–0	15,000	
November 24	Washington & Lee	**Duke**	Duke Stadium • Durham, North Carolina	**DUKE** 13–0		
November 26	Georgia	**Georgia Tech**	Grant Field • Atlanta, Georgia	**T** 0–0	20,000	
November 26	Tulane	**LSU**	Tiger Stadium • Baton Rouge, Louisiana	**LSU** 14–0	20,000	

=== Week Twelve ===
Date	Visiting team	Home team	Site	Result	Attendance	Reference
December 3	**South Carolina**	**Auburn**	Legion Field • Birmingham, Alabama	**T** 20–20	10,000	
December 3	**Tennessee**	**Florida**	Fairfield Stadium • Jacksonville, Florida	**TENN** 32–13		
December 3	Western Maryland	**Maryland**	Byrd Stadium • College Park, Maryland	**L** 39–7	7,000	
December 3	**Ole Miss**	Tulsa	Skelly Field • Tulsa, Oklahoma	**L** 26–0		
December 5	**Alabama**	Saint Mary's	Kezar Stadium • San Francisco, California	**W** 6–0	20,000	

=== Week Fourteen ===
Date	Visiting team	Home team	Site	Result	Attendance	Reference
December 17	**Georgia Tech**	California	Memorial Stadium • Berkeley, California	**L** 27–7	10,000	
December 17	UCLA	**Florida**	Florida Field • Gainesville, Florida	**W** 12–2	10,000	
December 17	Oregon	**LSU**	Tiger Stadium • Baton Rouge, Louisiana	**L** 12–0		

== Awards and honors ==
=== All-Americans ===
- E – David Ariail, Auburn (NEA-2; CP-1)
- E – Virgil Rayburn, Tennessee (NYS-2)
- T – Fred Crawford, Duke (AP-2; UP-2; CP-3)
- G – Thomas Hupke, Alabama (CP-2)
- C – Pete Gracey, Vanderbilt (AP-2; UP-1; NEA-2; INS-2; NYS-2; NYT-1; TR-1, CP-3; LIB; PD)
- HB – Jimmy Hitchcock, Auburn (AP-1; UP-2; CO-1; AAB-1; NEA-1; INS-1; CP-2; NYS-2; NYT-1; WC-1; FWAA; TR-1; PD; PM)
- HB – Don Zimmerman, Tulane (AP-1 [fb]; UP-1; CO-1; NEA-3; INS-2; CP-1; LIB; NYT-1)
- FB – Johnny Cain, Alabama (NEA-3 [as qb], INS-2 [as hb])

=== All-Southern team ===
The following includes the composite All-Southern team of coaches and sports writers compiled by the Associated Press.

Position	Name	First-team selectors	Team
QB	Jimmy Hitchcock	AP	Auburn
HB	Don Zimmerman	AP	Tulane
HB	Beattie Feathers	AP	Tennessee
FB	Johnny Cain	AP	Alabama
E	Virgil Rayburn	AP	Tennessee
T	Tex Leyendecker	AP	Vanderbilt
G	Thomas Hupke	AP	Alabama
C	Pete Gracey	AP	Vanderbilt
G	John Scafide	AP	Tulane
T	Fred Crawford	AP	Duke
E	David Ariail	AP	Auburn
