= 1932 VPI Gobblers football team =

American college football season

1932 VPI Gobblers football
- Conference: Southern Conference
- Record: 8–1 (6–1 SoCon)
- Head coach: Henry Redd (1st season)
- Captain: Bill Grinus
- Home stadium: Miles Stadium

1932 Southern Conference football standings
	Conf.					Overall
Team	W		L		T	W		L		T
No. 9 Tennessee +	7	–	0	–	1	9	–	0	–	1
Auburn +	6	–	0	–	1	9	–	0	–	1
LSU +	4	–	0	–	0	6	–	3	–	1
VPI	6	–	1	–	0	8	–	1	–	0
Vanderbilt	4	–	1	–	2	6	–	1	–	2
NC State	3	–	1	–	1	6	–	1	–	2
Alabama	5	–	2	–	0	8	–	2	–	0
Tulane	5	–	2	–	1	6	–	2	–	1
Duke	5	–	3	–	0	7	–	3	–	0
Georgia Tech	4	–	4	–	1	4	–	5	–	1
Kentucky	4	–	5	–	0	4	–	5	–	0
Virginia	2	–	3	–	0	5	–	4	–	0
Ole Miss	2	–	3	–	0	5	–	6	–	0
Georgia	2	–	4	–	2	2	–	5	–	2
Maryland	2	–	4	–	0	5	–	6	–	0
North Carolina	2	–	5	–	1	3	–	5	–	2
South Carolina	1	–	2	–	1	5	–	4	–	2
VMI	1	–	4	–	0	2	–	8	–	0
Washington and Lee	1	–	4	–	0	1	–	9	–	0
Florida	1	–	6	–	0	3	–	6	–	0
Clemson	0	–	4	–	0	3	–	5	–	1
Mississippi State	0	–	4	–	0	3	–	5	–	0
Sewanee	0	–	6	–	0	2	–	7	–	1
+ – Conference co-champions; Rankings from Dickinson System

The 1932 VPI Gobblers football team represented Virginia Agricultural and Mechanical College and Polytechnic Institute in the 1932 Southern Conference football season. The team was led by their head coach Henry Redd and finished with a record of eight wins and one loss (8–1).

== Schedule ==
Date	Time	Opponent	Site	Result	Attendance	Source
September 24		Roanoke*	Miles Stadium; Blacksburg, VA	W 32–7		
October 1	3:00 p.m.	at Georgia	Sanford Stadium; Athens, GA	W 7–6	7,000	
October 8	2:30 p.m.	at Maryland	Old Byrd Stadium; College Park, MD	W 23–0	11,000+	
October 15	2:30 p.m.	vs. William & Mary*	City Stadium; Richmond, VA	W 7–0	17,000	
October 22		Kentucky	Miles Stadium; Blacksburg, VA	W 7–0	8,000	
October 29	2:30 p.m.	at Washington and Lee	Wilson Field; Lexington, VA	W 32–6	4,000-5,000	
November 5		at Alabama	Denny Stadium; Tuscaloosa, AL	L 6–9	11,000	
November 12		Virginia^{†}	Miles Stadium; Blacksburg, VA (rivalry)	W 13–0	3,000	
November 24		vs. VMI	Maher Field; Roanoke, VA (rivalry)	W 26–0	12,000-15,000	
*Non-conference game; ^{†}Homecoming; All times are in Eastern time

== Before the season ==
The 1931 VPI Gobblers football team compiled a 3–4–2 record and were led by Orville Neale in his second season as head coach.

== Game summaries ==
=== Roanoke ===
Roanoke vs. VPI

Team	1	2	3	4	Total
Roanoke	0	0	7	0	7
• VPI	19	0	6	7	32

- Date: September 24, 1932
- Location: Miles Stadium
  Blacksburg, VA
- Referee: Parrish (VMI)

VPI's first game of the season was a victory over Roanoke at Miles Stadium.

The starting lineup for VPI was: Seaman (left end), Negri (left tackle), Botnick (left guard), Porterfield (center), English (right guard), Hoenstine (right tackle), Palmer (right end), Morgan (quarterback), Holsclaw (left halfback), Mills (right halfback), Robison (fullback). The substitutes were: Botnick,, Casey, Copenhaver, Dillon, Hall, Hite, Hoblitzell, Howard, Huffman, McIntire, Ochs, Ottaway, Spruill, Thomas and Woodard.

The starting lineup for Roanoke was: Thomas West (left end), Siebert "Pete" Lavinder (left tackle), Jesse Price (left guard), Stuart Thomas (center), Harry Suttner (right guard), Gene Barnett (right tackle), Herbert Copenhaver (right end), Harrison Weeks (quarterback), Harry Russell (left halfback), Claude Matthews (right halfback), Bud Miley (fullback). The substitutes were: Charles Engers, Lawrence Fisher, Lexter Holyfield, Ed Petersen, Gus Quisito, Rice, Robertson and Fred Smith.

=== Georgia ===
VPI at Georgia

Team	1	2	3	4	Total
• VPI	0	7	0	0	7
Georgia	0	0	0	6	6

- Date: October 1, 1932
- Location: Sanford Stadium
  Athens, GA
- Game start: 3:00 p.m.
- Game attendance: 7,000
- Referee: Moon Ducote

After their victory over Roanoke, VPI played the University of Georgia at Sanford Stadium in Athens, Georgia.

VPI Captain Bill Grinus blocked the tying extra point in the upset over Georgia.

The starting lineup for VPI was: Seaman (left end), Hoenstine (left tackle), Murphy (left guard), Porterfield (center), Hite (right guard), Grinus (right tackle), McIntire (right end), Morgan (quarterback), Mills (left halfback), Holsclaw (right halfback), G. Smith (fullback). The substitutes were: Casey.

The starting lineup for Georgia was: McCarthy Crenshaw (left end), Davis (left tackle), John Brown (left guard), J. Vason McWhorter (center), Leroy Moorehead (right guard), Opp (right tackle), Fred Miller (right end), Wendell Sullivan (quarterback), George Chapman (left halfback), Samuel Brown (right halfback), Lloyd Gilmore (fullback). The substitutes were: Graham Batchelor, William David, Paul Hart, Homer Key and Charles Turbeyville.

=== Maryland ===
VPI at Maryland

Team	1	2	3	4	Total
• VPI	7	14	2	0	23
Maryland	0	0	0	0	0

- Date: October 8, 1932
- Location: Old Byrd Stadium
  College Park, MD
- Game start: 2:30 p.m.
- Game attendance: 11,000+
- Referee: Paul Magoffin

The starting lineup for VPI was: Seaman (left end), Negri (left tackle), Murphy (left guard), Porterfield (center), Hite (right guard), Grinus (right tackle), McIntire (right end), Morgan (quarterback), Mills (left halfback), Holsclaw (right halfback), G. Smith (fullback). The substitutes were: Botnick, Casey, Copenhaver, English, Groth, Hall, Hoenstine, Howard, Huffman, Ottaway, Palmer, Simmons and Thomas.

The starting lineup for Maryland was: Rufus Vincent (left end), Vaul Rouzer (left tackle), Albert Farrel (left guard), Scott (center), John McDonald (right guard), George Cole (right tackle), Bill Wood (right end), Ray Poppelman (quarterback), Dick Nelson (left halfback), Earl Widmyer (right halfback), Al Woods (fullback). The substitutes were: Willis Benner, Bucky Buscher, Joseph Crecca, Donald DeVeau, Hawkins, Frank Hines, George Hockensmith, Charles Keenan, John Mayhew, Stewart McCaw, John Mitchell, Norwood Sothoron and Fred Stieber.

=== William & Mary ===
William & Mary vs. VPI

Team	1	2	3	4	Total
W&M	0	0	0	0	0
• VPI	0	0	7	0	7

- Date: October 15, 1932
- Location: City Stadium
  Richmond, VA
- Game start: 2:30 p.m.
- Game attendance: 17,000
- Game weather: "Perfect weather"
- Referee: Paul Magoffin

The starting lineup for VPI was: Seaman (left end), Grinus (left tackle), Murphy (left guard), Porterfield (center), Hite (right guard), Negri (right tackle), McIntire (right end), Morgan (quarterback), Holsclaw (left halfback), Mills (right halfback), G. Smith (fullback).

The starting lineup for William & Mary was: C. Sorenson (left end), Waddy Stewart (left tackle), Anderson (left guard), Joseph Bridgers (center), Edwin Meade (right guard), Gerry Quirk (right tackle), Thomas Halligan (right end), Bill Chalko (quarterback), Aime LaCroix (left halfback), William Palese (right halfback), Harry Spack (fullback). The substitutes were: Giles.

=== Kentucky ===
Kentucky vs. VPI

Team	1	2	3	4	Total
Kentucky	0	0	0	0	0
• VPI	0	0	7	0	7

- Date: October 22, 1932
- Location: Miles Stadium
  Blacksburg, VA
- Game attendance: 8,000
- Referee: Lane (Dartmouth)

The starting lineup for VPI was: Seaman (left end), Grinus (left tackle), Murphy (left guard), Porterfield (center), Hite (right guard), Negri (right tackle), McIntire (right end), Morgan (quarterback), Mills (left halfback), Holsclaw (right halfback), G. Smith (fullback).

The starting lineup for Kentucky was: Joe Rupert (left end), Burton Aldridge (left tackle), O. L. "Bud" Davidson (left guard), Frank Seale (center), Ralph Blevins (right guard), George Skinner (right tackle), Howard Kreuter (right end), Ralph Kercheval (quarterback), Ellis T. Johnson (left halfback), Darrell Darby (right halfback), Thomas Cassady (fullback). The substitutes were: Stanley Bach.

=== Washington and Lee ===
VPI at Washington and Lee

Team	1	2	3	4	Total
• VPI	14	0	0	18	32
W&L	6	0	0	0	6

- Date: October 29, 1932
- Location: Wilson Field
  Lexington, VA
- Game start: 2:30 p.m.
- Game attendance: 4,000-5,000
- Referee: Frank Lane

The starting lineup for VPI was: Seaman (left end), Negri (left tackle), Murphy (left guard), Porterfield (center), Hite (right guard), Grinus (right tackle), McIntire (right end), Morgan (quarterback), Mills (left halfback), Holsclaw (right halfback), G. Smith (fullback). The substitutes were: Botnick, Casey, Copenhaver, Cunningham, English, Groth, Hall, Hoblitzell, Hoenstine, Howard, Huffman, Jennings, Ottaway, Palmer, Simmons, Thomas, Tyler and Yorke.

The starting lineup for Washington and Lee was: Solomon Mosovich (left end), Robert Morris (left tackle), Amos Bolen (left guard), William Grove (center), Charles Elbrick (right guard), Clarence Carman (right tackle), Charles Smith (right end), William Seaton (quarterback), Joseph Sawyers (left halfback), Edwin Bacon (right halfback), John Jones (fullback). The substitutes were: Nace Collins, George Glynn, Samuel Mattox, Harvey Pride and William Thomas.

=== Alabama ===
VPI at Alabama

Team	1	2	3	4	Total
VPI	0	6	0	0	6
• Alabama	0	0	9	0	9

- Date: November 5, 1932
- Location: Denny Stadium
  Tuscaloosa, Alabama
- Game attendance: 11,000
- Referee: Moon Ducote

Against the Crimson Tide of the University of Alabama, VPI lost 9–6 in front 11,000 spectators at Denny Stadium, which was the second largest crowd to ever visit the stadium at the time. VPI came into the game undefeated (6-0), while Alabama was 5–1. After a scoreless first quarter, the Gobblers took a 6–0 lead in the second after Ray Mills threw an 18-yard touchdown pass to Al Casey. In the third, the score was cut to 6–2 after a bad snap to Casey from the center resulted in a safety. Later in the quarter Alabama took a 9–6 lead that it held to the end of the game when halfback Dixie Howell scored a touchdown on a nine-yard run.

Alabama's assistant coach was former VPI player Hank Crisp.

The starting lineup for VPI was: Seaman (left end), Negri (left tackle), Murphy (left guard), Porterfield (center), Hite (right guard), Grinus (right tackle), McIntire (right end), Morgan (quarterback), Mills (left halfback), Holsclaw (right halfback), G. Smith (fullback). The substitutes were: Botnick, Casey, Groth, Huffman, Palmer and Thomas.

The starting lineup for Alabama was: Foy Leach (left end), Carney Laslie (left tackle), Calvin Frey (left guard), Willis Hewes (center), Thomas Hupke (right guard), Newton Godfree (right tackle), Don Hutson (right end), Hillman Holley (quarterback), Howard Chappell (left halfback), Bub Walker (right halfback), Larry Hughes (fullback). The substitutes were: Johnny Cain, James Dildy, Ellis "Red" Houston, Dixie Howell, B'Ho Kirkland, Bill Lee and Donald Sanford.

=== Virginia ===
Virginia vs. VPI

Team	1	2	3	4	Total
UVA	0	0	0	0	0
• VPI	0	7	0	6	13

- Date: November 12, 1932
- Location: Miles Stadium
  Blacksburg, VA
- Game attendance: 3,000
- Game weather: Snow flurries
- Referee: Lane (Dartmouth)

VPI's 1932 homecoming game was a victory over rival Virginia.

The starting lineup for VPI was: Seaman (left end), Grinus (left tackle), Murphy (left guard), Porterfield (center), Hite (right guard), Huffman (right tackle), McIntire (right end), Morgan (quarterback), Mills (left halfback), Holsclaw (right halfback), G. Smith (fullback).

The starting lineup for Virginia was: William Condon (left end), Ray Burger (left tackle), Cris Tompkins (left guard), Lewis Reiss (center), Horace Hallett (right guard), Charles Poss (right tackle), Gene Wager (right end), Thomas Johnson (quarterback), Eugene Stevens (left halfback), Frank Sippley (right halfback), Spencer Berger (fullback).

=== VMI ===
VMI vs. VPI

Team	1	2	3	4	Total
VMI	0	0	0	0	0
• VPI	0	13	13	0	26

- Date: November 24, 1932
- Location: Maher Field
  Roanoke, VA
- Game attendance: 12,000-15,000
- Referee: Moon Ducote

The starting lineup for VPI was: Seaman (left end), Huffman (left tackle), Botnick (left guard), Porterfield (center), Hite (right guard), Grinus (right tackle), McIntire (right end), Morgan (quarterback), Mills (left halfback), Holsclaw (right halfback), G. Smith (fullback).

The starting lineup for VMI was: Fred Urick (left end), William Kaylor (left tackle), John Burgess (left guard), James Nimmo (center), Jones (right guard), Lowe (right tackle), Jack Walker (right end), William Smith (quarterback), Ed Law (left halfback), Charles Straub (right halfback), Ed Kostainsek (fullback).

== After the season ==
In December 1932, the VPI players elected Bill Porterfield as captain of the 1933 VPI Gobblers football team.

== Players ==
=== Roster ===
VPI 1932 roster
Bill Anderson; George Vanderslice Beamon; William Earle Betts; Benny Botnick; Al Casey; George Clark; Dick Cofer; James Henry Copenhaver; Martin Cunningham; Owens L. "Scrapper" Day; J. L. "Nick" Dillon; Edward "Red" English; George Francis; James Curtis Geddie; Bill Grinus (Capt.); Charles Alexander "Heinie" Groth; Earl "Bus" Hall; Gene Hite	William Roy Hoblitzell; Garland Woodrow Hoenstine; Duncan Holsclaw; Frank Howard; Harry Worden Howard; Roy "Tris" Huffman; Tom B. Hutcheson; Wiley Leroy Jennings; M. J. "Red" Kasun; John McIntire; Sonny Miles; Ray Mills; Charles Morgan; John Murphy; Richard Whitmore Neale; Warren "Red" Negri; John Norman Ochs; Keith Millner Oliver	James Edward Ottaway; E. Alex Pais; Benny Palmer; Bill Porterfield; Carl Francis Robison; Al Seaman; Leon Dalmain Simmons; Bill Smith; George Smith; Dave R. Smoak; Howard Arnold "Hank" Spruill; Daniel Reiser Thoma; Dave T. Thomas; W. F. "Buck" Tyler; Hazell Eugene Waldrop; Paul Kenneth Wolfe; Jim Woodard; John Lester Yorke

=== Varsity letter winners ===
Eighteen players received varsity letters for their participation on the 1932 VPI team.

Player	Hometown	Notes
Benjamin Botnick	Elmira, New York	World War II veteran (Navy).
Alfred Layden Casey	Portsmouth, Virginia	
Edward Ralph "Red" English	Altavista, Virginia	World War II veteran (Army).
Bill Grinus (Capt.)	Orient, Illinois	
Earl Jenis "Bus" Hall	Princeton, West Virginia	
Eugene Goliday Hite	Port Deposit, Maryland	Lieutenant Colonel, Army. Lost on Canadian Pacific Air Lines Flight 3505.
William Duncan Holsclaw	Charleston, West Virginia	
Roy Edward "Tris" Huffman	Culpeper, Virginia	
John A. McIntire	Moundsville, West Virginia	
Ray Mills	Keyser, West Virginia	
Charles Emmett Ashburn Morgan	South Norfolk, Virginia	
John Marshall Murphy	Knoxville, Tennessee	
Warren Anthony "Red" Negri	Danbury, Connecticut	
Benny Palmer	Newport News, Virginia	
William Breckenridge Porterfield, Jr.	Glade Spring, Virginia	World War II veteran (Lieutenant Commander, Navy).
Alfred Elsworth Seaman	Pontiac, Michigan	World War II veteran (Sergeant, Army).
George Maxie Smith	Petersburg, Virginia	
David T. Thomas	Hyattsville, Maryland	

== Coaching and training staff ==
- Head coach: Henry Redd
- Assistant coaches
  - William L. Younger
  - Line coach: Sumner D. Tilson
- Manager: H. W. Maddox, Jr.
- Freshman coaches
  - Freshman head coach: Herbert McEver
  - Backfield coach and trainer: K. A. Esleeck
  - Line coach: P. S. Hotchkiss
  - Assistant coach: P. H. Spear
  - Assistant coach: H. H. Stark
- Freshman Manager: M. A. Johnson
