= Malcolm Aitken =

American football player

No. 11
- Position: Tackle

Personal information
- Born: February 22, 1911; Memphis, Tennessee
- Died: April 24, 1981 (aged 70); Marion, Illinois
- Listed weight: 202 lb (92 kg)

Career information
- College: Tennessee (1930–1932)

Awards and highlights
- All-Southern (1932); Torchbearer Award (1933)

Malcolm Aitken (February 22, 1911 – April 24, 1981) was an American college football player.

== University of Tennessee ==
Aitken was a prominent tackle for coach Robert Neyland's Tennessee Volunteers football teams from 1930 to 1932, captain of the 1932 team. After learning coach Neyland's mother had died, Aitken organized a secret meeting with the team, and vowing to "go out and pay a debt of respect and gratitude to one of the greatest coaches football has ever known." The Vols later defeated Florida 32–13. Aitken was selected All-Southern by The Anniston Star. He earned the Torchbearer award in 1933.

== Personal life ==
Aitken married Dorothy Wright on September 24, 1934.
