= 1932 Duke Blue Devils football team =

American college football season

1932 Duke Blue Devils football
- Conference: Southern Conference
- Record: 7–3 (5–3 SoCon)
- Head coach: Wallace Wade (2nd season)
- Offensive scheme: Single-wing
- Captain: Lowell Mason
- Home stadium: Duke Stadium

1932 Southern Conference football standings
	Conf.					Overall
Team	W		L		T	W		L		T
No. 9 Tennessee +	7	–	0	–	1	9	–	0	–	1
Auburn +	6	–	0	–	1	9	–	0	–	1
LSU +	4	–	0	–	0	6	–	3	–	1
VPI	6	–	1	–	0	8	–	1	–	0
Vanderbilt	4	–	1	–	2	6	–	1	–	2
NC State	3	–	1	–	1	6	–	1	–	2
Alabama	5	–	2	–	0	8	–	2	–	0
Tulane	5	–	2	–	1	6	–	2	–	1
Duke	5	–	3	–	0	7	–	3	–	0
Georgia Tech	4	–	4	–	1	4	–	5	–	1
Kentucky	4	–	5	–	0	4	–	5	–	0
Virginia	2	–	3	–	0	5	–	4	–	0
Ole Miss	2	–	3	–	0	5	–	6	–	0
Georgia	2	–	4	–	2	2	–	5	–	2
Maryland	2	–	4	–	0	5	–	6	–	0
North Carolina	2	–	5	–	1	3	–	5	–	2
South Carolina	1	–	2	–	1	5	–	4	–	2
VMI	1	–	4	–	0	2	–	8	–	0
Washington and Lee	1	–	4	–	0	1	–	9	–	0
Florida	1	–	6	–	0	3	–	6	–	0
Clemson	0	–	4	–	0	3	–	5	–	1
Mississippi State	0	–	4	–	0	3	–	5	–	0
Sewanee	0	–	6	–	0	2	–	7	–	1
+ – Conference co-champions; Rankings from Dickinson System

The 1932 Duke Blue Devils football team was an American football team that represented Duke University during the 1932 Southern Conference football season. In its second season under head coach Wallace Wade, the team compiled a 7–3 record (5–3 against conference opponents), shut out seven opponents, and outscored all opponents by a total of 153 to 40. Lowell Mason was the team captain. The team played its home games at Duke Stadium in Durham, North Carolina.

This would be the last season until 2023 that the Blue Devils didn't play rival Georgia Tech.

== Schedule ==
Date	Opponent	Site	Result	Attendance	Source
September 24	Davidson*	Duke Stadium; Durham, NC	W 13–0		
October 1	at VMI	Alumni Field; Lexington, VA	W 44–0		
October 8	at Auburn	Legion Field; Birmingham, AL	L 7–18	9,000	
October 15	Maryland^{†}	Duke Stadium; Durham, NC	W 34–0		
October 21	Wake Forest*	Duke Stadium; Durham, NC (rivalry)	W 9–0		
October 29	at Tennessee	Shields–Watkins Field; Knoxville, TN	L 13–16	13,000	
November 5	Kentucky	Duke Stadium; Durham, NC	W 13–0		
November 12	at NC State	Riddick Stadium; Raleigh, NC (rivalry)	L 0–6		
November 19	at North Carolina	Kenan Memorial Stadium; Chapel Hill, NC (rivalry)	W 7–0	20,000	
November 26	Washington and Lee	Duke Stadium; Durham, NC	W 13–0		
*Non-conference game; ^{†}Homecoming
