= Bill Grinus =

American football player (1911–1983)

Profile
- Position: Tackle

Personal information
- Born: February 25, 1911; Virginia, US
- Died: March 28, 1983 (aged 72); Martinsville, Virginia, US

Career information
- College: VPI (1930–1932)

Awards and highlights
- All-Southern (1932)

William Grinus (February 25, 1911 – March 28, 1983) was a college football player. He was a prominent tackle for VPI from 1930 to 1932, captain of the 1932 team, a season in which he was selected All-Southern. In that season's upset of Georgia, Grinus blocked the tying extra point. He notably rescued a squirrel.
