= 1932 NC State Wolfpack football team =

American college football season

1932 NC State Wolfpack football
- Conference: Southern Conference
- Record: 6–1–2 (3–1–1 SoCon)
- Head coach: Clipper Smith (2nd season)
- Home stadium: Riddick Stadium

1932 Southern Conference football standings
	Conf.					Overall
Team	W		L		T	W		L		T
No. 9 Tennessee +	7	–	0	–	1	9	–	0	–	1
Auburn +	6	–	0	–	1	9	–	0	–	1
LSU +	4	–	0	–	0	6	–	3	–	1
VPI	6	–	1	–	0	8	–	1	–	0
Vanderbilt	4	–	1	–	2	6	–	1	–	2
NC State	3	–	1	–	1	6	–	1	–	2
Alabama	5	–	2	–	0	8	–	2	–	0
Tulane	5	–	2	–	1	6	–	2	–	1
Duke	5	–	3	–	0	7	–	3	–	0
Georgia Tech	4	–	4	–	1	4	–	5	–	1
Kentucky	4	–	5	–	0	4	–	5	–	0
Virginia	2	–	3	–	0	5	–	4	–	0
Ole Miss	2	–	3	–	0	5	–	6	–	0
Georgia	2	–	4	–	2	2	–	5	–	2
Maryland	2	–	4	–	0	5	–	6	–	0
North Carolina	2	–	5	–	1	3	–	5	–	2
South Carolina	1	–	2	–	1	5	–	4	–	2
VMI	1	–	4	–	0	2	–	8	–	0
Washington and Lee	1	–	4	–	0	1	–	9	–	0
Florida	1	–	6	–	0	3	–	6	–	0
Clemson	0	–	4	–	0	3	–	5	–	1
Mississippi State	0	–	4	–	0	3	–	5	–	0
Sewanee	0	–	6	–	0	2	–	7	–	1
+ – Conference co-champions; Rankings from Dickinson System

The 1932 NC State Wolfpack football team was an American football team that represented North Carolina State University as a member of the Southern Conference (SoCon) during the 1932 college football season. In its second season under head coach Clipper Smith, the team compiled a 6–1–2 record (3–1–1 against SoCon opponents), tied for sixth place in the conference, and was outscored by a total of 97 to 29.

== Schedule ==
Date	Opponent	Site	Result	Attendance	Source
September 24	Appalachian State*	Riddick Stadium; Raleigh, NC	W 38–0		
October 1	at Richmond*	City Stadium; Richmond, VA	W 9–0		
October 8	Clemson	Riddick Stadium; Raleigh, NC (rivalry)	W 13–0	6,500	
October 14	Wake Forest*	Riddick Stadium; Raleigh, NC (rivalry)	T 0–0	11,000	
October 22	at Florida	Plant Field; Tampa, FL	W 17–6	10,072	
October 29	at North Carolina	Kenan Memorial Stadium; Chapel Hill, NC (rivalry)	L 0–13	12,000	
November 5	vs. Davidson*	Central High School Stadium; Charlotte, NC	W 7–3		
November 12	Duke	Riddick Stadium; Raleigh, NC (rivalry)	W 6–0		
November 24	South Carolina	Riddick Stadium; Raleigh, NC	T 7–7	9,000	
*Non-conference game
