= 1932 Alabama Crimson Tide football team =

American college football season

1932 Alabama Crimson Tide football
- Conference: Southern Conference
- Record: 8–2 (5–2 SoCon)
- Head coach: Frank Thomas (2nd season)
- Captain: Johnny Cain
- Home stadium: Denny Stadium; Legion Field; Cramton Bowl

1932 Southern Conference football standings
| | Conf. | | | | | Overall |
| Team | W | | L | | T | W | | L | | T |
|---|---|---|---|---|---|---|---|---|---|---|
| No. 9 Tennessee + | 7 | – | 0 | – | 1 | 9 | – | 0 | – | 1 |
| Auburn + | 6 | – | 0 | – | 1 | 9 | – | 0 | – | 1 |
| LSU + | 4 | – | 0 | – | 0 | 6 | – | 3 | – | 1 |
| VPI | 6 | – | 1 | – | 0 | 8 | – | 1 | – | 0 |
| Vanderbilt | 4 | – | 1 | – | 2 | 6 | – | 1 | – | 2 |
| NC State | 3 | – | 1 | – | 1 | 6 | – | 1 | – | 2 |
| Alabama | 5 | – | 2 | – | 0 | 8 | – | 2 | – | 0 |
| Tulane | 5 | – | 2 | – | 1 | 6 | – | 2 | – | 1 |
| Duke | 5 | – | 3 | – | 0 | 7 | – | 3 | – | 0 |
| Georgia Tech | 4 | – | 4 | – | 1 | 4 | – | 5 | – | 1 |
| Kentucky | 4 | – | 5 | – | 0 | 4 | – | 5 | – | 0 |
| Virginia | 2 | – | 3 | – | 0 | 5 | – | 4 | – | 0 |
| Ole Miss | 2 | – | 3 | – | 0 | 5 | – | 6 | – | 0 |
| Georgia | 2 | – | 4 | – | 2 | 2 | – | 5 | – | 2 |
| Maryland | 2 | – | 4 | – | 0 | 5 | – | 6 | – | 0 |
| North Carolina | 2 | – | 5 | – | 1 | 3 | – | 5 | – | 2 |
| South Carolina | 1 | – | 2 | – | 1 | 5 | – | 4 | – | 2 |
| VMI | 1 | – | 4 | – | 0 | 2 | – | 8 | – | 0 |
| Washington and Lee | 1 | – | 4 | – | 0 | 1 | – | 9 | – | 0 |
| Florida | 1 | – | 6 | – | 0 | 3 | – | 6 | – | 0 |
| Clemson | 0 | – | 4 | – | 0 | 3 | – | 5 | – | 1 |
| Mississippi State | 0 | – | 4 | – | 0 | 3 | – | 5 | – | 0 |
| Sewanee | 0 | – | 6 | – | 0 | 2 | – | 7 | – | 1 |
+ – Conference co-champions; Rankings from Dickinson System

The 1932 Alabama Crimson Tide football team (variously "Alabama", "UA" or "Bama") represented the University of Alabama in the 1932 Southern Conference football season. It was the Crimson Tide's 39th overall and 11th and final season as a member of the Southern Conference (SoCon). The team was led by head coach Frank Thomas, in his second year, and played their home games at Denny Stadium in Tuscaloosa, at Legion Field in Birmingham and at the Cramton Bowl in Montgomery, Alabama. They finished the season with a record of eight wins and two losses (8–2 overall, 5–2 in the SoCon).

After opening the season with consecutive home victories over Southwestern and Mississippi State, Alabama traveled to George Washington and defeated the Colonials before the largest crowd to ever witness a football game in Washington, D. C. to that point. After a loss to Tennessee, Alabama rebounded with victories over Ole Miss, Kentucky and VPI (Virginia Tech) on homecoming. Following their second loss against Georgia Tech, the Crimson Tide completed their season with an upset victory over Vanderbilt and an intersectional win over Saint Mary's at San Francisco.

== Schedule ==
| Date | Opponent | Site | Result | Attendance | Source |
|---|---|---|---|---|---|
| September 24 | Southwestern (TN)* | Denny Stadium; Tuscaloosa, AL | W 45–6 | 6,000 | |
| October 1 | Mississippi State | Cramton Bowl; Montgomery, AL (rivalry) | W 53–0 | | |
| October 8 | at George Washington* | Griffith Stadium; Washington, DC | W 28–6 | 26,000 | |
| October 15 | Tennessee | Legion Field; Birmingham, AL (rivalry) | L 3–7 | 20,000 | |
| October 22 | Ole Miss | Denny Stadium; Tuscaloosa, AL (rivalry) | W 24–13 | 5,000 | |
| October 29 | at Kentucky | McLean Stadium; Lexington, KY | W 12–7 | 10,000 | |
| November 5 | VPI^{†} | Denny Stadium; Tuscaloosa, AL | W 9–6 | 11,000 | |
| November 12 | at Georgia Tech | Grant Field; Atlanta, GA (rivalry) | L 0–6 | | |
| November 24 | Vanderbilt | Legion Field; Birmingham, AL | W 20–0 | 18,000 | |
| December 3 | at Saint Mary's* | Kezar Stadium; San Francisco, CA | W 6–0 | 20,000 | |
*Non-conference game; ^{†}Homecoming

== Game summaries ==
=== Southwestern (TN) ===
| Team | 1 | 2 | 3 | 4 | Total |
|---|---|---|---|---|---|
| Southwestern; Presbyterian | 0 | 0 | 0 | 6 | 6 |
| • Alabama | 7 | 6 | 12 | 20 | 45 |

- Date: September 24
- Location: Denny Stadium
  Tuscaloosa, Alabama
- Game attendance: 6,000

In the first game of the 1932 season, Alabama defeated the Southwestern Lynx (now the Rhodes Lynx), 45–6 before 6,000 fans at Denny Stadium. In the game, Johnny Cain scored two touchdowns and Foy Leach, Larry Hughes, Bob Seawall, Dixie Howell and McDaniel each scored one touchdown in the victory.

=== Mississippi State ===
| Team | 1 | 2 | 3 | 4 | Total |
|---|---|---|---|---|---|
| Mississippi State | 0 | 0 | 0 | 0 | 0 |
| • Alabama | 7 | 14 | 19 | 13 | 53 |

- Date: October 1
- Location: Cramton Bowl
  Montgomery, Alabama

Against their long-time rival, the Mississippi State Maroons, Alabama was victorious in their conference opener 53–0 at the Cramton Bowl. In the game, Johnny Cain scored three touchdowns and Hillman Holley, Howard Chappell, Erskine Walker, Larry Hughes and Bob Turner each scored one touchdown in the victory. The Maroons only crossed midfield one in the game.

=== George Washington ===
| Team | 1 | 2 | 3 | 4 | Total |
|---|---|---|---|---|---|
| • Alabama | 7 | 7 | 7 | 7 | 28 |
| George; Washington | 0 | 6 | 0 | 0 | 6 |

- Date: October 8
- Location: Griffith Stadium
  Washington, D.C.
- Game attendance: 26,000

In what was the first road game of the season, Alabama defeated the George Washington Colonials 28–6 at Griffith Stadium. In the game, Johnny Cain scored a rushing touchdown in each of the four quarters, with Hillman Holley successfully converting all four extra point attempts. Clarence McCarver scored the only points of the game for the Colonials with his second-quarter touchdown run. The 26,000 fans that attended the game marked the largest to attend a football game in Washington.

=== Tennessee ===
Third Saturday in October

| Team | 1 | 2 | 3 | 4 | Total |
|---|---|---|---|---|---|
| • Tennessee | 0 | 0 | 0 | 7 | 7 |
| Alabama | 0 | 3 | 0 | 0 | 3 |

- Date: October 15
- Location: Legion Field
  Birmingham, Alabama
- Game attendance: 20,000

Against the rival Tennessee, Alabama was defeated by the Volunteers, 7–3 at Legion Field in rainy conditions. Alabama scored its only points of the game when Hillman Holley connected on a 12-yard field goal in the second quarter to take a 3–0 lead. Alabama held their lead through the fourth quarter when Johnny Cain had a punt of only 12-yards from his own endzone to give Tennessee the ball at the 12-yard line. Three plays later, Beattie Feathers scored on a seven-yard touchdown run and with the extra point, the Volunteers took a 7–3 lead that they would not relinquish. Due to the poor weather conditions, the game was noted for both Alabama head coach Thomas and Tennessee head coach Robert Neyland calling for punt after punt, often on first and second down, in an attempt to gain field position advantage. As a result, Feathers punted 21 times for Tennessee, and Cain punted 19 times for Alabama. Cain's 19 punts and 914 total yards still stand as the single game school records for punts and punting yardage.

=== Ole Miss ===
| Team | 1 | 2 | 3 | 4 | Total |
|---|---|---|---|---|---|
| Ole Miss | 0 | 0 | 7 | 6 | 13 |
| • Alabama | 0 | 6 | 12 | 6 | 24 |

- Date: October 22
- Location: Denny Stadium
  Tuscaloosa, Alabama

Against the rival Ole Miss, Alabama defeated the Rebels, 24–13 at Denny Stadium. Alabama scored first on a seven-yard Larry Hughes touchdown run in the second quarter to take a 6–0 lead. Johnny Cain extended the Alabama lead to 12–0 in the third with his 51-yard touchdown run only to have Ole Miss respond with an Earl Hudson touchdown run to cut the score to 12–7. Alabama then scored touchdowns on a 53-yard Erskine Walker touchdown run before Ole Miss scored on a one-yard Larry Hughes touchdown run to give the Crimson Tide an 18–13 lead. Alabama then scored on a Don Hutson touchdown run to make the final score 24–13.

=== Kentucky ===
| Team | 1 | 2 | 3 | 4 | Total |
|---|---|---|---|---|---|
| • Alabama | 6 | 0 | 0 | 6 | 12 |
| Kentucky | 7 | 0 | 0 | 0 | 7 |

- Date: October 29
- Location: McLean Stadium
  Lexington, Kentucky

In their first conference road game of the season, Alabama defeated the Kentucky Wildcats, 12–7 at McLean Stadium. Alabama scored first on a six-yard Hillman Holley touchdown run to cap a drive that included a 60-yard Holley run. However, Holley then missed the extra point and Alabama took a 6–0 lead. Later in the quarter, Howard Chappell fumbled a Kentucky punt that was recovered by O. L. Davidson at the Wildcats 19-yard line. Ellis T. Johnson scored on the ensuing drive and with his extra point, Kentucky took a 7–6 lead. The Wildcats maintained their lead through the fourth quarter when Holley scored the game-winning touchdown on a 10-yard run for the 12–7 Alabama win.

=== VPI ===
| Team | 1 | 2 | 3 | 4 | Total |
|---|---|---|---|---|---|
| VPI | 0 | 6 | 0 | 0 | 6 |
| • Alabama | 0 | 0 | 9 | 0 | 9 |

- Date: November 5
- Location: Denny Stadium
  Tuscaloosa, Alabama
- Game attendance: 11,000

Against the Fighting Gobblers of VPI (now known as the Virginia Tech Hokies), Alabama won 9–6 on homecoming at Denny Field. After a scoreless first quarter, the Gobblers took a 6–0 lead in the second after Ray Mills threw an 18-yard touchdown pass to Al Casey. In the third, the score was cut to 6–2 after a bad snap to Casey from the center resulted in a safety. Later in the quarter Alabama took a 9–6 lead that it held to the end of the game when Dixie Howell scored a touchdown on a nine-yard run.

=== Georgia Tech ===
| Team | 1 | 2 | 3 | 4 | Total |
|---|---|---|---|---|---|
| Alabama | 0 | 0 | 0 | 0 | 0 |
| • Georgia Tech | 6 | 0 | 0 | 0 | 6 |

- Date: November 12
- Location: Grant Field
  Atlanta, Georgia

Against the Georgia Tech Golden Tornado, Alabama lost 6–0 at Grant Field. The only points of the game were scored in the first quarter when Tech's C. M. Galloway scored on a 75-yard touchdown run. The game is notable for being the first Alabama football game that was broadcast live by way of telephonic broadcast to an audience at the University Gymnasium. The broadcast was thought to be the first of its type ever made in the Southern United States, and a $.25 admission fee (equivalent to $5.9 in the present day) was charged for entry to the broadcast.

=== Vanderbilt ===
| Team | 1 | 2 | 3 | 4 | Total |
|---|---|---|---|---|---|
| Vanderbilt | 0 | 0 | 0 | 0 | 0 |
| • Alabama | 0 | 13 | 0 | 7 | 20 |

- Date: November 24
- Location: Legion Field
  Birmingham, Alabama
- Game attendance: 18,000

In the days that led up to their game against Vanderbilt, many sportswriters did not give Alabama a chance against a favored Commodores squad. However, Alabama went on and defeated Vanderbilt on Thanksgiving Day 20–0 at Legion Field before 18,000 spectators. After a scoreless first quarter, Jim Dildy recovered a Vanderbilt fumble at their 16-yard line. Alabama then scored a touchdown on the possession that ensued on a short run by Johnny Cain. Later in the quarter, the Crimson Tide extended their lead to 13–0 after Dixie Howell threw a seven-yard touchdown pass to Ralph Gandy. Howell then scored the final points of the game in the fourth quarter with his 81-yard interception returned for a touchdown.

=== Saint Mary's ===
| Team | 1 | 2 | 3 | 4 | Total |
|---|---|---|---|---|---|
| • Alabama | 6 | 0 | 0 | 0 | 6 |
| Saint Mary's | 0 | 0 | 0 | 0 | 0 |

- Date: December 3
- Location: Kezar Stadium
  San Francisco
- Game attendance: 20,000

In their final game of the 1932 season, Alabama defeated the Saint Mary's Gaels 6–0 before 20,000 fans at San Francisco's Kezar Stadium. On their second offensive possession, Johnny Cain scored the only points of the game with his 71-yard touchdown run. With the exception of Cain's long run, both defenses were dominant with both the Crimson Tide and Gaels only having allowed 113 yards of total offense. Dixie Howell also starred for Alabama with his average of 45 yards for his total of 16 punts he kicked in the game.

== Personnel ==
=== Varsity letter winners ===
| Player | Hometown | Position |
|---|---|---|
| Troy Barker | Lineville, Alabama | Guard |
| Johnny Cain | Montgomery, Alabama | Fullback |
| Howard Chappell | Sylacauga, Alabama | Back |
| Joe Demyanovich | Bayonne, New Jersey | Fullback |
| Jim Dildy | Nashville, Arkansas | Tackle |
| Calvin Frey | Arkadelphia, Arkansas | Tackle |
| Ralph Gandy | Birmingham, Alabama | End |
| Newton Godfree | Alexander City, Alabama | Tackle |
| Willis Hewes | Russellville, Arkansas | Center |
| Hillman Holley | Tuscaloosa, Alabama | Back |
| Ellis "Red" Houston | Bessemer, Alabama | Center |
| Dixie Howell | Hartford, Alabama | Halfback |
| Larry Hughes | Tuscaloosa, Alabama | Back |
| Thomas Hupke | East Chicago, Indiana | Guard |
| Don Hutson | Pine Bluff, Arkansas | End |
| B'Ho Kirkland | Columbia, Alabama | Guard |
| Carney Laslie | Charlotte, North Carolina | Tackle |
| Foy Leach | Siloam Springs, Arkansas | End |
| Bill Lee | Eutaw, Alabama | Tackle |
| Frank Moseley | Montgomery, Alabama | Back |
| Donald Sanford | Parrish, Alabama | Guard |
| Williams Comer Sims | Searight, Alabama | Guard |
| M. M. Swaim | Tuscaloosa, Alabama | Guard |
| Erskine Walker | Birmingham, Alabama | Halfback |

=== Coaching staff ===
| Name | Position | Seasons at Alabama | Alma mater |
|---|---|---|---|
| Frank Thomas | Head coach | 2 | Notre Dame (1923) |
| Paul Burnum | Assistant coach | 3 | Alabama (1922) |
| Hank Crisp | Assistant coach | 12 | VPI (1920) |
| Harold Drew | Assistant coach | 2 | Bates (1916) |
| Clyde "Shorty" Propst | Assistant coach | 8 | Alabama (1924) |
| Jennings B. Whitworth | Assistant coach | 1 | Alabama (1931) |
