= 1932 South Carolina Gamecocks football team =

American college football season

1932 South Carolina Gamecocks football
- Conference: Southern Conference
- Record: 5–4–2 (1–2–1 SoCon)
- Head coach: Billy Laval (5th season)
- Captains: Harry Freeman; Bill Gilmore
- Home stadium: Melton Field

1932 Southern Conference football standings
	Conf.					Overall
Team	W		L		T	W		L		T
No. 9 Tennessee +	7	–	0	–	1	9	–	0	–	1
Auburn +	6	–	0	–	1	9	–	0	–	1
LSU +	4	–	0	–	0	6	–	3	–	1
VPI	6	–	1	–	0	8	–	1	–	0
Vanderbilt	4	–	1	–	2	6	–	1	–	2
NC State	3	–	1	–	1	6	–	1	–	2
Alabama	5	–	2	–	0	8	–	2	–	0
Tulane	5	–	2	–	1	6	–	2	–	1
Duke	5	–	3	–	0	7	–	3	–	0
Georgia Tech	4	–	4	–	1	4	–	5	–	1
Kentucky	4	–	5	–	0	4	–	5	–	0
Virginia	2	–	3	–	0	5	–	4	–	0
Ole Miss	2	–	3	–	0	5	–	6	–	0
Georgia	2	–	4	–	2	2	–	5	–	2
Maryland	2	–	4	–	0	5	–	6	–	0
North Carolina	2	–	5	–	1	3	–	5	–	2
South Carolina	1	–	2	–	1	5	–	4	–	2
VMI	1	–	4	–	0	2	–	8	–	0
Washington and Lee	1	–	4	–	0	1	–	9	–	0
Florida	1	–	6	–	0	3	–	6	–	0
Clemson	0	–	4	–	0	3	–	5	–	1
Mississippi State	0	–	4	–	0	3	–	5	–	0
Sewanee	0	–	6	–	0	2	–	7	–	1
+ – Conference co-champions; Rankings from Dickinson System

The 1932 South Carolina Gamecocks football team was an American football team that represented the University of South Carolina during the 1932 Southern Conference football season. In its fifth season under head coach Billy Laval, the team compiled a 5–4–2 record (1–2–1 in conference) and outscored opponents by a total of 93 to 68. Harry Freeman and Bill Gilmore were the team captains.

== Schedule ==
Date	Opponent	Site	Result	Attendance	Source
September 24	Sewanee	State Fairgrounds; Columbia, SC	W 7–3	8,000	
October 1	at Villanova*	Villanova Stadium; Villanova, PA	W 7–6	7,500	
October 8	vs. Wake Forest	Central Stadium; Charlotte, NC	L 0–6	6,000	
October 14	Wofford*	Melton Field; Columbia, SC	W 19–0		
October 20	Clemson	State Fairgrounds; Columbia, SC (Palmetto Bowl)	W 14–0	13,000	
October 29	at Tulane	Tulane Stadium; New Orleans, LA	L 0–6	10,000	
November 5	LSU	State Fairgrounds; Columbia, SC	L 0–6	7,000	
November 12	at Furman*	Manly Field; Greenville, SC	L 0–14		
November 19	The Citadel*	Melton Field; Columbia, SC	W 19–0	4,000	
November 24	at NC State	Riddick Stadium; Raleigh, NC (rivalry)	T 7–7	9,000	
December 3	at Auburn	Legion Field; Birmingham, AL	T 20–20	10,000	
*Non-conference game
