= 1932 Clemson Tigers football team =

American college football season

1932 Clemson Tigers football
- Conference: Southern Conference
- Record: 3–5–1 (0–4 SoCon)
- Head coach: Jess Neely (2nd season)
- Captain: Bob Miller
- Home stadium: Riggs Field

1932 Southern Conference football standings
	Conf.					Overall
Team	W		L		T	W		L		T
No. 9 Tennessee +	7	–	0	–	1	9	–	0	–	1
Auburn +	6	–	0	–	1	9	–	0	–	1
LSU +	4	–	0	–	0	6	–	3	–	1
VPI	6	–	1	–	0	8	–	1	–	0
Vanderbilt	4	–	1	–	2	6	–	1	–	2
NC State	3	–	1	–	1	6	–	1	–	2
Alabama	5	–	2	–	0	8	–	2	–	0
Tulane	5	–	2	–	1	6	–	2	–	1
Duke	5	–	3	–	0	7	–	3	–	0
Georgia Tech	4	–	4	–	1	4	–	5	–	1
Kentucky	4	–	5	–	0	4	–	5	–	0
Virginia	2	–	3	–	0	5	–	4	–	0
Ole Miss	2	–	3	–	0	5	–	6	–	0
Georgia	2	–	4	–	2	2	–	5	–	2
Maryland	2	–	4	–	0	5	–	6	–	0
North Carolina	2	–	5	–	1	3	–	5	–	2
South Carolina	1	–	2	–	1	5	–	4	–	2
VMI	1	–	4	–	0	2	–	8	–	0
Washington and Lee	1	–	4	–	0	1	–	9	–	0
Florida	1	–	6	–	0	3	–	6	–	0
Clemson	0	–	4	–	0	3	–	5	–	1
Mississippi State	0	–	4	–	0	3	–	5	–	0
Sewanee	0	–	6	–	0	2	–	7	–	1
+ – Conference co-champions; Rankings from Dickinson System

The 1932 Clemson Tigers football team was an American football team that represented Clemson College in the Southern Conference during the 1932 college football season. In their second season under head coach Jess Neely, the Tigers compiled a 3–5–1 record (0–4 against conference opponents), finished last in the conference, and was outscored by a total of 111 to 89.

Bob Miller was the team captain. Two Clemson players were selected as first-team players on the 1932 All-Southern Conference football team: back Henry Woodward and guard John Heinemann.

== Schedule ==
Date	Opponent	Site	Result	Attendance	Source
September 23	Presbyterian*	Riggs Field; Clemson, SC	W 13–0		
October 1	at Georgia Tech	Grant Field; Atlanta, GA (rivalry)	L 14–32	15,000	
October 8	at NC State	Riddick Stadium; Raleigh, NC (rivalry)	L 0–13	6,500	
October 14	Erskine*	Riggs Field; Clemson, SC	W 19–0		
October 20	at South Carolina	State Fair Grounds; Columbia, SC (rivalry)	L 0–14	13,000	
October 29	at Davidson*	Richardson Stadium; Davidson, NC	T 7–7		
November 5	at The Citadel*	Johnson Hagood Stadium; Charleston, SC	W 18–6	3,000	
November 11	Georgia	Riggs Field; Clemson, SC (rivalry)	L 18–32	4,500	
November 24	at Furman*	Manly Field; Greenville, SC	L 0–7		
*Non-conference game
