= 1932 Tennessee Volunteers football team =

American college football season

1932 Tennessee Volunteers football

SoCon co-champion
- Conference: Southern Conference
- Record: 9–0–1 (7–0–1 SoCon)
- Head coach: Robert Neyland (7th season)
- Offensive scheme: Single-wing
- Captain: Malcolm Aitken
- Home stadium: Shields–Watkins Field

1932 Southern Conference football standings
	Conf.					Overall
Team	W		L		T	W		L		T
No. 9 Tennessee +	7	–	0	–	1	9	–	0	–	1
Auburn +	6	–	0	–	1	9	–	0	–	1
LSU +	4	–	0	–	0	6	–	3	–	1
VPI	6	–	1	–	0	8	–	1	–	0
Vanderbilt	4	–	1	–	2	6	–	1	–	2
NC State	3	–	1	–	1	6	–	1	–	2
Alabama	5	–	2	–	0	8	–	2	–	0
Tulane	5	–	2	–	1	6	–	2	–	1
Duke	5	–	3	–	0	7	–	3	–	0
Georgia Tech	4	–	4	–	1	4	–	5	–	1
Kentucky	4	–	5	–	0	4	–	5	–	0
Virginia	2	–	3	–	0	5	–	4	–	0
Ole Miss	2	–	3	–	0	5	–	6	–	0
Georgia	2	–	4	–	2	2	–	5	–	2
Maryland	2	–	4	–	0	5	–	6	–	0
North Carolina	2	–	5	–	1	3	–	5	–	2
South Carolina	1	–	2	–	1	5	–	4	–	2
VMI	1	–	4	–	0	2	–	8	–	0
Washington and Lee	1	–	4	–	0	1	–	9	–	0
Florida	1	–	6	–	0	3	–	6	–	0
Clemson	0	–	4	–	0	3	–	5	–	1
Mississippi State	0	–	4	–	0	3	–	5	–	0
Sewanee	0	–	6	–	0	2	–	7	–	1
+ – Conference co-champions; Rankings from Dickinson System

The 1932 Tennessee Volunteers football team (variously "Tennessee", "UT" or the "Vols") represented the University of Tennessee in the 1932 Southern Conference football season. Playing as a member of the Southern Conference (SoCon), the team was led by head coach Robert Neyland, in his seventh year, and played their home games at Shields–Watkins Field in Knoxville, Tennessee.

The 1932 Vols won nine, lost zero and tied one game (9–0–1 overall, 7–0–1 in the SoCon) and were Southern Conference champions. It was their last year in the conference before moving to the newly formed Southeastern Conference. The team was led by its backfield with Deke Brackett and Beattie Feathers.

== Schedule ==
Date	Opponent	Site	Result	Attendance	Source
September 24	at Chattanooga*	Chamberlain Field; Chattanooga, TN	W 13–0	3,635	
October 1	Ole Miss	Shields–Watkins Field; Knoxville, TN (rivalry)	W 33–0		
October 8	North Carolina	Shields–Watkins Field; Knoxville, TN	W 20–7		
October 15	at Alabama	Legion Field; Birmingham, AL (rivalry)	W 7–3	20,000	
October 22	Maryville (TN)*	Shields–Watkins Field; Knoxville, TN	W 60–0		
October 29	Duke^{†}	Shields–Watkins Field; Knoxville, TN	W 16–13	13,000	
November 5	Mississippi State	Shields–Watkins Field; Knoxville, TN	W 31–0		
November 12	at Vanderbilt	Dudley Field; Nashville, TN (rivalry)	T 0–0		
November 24	Kentucky	Shields–Watkins Field; Knoxville, TN (rivalry)	W 26–0	20,000	
December 3	at Florida	Fairfield Stadium; Jacksonville, FL (rivalry)	W 32–13		
*Non-conference game; ^{†}Homecoming

== Game summaries ==
=== Chattanooga ===
In the season opener, the Vols defeated Chattanooga 13–0.

=== Ole Miss ===
In the second week of play, Tennessee beat Ole Miss 33–0.

=== North Carolina ===
The Volunteers defeated the Tar Heels 20–7.

=== Alabama ===
Third Saturday in October

Team	1	2	3	4	Total
• Tennessee	0	0	0	7	7
Alabama	0	3	0	0	3

- Date: October 15
- Location: Legion Field
  Birmingham, Alabama
- Game attendance: 20,000

Against rival Alabama, the Vols won 7–3 at Legion Field in rainy conditions. Alabama scored its only points of the game when Hillman Holley connected on a 12-yard field goal in the second quarter to take a 3–0 lead. Alabama held their lead through the fourth quarter when Johnny Cain had a punt of only 12-yards from his own endzone to give Tennessee the ball at the 12-yard line. Three plays later, Beattie Feathers scored on a seven-yard touchdown run and with the extra point, the Volunteers took a 7–3 lead that they would not relinquish. Due to the poor weather conditions, the game was noted for both Alabama head coach Thomas and Tennessee head coach Robert Neyland calling for punt after punt, often on first and second down, in an attempt to gain field position advantage. As a result, Feathers punted 21 times for Tennessee, and Cain punted 19 times for Alabama. Cain's 19 punts and 914 total yards still stand as the single game school records for punts and punting yardage.

=== Maryville ===
Maryville was swamped 60–0.

=== Duke ===
Team	1	2	3	4	Total
Duke	0	0	7	6	13
• Tennessee	0	6	7	3	16

- Location: Knoxville, Tennessee

In a game deemed a "thriller", the Vols beat Wallace Wade's Duke Blue Devils 16–13. Feathers ran through Duke's line time and again. The highlight of the contest came when Fred Crawford intercepted a pass and raced 72 yards for a touchdown. Wynn kicked Tennessee's winning field goal.

The starting lineup was Rayburn (left end), Franklin (left tackle), Ellis (left guard), Maples (center), Frank (right guard), Aitken (right tackle), Warmath (right end), Robinson (quarterback), Vaughn (left halfback), Feathers (right halfback), Middletown (fullback).

=== Mississippi State ===
Mississippi State was beaten 31–0.

=== Vanderbilt ===
Team	1	2	3	4	Total
Tennessee	0	0	0	0	0
Vanderbilt	0	0	0	0	0

- Location: Dudley Field
  Nashville, Tennessee

Clyde Roberts and Vanderbilt fought the Vols to a scoreless tie. The game's only score was called back in the second half. Feathers caught a pass but was called out of bounds at the 27-yard line, right in front of the Vanderbilt bench.

=== Kentucky ===
The Volunteers beat the Wildcats of Kentucky 26–0.

=== Florida ===
Team	1	2	3	4	Total
• Tennessee	20	6	6	0	32
Florida	7	0	0	6	13

- Date: December 3
- Location: Fairfield Stadium
  Jacksonville, Florida

The Vols defeated Charlie Bachman's Florida Gators 32–13. Beattie Feathers scored after the opening kickoff.

== Players ==
=== Line ===
Number	Player	Position	Games started	Hometown	Prep school	Height	Weight	Age
11	Malcolm Aitken	tackle						
54	Alfred Austele	tackle						
25	Howard Bailey	tackle						
13	Bert Bibee	center						
51	Thomas Bounds	tackle						
22	J. Molden Butcher	tackle						
20	James O. Claxton	center						
68	Vincent Cox	end						
53	Jesse Cullum	guard						
40	Hewell Duncan	guard						
21	J. B. Ellis	guard						
30	Milton Frank	tackle						
37	John Franklin	tackle						
45	Fooshee	tackle						
57	Guinn B. Goodrich	guard						
42	Ralph Hatley	guard						
31	Alton Mark	end						
46	Talmadge Maples	center						
35	C. L. McPherson	end						
34	Kenneth Needham	end						
56	Ben Ottinger	center						
52	Louis Pounders	end						
39	Virgil Rayburn	end						
33	Roy Rose	end						
49	Francis Shull	end						
60	Boyd Smith	end						
23	Gordon Smith	guard						
14	Robert Stafford	tackle						
64	H. L. Stewart	guard						
58	Sam Venable	guard						
26	Murray Warmath	end						

=== Backfield ===
Number	Player	Position	Games started	Hometown	Prep school	Height	Weight	Age
32	Malcolm Anderson	fullback						
15	John D. Bayless	quarterback						
43	Deke Brackett	quarterback						
37	Joseph D. Cohen	fullback						
28	Richard T. Dorsey	halfback						
48	Beattie Feathers	halfback						
69	Wade Kever	halfback						
41	Henry Krouse	halfback						
16	Albert Middleton	halfback						
19	Harvey Robinson	quarterback						
38	Leo Petruzze	quarterback						
18	Charles Vaughan	halfback						
24	Herman Wynn	fullback						
