= 1932 Georgia Tech Yellow Jackets football team =

American college football season

1932 Georgia Tech Yellow Jackets football
- Conference: Southern Conference
- Record: 4–5–1 (4–4–1 SoCon)
- Head coach: William Alexander (13th season)
- Captain: H. C. "Monk" Neblett
- Home stadium: Grant Field

1932 Southern Conference football standings
| | Conf. | | | | | Overall |
| Team | W | | L | | T | W | | L | | T |
|---|---|---|---|---|---|---|---|---|---|---|
| No. 9 Tennessee + | 7 | – | 0 | – | 1 | 9 | – | 0 | – | 1 |
| Auburn + | 6 | – | 0 | – | 1 | 9 | – | 0 | – | 1 |
| LSU + | 4 | – | 0 | – | 0 | 6 | – | 3 | – | 1 |
| VPI | 6 | – | 1 | – | 0 | 8 | – | 1 | – | 0 |
| Vanderbilt | 4 | – | 1 | – | 2 | 6 | – | 1 | – | 2 |
| NC State | 3 | – | 1 | – | 1 | 6 | – | 1 | – | 2 |
| Alabama | 5 | – | 2 | – | 0 | 8 | – | 2 | – | 0 |
| Tulane | 5 | – | 2 | – | 1 | 6 | – | 2 | – | 1 |
| Duke | 5 | – | 3 | – | 0 | 7 | – | 3 | – | 0 |
| Georgia Tech | 4 | – | 4 | – | 1 | 4 | – | 5 | – | 1 |
| Kentucky | 4 | – | 5 | – | 0 | 4 | – | 5 | – | 0 |
| Virginia | 2 | – | 3 | – | 0 | 5 | – | 4 | – | 0 |
| Ole Miss | 2 | – | 3 | – | 0 | 5 | – | 6 | – | 0 |
| Georgia | 2 | – | 4 | – | 2 | 2 | – | 5 | – | 2 |
| Maryland | 2 | – | 4 | – | 0 | 5 | – | 6 | – | 0 |
| North Carolina | 2 | – | 5 | – | 1 | 3 | – | 5 | – | 2 |
| South Carolina | 1 | – | 2 | – | 1 | 5 | – | 4 | – | 2 |
| VMI | 1 | – | 4 | – | 0 | 2 | – | 8 | – | 0 |
| Washington and Lee | 1 | – | 4 | – | 0 | 1 | – | 9 | – | 0 |
| Florida | 1 | – | 6 | – | 0 | 3 | – | 6 | – | 0 |
| Clemson | 0 | – | 4 | – | 0 | 3 | – | 5 | – | 1 |
| Mississippi State | 0 | – | 4 | – | 0 | 3 | – | 5 | – | 0 |
| Sewanee | 0 | – | 6 | – | 0 | 2 | – | 7 | – | 1 |
+ – Conference co-champions; Rankings from Dickinson System

The 1932 Georgia Tech Yellow Jackets football team represented the Georgia School of Technology (now known as Georgia Tech) in the 1932 college football season as a member of the Southern Conference (SoCon). The Yellow Jackets were led by head coach William Alexander in his 13th season and finished with a record of four wins, five losses, and one tie (4–5–1 overall, 4–4–1 in the SoCon).

This would be the last season until 2023 that the Yellow Jackets didn't play rival Duke.

== Schedule ==
| Date | Opponent | Site | Result | Attendance | Source |
|---|---|---|---|---|---|
| October 1 | Clemson | Grant Field; Atlanta, GA (rivalry) | W 32–14 | 15,000 | |
| October 8 | Kentucky | Grant Field; Atlanta, GA | L 6–12 | | |
| October 15 | Auburn | Grant Field; Atlanta, GA (rivalry) | L 0–6 | | |
| October 22 | at North Carolina | Kenan Memorial Stadium; Chapel Hill, NC | W 43–14 | 15,000 | |
| October 29 | at Vanderbilt | Dudley Field; Nashville, TN (rivalry) | L 0–12 | 25,000 | |
| November 5 | Tulane | Grant Field; Atlanta, GA | L 12–0 | | |
| November 12 | Alabama | Grant Field; Atlanta, GA (rivalry) | W 6–0 | | |
| November 19 | at Florida | Florida Field; Gainesville, FL | W 6–0 | | |
| November 26 | Georgia | Grant Field; Atlanta, GA (rivalry) | T 0–0 | 20,000 | |
| December 17 | at California* | Memorial Stadium; Berkeley, CA | L 7–27 | 10,000 | |
*Non-conference game
