= 1932 Auburn Tigers football team =

American college football season

1932 Auburn Tigers football

SoCon co–champion
- Conference: Southern Conference
- Record: 9–0–1 (6–0–1 SoCon)
- Head coach: Chet A. Wynne (3rd season)
- Captain: Jimmy Hitchcock
- Home stadium: Drake Field; Legion Field; Cramton Bowl

Uniform
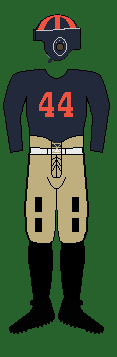

1932 Southern Conference football standings
	Conf.					Overall
Team	W		L		T	W		L		T
No. 9 Tennessee +	7	–	0	–	1	9	–	0	–	1
Auburn +	6	–	0	–	1	9	–	0	–	1
LSU +	4	–	0	–	0	6	–	3	–	1
VPI	6	–	1	–	0	8	–	1	–	0
Vanderbilt	4	–	1	–	2	6	–	1	–	2
NC State	3	–	1	–	1	6	–	1	–	2
Alabama	5	–	2	–	0	8	–	2	–	0
Tulane	5	–	2	–	1	6	–	2	–	1
Duke	5	–	3	–	0	7	–	3	–	0
Georgia Tech	4	–	4	–	1	4	–	5	–	1
Kentucky	4	–	5	–	0	4	–	5	–	0
Virginia	2	–	3	–	0	5	–	4	–	0
Ole Miss	2	–	3	–	0	5	–	6	–	0
Georgia	2	–	4	–	2	2	–	5	–	2
Maryland	2	–	4	–	0	5	–	6	–	0
North Carolina	2	–	5	–	1	3	–	5	–	2
South Carolina	1	–	2	–	1	5	–	4	–	2
VMI	1	–	4	–	0	2	–	8	–	0
Washington and Lee	1	–	4	–	0	1	–	9	–	0
Florida	1	–	6	–	0	3	–	6	–	0
Clemson	0	–	4	–	0	3	–	5	–	1
Mississippi State	0	–	4	–	0	3	–	5	–	0
Sewanee	0	–	6	–	0	2	–	7	–	1
+ – Conference co-champions; Rankings from Dickinson System

The 1932 Auburn Tigers football team represented Auburn University in the 1932 Southern Conference football season. Led by head coach Chet A. Wynne, the team went 9–0–1. The Tigers made an undefeated season and were named Southern Conference champions. The team featured Jimmy Hitchcock and Gump Ariail.

== Schedule ==
Date	Opponent	Site	Result	Attendance	Source
September 24	Birmingham–Southern*	Cramton Bowl; Montgomery, AL	W 61–0		
October 1	Erskine*^{†}	Drake Field; Auburn, AL	W 77–0		
October 8	Duke*	Legion Field; Birmingham, AL	W 18–7	9,000	
October 15	at Georgia Tech	Grant Field; Atlanta, GA (rivalry)	W 6–0		
October 22	at Tulane	Tulane Stadium; New Orleans, LA (rivalry)	W 19–7	25,000	
October 29	Ole Miss	Cramton Bowl; Montgomery, AL (rivalry)	W 14–7		
November 5	Howard (AL)*	Cramton Bowl; Montgomery, AL	W 25–0		
November 12	Florida	Cramton Bowl; Montgomery, AL (rivalry)	W 21–6		
November 19	vs. Georgia	Memorial Stadium; Columbus, GA (rivalry)	W 14–7		
December 3	South Carolina*	Legion Field; Birmingham, AL	T 20–20	10,000	
*Non-conference game; ^{†}Homecoming

== Game summaries ==
=== Birmingham–Southern ===
The season opened with a 61–0 defeat of Birmingham–Southern.

=== Erskine ===
In the second week of play, Erskine was beaten 77–0.

=== Duke ===
Auburn defeated coach Wallace Wade's Duke Blue Devils 18–7. On Jimmy Hitchcock's play, Wade said ""I have never seen a finer all-around back play against one of my teams."

=== Georgia Tech ===
Georgia Tech was beaten 6–0.

=== Tulane ===
Auburn beat the defending SoCon champion Tulane team 19–7. Hitchcock returned an interception 60 yards for a touchdown, and soon after had a 63-yard touchdown run out of a punting formation.

=== Ole Miss ===
Ole Miss was beaten by Auburn 14–7.

=== Howard ===
Howard was beaten 25–0 .

=== Florida ===
Auburn beat Florida 21–6. Hitchcock was taken out of a game for the first time in his career.

=== Georgia ===
In Columbus, Georgia was defeated 14–7 .

=== South Carolina ===
The season closed with a 20–20 tie against coach Billy Laval's South Carolina Gamecocks.

== Postseason ==
Jimmy Hitchcock was All-American.
