= 1932 Vanderbilt Commodores football team =

American college football season

1932 Vanderbilt Commodores football
- Conference: Southern Conference
- Record: 6–1–2 (4–1–2 SoCon)
- Head coach: Dan McGugin (28th season)
- Captain: Game captains
- Home stadium: Dudley Field

1932 Southern Conference football standings
	Conf.					Overall
Team	W		L		T	W		L		T
No. 9 Tennessee +	7	–	0	–	1	9	–	0	–	1
Auburn +	6	–	0	–	1	9	–	0	–	1
LSU +	4	–	0	–	0	6	–	3	–	1
VPI	6	–	1	–	0	8	–	1	–	0
Vanderbilt	4	–	1	–	2	6	–	1	–	2
NC State	3	–	1	–	1	6	–	1	–	2
Alabama	5	–	2	–	0	8	–	2	–	0
Tulane	5	–	2	–	1	6	–	2	–	1
Duke	5	–	3	–	0	7	–	3	–	0
Georgia Tech	4	–	4	–	1	4	–	5	–	1
Kentucky	4	–	5	–	0	4	–	5	–	0
Virginia	2	–	3	–	0	5	–	4	–	0
Ole Miss	2	–	3	–	0	5	–	6	–	0
Georgia	2	–	4	–	2	2	–	5	–	2
Maryland	2	–	4	–	0	5	–	6	–	0
North Carolina	2	–	5	–	1	3	–	5	–	2
South Carolina	1	–	2	–	1	5	–	4	–	2
VMI	1	–	4	–	0	2	–	8	–	0
Washington and Lee	1	–	4	–	0	1	–	9	–	0
Florida	1	–	6	–	0	3	–	6	–	0
Clemson	0	–	4	–	0	3	–	5	–	1
Mississippi State	0	–	4	–	0	3	–	5	–	0
Sewanee	0	–	6	–	0	2	–	7	–	1
+ – Conference co-champions; Rankings from Dickinson System

The 1932 Vanderbilt Commodores football team represented Vanderbilt University in the 1932 college football season as a member of the Southern Conference (SoCon). The Commodores were led by head coach Dan McGugin in his 28th season and finished with a record of six wins, one loss, and two ties (6–1–2 overall, 4–1–2 in the SEC). Pete Gracey was All-American.

== Schedule ==
Date	Opponent	Site	Result	Attendance	Source
September 24	Mercer*	Dudley Field; Nashville, TN	W 20–7	5,000	
October 1	at North Carolina	Kenan Memorial Stadium; Chapel Hill, NC	W 39–7	10,000	
October 8	Western Kentucky State Teachers*	Dudley Field; Nashville, TN	W 26–0	10,000	
October 15	at Tulane	Tulane Stadium; New Orleans, LA	T 6–6	25,000	
October 22	Georgia	Dudley Field; Nashville, TN (rivalry)	W 12–6	10,000	
October 29	Georgia Tech	Dudley Field; Nashville, TN (rivalry)	W 12–0	25,000	
November 5	vs. Maryland	Griffith Stadium; Washington, DC	W 13–0		
November 12	Tennessee	Dudley Field; Nashville, TN (rivalry)	T 0–0		
November 24	at Alabama	Legion Field; Birmingham, AL	L 0–20	18,000	
*Non-conference game
