= 1932 Maryland Terrapins football team =

American college football season

1932 Maryland Terrapins football
- Conference: Southern Conference
- Record: 5–6 (2–4 SoCon)
- Head coach: Curley Byrd (22nd season)
- Home stadium: Byrd Stadium (original)

1932 Southern Conference football standings
	Conf.					Overall
Team	W		L		T	W		L		T
No. 9 Tennessee +	7	–	0	–	1	9	–	0	–	1
Auburn +	6	–	0	–	1	9	–	0	–	1
LSU +	4	–	0	–	0	6	–	3	–	1
VPI	6	–	1	–	0	8	–	1	–	0
Vanderbilt	4	–	1	–	2	6	–	1	–	2
NC State	3	–	1	–	1	6	–	1	–	2
Alabama	5	–	2	–	0	8	–	2	–	0
Tulane	5	–	2	–	1	6	–	2	–	1
Duke	5	–	3	–	0	7	–	3	–	0
Georgia Tech	4	–	4	–	1	4	–	5	–	1
Kentucky	4	–	5	–	0	4	–	5	–	0
Virginia	2	–	3	–	0	5	–	4	–	0
Ole Miss	2	–	3	–	0	5	–	6	–	0
Georgia	2	–	4	–	2	2	–	5	–	2
Maryland	2	–	4	–	0	5	–	6	–	0
North Carolina	2	–	5	–	1	3	–	5	–	2
South Carolina	1	–	2	–	1	5	–	4	–	2
VMI	1	–	4	–	0	2	–	8	–	0
Washington and Lee	1	–	4	–	0	1	–	9	–	0
Florida	1	–	6	–	0	3	–	6	–	0
Clemson	0	–	4	–	0	3	–	5	–	1
Mississippi State	0	–	4	–	0	3	–	5	–	0
Sewanee	0	–	6	–	0	2	–	7	–	1
+ – Conference co-champions; Rankings from Dickinson System

The 1932 Maryland Terrapins football team was an American football team that represented the University of Maryland in the Southern Conference (SoCon) during the 1932 college football season. In their 22nd season under head coach Curley Byrd, the Terrapins compiled a 5–6 record (2–4 against SoCon opponents), finished 16th place in the SoCon, and were outscored by a total of 158 to 148.

== Schedule ==
Date	Time	Opponent	Site	Result	Attendance	Source
September 25		Washington College*	Byrd Stadium; College Park, MD	W 63–0		
October 1		at Virginia	Scott Stadium; Charlottesville, VA (rivalry)	L 6–7		
October 8		VPI	Byrd Stadium; College Park, MD	L 0–23		
October 15		at Duke	Duke Stadium; Durham, NC	L 0–34		
October 22		St. John's (MD)*	Byrd Stadium; College Park, MD	W 24–7	3,500	
October 29		vs. VMI	City Stadium; Richmond, VA	W 12–7		
November 5		vs. Vanderbilt	Griffith Stadium; Washington, DC	L 0–13		
November 12	2:00 p.m.	Navy*	Municipal Stadium; Baltimore, MD (rivalry)	L 7–28		
November 19		at Washington and Lee	Wilson Field; Lexington, VA	W 6–0		
November 24		vs. Johns Hopkins*	Municipal Stadium; Baltimore, MD	W 23–0	9,100	
December 3		Western Maryland*	Byrd Stadium; College Park, MD	L 7–39	7,000	
*Non-conference game; All times are in Eastern time
