= 1932 Ole Miss Rebels football team =

American college football season

1932 Ole Miss Rebels football
- Conference: Southern Conference
- Record: 5–6 (2–3 SoCon)
- Head coach: Ed Walker (3rd season)
- Home stadium: Hemingway Stadium

1932 Southern Conference football standings
	Conf.					Overall
Team	W		L		T	W		L		T
No. 9 Tennessee +	7	–	0	–	1	9	–	0	–	1
Auburn +	6	–	0	–	1	9	–	0	–	1
LSU +	4	–	0	–	0	6	–	3	–	1
VPI	6	–	1	–	0	8	–	1	–	0
Vanderbilt	4	–	1	–	2	6	–	1	–	2
NC State	3	–	1	–	1	6	–	1	–	2
Alabama	5	–	2	–	0	8	–	2	–	0
Tulane	5	–	2	–	1	6	–	2	–	1
Duke	5	–	3	–	0	7	–	3	–	0
Georgia Tech	4	–	4	–	1	4	–	5	–	1
Kentucky	4	–	5	–	0	4	–	5	–	0
Virginia	2	–	3	–	0	5	–	4	–	0
Ole Miss	2	–	3	–	0	5	–	6	–	0
Georgia	2	–	4	–	2	2	–	5	–	2
Maryland	2	–	4	–	0	5	–	6	–	0
North Carolina	2	–	5	–	1	3	–	5	–	2
South Carolina	1	–	2	–	1	5	–	4	–	2
VMI	1	–	4	–	0	2	–	8	–	0
Washington and Lee	1	–	4	–	0	1	–	9	–	0
Florida	1	–	6	–	0	3	–	6	–	0
Clemson	0	–	4	–	0	3	–	5	–	1
Mississippi State	0	–	4	–	0	3	–	5	–	0
Sewanee	0	–	6	–	0	2	–	7	–	1
+ – Conference co-champions; Rankings from Dickinson System

The 1932 Ole Miss Rebels football team represented the University of Mississippi (Ole Miss) during the 1932 college football season as a member of the Southern Conference (SoCon). The Rebels were led by head coach Ed Walker in his third season and finished with a record of five wins and six losses (5–6 overall, 2–3 in the SoCon). Zollie Swor starred for Ole Miss.

== Schedule ==
Date	Opponent	Site	Result	Attendance	Source
September 24	Mississippi State Teachers*	Hemingway Stadium; Oxford, MS	W 49–0		
October 1	at Tennessee	Shields–Watkins Field; Knoxville, TN (rivalry)	L 0–33		
October 8	Howard (AL)*	Hemingway Stadium; Oxford, MS	W 26–6		
October 15	at Centenary*	Centenary Stadium; Shreveport, LA	L 6–13	5,000	
October 22	at Alabama	Denny Stadium; Tuscaloosa, AL (rivalry)	L 13–24	5,000	
October 29	at Auburn	Cramton Bowl; Montgomery, AL (rivalry)	L 7–14		
November 5	at Minnesota*	Memorial Stadium; Minneapolis, MN	L 0–26	12,000	
November 12	Sewanee*^{†}	Hemingway Stadium; Oxford, MS	W 27–6	5,000	
November 19	at Southwestern (TN)*	Fargason Field; Memphis, TN	W 7–0		
November 24	at Mississippi State	Scott Field; Starkville, MS (Egg Bowl)	W 13–0		
December 3	at Tulsa*	Skelly Field; Tulsa, OK	L 0–26		
*Non-conference game; ^{†}Homecoming
