= 1932 VMI Keydets football team =

American college football season

1932 VMI Keydets football
- Conference: Southern Conference
- Record: 2–8 (1–4 SoCon)
- Head coach: W. C. Raftery (6th season)
- Home stadium: Alumni Field

1932 Southern Conference football standings
	Conf.					Overall
Team	W		L		T	W		L		T
No. 9 Tennessee +	7	–	0	–	1	9	–	0	–	1
Auburn +	6	–	0	–	1	9	–	0	–	1
LSU +	4	–	0	–	0	6	–	3	–	1
VPI	6	–	1	–	0	8	–	1	–	0
Vanderbilt	4	–	1	–	2	6	–	1	–	2
NC State	3	–	1	–	1	6	–	1	–	2
Alabama	5	–	2	–	0	8	–	2	–	0
Tulane	5	–	2	–	1	6	–	2	–	1
Duke	5	–	3	–	0	7	–	3	–	0
Georgia Tech	4	–	4	–	1	4	–	5	–	1
Kentucky	4	–	5	–	0	4	–	5	–	0
Virginia	2	–	3	–	0	5	–	4	–	0
Ole Miss	2	–	3	–	0	5	–	6	–	0
Georgia	2	–	4	–	2	2	–	5	–	2
Maryland	2	–	4	–	0	5	–	6	–	0
North Carolina	2	–	5	–	1	3	–	5	–	2
South Carolina	1	–	2	–	1	5	–	4	–	2
VMI	1	–	4	–	0	2	–	8	–	0
Washington and Lee	1	–	4	–	0	1	–	9	–	0
Florida	1	–	6	–	0	3	–	6	–	0
Clemson	0	–	4	–	0	3	–	5	–	1
Mississippi State	0	–	4	–	0	3	–	5	–	0
Sewanee	0	–	6	–	0	2	–	7	–	1
+ – Conference co-champions; Rankings from Dickinson System

The 1932 VMI Keydets football team was an American football team that represented the Virginia Military Institute (VMI) during the 1932 college football season as a member of the Southern Conference. In their sixth year under head coach W. C. Raftery, the team compiled an overall record of 2–8.

== Schedule ==
Date	Opponent	Site	Result	Source
September 17	King (TN)*	Alumni Field; Lexington, VA	W 18–6	
September 24	at Kentucky	McLean Stadium; Lexington, KY	L 0–23	
October 1	Duke	Alumni Field; Lexington, VA	L 0–44	
October 8	at The Citadel*	Johnson Hagood Stadium; Charleston, SC (rivalry)	L 6–12	
October 15	Davidson*	Alumni Field; Lexington, VA	L 0–12	
October 22	Virginia	Alumni Field; Lexington, VA	W 6–4	
October 29	vs. Maryland	City Stadium; Richmond, VA	L 7–12	
November 5	vs. William & Mary*	Bain Field; Norfolk, VA (rivalry)	L 7–20	
November 12	Richmond*	Alumni Field; Lexington, VA (rivalry)	L 0–7	
November 24	vs. VPI	Maher Field; Roanoke, VA (rivalry)	L 0–26	
*Non-conference game
