= 1932 Washington and Lee Generals football team =

American college football season

1932 Washington and Lee Generals football
- Conference: Southern Conference
- Record: 1–9 (1–4 SoCon)
- Head coach: Jimmy DeHart (6th season)
- Home stadium: Wilson Field

The 1932 Washington and Lee Generals football team was an American football team that represented Washington and Lee University during the 1932 college football season as a member of the Southern Conference. In their sixth year under head coach Jimmy DeHart, the team compiled an overall record of 1–9, with a mark of 1–4 in conference play.

== Standings ==
1932 Southern Conference football standings
	Conf.					Overall
Team	W		L		T	W		L		T
No. 9 Tennessee +	7	–	0	–	1	9	–	0	–	1
Auburn +	6	–	0	–	1	9	–	0	–	1
LSU +	4	–	0	–	0	6	–	3	–	1
VPI	6	–	1	–	0	8	–	1	–	0
Vanderbilt	4	–	1	–	2	6	–	1	–	2
NC State	3	–	1	–	1	6	–	1	–	2
Alabama	5	–	2	–	0	8	–	2	–	0
Tulane	5	–	2	–	1	6	–	2	–	1
Duke	5	–	3	–	0	7	–	3	–	0
Georgia Tech	4	–	4	–	1	4	–	5	–	1
Kentucky	4	–	5	–	0	4	–	5	–	0
Virginia	2	–	3	–	0	5	–	4	–	0
Ole Miss	2	–	3	–	0	5	–	6	–	0
Georgia	2	–	4	–	2	2	–	5	–	2
Maryland	2	–	4	–	0	5	–	6	–	0
North Carolina	2	–	5	–	1	3	–	5	–	2
South Carolina	1	–	2	–	1	5	–	4	–	2
VMI	1	–	4	–	0	2	–	8	–	0
Washington and Lee	1	–	4	–	0	1	–	9	–	0
Florida	1	–	6	–	0	3	–	6	–	0
Clemson	0	–	4	–	0	3	–	5	–	1
Mississippi State	0	–	4	–	0	3	–	5	–	0
Sewanee	0	–	6	–	0	2	–	7	–	1
+ – Conference co-champions; Rankings from Dickinson System

Date	Opponent	Site	Result	Attendance	Source
September 24	George Washington*	Wilson Field; Lexington, VA	L 0–18	3,000	
October 1	at Davidson*	Richardson Field; Davidson, NC	L 0–7		
October 8	at Navy*	Thompson Stadium; Annapolis, MD	L 0–33		
October 15	at Kentucky	Stoll Field; Lexington, KY	L 7–53		
October 22	vs. William & Mary*	Bain Field; Norfolk, VA	L 0–7		
October 29	VPI	Wilson Field; Lexington, VA	L 6–32	4,000	
November 5	at Virginia	Scott Stadium; Charlottesville, VA	W 7–0		
November 12	vs. West Virginia*	Laidley Field; Charleston, WV	L 0–19		
November 19	Maryland	Wilson Field; Lexington, VA	L 0–6		
November 26	at Duke	Duke Stadium; Durham, NC	L 0–13		
*Non-conference game
