= 1932 Tulane Green Wave football team =

American college football season

1932 Tulane Green Wave football
- Conference: Southern Conference
- Record: 6–2–1 (5–2–1 SoCon)
- Head coach: Ted Cox (1st season)
- Captain: Nollie Felts
- Home stadium: Tulane Stadium

1932 Southern Conference football standings
	Conf.					Overall
Team	W		L		T	W		L		T
No. 9 Tennessee +	7	–	0	–	1	9	–	0	–	1
Auburn +	6	–	0	–	1	9	–	0	–	1
LSU +	4	–	0	–	0	6	–	3	–	1
VPI	6	–	1	–	0	8	–	1	–	0
Vanderbilt	4	–	1	–	2	6	–	1	–	2
NC State	3	–	1	–	1	6	–	1	–	2
Alabama	5	–	2	–	0	8	–	2	–	0
Tulane	5	–	2	–	1	6	–	2	–	1
Duke	5	–	3	–	0	7	–	3	–	0
Georgia Tech	4	–	4	–	1	4	–	5	–	1
Kentucky	4	–	5	–	0	4	–	5	–	0
Virginia	2	–	3	–	0	5	–	4	–	0
Ole Miss	2	–	3	–	0	5	–	6	–	0
Georgia	2	–	4	–	2	2	–	5	–	2
Maryland	2	–	4	–	0	5	–	6	–	0
North Carolina	2	–	5	–	1	3	–	5	–	2
South Carolina	1	–	2	–	1	5	–	4	–	2
VMI	1	–	4	–	0	2	–	8	–	0
Washington and Lee	1	–	4	–	0	1	–	9	–	0
Florida	1	–	6	–	0	3	–	6	–	0
Clemson	0	–	4	–	0	3	–	5	–	1
Mississippi State	0	–	4	–	0	3	–	5	–	0
Sewanee	0	–	6	–	0	2	–	7	–	1
+ – Conference co-champions; Rankings from Dickinson System

The 1932 Tulane Green Wave football team was an American football team that represented Tulane University as a member of the Southern Conference (SoCon) during the 1932 Southern Conference football season. In its first season under head coach Ted Cox, Tulane compiled a 6–2–1 record (5–2–1 in conference games), finished eighth in the SoCon, and outscored opponents by a total of 131 to 95.

Don Zimmerman was All-American.

== Before the season ==
Previously in 1927, Nollie Felts played baseball with the Hattiesburg Pinetoppers of the Cotton States League, which resulted in his ineligibility ruled by the Southern Conference for the 1932 college football season. The Greenies lost "their great leader" Felts shortly before opening week against Texas A&M.

== Schedule ==
Date	Opponent	Site	Result	Attendance	Source
October 1	Texas A&M*	Tulane Stadium; New Orleans, LA	W 26–14		
October 8	Georgia	Tulane Stadium; New Orleans, LA	W 34–25		
October 15	Vanderbilt	Tulane Stadium; New Orleans, LA	T 6–6	25,000	
October 22	Auburn	Tulane Stadium; New Orleans, LA (rivalry)	L 7–19	25,000	
October 29	South Carolina	Tulane Stadium; New Orleans, LA	W 6–0	10,000	
November 5	at Georgia Tech	Grant Field; Atlanta, GA	W 20–14		
November 12	at Kentucky	Stoll Field; Lexington, KY	W 6–3	8,000	
November 19	Sewanee	Tulane Stadium; New Orleans, LA	W 26–0	7,000	
November 26	at LSU	Tiger Stadium; Baton Rouge, LA (Battle for the Rag)	L 0–14	20,000	
*Non-conference game
