= 1932 North Carolina Tar Heels football team =

American college football season

1932 North Carolina Tar Heels football
- Conference: Southern Conference
- Record: 3–5–2 (2–5–1 SoCon)
- Head coach: Chuck Collins (7th season)
- Home stadium: Kenan Memorial Stadium

1932 Southern Conference football standings
	Conf.					Overall
Team	W		L		T	W		L		T
No. 9 Tennessee +	7	–	0	–	1	9	–	0	–	1
Auburn +	6	–	0	–	1	9	–	0	–	1
LSU +	4	–	0	–	0	6	–	3	–	1
VPI	6	–	1	–	0	8	–	1	–	0
Vanderbilt	4	–	1	–	2	6	–	1	–	2
NC State	3	–	1	–	1	6	–	1	–	2
Alabama	5	–	2	–	0	8	–	2	–	0
Tulane	5	–	2	–	1	6	–	2	–	1
Duke	5	–	3	–	0	7	–	3	–	0
Georgia Tech	4	–	4	–	1	4	–	5	–	1
Kentucky	4	–	5	–	0	4	–	5	–	0
Virginia	2	–	3	–	0	5	–	4	–	0
Ole Miss	2	–	3	–	0	5	–	6	–	0
Georgia	2	–	4	–	2	2	–	5	–	2
Maryland	2	–	4	–	0	5	–	6	–	0
North Carolina	2	–	5	–	1	3	–	5	–	2
South Carolina	1	–	2	–	1	5	–	4	–	2
VMI	1	–	4	–	0	2	–	8	–	0
Washington and Lee	1	–	4	–	0	1	–	9	–	0
Florida	1	–	6	–	0	3	–	6	–	0
Clemson	0	–	4	–	0	3	–	5	–	1
Mississippi State	0	–	4	–	0	3	–	5	–	0
Sewanee	0	–	6	–	0	2	–	7	–	1
+ – Conference co-champions; Rankings from Dickinson System

The 1932 North Carolina Tar Heels football team represented the University of North Carolina (now known as the University of North Carolina at Chapel Hill) during the 1932 college football season as a member of the Southern Conference (SoCon). The Tar Heels were led by head coach Chuck Collins in his seventh season and finished with a record of three wins, five losses, and two ties (3–5–2 overall, 2–4–2 in the SoCon).

== Schedule ==
Date	Time	Opponent	Site	Result	Attendance	Source
September 24	2:30 p.m.	Wake Forest*	Kenan Memorial Stadium; Chapel Hill, NC (rivalry)	T 0–0	7,000	
October 1	2:30 p.m.	Vanderbilt	Kenan Memorial Stadium; Chapel Hill, NC	L 7–39	10,000	
October 8	3:00 p.m.	at Tennessee	Shields–Watkins Field; Knoxville, TN	L 7–20		
October 15	3:00 p.m.	at Georgia	Sanford Stadium; Athens, GA	T 6–6	3,000	
October 22	2:30 p.m.	Georgia Tech	Kenan Memorial Stadium; Chapel Hill, NC	L 14–43	15,000	
October 29	2:30 p.m.	NC State	Kenan Memorial Stadium; Chapel Hill, NC (rivalry)	W 13–0	12,000	
November 4	2:30 p.m.	Florida	Kenan Memorial Stadium; Chapel Hill, NC	W 18–13	6,000	
November 12	2:30 p.m.	at Davidson*	Richardson Stadium; Davidson, NC	W 12–0	12,000	
November 19	2:00 p.m.	Duke	Kenan Memorial Stadium; Chapel Hill, NC (rivalry)	L 0–7	20,000	
November 24	2:00 p.m.	at Virginia	Scott Stadium; Charlottesville, VA (South's Oldest Rivalry)	L 7–14	12,000	
*Non-conference game; All times are in Eastern time
