= 1932 Sewanee Tigers football team =

American college football season

1932 Sewanee Tigers football
- Conference: Southern Conference
- Record: 2–7–1 (0–6 SoCon)
- Head coach: Harry E. Clark (2nd season)
- Home stadium: Hardee Field

1932 Southern Conference football standings
| | Conf. | | | | | Overall |
| Team | W | | L | | T | W | | L | | T |
|---|---|---|---|---|---|---|---|---|---|---|
| No. 9 Tennessee + | 7 | – | 0 | – | 1 | 9 | – | 0 | – | 1 |
| Auburn + | 6 | – | 0 | – | 1 | 9 | – | 0 | – | 1 |
| LSU + | 4 | – | 0 | – | 0 | 6 | – | 3 | – | 1 |
| VPI | 6 | – | 1 | – | 0 | 8 | – | 1 | – | 0 |
| Vanderbilt | 4 | – | 1 | – | 2 | 6 | – | 1 | – | 2 |
| NC State | 3 | – | 1 | – | 1 | 6 | – | 1 | – | 2 |
| Alabama | 5 | – | 2 | – | 0 | 8 | – | 2 | – | 0 |
| Tulane | 5 | – | 2 | – | 1 | 6 | – | 2 | – | 1 |
| Duke | 5 | – | 3 | – | 0 | 7 | – | 3 | – | 0 |
| Georgia Tech | 4 | – | 4 | – | 1 | 4 | – | 5 | – | 1 |
| Kentucky | 4 | – | 5 | – | 0 | 4 | – | 5 | – | 0 |
| Virginia | 2 | – | 3 | – | 0 | 5 | – | 4 | – | 0 |
| Ole Miss | 2 | – | 3 | – | 0 | 5 | – | 6 | – | 0 |
| Georgia | 2 | – | 4 | – | 2 | 2 | – | 5 | – | 2 |
| Maryland | 2 | – | 4 | – | 0 | 5 | – | 6 | – | 0 |
| North Carolina | 2 | – | 5 | – | 1 | 3 | – | 5 | – | 2 |
| South Carolina | 1 | – | 2 | – | 1 | 5 | – | 4 | – | 2 |
| VMI | 1 | – | 4 | – | 0 | 2 | – | 8 | – | 0 |
| Washington and Lee | 1 | – | 4 | – | 0 | 1 | – | 9 | – | 0 |
| Florida | 1 | – | 6 | – | 0 | 3 | – | 6 | – | 0 |
| Clemson | 0 | – | 4 | – | 0 | 3 | – | 5 | – | 1 |
| Mississippi State | 0 | – | 4 | – | 0 | 3 | – | 5 | – | 0 |
| Sewanee | 0 | – | 6 | – | 0 | 2 | – | 7 | – | 1 |
+ – Conference co-champions; Rankings from Dickinson System

The 1932 Sewanee Tigers football team was an American football team that represented Sewanee: The University of the South as a member of the Southern Conference during the 1932 college football season. In their second season under head coach Harry E. Clark, Sewanee compiled a 2–7–1 record.

== Schedule ==
| Date | Opponent | Site | Result | Attendance | Source |
|---|---|---|---|---|---|
| September 17 | Middle Tennessee State Teachers* | Hardee Field; Sewanee, TN | W 12–0 | | |
| September 24 | at South Carolina | State Fair Grounds; Columbia, SC | L 3–7 | 8,000 | |
| October 1 | at Kentucky | McLean Stadium; Lexington, KY | L 0–18 | | |
| October 8 | at Florida | Fairfield Stadium; Jacksonville, FL | L 0–19 | | |
| October 15 | at Southwestern (TN)* | Fargason Field; Memphis, TN (rivalry) | W 8–6 | | |
| October 22 | Tennessee Tech* | Hardee Field; Sewanee, TN | T 0–0 | | |
| October 29 | at LSU | Tiger Stadium; Baton Rouge, LA | L 0–38 | | |
| November 5 | at Penn State* | New Beaver Field; State College, PA | L 6–18 | 5,500 | |
| November 12 | at Ole Miss | Hemingway Stadium; Oxford, MS | L 6–27 | 5,000 | |
| November 19 | at Tulane | Tulane Stadium; New Orleans, LA | L 0–26 | 7,000 | |
*Non-conference game
