= 1932 Virginia Cavaliers football team =

American college football season

1932 Virginia Cavaliers football
- Conference: Southern Conference
- Record: 5–4 (2–3 SoCon)
- Head coach: Fred Dawson (2nd season)
- Captain: Lewis Reiss
- Home stadium: Scott Stadium

1932 Southern Conference football standings
	Conf.					Overall
Team	W		L		T	W		L		T
No. 9 Tennessee +	7	–	0	–	1	9	–	0	–	1
Auburn +	6	–	0	–	1	9	–	0	–	1
LSU +	4	–	0	–	0	6	–	3	–	1
VPI	6	–	1	–	0	8	–	1	–	0
Vanderbilt	4	–	1	–	2	6	–	1	–	2
NC State	3	–	1	–	1	6	–	1	–	2
Alabama	5	–	2	–	0	8	–	2	–	0
Tulane	5	–	2	–	1	6	–	2	–	1
Duke	5	–	3	–	0	7	–	3	–	0
Georgia Tech	4	–	4	–	1	4	–	5	–	1
Kentucky	4	–	5	–	0	4	–	5	–	0
Virginia	2	–	3	–	0	5	–	4	–	0
Ole Miss	2	–	3	–	0	5	–	6	–	0
Georgia	2	–	4	–	2	2	–	5	–	2
Maryland	2	–	4	–	0	5	–	6	–	0
North Carolina	2	–	5	–	1	3	–	5	–	2
South Carolina	1	–	2	–	1	5	–	4	–	2
VMI	1	–	4	–	0	2	–	8	–	0
Washington and Lee	1	–	4	–	0	1	–	9	–	0
Florida	1	–	6	–	0	3	–	6	–	0
Clemson	0	–	4	–	0	3	–	5	–	1
Mississippi State	0	–	4	–	0	3	–	5	–	0
Sewanee	0	–	6	–	0	2	–	7	–	1
+ – Conference co-champions; Rankings from Dickinson System

The 1932 Virginia Cavaliers football team represented the University of Virginia during the 1932 college football season. The Cavaliers were led by second-year head coach Fred Dawson and played their home games at Scott Stadium in Charlottesville, Virginia. They competed as members of the Southern Conference, finishing with a conference record of 2–3 and a 5–4 record overall.

== Schedule ==
Date	Opponent	Site	Result	Attendance	Source
September 24	Hampden–Sydney*	Scott Stadium; Charlottesville, VA	W 32–0		
October 1	Maryland	Scott Stadium; Charlottesville, VA (rivalry)	W 7–6		
October 8	Roanoke*	Scott Stadium; Charlottesville, VA	W 12–0		
October 15	at Columbia*	Baker Field; New York, NY	L 6–22		
October 22	at VMI	Alumni Field; Lexington, VA	L 4–6		
October 29	St. John's (MD)*	Scott Stadium; Charlottesville, VA	W 20–6		
November 5	Washington and Lee^{†}	Scott Stadium; Charlottesville, VA	L 0–7		
November 12	at VPI	Miles Stadium; Blacksburg, VA (rivalry)	L 0–13	3,000	
November 24	North Carolina	Scott Stadium; Charlottesville, VA (rivalry)	W 14–7	12,000	
*Non-conference game; ^{†}Homecoming
