= 1932 LSU Tigers football team =

American college football season

1932 LSU Tigers football

SoCon co-champion
- Conference: Southeastern Conference
- Record: 6–3–1 (4–0 SEC)
- Head coach: Biff Jones (1st season)
- Offensive scheme: Single-wing
- Home stadium: Tiger Stadium

1932 Southern Conference football standings
	Conf.					Overall
Team	W		L		T	W		L		T
No. 9 Tennessee +	7	–	0	–	1	9	–	0	–	1
Auburn +	6	–	0	–	1	9	–	0	–	1
LSU +	4	–	0	–	0	6	–	3	–	1
VPI	6	–	1	–	0	8	–	1	–	0
Vanderbilt	4	–	1	–	2	6	–	1	–	2
NC State	3	–	1	–	1	6	–	1	–	2
Alabama	5	–	2	–	0	8	–	2	–	0
Tulane	5	–	2	–	1	6	–	2	–	1
Duke	5	–	3	–	0	7	–	3	–	0
Georgia Tech	4	–	4	–	1	4	–	5	–	1
Kentucky	4	–	5	–	0	4	–	5	–	0
Virginia	2	–	3	–	0	5	–	4	–	0
Ole Miss	2	–	3	–	0	5	–	6	–	0
Georgia	2	–	4	–	2	2	–	5	–	2
Maryland	2	–	4	–	0	5	–	6	–	0
North Carolina	2	–	5	–	1	3	–	5	–	2
South Carolina	1	–	2	–	1	5	–	4	–	2
VMI	1	–	4	–	0	2	–	8	–	0
Washington and Lee	1	–	4	–	0	1	–	9	–	0
Florida	1	–	6	–	0	3	–	6	–	0
Clemson	0	–	4	–	0	3	–	5	–	1
Mississippi State	0	–	4	–	0	3	–	5	–	0
Sewanee	0	–	6	–	0	2	–	7	–	1
+ – Conference co-champions; Rankings from Dickinson System

The 1932 LSU Tigers football team represented Louisiana State University (LSU) in the 1932 Southern Conference football season. This was LSU's final season as a member of the Southern Conference, and it won a share of the conference title. After the first two games, all the rest were shutouts either by LSU or the opponent.

== Before the season ==
After attempting to hire Robert Neyland, another Army alum, Biff Jones, succeeded coach Russ Cohen.

== Schedule ==
Date	Opponent	Site	Result	Attendance	Source
September 24	TCU*	Tiger Stadium; Baton Rouge, LA	T 3–3		
October 1	at Rice*	Rice Field; Houston, TX	L 8–10		
October 7	Spring Hill*	Tiger Stadium; Baton Rouge, LA	W 80–0		
October 15	vs. Mississippi State	Brown Field; Monroe, LA (rivalry)	W 24–0		
October 22	vs. Arkansas*	State Fair Stadium; Shreveport, LA (rivalry)	W 14–0		
October 29	Sewanee^{†}	Tiger Stadium; Baton Rouge, LA	W 38–0		
November 5	at South Carolina	State Fairgrounds; Columbia, SC	W 6–0		
November 12	at Centenary*	Centenary Stadium; Shreveport, LA	L 0–6		
November 26	Tulane	Tiger Stadium; Baton Rouge, LA (Battle for the Rag)	W 14–0	20,000	
December 17	Oregon*	Tiger Stadium; Baton Rouge, LA	L 0–12	1,200	
*Non-conference game; ^{†}Homecoming

== Game summaries ==
=== TCU ===
The season opened with a 3–3 tie against Johnny Vaught and Southwest Conference champion TCU.

=== Rice ===
Beginning a series that ran until 1952, LSU faced Rice. Huey Long led a 150-cadet formation through the streets of Houston. A field goal decided the game, and LSU was defeated 10–8.

=== Spring Hill ===
Spring Hill at LSU

Team	1	2	3	4	Total
Spring Hill	0	0	0	0	0
• LSU	27	7	13	33	80

- Date: October 7
- Location: Baton Rouge, LA

LSU swamped Spring Hill 80–0. The starting lineup was Fleming (left end), J. Skidmore (left tackle), Wilson (left guard), Stovall (center), Mitchell (right guard), Torrance (right tackle), Moore (right end), Lobdell (quarterback), Keller (left halfback), Sullivan (right halfback), and Yates (fullback).

=== Mississippi A&M ===
LSU then proceeded to win five straight shut-out victories. In Monroe, LSU defeated Mississippi A&M 24–0.

=== Arkansas ===
In Shreveport, against Arkansas, LSU won 14–0.

=== Sewanee ===
At homecoming, rival Sewanee was beat 38–0.

=== South Carolina ===
In Columbia, LSU defeated South Carolina 6–0.

=== Centenary ===
LSU at Centenary

Team	1	2	3	4	Total
LSU	0	0	0	0	0
• Centenary	0	0	6	0	6

- Date: November 12
- Location: Shreveport, LA

Despite being undefeated, Centenary upset LSU when it won 6–0. Paul Geisler played for Centenary. It has been said it was Centenary's greatest football win in the school's history.

=== Tulane ===
LSU beat rival and defending SoCon champion Tulane 14–0. Don Zimmerman and others were sidelined by a flu epidemic.

=== Oregon ===
Against Oregon, LSU was upset 12–0.

== Postseason ==
LSU subsequently joined the Southeastern Conference.
