= 1932 Mississippi State Maroons football team =

American college football season

1932 Mississippi State Maroons football
- Conference: Southern Conference
- Record: 3–5 (0–4 SoCon)
- Head coach: Ray G. Dauber (2nd season)
- Home stadium: Scott Field

1932 Southern Conference football standings
	Conf.					Overall
Team	W		L		T	W		L		T
No. 9 Tennessee +	7	–	0	–	1	9	–	0	–	1
Auburn +	6	–	0	–	1	9	–	0	–	1
LSU +	4	–	0	–	0	6	–	3	–	1
VPI	6	–	1	–	0	8	–	1	–	0
Vanderbilt	4	–	1	–	2	6	–	1	–	2
NC State	3	–	1	–	1	6	–	1	–	2
Alabama	5	–	2	–	0	8	–	2	–	0
Tulane	5	–	2	–	1	6	–	2	–	1
Duke	5	–	3	–	0	7	–	3	–	0
Georgia Tech	4	–	4	–	1	4	–	5	–	1
Kentucky	4	–	5	–	0	4	–	5	–	0
Virginia	2	–	3	–	0	5	–	4	–	0
Ole Miss	2	–	3	–	0	5	–	6	–	0
Georgia	2	–	4	–	2	2	–	5	–	2
Maryland	2	–	4	–	0	5	–	6	–	0
North Carolina	2	–	5	–	1	3	–	5	–	2
South Carolina	1	–	2	–	1	5	–	4	–	2
VMI	1	–	4	–	0	2	–	8	–	0
Washington and Lee	1	–	4	–	0	1	–	9	–	0
Florida	1	–	6	–	0	3	–	6	–	0
Clemson	0	–	4	–	0	3	–	5	–	1
Mississippi State	0	–	4	–	0	3	–	5	–	0
Sewanee	0	–	6	–	0	2	–	7	–	1
+ – Conference co-champions; Rankings from Dickinson System

The 1932 Mississippi State Maroons football team represented Mississippi State College (now known as Mississippi State University) during the 1932 college football season as a member of the Southern Conference (SoCon). The Maroons were led by head coach Ray G. Dauber in his second season and finished with a record of three wins and five losses (3–5 overall, 0–4 in the SoCon).

== Schedule ==
Date	Opponent	Site	Result	Attendance	Source
October 1	at Alabama	Cramton Bowl; Montgomery, AL (rivalry)	L 0–53		
October 8	at Mississippi College*	Municipal Stadium; Jackson, MS	W 18–7		
October 15	vs. LSU	Brown Field; Monroe, LA (rivalry)	L 0–24		
October 22	Millsaps*	Scott Field; Starkville, MS	W 9–8		
October 29	at Indiana*	Memorial Stadium; Bloomington, IN	L 0–19	3,500	
November 5	at Tennessee	Shields–Watkins Field; Knoxville, TN	L 0–31		
November 11	Southwestern (TN)*	Scott Field; Starkville, MS	W 6–0	1,500	
November 24	Ole Miss	Scott Field; Starkville, MS (Egg Bowl)	L 0–13		
*Non-conference game
