= 1932 Kentucky Wildcats football team =

American college football season

1932 Kentucky Wildcats football
- Conference: Southern Conference
- Record: 4–5 (4–5 SoCon)
- Head coach: Harry Gamage (6th season)
- Captain: Bud Davidson
- Home stadium: McLean Stadium

1932 Southern Conference football standings
	Conf.					Overall
Team	W		L		T	W		L		T
No. 9 Tennessee +	7	–	0	–	1	9	–	0	–	1
Auburn +	6	–	0	–	1	9	–	0	–	1
LSU +	4	–	0	–	0	6	–	3	–	1
VPI	6	–	1	–	0	8	–	1	–	0
Vanderbilt	4	–	1	–	2	6	–	1	–	2
NC State	3	–	1	–	1	6	–	1	–	2
Alabama	5	–	2	–	0	8	–	2	–	0
Tulane	5	–	2	–	1	6	–	2	–	1
Duke	5	–	3	–	0	7	–	3	–	0
Georgia Tech	4	–	4	–	1	4	–	5	–	1
Kentucky	4	–	5	–	0	4	–	5	–	0
Virginia	2	–	3	–	0	5	–	4	–	0
Ole Miss	2	–	3	–	0	5	–	6	–	0
Georgia	2	–	4	–	2	2	–	5	–	2
Maryland	2	–	4	–	0	5	–	6	–	0
North Carolina	2	–	5	–	1	3	–	5	–	2
South Carolina	1	–	2	–	1	5	–	4	–	2
VMI	1	–	4	–	0	2	–	8	–	0
Washington and Lee	1	–	4	–	0	1	–	9	–	0
Florida	1	–	6	–	0	3	–	6	–	0
Clemson	0	–	4	–	0	3	–	5	–	1
Mississippi State	0	–	4	–	0	3	–	5	–	0
Sewanee	0	–	6	–	0	2	–	7	–	1
+ – Conference co-champions; Rankings from Dickinson System

The 1932 Kentucky Wildcats football team was an American football team that represented the University of Kentucky as a member of the Southern Conference (SoCon) during the 1932 college football season. In their sixth season under head coach Harry Gamage, the Wildcats compiled an overall record of 4–5 with an identical mark against conference opponents, finished 11th in the SoCon, and outscored opponents by a total of 116 to 77. The team played its home games at McLean Stadium in Lexington, Kentucky.

== Schedule ==
Date	Opponent	Site	Result	Attendance	Source
September 24	VMI	McLean Stadium; Lexington, KY	W 23–0		
October 1	Sewanee	McLean Stadium; Lexington, KY	W 18–0		
October 8	at Georgia Tech	Grant Field; Atlanta, GA	W 12–6		
October 15	Washington & Lee	McLean Stadium; Lexington, KY	W 53–7	7,000	
October 22	at VPI	Miles Stadium; Blacksburg, VA	L 0–7	8.000	
October 29	Alabama	McLean Stadium; Lexington, KY	L 7–12	10,000	
November 5	at Duke	Duke Stadium; Durham, NC	L 0–13		
November 12	Tulane	McLean Stadium; Lexington, KY	L 3–6	8,000	
November 24	at Tennessee	Shields–Watkins Field; Knoxville, TN (rivalry)	L 0–26	20,000	
