= 1932 Appalachian State Mountaineers football team =

American college football season

1932 Appalachian State Mountaineers football
- Conference: North State Conference
- Record: 3–5–1 (1–2 NSC)
- Head coach: C. B. Johnston (4th season)
- Home stadium: College Field

1932 North State Conference football standings
	Conf.					Overall
Team	W		L		T	W		L		T
Catawba $	4	–	0	–	0	6	–	2	–	1
Lenoir–Rhyne *	4	–	1	–	0	5	–	4	–	1
Guilford	2	–	2	–	0	3	–	7	–	0
High Point	2	–	3	–	0	2	–	6	–	0
Appalachian State *	0	–	3	–	0	4	–	5	–	1
Elon	0	–	3	–	0	2	–	6	–	0
$ – Conference champion; * — Appalachian State forfeited a win over Lenoir–Rhyne due to an ineligible player.

The 1932 Appalachian State Mountaineers football team was an American football team that represented Appalachian State Teachers College (now known as Appalachian State University) as a member of the North State Conference during the 1932 college football season. In their fourth year under head coach C. B. Johnston, the Mountaineers compiled an overall record of 3–5–1, with a mark of 1–2 in conference play, and finished second in the NSC. While their on-field record was 4-4-1, the NSC forced Appalachian State to forfeit their game against Lenoir-Rhyne, therefore counting the 13-6 win as a 0-6 loss.

== Schedule ==
Date	Opponent	Site	Result	Source
September 24	at NC State*	Riddick Stadium; Raleigh, NC	L 0–38	
October 8	at Concord State*	Athens, WV	W 12–0	
October 14	at Lenoir–Rhyne	Moretz Stadium; Hickory, NC	W 13–6	
October 22	vs. Catawba	Wearn Field; Charlotte, NC	L 6–9	
November 5	at Parris Island Marines*	Parris Island, SC	T 6–6	
November 11	at High Point	High Point, NC	L 6–13	
November 19	at Maryville (TN)*	Maryville, TN	L 0–12	
November 24	at Langley Field*	Langley Field Stadium; Hampton, VA	W 12–7	
November 26	at East Carolina*	Greenville, NC	W 21–0	
*Non-conference game
