= 1932 Florida Gators football team =

American college football season

1932 Florida Gators football
- Conference: Southern Conference
- Record: 3–6 (1–6 SoCon)
- Head coach: Charlie Bachman (5th season)
- Offensive scheme: Notre Dame Box
- Captain: Joe Jenkins
- Home stadium: Florida Field

1932 Southern Conference football standings
	Conf.					Overall
Team	W		L		T	W		L		T
No. 9 Tennessee +	7	–	0	–	1	9	–	0	–	1
Auburn +	6	–	0	–	1	9	–	0	–	1
LSU +	4	–	0	–	0	6	–	3	–	1
VPI	6	–	1	–	0	8	–	1	–	0
Vanderbilt	4	–	1	–	2	6	–	1	–	2
NC State	3	–	1	–	1	6	–	1	–	2
Alabama	5	–	2	–	0	8	–	2	–	0
Tulane	5	–	2	–	1	6	–	2	–	1
Duke	5	–	3	–	0	7	–	3	–	0
Georgia Tech	4	–	4	–	1	4	–	5	–	1
Kentucky	4	–	5	–	0	4	–	5	–	0
Virginia	2	–	3	–	0	5	–	4	–	0
Ole Miss	2	–	3	–	0	5	–	6	–	0
Georgia	2	–	4	–	2	2	–	5	–	2
Maryland	2	–	4	–	0	5	–	6	–	0
North Carolina	2	–	5	–	1	3	–	5	–	2
South Carolina	1	–	2	–	1	5	–	4	–	2
VMI	1	–	4	–	0	2	–	8	–	0
Washington and Lee	1	–	4	–	0	1	–	9	–	0
Florida	1	–	6	–	0	3	–	6	–	0
Clemson	0	–	4	–	0	3	–	5	–	1
Mississippi State	0	–	4	–	0	3	–	5	–	0
Sewanee	0	–	6	–	0	2	–	7	–	1
+ – Conference co-champions; Rankings from Dickinson System

The 1932 Florida Gators football team represented the University of Florida during the 1932 college football season. The season was Charlie Bachman's fifth and last as the head coach of the Florida Gators football team. In the Gators' final year as members of the Southern Conference, they finished twentieth of twenty-three teams in the conference standings.

== Before the season ==
Coach Bachman expected the Gators to win half of their games. The Florida squad was full of sophomores.

== Schedule ==
Date	Opponent	Site	Result	Attendance	Source
October 8	vs. Sewanee	Fairfield Stadium; Jacksonville, FL	W 19–0	9,000	
October 15	The Citadel*	Florida Field; Gainesville, FL	W 27–7	6,500	
October 22	vs. NC State	Plant Field; Tampa, FL	L 6–17	10,072	
October 29	at Georgia	Sanford Stadium; Athens, GA (rivalry)	L 12–33		
November 4	at North Carolina	Kenan Memorial Stadium; Chapel Hill, NC	L 13–18	6,000	
November 12	at Auburn	Cramton Bowl; Montgomery, AL (rivalry)	L 6–21		
November 19	Georgia Tech^{†}	Florida Field; Gainesville, FL	L 0–6		
December 3	vs. Tennessee	Fairfield Stadium; Jacksonville, FL (rivalry)	L 13–32		
December 17	UCLA*	Florida Field; Gainesville, FL	W 12–2	10,000	
*Non-conference game; ^{†}Homecoming

== Game summaries ==
=== Sewanee ===
The Gators opened the season with their only conference victory, a 19–0 shutout of the struggling Sewanee Tigers. Hub McAnly ran a school record 91 yards for one score.

=== The Citadel ===
Team	1	2	3	4	Total
The Citadel	0	7	0	0	7
• Florida	7	0	14	6	27

- Date: October 15
- Location: Gainesville, Florida
- Game attendance: 6,500

In the second week of play, Florida beat The Citadel in the rain 27–7.

=== NC State ===
Team	1	2	3	4	Total
• NC State	0	7	0	10	17
Florida	0	0	6	0	6

- Date: October 22
- Location: Plant Field
  Tampa, Florida

In Tampa, the Gators lost to the NC State Wolfpack 17–6. An Al Rogero touchdown made the score 7–6, but in the fourth quarter the Wolfpack put the game out of reach.

=== Georgia ===
There was little enthusiasm as Florida departed for Athens, battered by injuries and demotions due to rule infractions. Florida lost to the Georgia Bulldogs 12–33.

=== North Carolina ===
In Chapel Hill, the Gators were defeated by the Tar Heels 13–18. The Tar Heels' Johnny Daniel returned the opening kickoff 95 yards.

=== Auburn ===
SoCon champion Auburn defeated Florida 21–6. Jimmy Hitchcock was taken out of a game for the first time in his career.

=== Georgia Tech ===
Florida was the underdog going into the Georgia Tech game, losing 6–0.

=== Tennessee ===
Team	1	2	3	4	Total
• Tennessee	20	6	6	0	32
Florida	7	0	0	6	13

- Date: December 3
- Location: Fairfield Stadium
  Jacksonville, Florida

Expected to be the hardest game since the beginning of the season, rival Tennessee beat Florida 13–32. Beattie Feathers scored after the opening kickoff.

=== UCLA ===
Notwithstanding the Gators' Depression-era struggles and 3–6 overall win–loss record, Bachman managed to end his tenure on a high note with a 12–2 intersectional upset of the UCLA Bruins in his final game.

== Postseason ==
After the season, Bachman resigned, though left some idea he might still return to Florida. Bachman ultimately accepted an offer to become the head coach of the Michigan State Spartans, and he was later inducted into the College Football Hall of Fame as a coach in 1978.

== Bibliography ==
- McEwen, Tom (1974). The Gators: A Story of Florida Football. Huntsville, Alabama: The Strode Publishers. ISBN 0-87397-025-X.
