= 1932 William & Mary Indians football team =

American college football season

1932 William & Mary Indians football
- Conference: Virginia Conference
- Record: 8–4 (4–1 Virginia)
- Head coach: John Kellison (2nd season)
- Captain: Hap Halligan

1932 Virginia Conference football standings
	Conf.					Overall
Team	W		L		T	W		L		T
Richmond $	3	–	0	–	2	4	–	2	–	2
William & Mary	4	–	1	–	0	8	–	4	–	0
Randolph–Macon	2	–	1	–	2	5	–	1	–	2
Hampden–Sydney	1	–	1	–	2	4	–	3	–	2
Roanoke	2	–	3	–	0	4	–	5	–	0
Emory and Henry	0	–	3	–	0	4	–	4	–	1
Bridgewater	0	–	3	–	0	0	–	4	–	0
$ – Conference champion

The 1932 William & Mary Indians football team represented the College of William & Mary as a member of the Virginia Conference during the 1932 college football season. Led by second-year head coach John Kellison, the Indians compiled an overall record of 8–4 with a mark of 4–1 in conference play, placing second in the Virginia Conference.

== Schedule ==
Date	Opponent	Site	Result	Attendance	Source
September 17	Roanoke	Cary Field; Williamsburg, VA	W 6–0	4,500	
September 24	Randolph–Macon	Cary Field; Williamsburg, VA	W 27–13		
October 1	at Navy*	Thompson Stadium; Annapolis, MD	W 6–0		
October 8	Guilford*	Cary Field; Williamsburg, VA	W 47–0		
October 15	vs. VPI*	City Stadium; Richmond, VA	L 0–7	17,000	
October 22	vs. Washington and Lee*	Bain Field; Norfolk, VA	W 7–0		
October 29	at Army*	Michie Stadium; West Point, NY	L 0–33	18,000	
November 2	Bridgewater	Cary Field; Williamsburg, VA	W 77–0		
November 5	vs. VMI*	Bain Field; Norfolk, VA (rivalry)	W 20–7		
November 11	at George Washington*	Griffith Stadium; Washington, DC	L 6–12	10,000	
November 19	Emory and Henry^{†}	Cary Field; Williamsburg, VA	W 18–6		
November 24	at Richmond	City Stadium; Richmond, VA (rivalry)	L 7–18		
*Non-conference game; ^{†}Homecoming; Source:
