= 1932 Georgia Bulldogs football team =

American college football season

1932 Georgia Bulldogs football
- Conference: Southern Conference
- Record: 2–5–2 (2–4–2 SoCon)
- Head coach: Harry Mehre (5th season)
- Home stadium: Sanford Stadium

1932 Southern Conference football standings
	Conf.					Overall
Team	W		L		T	W		L		T
No. 9 Tennessee +	7	–	0	–	1	9	–	0	–	1
Auburn +	6	–	0	–	1	9	–	0	–	1
LSU +	4	–	0	–	0	6	–	3	–	1
VPI	6	–	1	–	0	8	–	1	–	0
Vanderbilt	4	–	1	–	2	6	–	1	–	2
NC State	3	–	1	–	1	6	–	1	–	2
Alabama	5	–	2	–	0	8	–	2	–	0
Tulane	5	–	2	–	1	6	–	2	–	1
Duke	5	–	3	–	0	7	–	3	–	0
Georgia Tech	4	–	4	–	1	4	–	5	–	1
Kentucky	4	–	5	–	0	4	–	5	–	0
Virginia	2	–	3	–	0	5	–	4	–	0
Ole Miss	2	–	3	–	0	5	–	6	–	0
Georgia	2	–	4	–	2	2	–	5	–	2
Maryland	2	–	4	–	0	5	–	6	–	0
North Carolina	2	–	5	–	1	3	–	5	–	2
South Carolina	1	–	2	–	1	5	–	4	–	2
VMI	1	–	4	–	0	2	–	8	–	0
Washington and Lee	1	–	4	–	0	1	–	9	–	0
Florida	1	–	6	–	0	3	–	6	–	0
Clemson	0	–	4	–	0	3	–	5	–	1
Mississippi State	0	–	4	–	0	3	–	5	–	0
Sewanee	0	–	6	–	0	2	–	7	–	1
+ – Conference co-champions; Rankings from Dickinson System

The 1932 Georgia Bulldogs football team represented the University of Georgia during the 1932 college football season as a member of the Southern Conference (SoCon). The Bulldogs were led by head coach Harry Mehre in his fifth season and finished with a record of two wins, five losses, and two ties (2–5–2 overall, 2–4–2 in the SoCon).

== Schedule ==
Date	Opponent	Site	Result	Attendance	Source
October 1	VPI	Sanford Stadium; Athens, GA	L 6–7		
October 8	at Tulane	Tulane Stadium; New Orleans, LA	L 25–34		
October 15	North Carolina	Sanford Stadium; Athens, GA	T 6–6	3,000	
October 22	at Vanderbilt	Dudley Field; Nashville, TN (rivalry)	L 6–12	10,000	
October 29	Florida^{†}	Sanford Stadium; Athens, GA (rivalry)	W 33–12		
November 5	at NYU*	Yankee Stadium; Bronx, NY	L 7–13	15,000	
November 11	at Clemson	Riggs Field; Calhoun, SC (rivalry)	W 32–18	4,500	
November 19	vs. Auburn	Memorial Stadium; Columbus, GA (rivalry)	L 7–14		
November 26	at Georgia Tech	Grant Field; Atlanta, GA (rivalry)	T 0–0	20,000	
*Non-conference game; ^{†}Homecoming
