= 1932 Roanoke Maroons football team =

American college football season

1932 Roanoke Maroons football
- Conference: Virginia Conference
- Record: 4–5 (2–3 Virginia)
- Head coach: Gordon C. White (3rd season)
- Home stadium: College Field

1932 Virginia Conference football standings
	Conf.					Overall
Team	W		L		T	W		L		T
Richmond $	3	–	0	–	2	4	–	2	–	2
William & Mary	4	–	1	–	0	8	–	4	–	0
Randolph–Macon	2	–	1	–	2	5	–	1	–	2
Hampden–Sydney	1	–	1	–	2	4	–	3	–	2
Roanoke	2	–	3	–	0	4	–	5	–	0
Emory and Henry	0	–	3	–	0	4	–	4	–	1
Bridgewater	0	–	3	–	0	0	–	4	–	0
$ – Conference champion

The 1932 Roanoke Maroons football team represented Roanoke College as a member of the Virginia Conference during the 1932 college football season. Led by third-year head coach Gordon C. White, the Maroons compiled an overall record of 4–5, with a mark of 2–3 in conference play, and finished fifth in the Virginia Conference.

== Schedule ==
Date	Opponent	Site	Result	Attendance	Source
September 17	at William & Mary	Cary Field; Williamsburg, VA	L 0–6	4,500	
September 24	at VPI*	Miles Stadium; Blacksburg, VA	L 7–32		
October 1	Elon*	College Field; Salem, VA	W 19–7		
October 8	at Virginia*	Scott Stadium; Charlottesville, VA	L 0–12		
October 15	Guilford*	College Field; Salem, VA	W 6–0		
October 22	at Emory and Henry	Fullerton Field; Emory, VA	W 20–0		
October 29	Richmond	College Field; Salem, VA	L 0–7		
November 5	Hampden–Sydney^{†}	College Field; Salem, VA	W 14–0		
November 19	Randolph–Macon	College Field; Salem, VA	L 0–14		
*Non-conference game; ^{†}Homecoming
