= 1932 Richmond Spiders football team =

American college football season

1932 Richmond Spiders football

Virginia Conference champion
- Conference: Virginia Conference
- Record: 4–2–2 (3–0–2 Virginia)
- Head coach: Frank Dobson (19th season)
- Captain: Edward Perlowski
- Home stadium: City Stadium

1932 Virginia Conference football standings
	Conf.					Overall
Team	W		L		T	W		L		T
Richmond $	3	–	0	–	2	4	–	2	–	2
William & Mary	4	–	1	–	0	8	–	4	–	0
Randolph–Macon	2	–	1	–	2	5	–	1	–	2
Hampden–Sydney	1	–	1	–	2	4	–	3	–	2
Roanoke	2	–	3	–	0	4	–	5	–	0
Emory and Henry	0	–	3	–	0	4	–	4	–	1
Bridgewater	0	–	3	–	0	0	–	4	–	0
$ – Conference champion

The 1932 Richmond Spiders football team was an American football team that represented the University of Richmond as a member of the Virginia Conference during the 1932 college football season. In their 19th season under head coach Frank Dobson, Richmond compiled a 4–2–2 record and finished as Virginia champion.

== Schedule ==
Date	Opponent	Site	Result	Source
October 1	NC State*	City Stadium; Richmond, VA	L 0–9	
October 8	at Cornell*	Schoellkopf Field; Ithaca, NY	L 0–27	
October 15	at Emory and Henry	Wytheville Stadium; Wytheville, VA	W 6–0	
October 22	Hampden–Sydney	City Stadium; Richmond, VA	T 0–0	
October 29	at Roanoke	Salem, VA	W 7–0	
November 5	Randolph–Macon	City Stadium; Richmond, VA	T 6–6	
November 12	at VMI*	Alumni Field; Lexington, VA (rivalry)	W 7–0	
November 24	William & Mary	City Stadium; Richmond, VA (rivalry)	W 18–7	
*Non-conference game
