= B'Ho Kirkland =

American football player (1912–2004)

No. 38
- Position: Guard

Personal information
- Born: April 9, 1912; Columbia, Alabama, US
- Died: February 20, 2004 (aged 91)
- Listed height: 6 ft 0 in (1.83 m)
- Listed weight: 215 lb (98 kg)

Career information
- High school: Dothan (AL)
- College: Alabama

Career history
- Brooklyn Dodgers (1935–1936)

Career NFL statistics
- Games played: 23
- Games started: 17
- Stats at Pro Football Reference

B'Ho Leon Kirkland (April 9, 1912 – February 20, 2004) was an American football offensive lineman who played in the National Football League.

Born in Columbia, Alabama, he played for the University of Alabama from 1931 to 1933 and was a letterman all three years. He was picked up by the Brooklyn Dodgers in 1935. He played until 1936. In total, he played in 23 games starting 17 of those. He played with Bear Bryant both on the college level and the professional level. He was number 38.
