= Virgil Rayburn =

American football player (1910–1991)

Profile
- Position: End

Personal information
- Born: August 4, 1910; Pulaski, Tennessee, U.S.
- Died: June 15, 1991 (aged 80); Osceola, Arkansas, U.S.
- Listed height: 6 ft 1 in (1.85 m)
- Listed weight: 180 lb (82 kg)

Career information
- High school: Dyersburg
- College: University of Tennessee

Career history
- Tennessee Volunteers (1930–32); Brooklyn Dodgers (1933)

Awards and highlights
- Championships: 1 SoCon (1932); Honors: Second-team All-American (1932); First-team All-SoCon (1932)
- Stats at Pro Football Reference

Virgil Homer "Van" Rayburn (August 4, 1910 – June 15, 1991) was an American football end in the National Football League (NFL). Rayburn played college football for the Tennessee Volunteers of the University of Tennessee, where he was selected All-Southern. Rayburn was also selected a second-team All-American by the New York Sun. He played one year for the Brooklyn Dodgers in the 1933 season.
