= Riddick Stadium =

Football stadium in Raleigh, North Carolina, US

Coordinates: 35.784748°N 78.66657°W

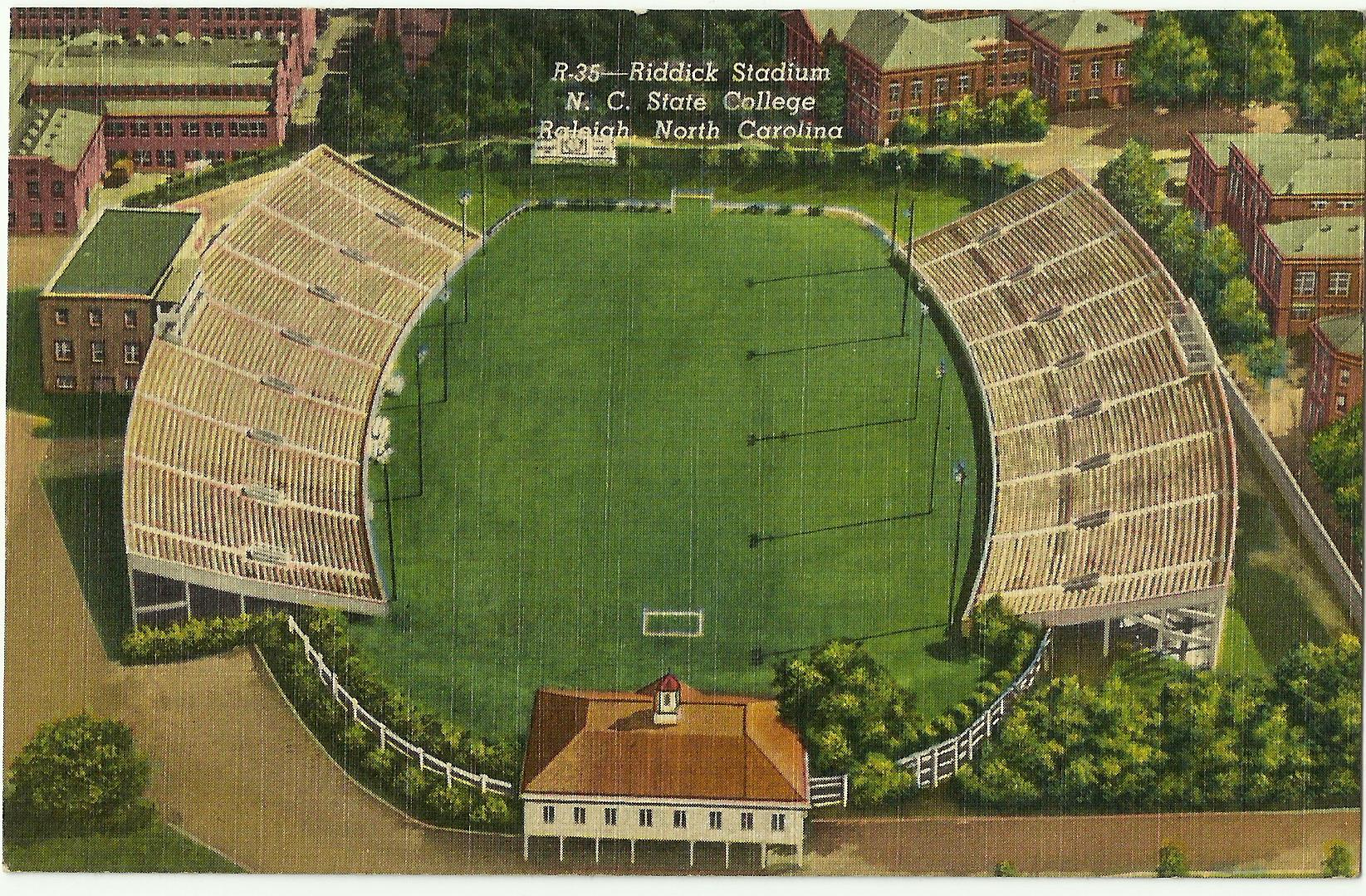
- Interactive map of Riddick Stadium
- Location: Raleigh, North Carolina
- Owner: North Carolina State University
- Operator: North Carolina State University
- Capacity: 23,000
- Surface: Grass

Construction
- Opened: 1907
- Closed: 1965
- Demolished: 2005

Tenant
- North Carolina State Wolfpack (NCAA) (1907–1965)

Riddick Stadium (opened 1907, closed 1965) was a college football stadium in Raleigh, North Carolina, and home to the North Carolina State University Wolfpack football team. When the stadium was first opened, it was referred to as New Athletic Park. Later it was named Riddick Field and then Riddick Stadium, after W. C. Riddick, N.C. State football coach during the 1898 and 1899 seasons. The Wolfpack baseball team also played its home games in the stadium prior to moving to Doak Field.

Prior to moving to the Riddick site, the Wolfpack had played their games at Athletic Park (now Pullen Park) and at the North Carolina State Fairgrounds.

The stadium initially had only wooden bleachers on the sidelines, but over the years concrete bleachers were built and a fieldhouse was erected behind the south end zone. The NC State Wolfpack defeated Florida State 3-0 in the final game ever played in Riddick Stadium on November 13, 1965.

It was one of the smallest stadiums in the country; it never seated more than 23,000 people, and never had more than 14,000 permanent seats. By the 1950s, it was at the end of its useful life, and the Wolfpack were often forced to play more games on the road than at home.

The stadium was partially demolished in 1968, three years after the opening of its replacement, Carter Stadium (now Carter-Finley Stadium). The east stands and the field were replaced by a parking lot, and the field house became the campus police station. The west stands remained and served a number of functions through the years, including a residence hall in the 1940s and the home of the University Planning office until their demolition in the summer of 2005. The former field house, the last remaining remnant of the stadium, was demolished in March 2013. SAS Hall, the new mathematics and statistics building, occupies the former site.
