= Eddie McLane =

American sports coach (1899–1980)

Biographical details
- Born: August 9, 1899; Pinckard, Alabama, U.S.
- Died: June 22, 1980 (aged 80); Ruston, Louisiana, U.S.

Playing career

Football
- c. 1920: Howard (AL)

Baseball
- c. 1920: Howard (AL)

Coaching career (HC unless noted)
- 1924–1926: Anniston HS (AL)
- 1927–1928: Howard (AL) (assistant)
- 1929–1933: Howard (AL)
- 1934–1938: Louisiana Tech

Basketball
- 1927–1931: Howard (AL)
- 1932–1934: Howard (AL)
- 1934–1936: Louisiana Tech

Baseball
- 1928–1929: Howard (AL)
- 1932: Howard (AL)
- 1934–1937: Louisiana Tech

Administrative career (AD unless noted)
- 1929–1934: Howard (AL)
- 1939: Louisiana Tech

Head coaching record
- Overall: 55–38–10 (college football); 64–84 (college basketball)

Accomplishments and honors

Championships
- Football; Dixie (1933)

Lovick Pierce "Eddie" McLane (August 9, 1899 – June 22, 1980) was an American football, basketball, and baseball coach at Anniston High School, Samford University (then named Howard College), and Louisiana Tech University. All three schools where McLane coached are nicknamed the Bulldogs. In McLane's final football season at Samford in 1933, his Bulldogs were Dixie Conference champions. McLane died on June 22, 1980, in Ruston, Louisiana.

== Head coaching record ==
=== College football ===
Year	Team	Overall	Conference	Standing	Bowl/playoffs
Howard Bulldogs (Southern Intercollegiate Athletic Association) (1929–1930)
1929	Howard	5–4–2	3–3–2	T–16th	
1930	Howard	5–5	2–3	T–17th	
Howard Bulldogs (Dixie Conference / Southern Intercollegiate Athletic Association) (1931)
1931	Howard	8–2–2	3–1–1 / 3–1–1	3rd / T–7th	
Howard Bulldogs (Dixie Conference) (1932)
1932	Howard	3–7	2–4	8th	
Howard Bulldogs (Dixie Conference / Southern Intercollegiate Athletic Association) (1933)
1933	Howard	7–1–2	4–0–1 / 5–0	1st / 2nd	
Howard:		28–19–6	16–11–4		
Louisiana Tech Bulldogs (Southern Intercollegiate Athletic Association) (1934–1938)
1934	Louisiana Tech	4–6	0–5	32nd	
1935	Louisiana Tech	8–1	7–1	7th	
1936	Louisiana Tech	6–2–1	4–1–1	T–8th	
1937	Louisiana Tech	6–3–2	3–1–2	T–8th	
1938	Louisiana Tech	3–7–1	2–4	T–20th	
Louisiana Tech:		27–19–4	16–12–3		
Total:		55–38–10			
National championship Conference title Conference division title or championship game berth
