= Pat Browne (American football) =

American football player and coach

Playing career
- 1920–1923: Spring Hill
- 1925–1927: Tulane
- Positions: End, fullback, tackle

Coaching career (HC unless noted)
- 1931–1932: Spring Hill

Head coaching record
- Overall: 3–13

Patrick W. Browne was an American college football player and coach. He served as the head football coach at Spring Hill College in Mobile, Alabama from 1931 to 1932. Browne attended Spring Hill, where the played football, basketball, and baseball, and was captain of the 1923 Spring Hill Badgers football team as a senior. He then played football at Tulane University under coaches Clark Shaughnessy and Bernie Bierman, captaining the 1927 Tulane Green Wave football team.

== Head coaching record ==
Year	Team	Overall	Conference	Standing	Bowl/playoffs
Spring Hill Badgers (Dixie Conference) (1931–1932)
1931	Spring Hill	3–6	0–3	T–8h	
1932	Spring Hill	0–7	0–5	9th	
Spring Hill:		3–13	0–8		
Total:		3–13			
