= C. V. Money =

American football, basketball, and baseball coach

- Money pictured in Thoroughbred 1933, Louisville yearbook

Biographical details
- Born: February 21, 1901; Jay County, Indiana, U.S.
- Died: March 19, 1977 (aged 76); Marquette, Michigan, U.S.

Coaching career (HC unless noted)

Football
- 1927–1931: Hanover
- 1932: Louisville
- 1936–1939: Shurtleff
- 1940–1941: Ferris Institute
- 1947–1955: Northern Michigan

Basketball
- 1927–1932: Hanover
- 1932–1936: Louisville
- 1940–1942: Ferris Institute
- 1942–1947: Valley City State
- 1947–1956: Northern Michigan

Baseball
- 1933–1936: Louisville

Administrative career (AD unless noted)
- 1932–1936: Louisville
- 1942–1947: Valley City State
- ?–1958: Northern Michigan

Head coaching record
- Overall: 49–81–12 (football); 180–164 (basketball); 18–15 (baseball)

Cloyd V. "Big Red" Money (February 21, 1901 – March 19, 1977) was an American football, basketball, and baseball coach and college athletics administrator. He served as the head football coach at Hanover College (1927–1931), the University of Louisville (1932), Shurtleff College (1936–1939), Ferris Institute—now known as Ferris State University (1940–1941), and Northern Michigan University (1947–1955). Money was also the head basketball coach at Hanover (1927–1932), Louisville (1932–1936), Ferris Institute (1940–1942), and Northern Michigan (1947–1956), amassing a career college basketball record of 180–164. In addition, he coached baseball at Louisville from 1933 to 1936, tallying a mark of 18–15.

== Early life and education ==
A native of Jay County, Indiana, Money was graduated from high school in Union City, Indiana. He lettered in football, basketball, and baseball at Ohio Northern University and earned a master's degree from Indiana University Bloomington.

== Coaching career ==
Money was the head football coach at the University of Louisville in 1932 and the school's basketball coach from 1932 to 1936. He was largely unsuccessful in football, failing to win any of the nine games he coached. He was a more successful basketball coach, amassing a 42–40 record in four seasons. From 1940 to 1941, he moved to Ferris Institute to coach football, compiling a 2–11–1 record there.

== Death ==
Money died on March 19, 1977, in Marquette, Michigan.

== Head coaching record ==
=== Football ===
Year	Team	Overall	Conference	Standing	Bowl/playoffs
Hanover Panthers (Indiana Intercollegiate Conference) (1927–1931)
1927	Hanover	1–6–1			
1928	Hanover	3–4			
1929	Hanover	2–3–1			
1930	Hanover	1–4–2			
1931	Hanover	1–7–1	0–6–1	T–14th	
Hanover:		8–24–5			
Louisville Cardinals (Southern Intercollegiate Athletic Association) (1932)
1932	Louisville	0–9	0–5	27th	
Louisville:		0–9	0–5		
Shurtleff Pioneers (Illinois Intercollegiate Athletic Conference) (1936–1937)
1936	Shurtleff	0–4	0–1	20th	
1937	Shurtleff	1–5	1–1	T–11th	
Shurtleff Pioneers () (1938–1939)
1938	Shurtleff	4–2			
1939	Shurtleff	4–2			
Shurtleff:		9–13			
Ferris Institute Bulldogs (Michigan-Ontario Collegiate Conference) (1940–1941)
1940	Ferris Institute	1–7	0–4	5th	
1941	Ferris Institute	1–4–1			
Ferris Institute:		2–11–1			
Northern Michigan Wildcats () (1947–1955)
1947	Northern Michigan	1–4–2			
1948	Northern Michigan	3–3–1			
1949	Northern Michigan	6–1			
1950	Northern Michigan	5–3			
1951	Northern Michigan	2–2–1			
1952	Northern Michigan	5–1			
1953	Northern Michigan	5–1–1			
1954	Northern Michigan	4–2–1			
1955	Northern Michigan	0–7			
Northern Michigan:		30–24–6			
Total:		49–81–12			
