= 1932 Miami Hurricanes football team =

American college football season

1932 Miami Hurricanes football

Festival of Palms Bowl, W 7–0 vs. Manhattan
- Conference: Southern Intercollegiate Athletic Association
- Record: 4–3–1 (0–2–1 SIAA)
- Head coach: Tom McCann (2nd season)
- Home stadium: Moore Park

1932 Southern Intercollegiate Athletic Association football standings
	Conf.					Overall
Team	W		L		T	W		L		T
Western Kentucky State Teachers $	6	–	0	–	0	7	–	1	–	0
Furman	5	–	0	–	0	8	–	1	–	0
Southwestern (TN)	3	–	0	–	0	4	–	6	–	0
Rollins	2	–	0	–	0	6	–	0	–	1
Loyola (LA)	2	–	0	–	0	6	–	4	–	1
Centenary	1	–	0	–	0	8	–	0	–	1
Louisiana Normal	4	–	1	–	0	7	–	1	–	0
Centre	4	–	1	–	0	6	–	3	–	0
Mississippi College	4	–	1	–	0	4	–	4	–	0
Presbyterian	3	–	1	–	1	5	–	2	–	1
Mercer	5	–	2	–	0	6	–	2	–	0
Murray State	3	–	2	–	1	4	–	2	–	3
Georgetown (KY)	3	–	2	–	0	4	–	5	–	0
Eastern Kentucky	1	–	1	–	1	2	–	1	–	2
Mississippi State Teachers	3	–	3	–	0	5	–	4	–	0
Louisiana Tech	3	–	3	–	0	4	–	4	–	0
The Citadel	2	–	2	–	0	4	–	5	–	0
Middle Tennessee State Teachers	2	–	3	–	0	4	–	6	–	0
Newberry	1	–	2	–	2	2	–	3	–	3
Millsaps	1	–	3	–	0	4	–	5	–	0
SW Louisiana	1	–	3	–	0	3	–	4	–	0
Transylvania	1	–	3	–	1	3	–	5	–	1
Wofford	1	–	3	–	1	3	–	6	–	1
Louisiana College	1	–	4	–	1	2	–	4	–	1
Chattanooga	1	–	4	–	0	3	–	6	–	0
Miami (FL)	0	–	2	–	1	4	–	3	–	1
Louisville	0	–	5	–	0	0	–	9	–	0
Erskine	0	–	6	–	0	1	–	9	–	0
Union (TN)	0	–	6	–	1	0	–	8	–	1
$ – Conference champion

The 1932 Miami Hurricanes football team represented the University of Miami as a member of the Southern Intercollegiate Athletic Association (SIAA) in the 1932 college football season. The Hurricanes played their home games at Moore Park in Miami, Florida. Led by second-year head coach Tom McCann, the Hurricanes finished their season 4–3–1 and were invited to the first annual edition of the Festival of Palms Bowl, where they defeated the Manhattan Jaspers by a score of 7–0.

== Schedule ==
Date	Opponent	Site	Result	Attendance	Source
October 14	at William & Mary Norfolk Division*	Moore Park; Miami, FL	W 6–2	10,000	
October 28	Piedmont*	Moore Park; Miami, FL	W 30–6		
November 4	Georgia State College*	Moore Park; Miami, FL	L 6–19		
November 10	at Rollins	Tinker Field; Orlando, FL	L 0–6		
November 18	Murray State	Moore Park; Miami, FL	T 0–0		
November 24	Southeastern Louisiana*	Moore Park; Miami, FL	W 7–0		
December 3	Middle Tennessee State Teachers	Moore Park; Miami, FL	L 0–7		
January 2	Manhattan*	Moore Park; Miami, FL (Festival of Palms Bowl)	W 7–0	7,500	
*Non-conference game
