= 1932 Centenary Gentlemen football team =

American college football season

1932 Centenary Gentlemen football
- Conference: Southern Intercollegiate Athletic Association
- Record: 8–0–1 (1–0 SIAA)
- Head coach: Homer Norton (7th season)
- Home stadium: Centenary Stadium

1932 Southern Intercollegiate Athletic Association football standings
	Conf.					Overall
Team	W		L		T	W		L		T
Western Kentucky State Teachers $	6	–	0	–	0	7	–	1	–	0
Furman	5	–	0	–	0	8	–	1	–	0
Southwestern (TN)	3	–	0	–	0	4	–	6	–	0
Rollins	2	–	0	–	0	6	–	0	–	1
Loyola (LA)	2	–	0	–	0	6	–	4	–	1
Centenary	1	–	0	–	0	8	–	0	–	1
Louisiana Normal	4	–	1	–	0	7	–	1	–	0
Centre	4	–	1	–	0	6	–	3	–	0
Mississippi College	4	–	1	–	0	4	–	4	–	0
Presbyterian	3	–	1	–	1	5	–	2	–	1
Mercer	5	–	2	–	0	6	–	2	–	0
Murray State	3	–	2	–	1	4	–	2	–	3
Georgetown (KY)	3	–	2	–	0	4	–	5	–	0
Eastern Kentucky	1	–	1	–	1	2	–	1	–	2
Mississippi State Teachers	3	–	3	–	0	5	–	4	–	0
Louisiana Tech	3	–	3	–	0	4	–	4	–	0
The Citadel	2	–	2	–	0	4	–	5	–	0
Middle Tennessee State Teachers	2	–	3	–	0	4	–	6	–	0
Newberry	1	–	2	–	2	2	–	3	–	3
Millsaps	1	–	3	–	0	4	–	5	–	0
SW Louisiana	1	–	3	–	0	3	–	4	–	0
Transylvania	1	–	3	–	1	3	–	5	–	1
Wofford	1	–	3	–	1	3	–	6	–	1
Louisiana College	1	–	4	–	1	2	–	4	–	1
Chattanooga	1	–	4	–	0	3	–	6	–	0
Miami (FL)	0	–	2	–	1	4	–	3	–	1
Louisville	0	–	5	–	0	0	–	9	–	0
Erskine	0	–	6	–	0	1	–	9	–	0
Union (TN)	0	–	6	–	1	0	–	8	–	1
$ – Conference champion

The 1932 Centenary Gentlemen football team represented the Centenary College of Louisiana during the 1932 college football season.

== Schedule ==
Date	Time	Opponent	Site	Result	Attendance	Source
September 24	2:30 p.m.	Henderson State*	Centenary Stadium; Shreveport, LA	W 41–0	5,000	
October 1		at Texas*	War Memorial Stadium; Austin, TX	W 13–6		
October 8		Louisiana Normal	Centenary Stadium; Shreveport, LA	W 41–7	5,000	
October 15		Ole Miss*	Centenary Stadium; Shreveport, LA	W 13–6	5,000	
October 22		at SMU*	Fair Park Stadium; Dallas, TX	W 18–7		
October 29		Texas A&M*	State Fair Stadium; Shreveport, LA	W 7–0		
November 5		Southeastern Oklahoma State*	Centenary Stadium; Shreveport, LA	W 44–0	4,500	
November 12		LSU*	Centenary Stadium; Shreveport, LA	W 6–0		
November 26		Arkansas*	Centenary Stadium; Shreveport, LA	T 0–0		
*Non-conference game; All times are in Central time
