= 1932 Centre Colonels football team =

American college football season

1932 Centre Colonels football
- Conference: Dixie Conference, Southern Intercollegiate Athletic Association
- Record: 6–3 (2–1 Dixie, 4–1 SIAA)
- Head coach: Ed Kubale (4th season)
- Home stadium: Cheek Field

1932 Dixie Conference football standings
	Conf.					Overall
Team	W		L		T	W		L		T
Mercer	3	–	0	–	0	6	–	2	–	0
Birmingham–Southern $	5	–	1	–	0	5	–	3	–	0
Centre	2	–	1	–	0	6	–	3	–	0
Mississippi College	2	–	1	–	0	3	–	4	–	1
Southwestern (TN)	2	–	2	–	0	4	–	6	–	0
Millsaps	2	–	3	–	0	4	–	5	–	0
Chattanooga	2	–	3	–	0	3	–	6	–	0
Howard (AL)	2	–	4	–	0	3	–	7	–	0
Spring Hill	0	–	5	–	0	0	–	7	–	0
$ – Conference champion

1932 Southern Intercollegiate Athletic Association football standings
	Conf.					Overall
Team	W		L		T	W		L		T
Western Kentucky State Teachers $	6	–	0	–	0	7	–	1	–	0
Furman	5	–	0	–	0	8	–	1	–	0
Southwestern (TN)	3	–	0	–	0	4	–	6	–	0
Rollins	2	–	0	–	0	6	–	0	–	1
Loyola (LA)	2	–	0	–	0	6	–	4	–	1
Centenary	1	–	0	–	0	8	–	0	–	1
Louisiana Normal	4	–	1	–	0	7	–	1	–	0
Centre	4	–	1	–	0	6	–	3	–	0
Mississippi College	4	–	1	–	0	4	–	4	–	0
Presbyterian	3	–	1	–	1	5	–	2	–	1
Mercer	5	–	2	–	0	6	–	2	–	0
Murray State	3	–	2	–	1	4	–	2	–	3
Georgetown (KY)	3	–	2	–	0	4	–	5	–	0
Eastern Kentucky	1	–	1	–	1	2	–	1	–	2
Mississippi State Teachers	3	–	3	–	0	5	–	4	–	0
Louisiana Tech	3	–	3	–	0	4	–	4	–	0
The Citadel	2	–	2	–	0	4	–	5	–	0
Middle Tennessee State Teachers	2	–	3	–	0	4	–	6	–	0
Newberry	1	–	2	–	2	2	–	3	–	3
Millsaps	1	–	3	–	0	4	–	5	–	0
SW Louisiana	1	–	3	–	0	3	–	4	–	0
Transylvania	1	–	3	–	1	3	–	5	–	1
Wofford	1	–	3	–	1	3	–	6	–	1
Louisiana College	1	–	4	–	1	2	–	4	–	1
Chattanooga	1	–	4	–	0	3	–	6	–	0
Miami (FL)	0	–	2	–	1	4	–	3	–	1
Louisville	0	–	5	–	0	0	–	9	–	0
Erskine	0	–	6	–	0	1	–	9	–	0
Union (TN)	0	–	6	–	1	0	–	8	–	1
$ – Conference champion

The 1932 Centre Colonels football team represented Centre College as a member of the Dixie Conference and the Southern Intercollegiate Athletic Association (SIAA) in the 1932 college football season. Led by fourth-year head coach Ed Kubale, the Colonels compiled an overall record of 6–3 and with a mark of 2–1 in Dixie Conference play and 4–1 against SIAA competition. The team played home games at Cheek Field in Danville, Kentucky.

== Schedule ==
Date	Time	Opponent	Site	Result	Attendance	Source
September 24	3:00 p.m.	at Murray State	Cheek Field; Danville, KY	W 7–0	4,000	
September 30	7:15 p.m.	at Xavier*	Corcoran Field; Cincinnati, OH	L 0–7	7,773	
October 8	2:30 p.m.	Transylvania	Cheek Field; Danville, KY	W 21–7		
October 12	1:00 p.m.	at Boston College*	Alumni Field; Chestnut Hill, MA	L 0–6	14,000–16,000	
October 21	7:45 p.m.	Birmingham–Southern	Legion Field; Birmingham, AL	W 2–0	6,000	
November 5	2:00 p.m.	Mercer^{†}	Cheek Field; Danville, KY	L 0–8	5,000	
November 12	1:15 p.m.	at John Carroll*	Cleveland Stadium; Cleveland, OH	W 13–7	6,000	
November 19		Georgetown (KY)	Cheek Field; Danville, KY	W 21–0	1,000	
November 24	2:00 p.m.	at Chattanooga	Chamberlain Field; Chattanooga, TN	W 20–6	2,500	
*Non-conference game; ^{†}Homecoming; All times are in Central time
