= 1932 Louisiana Normal Demons football team =

American college football season

1932 Louisiana Normal Demons football
- Conference: Southern Intercollegiate Athletic Association
- Record: 7–1 (4–1 SIAA)
- Head coach: H. Lee Prather (19th season)
- Home stadium: Demon Field

1932 Southern Intercollegiate Athletic Association football standings
	Conf.					Overall
Team	W		L		T	W		L		T
Western Kentucky State Teachers $	6	–	0	–	0	7	–	1	–	0
Furman	5	–	0	–	0	8	–	1	–	0
Southwestern (TN)	3	–	0	–	0	4	–	6	–	0
Rollins	2	–	0	–	0	6	–	0	–	1
Loyola (LA)	2	–	0	–	0	6	–	4	–	1
Centenary	1	–	0	–	0	8	–	0	–	1
Louisiana Normal	4	–	1	–	0	7	–	1	–	0
Centre	4	–	1	–	0	6	–	3	–	0
Mississippi College	4	–	1	–	0	4	–	4	–	0
Presbyterian	3	–	1	–	1	5	–	2	–	1
Mercer	5	–	2	–	0	6	–	2	–	0
Murray State	3	–	2	–	1	4	–	2	–	3
Georgetown (KY)	3	–	2	–	0	4	–	5	–	0
Eastern Kentucky	1	–	1	–	1	2	–	1	–	2
Mississippi State Teachers	3	–	3	–	0	5	–	4	–	0
Louisiana Tech	3	–	3	–	0	4	–	4	–	0
The Citadel	2	–	2	–	0	4	–	5	–	0
Middle Tennessee State Teachers	2	–	3	–	0	4	–	6	–	0
Newberry	1	–	2	–	2	2	–	3	–	3
Millsaps	1	–	3	–	0	4	–	5	–	0
SW Louisiana	1	–	3	–	0	3	–	4	–	0
Transylvania	1	–	3	–	1	3	–	5	–	1
Wofford	1	–	3	–	1	3	–	6	–	1
Louisiana College	1	–	4	–	1	2	–	4	–	1
Chattanooga	1	–	4	–	0	3	–	6	–	0
Miami (FL)	0	–	2	–	1	4	–	3	–	1
Louisville	0	–	5	–	0	0	–	9	–	0
Erskine	0	–	6	–	0	1	–	9	–	0
Union (TN)	0	–	6	–	1	0	–	8	–	1
$ – Conference champion

The 1932 Louisiana Normal Demons football team represented Louisiana State Normal College (now known as Northwestern State University) as a member the Southern Intercollegiate Athletic Association (SIAA) during the 1932 college football season. Led by 19th-year head coach H. Lee Prather, the Demons compiled an overall record of 7–1 with a mark of 4–1 in conference play.

== Schedule ==
Date	Opponent	Site	Result	Attendance	Source
September 30	East Texas State*	Demon Field; Natchitoches, LA	W 19–6		
October 8	at Centenary	Centenary Stadium; Shreveport, LA	L 7–41	5,000	
October 21	Lon Morris*	Demon Field; Natchitoches, LA	W 19–0		
October 28	Louisiana Tech	Demon Field; Natchitoches, LA (rivalry)	W 33–0		
November 4	at Stephen F. Austin*	Birdwell Field; Nacogdoches, TX (rivalry)	W 39–0		
November 12	Mississippi State Teachers	Demon Field; Natchitoches, LA	W 31–6		
November 24	at Southwestern Louisiana	Campus Athletic Field; Lafayette, LA	W 8–0		
December 3	at Louisiana College	Alumni Field; Pineville, LA	W 6–0		
*Non-conference game
