= 1932 The Citadel Bulldogs football team =

American college football season

1932 The Citadel Bulldogs football
- Conference: Southern Intercollegiate Athletic Association
- Record: 4–5 (2–2 SIAA)
- Head coach: Tatum Gressette (1st season)
- Home stadium: Johnson Hagood Stadium

1932 Southern Intercollegiate Athletic Association football standings
	Conf.					Overall
Team	W		L		T	W		L		T
Western Kentucky State Teachers $	6	–	0	–	0	7	–	1	–	0
Furman	5	–	0	–	0	8	–	1	–	0
Southwestern (TN)	3	–	0	–	0	4	–	6	–	0
Rollins	2	–	0	–	0	6	–	0	–	1
Loyola (LA)	2	–	0	–	0	6	–	4	–	1
Centenary	1	–	0	–	0	8	–	0	–	1
Louisiana Normal	4	–	1	–	0	7	–	1	–	0
Centre	4	–	1	–	0	6	–	3	–	0
Mississippi College	4	–	1	–	0	4	–	4	–	0
Presbyterian	3	–	1	–	1	5	–	2	–	1
Mercer	5	–	2	–	0	6	–	2	–	0
Murray State	3	–	2	–	1	4	–	2	–	3
Georgetown (KY)	3	–	2	–	0	4	–	5	–	0
Eastern Kentucky	1	–	1	–	1	2	–	1	–	2
Mississippi State Teachers	3	–	3	–	0	5	–	4	–	0
Louisiana Tech	3	–	3	–	0	4	–	4	–	0
The Citadel	2	–	2	–	0	4	–	5	–	0
Middle Tennessee State Teachers	2	–	3	–	0	4	–	6	–	0
Newberry	1	–	2	–	2	2	–	3	–	3
Millsaps	1	–	3	–	0	4	–	5	–	0
SW Louisiana	1	–	3	–	0	3	–	4	–	0
Transylvania	1	–	3	–	1	3	–	5	–	1
Wofford	1	–	3	–	1	3	–	6	–	1
Louisiana College	1	–	4	–	1	2	–	4	–	1
Chattanooga	1	–	4	–	0	3	–	6	–	0
Miami (FL)	0	–	2	–	1	4	–	3	–	1
Louisville	0	–	5	–	0	0	–	9	–	0
Erskine	0	–	6	–	0	1	–	9	–	0
Union (TN)	0	–	6	–	1	0	–	8	–	1
$ – Conference champion

The 1932 The Citadel Bulldogs football team represented The Citadel, The Military College of South Carolina in the 1932 college football season. Tatum Gressette served as head coach for the first season. The Bulldogs played as members of the Southern Intercollegiate Athletic Association and played home games at Johnson Hagood Stadium.

== Schedule ==
Date	Opponent	Site	Result	Attendance	Source
September 24	Erskine	Johnson Hagood Stadium; Charleston, SC	W 19–0	2,000	
October 8	VMI*	Johnson Hagood Stadium; Charleston, SC (rivalry)	W 12–6		
October 15	at Florida*	Florida Field; Gainesville, FL	L 7–27	6,500	
October 22	Davidson*	Johnson Hagood Stadium; Charleston, SC	W 7–6		
October 27	vs. Furman	County Fairgrounds; Orangeburg, SC (rivalry)	L 0–20		
November 5	Clemson*	Johnson Hagood Stadium; Charleston, SC	L 6–18	3,000	
November 11	Presbyterian	Johnson Hagood Stadium; Charleston, SC	L 0–27		
November 19	at South Carolina*	Melton Field; Columbia, SC	L 0–19	4,000	
November 24	at Wofford	Snyder Field; Spartanburg, SC (rivalry)	W 13–0		
*Non-conference game
