= 1932 Rollins Tars football team =

American college football season

1932 Rollins Tars football
- Conference: Southern Intercollegiate Athletic Association
- Record: 6–0–1 (2–0 SIAA)
- Head coach: Jack McDowall (4th season)
- Home stadium: Tinker Field

1932 Southern Intercollegiate Athletic Association football standings
	Conf.					Overall
Team	W		L		T	W		L		T
Western Kentucky State Teachers $	6	–	0	–	0	7	–	1	–	0
Furman	5	–	0	–	0	8	–	1	–	0
Southwestern (TN)	3	–	0	–	0	4	–	6	–	0
Rollins	2	–	0	–	0	6	–	0	–	1
Loyola (LA)	2	–	0	–	0	6	–	4	–	1
Centenary	1	–	0	–	0	8	–	0	–	1
Louisiana Normal	4	–	1	–	0	7	–	1	–	0
Centre	4	–	1	–	0	6	–	3	–	0
Mississippi College	4	–	1	–	0	4	–	4	–	0
Presbyterian	3	–	1	–	1	5	–	2	–	1
Mercer	5	–	2	–	0	6	–	2	–	0
Murray State	3	–	2	–	1	4	–	2	–	3
Georgetown (KY)	3	–	2	–	0	4	–	5	–	0
Eastern Kentucky	1	–	1	–	1	2	–	1	–	2
Mississippi State Teachers	3	–	3	–	0	5	–	4	–	0
Louisiana Tech	3	–	3	–	0	4	–	4	–	0
The Citadel	2	–	2	–	0	4	–	5	–	0
Middle Tennessee State Teachers	2	–	3	–	0	4	–	6	–	0
Newberry	1	–	2	–	2	2	–	3	–	3
Millsaps	1	–	3	–	0	4	–	5	–	0
SW Louisiana	1	–	3	–	0	3	–	4	–	0
Transylvania	1	–	3	–	1	3	–	5	–	1
Wofford	1	–	3	–	1	3	–	6	–	1
Louisiana College	1	–	4	–	1	2	–	4	–	1
Chattanooga	1	–	4	–	0	3	–	6	–	0
Miami (FL)	0	–	2	–	1	4	–	3	–	1
Louisville	0	–	5	–	0	0	–	9	–	0
Erskine	0	–	6	–	0	1	–	9	–	0
Union (TN)	0	–	6	–	1	0	–	8	–	1
$ – Conference champion

The 1932 Rollins Tars football team was an American football team that represented Rollins College of Orlando, Florida, as a member of the Southern Intercollegiate Athletic Association (SIAA) during the 1932 college football season. In their fourth year under head coach Jack McDowall, the Tars compiled a 6–0–1 record (2–0 against SIAA opponents) and outscored opponents by a total of 91 to 39. It was the first undefeated season in Rollins football history. The victory over Miami (FL) was also the first for a Rollins team.

Halfback Will Rogers, described by The Orlando Evening Sentinel as a "150-pound streak", was the star on offense. At the banquet following the season, Rogers' jersey bearing number 43 was placed in the trophy room "to be used in the last home game each season by the most deserving senior on the squad."

Other key players included end Danny Contini who was called "one of the smartest players" ever to play for Rollins and brilliant on defense. Center "Flop" Morris and quarterback Ray "Heimie" Miller played every minute of every game for the 1932 Rolins team.

Robert K. Evans was also a coach. MacDowall and Evans both played football at North Carolina.

The team played its home games at Tinker Field in Orlando.

== Schedule ==
Date	Opponent	Site	Result	Attendance	Source
October 21	at Jacksonville State*	Fair Park; Anniston, AL	T 7–7		
October 29	Florida "B" team*	Tinker Field; Orlando, FL	W 20–6	1,500	
November 5	South Georgia Teachers*	Tinker Field; Orlando, FL	W 12–0		
November 10	Miami (FL)	Tinker Field; Orlando, FL	W 6–0		
November 18	Cumberland (TN)*	Tinker Field; Orlando, FL	W 19–13		
November 24	Newberry	Tinker Field; Orlando, FL	W 7–0		
December 2	at South Georgia State*	Douglas, GA	W 20–13		
*Non-conference game
