= 1932 North Dakota Agricultural Bison football team =

American college football season

1932 North Dakota Agricultural Bison football

NCC champion
- Conference: North Central Conference
- Record: 7–2 (4–0 NCC)
- Head coach: Casey Finnegan (4th season)
- Captain: Walter Schoenfelder
- Home stadium: Dacotah Field

1932 North Central Conference football standings
	Conf.					Overall
Team	W		L		T	W		L		T
North Dakota Agricultural $	4	–	0	–	0	7	–	2	–	0
North Dakota	2	–	1	–	0	7	–	1	–	0
South Dakota	1	–	1	–	1	4	–	5	–	1
South Dakota State	1	–	2	–	1	2	–	5	–	1
Morningside	0	–	4	–	0	2	–	6	–	0
$ – Conference champion

The 1932 North Dakota Agricultural Bison football team was an American football team that represented North Dakota Agricultural College (now known as North Dakota State University) in the North Central Conference (NCC) during the 1932 college football season. In its fourth season under head coach Casey Finnegan, the team compiled a 7–2 record (4–0 against NCC opponents) and won the NCC championship. The team played its home games at Dacotah Field in Fargo, North Dakota.

== Schedule ==
Date	Opponent	Site	Result	Attendance	Source
September 23	Concordia (MN)*	Dacotah Field; Fargo, ND	W 6–0		
September 30	South Dakota	Dacotah Field; Fargo, ND	W 18–8		
October 8	at South Dakota State	State Field; Brookings, SD (rivalry)	W 12–6		
October 14	Oklahoma City*	Dacotah Field; Fargo, ND	W 27–7		
October 22	North Dakota	Dacotah Field; Fargo, ND (rivalry)	W 7–6	6,200	
October 29	Moorhead State*	Dacotah Field; Fargo, ND	W 24–0		
November 4	at George Washington*	Griffith Stadium; Washington, DC	L 0–20	12,000	
November 12	at Army*	Michie Stadium; West Point, NY	L 0–52	10,000	
November 24	at Morningside	Sioux City, IA	W 20–0	2,500	
*Non-conference game
