= 1932 Louisiana Tech Bulldogs football team =

American college football season

1932 Louisiana Tech Bulldogs football
- Conference: Southern Intercollegiate Athletic Association
- Record: 4–4 (3–3 SIAA)
- Head coach: George Bohler (3rd season)
- Captain: J. B. Durham
- Home stadium: Tech Stadium

1932 Southern Intercollegiate Athletic Association football standings
	Conf.					Overall
Team	W		L		T	W		L		T
Western Kentucky State Teachers $	6	–	0	–	0	7	–	1	–	0
Furman	5	–	0	–	0	8	–	1	–	0
Southwestern (TN)	3	–	0	–	0	4	–	6	–	0
Rollins	2	–	0	–	0	6	–	0	–	1
Loyola (LA)	2	–	0	–	0	6	–	4	–	1
Centenary	1	–	0	–	0	8	–	0	–	1
Louisiana Normal	4	–	1	–	0	7	–	1	–	0
Centre	4	–	1	–	0	6	–	3	–	0
Mississippi College	4	–	1	–	0	4	–	4	–	0
Presbyterian	3	–	1	–	1	5	–	2	–	1
Mercer	5	–	2	–	0	6	–	2	–	0
Murray State	3	–	2	–	1	4	–	2	–	3
Georgetown (KY)	3	–	2	–	0	4	–	5	–	0
Eastern Kentucky	1	–	1	–	1	2	–	1	–	2
Mississippi State Teachers	3	–	3	–	0	5	–	4	–	0
Louisiana Tech	3	–	3	–	0	4	–	4	–	0
The Citadel	2	–	2	–	0	4	–	5	–	0
Middle Tennessee State Teachers	2	–	3	–	0	4	–	6	–	0
Newberry	1	–	2	–	2	2	–	3	–	3
Millsaps	1	–	3	–	0	4	–	5	–	0
SW Louisiana	1	–	3	–	0	3	–	4	–	0
Transylvania	1	–	3	–	1	3	–	5	–	1
Wofford	1	–	3	–	1	3	–	6	–	1
Louisiana College	1	–	4	–	1	2	–	4	–	1
Chattanooga	1	–	4	–	0	3	–	6	–	0
Miami (FL)	0	–	2	–	1	4	–	3	–	1
Louisville	0	–	5	–	0	0	–	9	–	0
Erskine	0	–	6	–	0	1	–	9	–	0
Union (TN)	0	–	6	–	1	0	–	8	–	1
$ – Conference champion

The 1932 Louisiana Tech Bulldogs football team was an American football team that represented the Louisiana Polytechnic Institute (now known as Louisiana Tech University) as a member of the Southern Intercollegiate Athletic Association during the 1932 college football season. In their third year under head coach George Bohler, the team compiled a 3–3 record.

== Schedule ==
Date	Opponent	Site	Result	Source
October 1	Copiah–Lincoln*	Tech Stadium; Ruston, LA	L 0–2	
October 8	Union (TN)	Tech Stadium; Ruston, LA	W 46–7	
October 14	Delta State*	Tech Stadium; Ruston, LA	W 20–0	
October 21	at Southwestern Louisiana	Campus Athletic Field; Lafayette, LA (rivalry)	W 15–0	
October 28	at Louisiana Normal	Demon Field; Natchitoches, LA (rivalry)	L 0–33	
November 5	Millsaps^{†}	Tech Stadium; Ruston, LA	W 19–14	
November 12	at Mississippi College	Provine Field; Clinton, MS	L 7–20	
November 19	Louisiana College	Tech Stadium; Ruston, LA	L 6–13	
*Non-conference game; ^{†}Homecoming
