= 1932 North Dakota Fighting Sioux football team =

American college football season

1932 North Dakota Fighting Sioux football
- Conference: North Central Conference
- Record: 7–1 (2–1 NCC)
- Head coach: Charles A. West (5th season)
- Home stadium: Memorial Stadium

1932 North Central Conference football standings
	Conf.					Overall
Team	W		L		T	W		L		T
North Dakota Agricultural $	4	–	0	–	0	7	–	2	–	0
North Dakota	2	–	1	–	0	7	–	1	–	0
South Dakota	1	–	1	–	1	4	–	5	–	1
South Dakota State	1	–	2	–	1	2	–	5	–	1
Morningside	0	–	4	–	0	2	–	6	–	0
$ – Conference champion

The 1932 North Dakota Fighting Sioux football team, also known as the Nodaks, was an American football team that represented the University of North Dakota in the North Central Conference (NCC) during the 1932 college football season. In their fifth year under head coach Charles A. West, the Fighting Sioux compiled a 7–1 record (2–1 against NCC opponents), finished in second place out of five teams in the NCC, and outscored opponents by a total of 153 to 26.

== Schedule ==
Date	Opponent	Site	Result	Attendance	Source
September 23	Moorhead State*	Memorial Stadium; Grand Forks, ND	W 25–0		
October 7	St. Thomas (MN)*	Memorial Stadium; Grand Forks, ND	W 27–0		
October 15	Howard (AL)*	Memorial Stadium; Grand Forks, ND	W 39–7		
October 22	at North Dakota Agricultural	Dacotah Field; Fargo, ND (rivalry)	L 6–7		
October 28	South Dakota State	Memorial Stadium; Grand Forks, ND	W 13–0		
November 5	Morningside	Memorial Stadium; Grand Forks, ND	W 12–0		
November 19	at DePaul*	Loyola Stadium; Chicago, IL	W 13–6	5,000	
November 24	at Loyola (LA)*	Loyola Stadium; New Orleans, LA	W 18–6		
*Non-conference game
