= 1932 Birmingham–Southern Panthers football team =

American college football season

1932 Birmingham–Southern Panthers football

Dixie Conference Champion
- Conference: Dixie Conference
- Record: 5–3 (5–1 Dixie)
- Head coach: Jenks Gillem (5th season)
- Home stadium: Legion Field

1932 Dixie Conference football standings
| | Conf. | | | | | Overall |
| Team | W | | L | | T | W | | L | | T |
|---|---|---|---|---|---|---|---|---|---|---|
| Mercer | 3 | – | 0 | – | 0 | 6 | – | 2 | – | 0 |
| Birmingham–Southern $ | 5 | – | 1 | – | 0 | 5 | – | 3 | – | 0 |
| Centre | 2 | – | 1 | – | 0 | 6 | – | 3 | – | 0 |
| Mississippi College | 2 | – | 1 | – | 0 | 3 | – | 4 | – | 1 |
| Southwestern (TN) | 2 | – | 2 | – | 0 | 4 | – | 6 | – | 0 |
| Millsaps | 2 | – | 3 | – | 0 | 4 | – | 5 | – | 0 |
| Chattanooga | 2 | – | 3 | – | 0 | 3 | – | 6 | – | 0 |
| Howard (AL) | 2 | – | 4 | – | 0 | 3 | – | 7 | – | 0 |
| Spring Hill | 0 | – | 5 | – | 0 | 0 | – | 7 | – | 0 |
$ – Conference champion

The 1932 Birmingham–Southern Panthers football team was an American football team that represented Birmingham–Southern College as a member of the Dixie Conference during the 1932 college football season. In their fifth season under head coach Jenks Gillem, the team compiled a 5–3 record.

The Dixie Conference championship was awarded to Birmingham-Southern, as Mercer did not contest the 5 necessary games to be eligible for the conference title.

== Schedule ==
| Date | Time | Opponent | Site | Result | Attendance | Source |
|---|---|---|---|---|---|---|
| September 23 | | at Auburn* | Cramton Bowl; Montgomery, AL | L 0–61 | | |
| September 30 | | at Loyola (LA)* | Loyola University Stadium; New Orleans, LA | L 0–13 | | |
| October 15 | | at Mississippi College | Municipal Stadium; Jackson, MS | W 6–4 | | |
| October 21 | 7:45 p.m. | Centre (KY) | Legion Field; Birmingham, AL | L 0–2 | 6,000 | |
| October 29 | | Millsaps | Legion Field; Birmingham, AL | W 13–0 | | |
| November 5 | | Southwestern (TN) | Legion Field; Birmingham, AL | W 20–6 | | |
| November 12 | | at Spring Hill | Mobile, AL | W 14–6 | | |
| November 19 | | vs. Howard (AL) | Legion Field; Birmingham, AL | W 7–0 | | |
*Non-conference game; All times are in Central time
