= 1932 Louisville Cardinals football team =

American college football season

1932 Louisville Cardinals football
- Conference: Southern Intercollegiate Athletic Association
- Record: 0–9 (0–5 SIAA)
- Head coach: C. V. Money (1st season)
- Home stadium: Parkway Field

1932 Southern Intercollegiate Athletic Association football standings
| | Conf. | | | | | Overall |
| Team | W | | L | | T | W | | L | | T |
|---|---|---|---|---|---|---|---|---|---|---|
| Western Kentucky State Teachers $ | 6 | – | 0 | – | 0 | 7 | – | 1 | – | 0 |
| Furman | 5 | – | 0 | – | 0 | 8 | – | 1 | – | 0 |
| Southwestern (TN) | 3 | – | 0 | – | 0 | 4 | – | 6 | – | 0 |
| Rollins | 2 | – | 0 | – | 0 | 6 | – | 0 | – | 1 |
| Loyola (LA) | 2 | – | 0 | – | 0 | 6 | – | 4 | – | 1 |
| Centenary | 1 | – | 0 | – | 0 | 8 | – | 0 | – | 1 |
| Louisiana Normal | 4 | – | 1 | – | 0 | 7 | – | 1 | – | 0 |
| Centre | 4 | – | 1 | – | 0 | 6 | – | 3 | – | 0 |
| Mississippi College | 4 | – | 1 | – | 0 | 4 | – | 4 | – | 0 |
| Presbyterian | 3 | – | 1 | – | 1 | 5 | – | 2 | – | 1 |
| Mercer | 5 | – | 2 | – | 0 | 6 | – | 2 | – | 0 |
| Murray State | 3 | – | 2 | – | 1 | 4 | – | 2 | – | 3 |
| Georgetown (KY) | 3 | – | 2 | – | 0 | 4 | – | 5 | – | 0 |
| Eastern Kentucky | 1 | – | 1 | – | 1 | 2 | – | 1 | – | 2 |
| Mississippi State Teachers | 3 | – | 3 | – | 0 | 5 | – | 4 | – | 0 |
| Louisiana Tech | 3 | – | 3 | – | 0 | 4 | – | 4 | – | 0 |
| The Citadel | 2 | – | 2 | – | 0 | 4 | – | 5 | – | 0 |
| Middle Tennessee State Teachers | 2 | – | 3 | – | 0 | 4 | – | 6 | – | 0 |
| Newberry | 1 | – | 2 | – | 2 | 2 | – | 3 | – | 3 |
| Millsaps | 1 | – | 3 | – | 0 | 4 | – | 5 | – | 0 |
| SW Louisiana | 1 | – | 3 | – | 0 | 3 | – | 4 | – | 0 |
| Transylvania | 1 | – | 3 | – | 1 | 3 | – | 5 | – | 1 |
| Wofford | 1 | – | 3 | – | 1 | 3 | – | 6 | – | 1 |
| Louisiana College | 1 | – | 4 | – | 1 | 2 | – | 4 | – | 1 |
| Chattanooga | 1 | – | 4 | – | 0 | 3 | – | 6 | – | 0 |
| Miami (FL) | 0 | – | 2 | – | 1 | 4 | – | 3 | – | 1 |
| Louisville | 0 | – | 5 | – | 0 | 0 | – | 9 | – | 0 |
| Erskine | 0 | – | 6 | – | 0 | 1 | – | 9 | – | 0 |
| Union (TN) | 0 | – | 6 | – | 1 | 0 | – | 8 | – | 1 |
$ – Conference champion

The 1932 Louisville Cardinals football team was an American football team that represented the University of Louisville as a member of the Southern Intercollegiate Athletic Association (SIAA) during the 1932 college football season. In their first and only season under head coach C. V. Money, the Cardinals compiled a 0–9 record.

Louisville's 1932 season was part of a 24-game losing streak dating back to October 2, 1931. The streak ended on November 18, 1933, with a 13–7 victory over Eastern Kentucky.

== Schedule ==
| Date | Opponent | Site | Result |
|---|---|---|---|
| September 24 | at Marshall* | Fairfield Stadium; Huntington, WV | L 0–66 |
| October 1 | Union (KY)* | Louisville, KY | L 6–32 |
| October 8 | at Murray State | Murray, KY | L 0–105 |
| October 15 | at Eastern Kentucky | Richmond, KY | L 0–38 |
| October 22 | Transylvania | Louisville, KY | L 12–34 |
| October 28 | Morehead State* | Louisville, KY | L 0–20 |
| November 4 | at Oakland City* | Oakland City, IN | L 0–19 |
| November 12 | Georgetown (KY) | Louisville, KY | L 0–20 |
| November 19 | at Western Kentucky State Teachers | Bowling Green, KY | L 0–58 |
*Non-conference game
