= 1932 South Dakota Coyotes football team =

American college football season

1932 South Dakota Coyotes football
- Conference: North Central Conference
- Record: 4–5–1 (1–1–1 NCC)
- Head coach: Stanley G. Backman (2nd season)
- Home stadium: Inman Field

1932 North Central Conference football standings
	Conf.					Overall
Team	W		L		T	W		L		T
North Dakota Agricultural $	4	–	0	–	0	7	–	2	–	0
North Dakota	2	–	1	–	0	7	–	1	–	0
South Dakota	1	–	1	–	1	4	–	5	–	1
South Dakota State	1	–	2	–	1	2	–	5	–	1
Morningside	0	–	4	–	0	2	–	6	–	0
$ – Conference champion

The 1932 South Dakota Coyotes football team was an American football team that represented the University of South Dakota in the North Central Conference (NCC) during the 1932 college football season. In its second season under head coach Stanley G. Backman, the team compiled a 4–5–1 record (1–1–1 against NCC opponents), finished in third place out of five teams in the NCC, and outscored opponents by a total of 78 to 70. The team played its home games at Inman Field in Vermillion, South Dakota.

== Schedule ==
Date	Opponent	Site	Result	Attendance	Source
September 17	Dakota Wesleyan	Inman Field; Vermillion, SD	W 25–0		
September 24	Yankton*	Inman Field; Vermillion, SD	W 20–0		
September 30	at North Dakota Agricultural	Dacotah Field; Fargo, ND	L 8–18		
October 8	Morningside	Inman Field; Vermillion, SD	W 6–0		
October 15	at Cincinnati	Nippert Stadium; Cincinnati, OH	L 0–7		
October 22	at South Dakota State	Brookings, SD	T 0–0		
October 29	at Carleton*	Northfield, MN	W 6–0		
November 5	at Michigan State	College Field; East Lansing, MI	L 6–20		
November 19	at Gonzaga	Gonzaga Stadium; Spokane, WA	L 0–12		
November 24	at BYU	Ogden Stadium; Ogden, UT	L 7–13	2,000	
*Non-conference game
