= 1932 Mississippi College Choctaws football team =

American college football season

1932 Mississippi College Choctaws football
- Conference: Dixie Conference, Southern Intercollegiate Athletic Association
- Record: 4–4 (2–1 Dixie, 4–1 SIAA)
- Head coach: Stanley L. Robinson (8th season)
- Home stadium: Provine Field; Municipal Stadium

1932 Dixie Conference football standings
| | Conf. | | | | | Overall |
| Team | W | | L | | T | W | | L | | T |
|---|---|---|---|---|---|---|---|---|---|---|
| Mercer | 3 | – | 0 | – | 0 | 6 | – | 2 | – | 0 |
| Birmingham–Southern $ | 5 | – | 1 | – | 0 | 5 | – | 3 | – | 0 |
| Centre | 2 | – | 1 | – | 0 | 6 | – | 3 | – | 0 |
| Mississippi College | 2 | – | 1 | – | 0 | 3 | – | 4 | – | 1 |
| Southwestern (TN) | 2 | – | 2 | – | 0 | 4 | – | 6 | – | 0 |
| Millsaps | 2 | – | 3 | – | 0 | 4 | – | 5 | – | 0 |
| Chattanooga | 2 | – | 3 | – | 0 | 3 | – | 6 | – | 0 |
| Howard (AL) | 2 | – | 4 | – | 0 | 3 | – | 7 | – | 0 |
| Spring Hill | 0 | – | 5 | – | 0 | 0 | – | 7 | – | 0 |
$ – Conference champion

1932 Southern Intercollegiate Athletic Association football standings
| | Conf. | | | | | Overall |
| Team | W | | L | | T | W | | L | | T |
|---|---|---|---|---|---|---|---|---|---|---|
| Western Kentucky State Teachers $ | 6 | – | 0 | – | 0 | 7 | – | 1 | – | 0 |
| Furman | 5 | – | 0 | – | 0 | 8 | – | 1 | – | 0 |
| Southwestern (TN) | 3 | – | 0 | – | 0 | 4 | – | 6 | – | 0 |
| Rollins | 2 | – | 0 | – | 0 | 6 | – | 0 | – | 1 |
| Loyola (LA) | 2 | – | 0 | – | 0 | 6 | – | 4 | – | 1 |
| Centenary | 1 | – | 0 | – | 0 | 8 | – | 0 | – | 1 |
| Louisiana Normal | 4 | – | 1 | – | 0 | 7 | – | 1 | – | 0 |
| Centre | 4 | – | 1 | – | 0 | 6 | – | 3 | – | 0 |
| Mississippi College | 4 | – | 1 | – | 0 | 4 | – | 4 | – | 0 |
| Presbyterian | 3 | – | 1 | – | 1 | 5 | – | 2 | – | 1 |
| Mercer | 5 | – | 2 | – | 0 | 6 | – | 2 | – | 0 |
| Murray State | 3 | – | 2 | – | 1 | 4 | – | 2 | – | 3 |
| Georgetown (KY) | 3 | – | 2 | – | 0 | 4 | – | 5 | – | 0 |
| Eastern Kentucky | 1 | – | 1 | – | 1 | 2 | – | 1 | – | 2 |
| Mississippi State Teachers | 3 | – | 3 | – | 0 | 5 | – | 4 | – | 0 |
| Louisiana Tech | 3 | – | 3 | – | 0 | 4 | – | 4 | – | 0 |
| The Citadel | 2 | – | 2 | – | 0 | 4 | – | 5 | – | 0 |
| Middle Tennessee State Teachers | 2 | – | 3 | – | 0 | 4 | – | 6 | – | 0 |
| Newberry | 1 | – | 2 | – | 2 | 2 | – | 3 | – | 3 |
| Millsaps | 1 | – | 3 | – | 0 | 4 | – | 5 | – | 0 |
| SW Louisiana | 1 | – | 3 | – | 0 | 3 | – | 4 | – | 0 |
| Transylvania | 1 | – | 3 | – | 1 | 3 | – | 5 | – | 1 |
| Wofford | 1 | – | 3 | – | 1 | 3 | – | 6 | – | 1 |
| Louisiana College | 1 | – | 4 | – | 1 | 2 | – | 4 | – | 1 |
| Chattanooga | 1 | – | 4 | – | 0 | 3 | – | 6 | – | 0 |
| Miami (FL) | 0 | – | 2 | – | 1 | 4 | – | 3 | – | 1 |
| Louisville | 0 | – | 5 | – | 0 | 0 | – | 9 | – | 0 |
| Erskine | 0 | – | 6 | – | 0 | 1 | – | 9 | – | 0 |
| Union (TN) | 0 | – | 6 | – | 1 | 0 | – | 8 | – | 1 |
$ – Conference champion

The 1932 Mississippi College Choctaws football team was an American football team that represented Mississippi College as a member of the Dixie Conference and the Southern Intercollegiate Athletic Association (SIAA) in the 1932 college football season. Led by Stanley L. Robinson in his eighth season as head coach, the team compiled an overall record of 4–4 and with a mark of 2–1 in Dixie Conference play and 4–1 against SIAA competition.

== Schedule ==
| Date | Opponent | Site | Result | Source |
|---|---|---|---|---|
| September 23 | at Loyola (LA) | Loyola Stadium; New Orleans, LA | L 0–6 | |
| October 1 | Louisiana College | Provine Field; Clinton, MS | W 32–0 | |
| October 8 | Mississippi State* | Municipal Stadium; Jackson, MS | L 7–18 | |
| October 15 | Birmingham–Southern | Municipal Stadium; Jackson, MS | L 4–6 | |
| October 21 | vs. Spring Hill | Municipal Stadium; Laurel, MS | Canceled | |
| October 29 | at Chattanooga | Chamberlain Field; Chattanooga, TN | W 13–6 | |
| November 5 | at Colgate* | Whitnall Field; Hamilton, NY | L 0–32 | |
| November 12 | Louisiana Tech | Provine Field; Clinton, MS | W 20–7 | |
| November 24 | vs. Millsaps | Municipal Stadium; Jackson, MS (rivalry) | W 7–6 | |
*Non-conference game
