= 1932 Southwestern Lynx football team =

American college football season

1932 Southwestern Lynx football
- Conference: Dixie Conference, Southern Intercollegiate Athletic Association
- Record: 4–6 (2–2 Dixie, 3–0 SIAA)
- Head coach: Jimmy R. Haygood (2nd season)
- Home stadium: Fargason Field

1932 Dixie Conference football standings
	Conf.					Overall
Team	W		L		T	W		L		T
Mercer	3	–	0	–	0	6	–	2	–	0
Birmingham–Southern $	5	–	1	–	0	5	–	3	–	0
Centre	2	–	1	–	0	6	–	3	–	0
Mississippi College	2	–	1	–	0	3	–	4	–	1
Southwestern (TN)	2	–	2	–	0	4	–	6	–	0
Millsaps	2	–	3	–	0	4	–	5	–	0
Chattanooga	2	–	3	–	0	3	–	6	–	0
Howard (AL)	2	–	4	–	0	3	–	7	–	0
Spring Hill	0	–	5	–	0	0	–	7	–	0
$ – Conference champion

1932 Southern Intercollegiate Athletic Association football standings
	Conf.					Overall
Team	W		L		T	W		L		T
Western Kentucky State Teachers $	6	–	0	–	0	7	–	1	–	0
Furman	5	–	0	–	0	8	–	1	–	0
Southwestern (TN)	3	–	0	–	0	4	–	6	–	0
Rollins	2	–	0	–	0	6	–	0	–	1
Loyola (LA)	2	–	0	–	0	6	–	4	–	1
Centenary	1	–	0	–	0	8	–	0	–	1
Louisiana Normal	4	–	1	–	0	7	–	1	–	0
Centre	4	–	1	–	0	6	–	3	–	0
Mississippi College	4	–	1	–	0	4	–	4	–	0
Presbyterian	3	–	1	–	1	5	–	2	–	1
Mercer	5	–	2	–	0	6	–	2	–	0
Murray State	3	–	2	–	1	4	–	2	–	3
Georgetown (KY)	3	–	2	–	0	4	–	5	–	0
Eastern Kentucky	1	–	1	–	1	2	–	1	–	2
Mississippi State Teachers	3	–	3	–	0	5	–	4	–	0
Louisiana Tech	3	–	3	–	0	4	–	4	–	0
The Citadel	2	–	2	–	0	4	–	5	–	0
Middle Tennessee State Teachers	2	–	3	–	0	4	–	6	–	0
Newberry	1	–	2	–	2	2	–	3	–	3
Millsaps	1	–	3	–	0	4	–	5	–	0
SW Louisiana	1	–	3	–	0	3	–	4	–	0
Transylvania	1	–	3	–	1	3	–	5	–	1
Wofford	1	–	3	–	1	3	–	6	–	1
Louisiana College	1	–	4	–	1	2	–	4	–	1
Chattanooga	1	–	4	–	0	3	–	6	–	0
Miami (FL)	0	–	2	–	1	4	–	3	–	1
Louisville	0	–	5	–	0	0	–	9	–	0
Erskine	0	–	6	–	0	1	–	9	–	0
Union (TN)	0	–	6	–	1	0	–	8	–	1
$ – Conference champion

The 1932 Southwestern Lynx football team was an American football team that represented Southwestern Presbyterian University (now known as Rhodes College) as a member of the Dixie Conference and the Southern Intercollegiate Athletic Association (SIAA) in the 1932 college football season. Led by Jimmy R. Haygood in his second season as head coach, the Lynx compiled an overall record of 4–6 and with a mark of 2–2 in Dixie Conference play and 3–0 against SIAA competition.

== Schedule ==
Date	Opponent	Site	Result	Attendance	Source
September 24	at Alabama*	Denny Stadium; Tuscaloosa, AL	L 6–45	6,000	
September 30	Union (TN)	Fargason Field; Memphis, TN	W 41–0		
October 8	Millsaps	Fargason Field; Memphis, TN	W 20–0	3,500	
October 15	Sewanee*	Fargason Field; Memphis, TN (rivalry)	L 6–8	3,000	
October 22	Mississippi State Teachers	Fargason Field; Memphis, TN	W 19–0	2,500	
October 29	Howard (AL)	Fargason Field; Memphis, TN	L 13–14		
November 5	at Birmingham–Southern	Legion Field; Birmingham, AL	L 6–20		
November 11	at Mississippi State*	Scott Field; Starkville, MS	L 0–6	1,500	
November 19	Ole Miss*	Fargason Field; Memphis, TN	L 0–7		
November 24	Spring Hill	Fargason Field; Memphis, TN	W 41–0	2,000–3,000	
*Non-conference game
