= 1932 Mississippi State Teachers Yellow Jackets football team =

American college football season

1932 Mississippi State Teachers Yellow Jackets football
- Conference: Southern Intercollegiate Athletic Association
- Record: 5–4 (3–3 SIAA)
- Head coach: Pooley Hubert (2nd season)
- Home stadium: Faulkner Field

1932 Southern Intercollegiate Athletic Association football standings
	Conf.					Overall
Team	W		L		T	W		L		T
Western Kentucky State Teachers $	6	–	0	–	0	7	–	1	–	0
Furman	5	–	0	–	0	8	–	1	–	0
Southwestern (TN)	3	–	0	–	0	4	–	6	–	0
Rollins	2	–	0	–	0	6	–	0	–	1
Loyola (LA)	2	–	0	–	0	6	–	4	–	1
Centenary	1	–	0	–	0	8	–	0	–	1
Louisiana Normal	4	–	1	–	0	7	–	1	–	0
Centre	4	–	1	–	0	6	–	3	–	0
Mississippi College	4	–	1	–	0	4	–	4	–	0
Presbyterian	3	–	1	–	1	5	–	2	–	1
Mercer	5	–	2	–	0	6	–	2	–	0
Murray State	3	–	2	–	1	4	–	2	–	3
Georgetown (KY)	3	–	2	–	0	4	–	5	–	0
Eastern Kentucky	1	–	1	–	1	2	–	1	–	2
Mississippi State Teachers	3	–	3	–	0	5	–	4	–	0
Louisiana Tech	3	–	3	–	0	4	–	4	–	0
The Citadel	2	–	2	–	0	4	–	5	–	0
Middle Tennessee State Teachers	2	–	3	–	0	4	–	6	–	0
Newberry	1	–	2	–	2	2	–	3	–	3
Millsaps	1	–	3	–	0	4	–	5	–	0
SW Louisiana	1	–	3	–	0	3	–	4	–	0
Transylvania	1	–	3	–	1	3	–	5	–	1
Wofford	1	–	3	–	1	3	–	6	–	1
Louisiana College	1	–	4	–	1	2	–	4	–	1
Chattanooga	1	–	4	–	0	3	–	6	–	0
Miami (FL)	0	–	2	–	1	4	–	3	–	1
Louisville	0	–	5	–	0	0	–	9	–	0
Erskine	0	–	6	–	0	1	–	9	–	0
Union (TN)	0	–	6	–	1	0	–	8	–	1
$ – Conference champion

The 1932 Mississippi State Teachers Yellow Jackets football team was an American football team that represented the Mississippi State Teachers College (now known as the University of Southern Mississippi) as a member of the Southern Intercollegiate Athletic Association during the 1932 college football season. In their second year under head coach Pooley Hubert, the team compiled a 5–4 record.

== Schedule ==
Date	Opponent	Site	Result	Attendance	Source
September 24	at Ole Miss*	Hemingway Stadium; Oxford, MS	L 0–49		
September 30	at Millsaps	Millsaps Field; Jackson, MS	L 0–27		
October 7	at Southwestern Louisiana	Campus Athletic Field; Lafayette, LA	W 12–7		
October 22	at Southwestern (TN)	Fargason Field; Memphis, TN	L 0–19		
October 29	Spring Hill*^{†}	Faulkner Field; Hattiesburg, MS	W 12–0	4,000	
November 5	Louisiana College	Faulkner Field; Hattiesburg, MS	W 12–0		
November 12	at Louisiana Normal	Demon Field; Natchitoches, LA	L 6–31		
November 19	Delta State*	Faulkner Field; Hattiesburg, MS	W 33–25		
November 24	Union (TN)	Faulkner Field; Hattiesburg, MS	W 6–0		
*Non-conference game; ^{†}Homecoming
