= 1932 Southwestern Louisiana Bulldogs football team =

American college football season

1932 Southwestern Louisiana Bulldogs football
- Conference: Southern Intercollegiate Athletic Association
- Record: 3–4 (1–3 SIAA)
- Head coach: Truman F. Wilbanks (2nd season)
- Home stadium: Campus Athletic Field

1932 Southern Intercollegiate Athletic Association football standings
	Conf.					Overall
Team	W		L		T	W		L		T
Western Kentucky State Teachers $	6	–	0	–	0	7	–	1	–	0
Furman	5	–	0	–	0	8	–	1	–	0
Southwestern (TN)	3	–	0	–	0	4	–	6	–	0
Rollins	2	–	0	–	0	6	–	0	–	1
Loyola (LA)	2	–	0	–	0	6	–	4	–	1
Centenary	1	–	0	–	0	8	–	0	–	1
Louisiana Normal	4	–	1	–	0	7	–	1	–	0
Centre	4	–	1	–	0	6	–	3	–	0
Mississippi College	4	–	1	–	0	4	–	4	–	0
Presbyterian	3	–	1	–	1	5	–	2	–	1
Mercer	5	–	2	–	0	6	–	2	–	0
Murray State	3	–	2	–	1	4	–	2	–	3
Georgetown (KY)	3	–	2	–	0	4	–	5	–	0
Eastern Kentucky	1	–	1	–	1	2	–	1	–	2
Mississippi State Teachers	3	–	3	–	0	5	–	4	–	0
Louisiana Tech	3	–	3	–	0	4	–	4	–	0
The Citadel	2	–	2	–	0	4	–	5	–	0
Middle Tennessee State Teachers	2	–	3	–	0	4	–	6	–	0
Newberry	1	–	2	–	2	2	–	3	–	3
Millsaps	1	–	3	–	0	4	–	5	–	0
SW Louisiana	1	–	3	–	0	3	–	4	–	0
Transylvania	1	–	3	–	1	3	–	5	–	1
Wofford	1	–	3	–	1	3	–	6	–	1
Louisiana College	1	–	4	–	1	2	–	4	–	1
Chattanooga	1	–	4	–	0	3	–	6	–	0
Miami (FL)	0	–	2	–	1	4	–	3	–	1
Louisville	0	–	5	–	0	0	–	9	–	0
Erskine	0	–	6	–	0	1	–	9	–	0
Union (TN)	0	–	6	–	1	0	–	8	–	1
$ – Conference champion

The 1932 Southwestern Louisiana Bulldogs football team was an American football team that represented the Southwestern Louisiana Institute of Liberal and Technical Learning (now known as the University of Louisiana at Lafayette) in the Southern Intercollegiate Athletic Association during the 1932 college football season. In their second year under head coach Truman F. Wilbanks, the team compiled a 3–4 record.

== Schedule ==
Date	Opponent	Site	Result	Source
September 30	Southeastern Louisiana*	Campus Athletic Field; Lafayette, LA (rivalry)	W 6–0	
October 7	at Mississippi State Teachers	Campus Athletic Field; Lafayette, LA	L 7–12	
October 14	Stephen F. Austin*	Campus Athletic Field; Lafayette, LA	W 19–6	
October 21	Louisiana Tech	Campus Athletic Field; Lafayette, LA (rivalry)	L 0–15	
November 5	at Lamar*	Beaumont, TX (rivalry)	L 0–6	
November 11	at Louisiana College	Alumni Field; Pineville, LA	W 14–6	
November 24	Louisiana Normal	Campus Athletic Field; Lafayette, LA	L 0–8	
*Non-conference game
