= 1932 Chattanooga Moccasins football team =

American college football season

1932 Chattanooga Moccasins football
- Conference: Dixie Conference, Southern Intercollegiate Athletic Association
- Record: 3–6 (2–3 Dixie, 1–4 SIAA)
- Head coach: Scrappy Moore (2nd season)
- Captain: John Haswell
- Home stadium: Chamberlain Field

1932 Dixie Conference football standings
	Conf.					Overall
Team	W		L		T	W		L		T
Mercer	3	–	0	–	0	6	–	2	–	0
Birmingham–Southern $	5	–	1	–	0	5	–	3	–	0
Centre	2	–	1	–	0	6	–	3	–	0
Mississippi College	2	–	1	–	0	3	–	4	–	1
Southwestern (TN)	2	–	2	–	0	4	–	6	–	0
Millsaps	2	–	3	–	0	4	–	5	–	0
Chattanooga	2	–	3	–	0	3	–	6	–	0
Howard (AL)	2	–	4	–	0	3	–	7	–	0
Spring Hill	0	–	5	–	0	0	–	7	–	0
$ – Conference champion

1932 Southern Intercollegiate Athletic Association football standings
	Conf.					Overall
Team	W		L		T	W		L		T
Western Kentucky State Teachers $	6	–	0	–	0	7	–	1	–	0
Furman	5	–	0	–	0	8	–	1	–	0
Southwestern (TN)	3	–	0	–	0	4	–	6	–	0
Rollins	2	–	0	–	0	6	–	0	–	1
Loyola (LA)	2	–	0	–	0	6	–	4	–	1
Centenary	1	–	0	–	0	8	–	0	–	1
Louisiana Normal	4	–	1	–	0	7	–	1	–	0
Centre	4	–	1	–	0	6	–	3	–	0
Mississippi College	4	–	1	–	0	4	–	4	–	0
Presbyterian	3	–	1	–	1	5	–	2	–	1
Mercer	5	–	2	–	0	6	–	2	–	0
Murray State	3	–	2	–	1	4	–	2	–	3
Georgetown (KY)	3	–	2	–	0	4	–	5	–	0
Eastern Kentucky	1	–	1	–	1	2	–	1	–	2
Mississippi State Teachers	3	–	3	–	0	5	–	4	–	0
Louisiana Tech	3	–	3	–	0	4	–	4	–	0
The Citadel	2	–	2	–	0	4	–	5	–	0
Middle Tennessee State Teachers	2	–	3	–	0	4	–	6	–	0
Newberry	1	–	2	–	2	2	–	3	–	3
Millsaps	1	–	3	–	0	4	–	5	–	0
SW Louisiana	1	–	3	–	0	3	–	4	–	0
Transylvania	1	–	3	–	1	3	–	5	–	1
Wofford	1	–	3	–	1	3	–	6	–	1
Louisiana College	1	–	4	–	1	2	–	4	–	1
Chattanooga	1	–	4	–	0	3	–	6	–	0
Miami (FL)	0	–	2	–	1	4	–	3	–	1
Louisville	0	–	5	–	0	0	–	9	–	0
Erskine	0	–	6	–	0	1	–	9	–	0
Union (TN)	0	–	6	–	1	0	–	8	–	1
$ – Conference champion

The 1932 Chattanooga Moccasins football team was an American football team that represented the University of Chattanooga (now known as the University of Tennessee at Chattanooga) in the Dixie Conference and the Southern Intercollegiate Athletic Association (SIAA) during the 1932 college football season. In its second year under head coach Scrappy Moore, the team compiled a 3–6 record.

== Schedule ==
Date	Time	Opponent	Site	Result	Attendance	Source
September 24		Tennessee*	Chamberlain Field; Chattanooga, TN	L 0–13	3,635	
October 1		Spring Hill	Chamberlain Field; Chattanooga, TN	W 45–7		
October 8		Middle Tennessee State Teachers	Chamberlain Field; Chattanooga, TN	W 26–9	1,803	
October 15		at Catholic University*	Brookland Stadium; Washington, DC	L 0–19	10,000	
October 22		at Howard (AL)	Legion Field; Birmingham, AL	W 19–0	4,000	
October 29		Mississippi College	Chamberlain Field; Chattanooga, TN	L 6–13		
November 5		at Loyola (LA)	Loyola University Stadium; New Orleans, LA	L 0–14	6,000	
November 11		Mercer	Chamberlain Field; Chattanooga, TN	L 0–25		
November 24	2:00 p.m.	Centre	Chamberlain Field; Chattanooga, TN	L 6–20	2,500	
*Non-conference game; All times are in Central time
