= Festival of Palms Bowl =

Defunct college football bowl game held in Miami, Florida

The Festival of Palms Bowl was a postseason college football bowl game held New Year's Day in Miami, Florida. The game was held twice, following the 1932 and 1933 seasons, before being renamed the Orange Bowl. In 1932, George E. Hussey, official greeter of Miami, organized the first Palm Festival game. With Miami suffering from both the Great Depression and the preceding Florida land bust, Hussey and other Miamians sought to help its economy by holding a game similar to Pasadena's Rose Bowl.

Both games pitted an invited opponent against the Hurricanes of the University of Miami. In the first game, played on January 2, 1933, Miami defeated Manhattan, 7–0. In the second game, played on New Year's Day 1934, Duquesne defeated Miami 33–7.

These games are not recognized as bowl games by the National Collegiate Athletic Association (NCAA) because one team was guaranteed a berth regardless of record. However, following the success of these games, backers organized another game for New Year's Day 1935, the Orange Bowl. This game did not automatically grant a berth to one team, although Miami was again a participant. For this reason, the 1935 Orange Bowl was later recognized by the NCAA as an official bowl game.

== Game results ==
Date	Winner		Loser	
January 2, 1933	Miami (FL)	7	Manhattan	0
January 1, 1934	Duquesne	33	Miami (FL)	7

== See also ==
- List of college bowl games
