= 1932 Howard Bulldogs football team =

American college football season

1932 Howard Bulldogs football
- Conference: Dixie Conference
- Record: 3–7 (2–4 Dixie)
- Head coach: Eddie McLane (4th season)
- Home stadium: Legion Field

1932 Dixie Conference football standings
	Conf.					Overall
Team	W		L		T	W		L		T
Mercer	3	–	0	–	0	6	–	2	–	0
Birmingham–Southern $	5	–	1	–	0	5	–	3	–	0
Centre	2	–	1	–	0	6	–	3	–	0
Mississippi College	2	–	1	–	0	3	–	4	–	1
Southwestern (TN)	2	–	2	–	0	4	–	6	–	0
Millsaps	2	–	3	–	0	4	–	5	–	0
Chattanooga	2	–	3	–	0	3	–	6	–	0
Howard (AL)	2	–	4	–	0	3	–	7	–	0
Spring Hill	0	–	5	–	0	0	–	7	–	0
$ – Conference champion

The 1932 Howard Bulldogs football team was an American football team that represented Howard College (now known as the Samford University) as a member of the Dixie Conference during the 1932 college football season. In their fourth year under head coach Eddie McLane, the team compiled an overall record of record of 3–7 with a mark of 2–4 in conference play, placing eighth in the Dixie Conference.

== Schedule ==
Date	Opponent	Site	Result	Attendance	Source
September 16	Spring Hill	Legion Field; Birmingham, AL	W 13–0	5,000	
September 23	at Oglethorpe*	Ponce de Leon Park; Atlanta, GA	W 14–6	3,000	
October 1	at Mercer	Centennial Stadium; Macon, GA	L 6–21		
October 8	at Ole Miss*	Hemingway Stadium; Oxford, MS	L 6–26		
October 15	at North Dakota*	Memorial Stadium; Grand Forks, ND	L 7–39		
October 22	Chattanooga	Legion Field; Birmingham, AL	L 0–19	4,000	
October 29	at Southwestern (TN)	Fargason Field; Memphis, TN	W 14–13		
November 5	at Auburn*	Cramton Bowl; Montgomery, AL	L 0–25		
November 11	at Millsaps	Alumni Field; Jackson, MS	L 0–19		
November 19	vs. Birmingham–Southern	Legion Field; Birmingham, AL	L 0–7		
*Non-conference game
