= 1932 Furman Purple Hurricane football team =

American college football season

1932 Furman Purple Hurricane football
- Conference: Southern Intercollegiate Athletic Association
- Record: 8–1 (5–0 SIAA)
- Head coach: Dizzy McLeod (1st season)
- Captain: Ralph Peden
- Home stadium: Manly Field

1932 Southern Intercollegiate Athletic Association football standings
	Conf.					Overall
Team	W		L		T	W		L		T
Western Kentucky State Teachers $	6	–	0	–	0	7	–	1	–	0
Furman	5	–	0	–	0	8	–	1	–	0
Southwestern (TN)	3	–	0	–	0	4	–	6	–	0
Rollins	2	–	0	–	0	6	–	0	–	1
Loyola (LA)	2	–	0	–	0	6	–	4	–	1
Centenary	1	–	0	–	0	8	–	0	–	1
Louisiana Normal	4	–	1	–	0	7	–	1	–	0
Centre	4	–	1	–	0	6	–	3	–	0
Mississippi College	4	–	1	–	0	4	–	4	–	0
Presbyterian	3	–	1	–	1	5	–	2	–	1
Mercer	5	–	2	–	0	6	–	2	–	0
Murray State	3	–	2	–	1	4	–	2	–	3
Georgetown (KY)	3	–	2	–	0	4	–	5	–	0
Eastern Kentucky	1	–	1	–	1	2	–	1	–	2
Mississippi State Teachers	3	–	3	–	0	5	–	4	–	0
Louisiana Tech	3	–	3	–	0	4	–	4	–	0
The Citadel	2	–	2	–	0	4	–	5	–	0
Middle Tennessee State Teachers	2	–	3	–	0	4	–	6	–	0
Newberry	1	–	2	–	2	2	–	3	–	3
Millsaps	1	–	3	–	0	4	–	5	–	0
SW Louisiana	1	–	3	–	0	3	–	4	–	0
Transylvania	1	–	3	–	1	3	–	5	–	1
Wofford	1	–	3	–	1	3	–	6	–	1
Louisiana College	1	–	4	–	1	2	–	4	–	1
Chattanooga	1	–	4	–	0	3	–	6	–	0
Miami (FL)	0	–	2	–	1	4	–	3	–	1
Louisville	0	–	5	–	0	0	–	9	–	0
Erskine	0	–	6	–	0	1	–	9	–	0
Union (TN)	0	–	6	–	1	0	–	8	–	1
$ – Conference champion

The 1932 Furman Purple Hurricane football team represented Furman University as a member of the Southern Intercollegiate Athletic Association (SIAA) during the 1932 college football season. Led by first-year head coach Dizzy McLeod, the Purple Hurricane compiled an overall record of 8–1, with a mark of 5–0 in conference play, and finished second in the SIAA.

== Schedule ==
Date	Opponent	Site	Result	Attendance	Source
September 24	Newberry	Manly Field; Greenville, SC	W 25–6		
October 1	at Army*	Michie Stadium; West Point, NY	L 0–13		
October 8	Erskine	Manly Field; Greenville, SC	W 58–0		
October 15	Davis & Elkins*	Manly Field; Greenville, SC	W 19–0		
October 22	at Mercer	Centennial Stadium; Macon, GA	W 2–0	8,000	
October 27	vs. The Citadel	County Fairgrounds; Orangeburg, SC (rivalry)	W 20–0		
November 5	at Wofford	Snyder Field; Spartanburg, SC (rivalry)	W 24–0		
November 12	South Carolina*	Manly Field; Greenville, SC	W 14–0		
November 24	Clemson*	Manly Field; Greenville, SC	W 7–0		
*Non-conference game
