= 1932 Middle Tennessee State Teachers football team =

American college football season

1932 Middle Tennessee State Teachers football
- Conference: Southern Intercollegiate Athletic Association
- Record: 4–6 (2–3 SIAA)
- Head coach: Frank Faulkinberry (7th season)
- Captain: Luther Smith

1932 Southern Intercollegiate Athletic Association football standings
| | Conf. | | | | | Overall |
| Team | W | | L | | T | W | | L | | T |
|---|---|---|---|---|---|---|---|---|---|---|
| Western Kentucky State Teachers $ | 6 | – | 0 | – | 0 | 7 | – | 1 | – | 0 |
| Furman | 5 | – | 0 | – | 0 | 8 | – | 1 | – | 0 |
| Southwestern (TN) | 3 | – | 0 | – | 0 | 4 | – | 6 | – | 0 |
| Rollins | 2 | – | 0 | – | 0 | 6 | – | 0 | – | 1 |
| Loyola (LA) | 2 | – | 0 | – | 0 | 6 | – | 4 | – | 1 |
| Centenary | 1 | – | 0 | – | 0 | 8 | – | 0 | – | 1 |
| Louisiana Normal | 4 | – | 1 | – | 0 | 7 | – | 1 | – | 0 |
| Centre | 4 | – | 1 | – | 0 | 6 | – | 3 | – | 0 |
| Mississippi College | 4 | – | 1 | – | 0 | 4 | – | 4 | – | 0 |
| Presbyterian | 3 | – | 1 | – | 1 | 5 | – | 2 | – | 1 |
| Mercer | 5 | – | 2 | – | 0 | 6 | – | 2 | – | 0 |
| Murray State | 3 | – | 2 | – | 1 | 4 | – | 2 | – | 3 |
| Georgetown (KY) | 3 | – | 2 | – | 0 | 4 | – | 5 | – | 0 |
| Eastern Kentucky | 1 | – | 1 | – | 1 | 2 | – | 1 | – | 2 |
| Mississippi State Teachers | 3 | – | 3 | – | 0 | 5 | – | 4 | – | 0 |
| Louisiana Tech | 3 | – | 3 | – | 0 | 4 | – | 4 | – | 0 |
| The Citadel | 2 | – | 2 | – | 0 | 4 | – | 5 | – | 0 |
| Middle Tennessee State Teachers | 2 | – | 3 | – | 0 | 4 | – | 6 | – | 0 |
| Newberry | 1 | – | 2 | – | 2 | 2 | – | 3 | – | 3 |
| Millsaps | 1 | – | 3 | – | 0 | 4 | – | 5 | – | 0 |
| SW Louisiana | 1 | – | 3 | – | 0 | 3 | – | 4 | – | 0 |
| Transylvania | 1 | – | 3 | – | 1 | 3 | – | 5 | – | 1 |
| Wofford | 1 | – | 3 | – | 1 | 3 | – | 6 | – | 1 |
| Louisiana College | 1 | – | 4 | – | 1 | 2 | – | 4 | – | 1 |
| Chattanooga | 1 | – | 4 | – | 0 | 3 | – | 6 | – | 0 |
| Miami (FL) | 0 | – | 2 | – | 1 | 4 | – | 3 | – | 1 |
| Louisville | 0 | – | 5 | – | 0 | 0 | – | 9 | – | 0 |
| Erskine | 0 | – | 6 | – | 0 | 1 | – | 9 | – | 0 |
| Union (TN) | 0 | – | 6 | – | 1 | 0 | – | 8 | – | 1 |
$ – Conference champion

The 1932 Middle Tennessee State Teachers football team represented the Middle Tennessee State Teachers College (now known as Middle Tennessee State University) as a member of the Southern Intercollegiate Athletic Association (SIAA) during the 1932 college football season. Led by Frank Faulkinberry in his seventh and final season as head coach, Middle Tennessee State Teachers compiled an overall record of 4–6 with a mark of 2–3 in conference play. The team's captain was Luther Smith.

== Schedule ==
| Date | Time | Opponent | Site | Result | Attendance | Source |
|---|---|---|---|---|---|---|
| September 17 | | at Sewanee* | Hardee Field; Sewanee, TN | L 0–12 | | |
| September 24 | | at Maryville (TN)* | Maryville, TN | L 6–12 | | |
| October 1 | | Tennessee Junior* | Murfreesboro, TN | W 18–7 | | |
| October 8 | | at Chattanooga | Chamberlain Field; Chattanooga, TN | L 0–26 | 1,803 | |
| October 15 | | Western Kentucky State Teachers | Murfreesboro, TN (rivalry) | L 7–21 | | |
| October 29 | | Murray State | Murfreesboro, TN | L 6–7 | | |
| November 5 | 2:30 p.m. | at West Tennessee State Teachers* | Memorial Field; Memphis, TN | W 6–0 | | |
| November 12 | | Union (TN) | Murfreesboro, TN | W 14–7 | | |
| November 24 | | Tennessee Tech* | Murfreesboro, TN | L 6–32 | | |
| December 3 | | at Miami (FL) | Moore Park; Miami, FL | W 7–0 | | |
*Non-conference game; All times are in Central time
