= 1932 Mercer Bears football team =

American college football season

1932 Mercer Bears football
- Conference: Dixie Conference, Southern Intercollegiate Athletic Association
- Record: 6–2 (3–0 Dixie, 5–2 SIAA)
- Head coach: Lake Russell (4th season)
- Home stadium: Centennial Stadium

1932 Dixie Conference football standings
	Conf.					Overall
Team	W		L		T	W		L		T
Mercer	3	–	0	–	0	6	–	2	–	0
Birmingham–Southern $	5	–	1	–	0	5	–	3	–	0
Centre	2	–	1	–	0	6	–	3	–	0
Mississippi College	2	–	1	–	0	3	–	4	–	1
Southwestern (TN)	2	–	2	–	0	4	–	6	–	0
Millsaps	2	–	3	–	0	4	–	5	–	0
Chattanooga	2	–	3	–	0	3	–	6	–	0
Howard (AL)	2	–	4	–	0	3	–	7	–	0
Spring Hill	0	–	5	–	0	0	–	7	–	0
$ – Conference champion

1932 Southern Intercollegiate Athletic Association football standings
	Conf.					Overall
Team	W		L		T	W		L		T
Western Kentucky State Teachers $	6	–	0	–	0	7	–	1	–	0
Furman	5	–	0	–	0	8	–	1	–	0
Southwestern (TN)	3	–	0	–	0	4	–	6	–	0
Rollins	2	–	0	–	0	6	–	0	–	1
Loyola (LA)	2	–	0	–	0	6	–	4	–	1
Centenary	1	–	0	–	0	8	–	0	–	1
Louisiana Normal	4	–	1	–	0	7	–	1	–	0
Centre	4	–	1	–	0	6	–	3	–	0
Mississippi College	4	–	1	–	0	4	–	4	–	0
Presbyterian	3	–	1	–	1	5	–	2	–	1
Mercer	5	–	2	–	0	6	–	2	–	0
Murray State	3	–	2	–	1	4	–	2	–	3
Georgetown (KY)	3	–	2	–	0	4	–	5	–	0
Eastern Kentucky	1	–	1	–	1	2	–	1	–	2
Mississippi State Teachers	3	–	3	–	0	5	–	4	–	0
Louisiana Tech	3	–	3	–	0	4	–	4	–	0
The Citadel	2	–	2	–	0	4	–	5	–	0
Middle Tennessee State Teachers	2	–	3	–	0	4	–	6	–	0
Newberry	1	–	2	–	2	2	–	3	–	3
Millsaps	1	–	3	–	0	4	–	5	–	0
SW Louisiana	1	–	3	–	0	3	–	4	–	0
Transylvania	1	–	3	–	1	3	–	5	–	1
Wofford	1	–	3	–	1	3	–	6	–	1
Louisiana College	1	–	4	–	1	2	–	4	–	1
Chattanooga	1	–	4	–	0	3	–	6	–	0
Miami (FL)	0	–	2	–	1	4	–	3	–	1
Louisville	0	–	5	–	0	0	–	9	–	0
Erskine	0	–	6	–	0	1	–	9	–	0
Union (TN)	0	–	6	–	1	0	–	8	–	1
$ – Conference champion

The 1932 Mercer Bears football team was an American football team that represented Mercer University as a member of both the Dixie Conference and the Southern Intercollegiate Athletic Association (SIAA) during the 1932 college football season. In their fourth year under head coach Lake Russell, the team compiled a 6–2 record.

On November 21, 1932, the school announced that they would be renouncing all claim to the Dixie Conference football championship in 1932, as the by-laws for the conference required a team to play 4 games against Dixie Conference competition in order to be eligible for the title.

== Schedule ==
Date	Time	Opponent	Site	Result	Attendance	Source
September 24		at Vanderbilt*	Dudley Field; Nashville, TN	L 7–20	5,000	
October 1		Howard (AL)	Centennial Stadium; Macon, GA	W 21–6		
October 8		Presbyterian	Centennial Stadium; Macon, GA	W 51–0		
October 22		Furman	Centennial Stadium; Macon, GA	L 0–2	8,000	
October 29		vs. Parris Island Marines*	Municipal Stadium; Savannah, GA	W 57–0		
November 5	3:00 p.m.	at Centre	Cheek Field; Danville, KY	W 8–0	5,000	
November 11		at Chattanooga	Chamberlain Field; Chattanooga, TN	W 25–0		
November 24		at Oglethorpe*	Hermance Stadium; Atlanta, GA	W 7–6		
*Non-conference game; All times are in Eastern time
