= 1932 Loyola Wolf Pack football team =

American college football season

1932 Loyola Wolf Pack football
- Conference: Southern Intercollegiate Athletic Association
- Record: 6–4–1 (2–1 SIAA)
- Head coach: Clark Shaughnessy (6th season)
- Home stadium: Loyola University Stadium

1932 Southern Intercollegiate Athletic Association football standings
	Conf.					Overall
Team	W		L		T	W		L		T
Western Kentucky State Teachers $	6	–	0	–	0	7	–	1	–	0
Furman	5	–	0	–	0	8	–	1	–	0
Southwestern (TN)	3	–	0	–	0	4	–	6	–	0
Rollins	2	–	0	–	0	6	–	0	–	1
Loyola (LA)	2	–	0	–	0	6	–	4	–	1
Centenary	1	–	0	–	0	8	–	0	–	1
Louisiana Normal	4	–	1	–	0	7	–	1	–	0
Centre	4	–	1	–	0	6	–	3	–	0
Mississippi College	4	–	1	–	0	4	–	4	–	0
Presbyterian	3	–	1	–	1	5	–	2	–	1
Mercer	5	–	2	–	0	6	–	2	–	0
Murray State	3	–	2	–	1	4	–	2	–	3
Georgetown (KY)	3	–	2	–	0	4	–	5	–	0
Eastern Kentucky	1	–	1	–	1	2	–	1	–	2
Mississippi State Teachers	3	–	3	–	0	5	–	4	–	0
Louisiana Tech	3	–	3	–	0	4	–	4	–	0
The Citadel	2	–	2	–	0	4	–	5	–	0
Middle Tennessee State Teachers	2	–	3	–	0	4	–	6	–	0
Newberry	1	–	2	–	2	2	–	3	–	3
Millsaps	1	–	3	–	0	4	–	5	–	0
SW Louisiana	1	–	3	–	0	3	–	4	–	0
Transylvania	1	–	3	–	1	3	–	5	–	1
Wofford	1	–	3	–	1	3	–	6	–	1
Louisiana College	1	–	4	–	1	2	–	4	–	1
Chattanooga	1	–	4	–	0	3	–	6	–	0
Miami (FL)	0	–	2	–	1	4	–	3	–	1
Louisville	0	–	5	–	0	0	–	9	–	0
Erskine	0	–	6	–	0	1	–	9	–	0
Union (TN)	0	–	6	–	1	0	–	8	–	1
$ – Conference champion

The 1932 Loyola Wolf Pack football team was an American football team that represented Loyola College of New Orleans (now known as Loyola University New Orleans) as a member of the Southern Intercollegiate Athletic Association (SIAA) during the 1932 college football season. In its sixth and final season under head coach Clark Shaughnessy, the team compiled a 6–4–1 record and outscored opponents by a total of 134 to 77. The team played its home games at Loyola University Stadium in New Orleans.

== Schedule ==
Date	Opponent	Site	Result	Attendance	Source
September 16	St. Edward's (TX)*	Loyola Stadium; New Orleans, LA	W 32–0		
September 23	Mississippi College	Loyola Stadium; New Orleans, LA	W 6–0		
September 30	Birmingham–Southern*	Loyola Stadium; New Orleans, LA	W 12–0		
October 7	Baylor*	Loyola Stadium; New Orleans, LA	L 0–18		
October 15	at Rice*	Rice Field; Houston, TX	L 7–14		
October 21	Saint Louis*	Loyola Stadium; New Orleans, LA	W 19–0		
October 28	at Xavier*	Corcoran Stadium; Cincinnati, OH	T 6–6		
November 5	Chattanooga	Loyola Stadium; New Orleans, LA	W 14–0	6,000	
November 11	Oglethorpe*	Loyola Stadium; New Orleans, LA	W 20–0	6,000	
November 24	North Dakota*	Loyola Stadium; New Orleans, LA	L 6–18		
December 3	Detroit*	Loyola Stadium; New Orleans, LA	L 12–21	6,000	
*Non-conference game
