= 1932 Spring Hill Badgers football team =

American college football season

1932 Spring Hill Badgers football
- Conference: Dixie Conference
- Record: 0–7 (0–5 Dixie)
- Head coach: Pat Browne (2nd season)

1932 Dixie Conference football standings
	Conf.					Overall
Team	W		L		T	W		L		T
Mercer	3	–	0	–	0	6	–	2	–	0
Birmingham–Southern $	5	–	1	–	0	5	–	3	–	0
Centre	2	–	1	–	0	6	–	3	–	0
Mississippi College	2	–	1	–	0	3	–	4	–	1
Southwestern (TN)	2	–	2	–	0	4	–	6	–	0
Millsaps	2	–	3	–	0	4	–	5	–	0
Chattanooga	2	–	3	–	0	3	–	6	–	0
Howard (AL)	2	–	4	–	0	3	–	7	–	0
Spring Hill	0	–	5	–	0	0	–	7	–	0
$ – Conference champion

The 1932 Spring Hill Badgers football team was an American football team that represented Spring Hill College as a member of the Dixie Conference during the 1932 college football season. In their second year under head coach Pat Browne, the team compiled a 0–7 record.

== Schedule ==
Date	Opponent	Site	Result	Attendance	Source
September 16	at Howard (AL)	Legion Field; Birmingham, AL	L 0–13	5,000	
October 1	at Chattanooga	Chamberlain Field; Chattanooga, TN	L 7–45	3,000	
October 7	at LSU*	Tiger Stadium; Baton Rouge, LA	L 0–80		
October 14	at Millsaps	Fair Grounds; Jackson, MS	L 0–32		
October 21	vs. Mississippi College	Municipal Stadium; Laurel, MS	Canceled		
October 29	at Mississippi State Teachers*	Faulkner Field; Hattiesburg, MS	L 0–12	4,000	
November 12	Birmingham–Southern	Mobile, AL	L 6–14		
November 24	at Southwestern (TN)	Fargason Field; Memphis, TN	L 0–41	2,000–3,000	
*Non-conference game
