= 1932 South Dakota State Jackrabbits football team =

American college football season

1932 South Dakota State Jackrabbits football
- Conference: North Central Conference
- Record: 2–5–1 (1–2–1 NCC)
- Head coach: Cy Kasper (5th season)
- Home stadium: State Field

1932 North Central Conference football standings
	Conf.					Overall
Team	W		L		T	W		L		T
North Dakota Agricultural $	4	–	0	–	0	7	–	2	–	0
North Dakota	2	–	1	–	0	7	–	1	–	0
South Dakota	1	–	1	–	1	4	–	5	–	1
South Dakota State	1	–	2	–	1	2	–	5	–	1
Morningside	0	–	4	–	0	2	–	6	–	0
$ – Conference champion

The 1932 South Dakota State Jackrabbits football team was an American football team that represented South Dakota State University in the North Central Conference (NCC) during the 1932 college football season. In its fifth season under head coach Cy Kasper, the team compiled a 2–5–1 record and was outscored by a total of 96 to 70.

== Schedule ==
Date	Opponent	Site	Result	Attendance	Source
September 24	Northern State*	State Field; Brookings, SD	W 26–7		
October 1	at Minnesota*	Memorial Stadium; Minneapolis, MN	L 0–12	20,000	
October 8	North Dakota Agricultural	State Field; Brookings, SD (rivalry)	L 6–12		
October 15	at Morningside	Sioux City, IA	W 26–6		
October 22	South Dakota	State Field; Brookings, SD (rivalry)	T 0–0		
October 28	at North Dakota	Memorial Stadium; Grand Forks, ND	L 0–13		
November 5	at Michigan State Normal*	Ypsilanti, MI	L 0–12		
November 11	at Duquesne*	Forbes Field; Pittsburgh, PA	L 12–34	5,000	
*Non-conference game
