= 1932 Western Kentucky State Teachers Hilltoppers football team =

American college football season

1932 Western Kentucky State Teachers Hilltoppers football

SIAA champion
- Conference: Southern Intercollegiate Athletic Association
- Record: 8–1 (6–0 SIAA)
- Head coach: Ernest R. Miller (1st season)
- Captain: Fletcher Holeman

1932 Southern Intercollegiate Athletic Association football standings
	Conf.					Overall
Team	W		L		T	W		L		T
Western Kentucky State Teachers $	6	–	0	–	0	7	–	1	–	0
Furman	5	–	0	–	0	8	–	1	–	0
Southwestern (TN)	3	–	0	–	0	4	–	6	–	0
Rollins	2	–	0	–	0	6	–	0	–	1
Loyola (LA)	2	–	0	–	0	6	–	4	–	1
Centenary	1	–	0	–	0	8	–	0	–	1
Louisiana Normal	4	–	1	–	0	7	–	1	–	0
Centre	4	–	1	–	0	6	–	3	–	0
Mississippi College	4	–	1	–	0	4	–	4	–	0
Presbyterian	3	–	1	–	1	5	–	2	–	1
Mercer	5	–	2	–	0	6	–	2	–	0
Murray State	3	–	2	–	1	4	–	2	–	3
Georgetown (KY)	3	–	2	–	0	4	–	5	–	0
Eastern Kentucky	1	–	1	–	1	2	–	1	–	2
Mississippi State Teachers	3	–	3	–	0	5	–	4	–	0
Louisiana Tech	3	–	3	–	0	4	–	4	–	0
The Citadel	2	–	2	–	0	4	–	5	–	0
Middle Tennessee State Teachers	2	–	3	–	0	4	–	6	–	0
Newberry	1	–	2	–	2	2	–	3	–	3
Millsaps	1	–	3	–	0	4	–	5	–	0
SW Louisiana	1	–	3	–	0	3	–	4	–	0
Transylvania	1	–	3	–	1	3	–	5	–	1
Wofford	1	–	3	–	1	3	–	6	–	1
Louisiana College	1	–	4	–	1	2	–	4	–	1
Chattanooga	1	–	4	–	0	3	–	6	–	0
Miami (FL)	0	–	2	–	1	4	–	3	–	1
Louisville	0	–	5	–	0	0	–	9	–	0
Erskine	0	–	6	–	0	1	–	9	–	0
Union (TN)	0	–	6	–	1	0	–	8	–	1
$ – Conference champion

The 1932 Western Kentucky State Teachers Hilltoppers football team represented Western Kentucky State Teachers College (now known as Western Kentucky University) during the 1932 college football season. They were coached by Ernest R. Miller and won the SIAA championship. Fletcher Holeman was the team captain.

== Schedule ==
Date	Opponent	Site	Result	Attendance	Source
September 24	Evansville	Bowling Green, KY	W 38–0		
October 1	Transylvania	Bowling Green, KY	W 27–7		
October 8	at Vanderbilt	Dudley Field; Nashville, TN	L 0–26	10,000	
October 15	at Middle Tennessee State Teachers	Murfreesboro, TN (rivalry)	W 21–7		
October 22	at Murray State	Cutchin Stadium; Murray, KY (rivalry)	W 6–0		
November 5	Georgetown (KY)^{†}	Bowling Green, KY	W 24–0		
November 12	Union (TN)	Bowling Green, KY	W 46–0		
November 19	Eastern Kentucky	Bowling Green, KY (rivalry)	W 1–0		
November 19	Louisville	Bowling Green, KY	W 58–0		
^{†}Homecoming
