= 1932 college football season =

American college football season

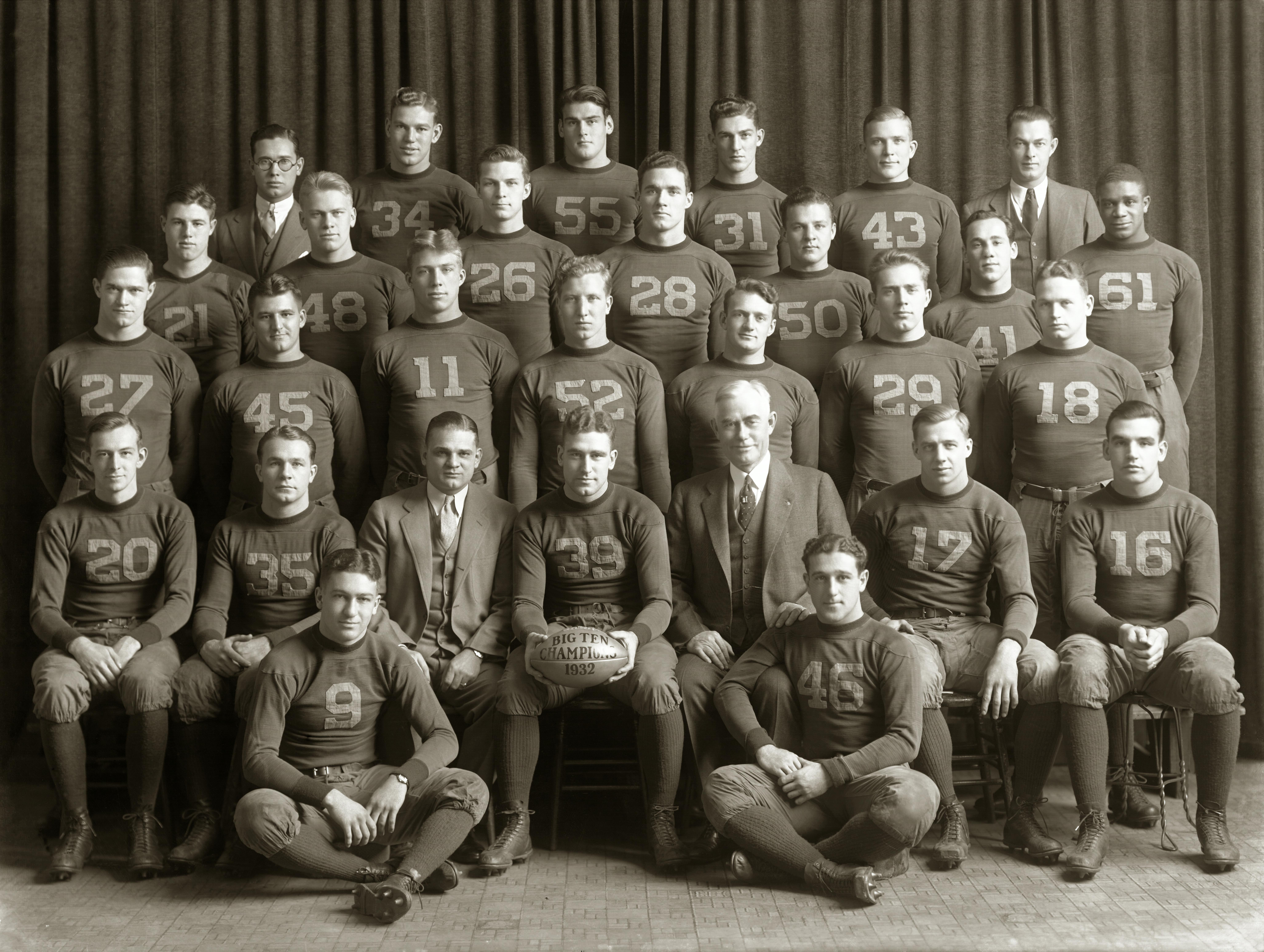
- Michigan, champions under the Dickinson System
- Number of bowls: 1
- Bowl games: January 2, 1933
- Champion(s): USC (Note: per Boand System, Dunkel System, Houlgate System, Williamson System, Berryman QPRS, Billingsley Report, College Football Researchers Association, Helms Athletic Foundation, National Championship Foundation, Poling System, Sagarin Ratings Predictor method); Michigan (Note: per Dickinson System (received Rockne Trophy) and Sagarin Ratings Elo chess method; co-champion (alongside Colgate) per Parke H. Davis (Spalding's Official Foot Ball Guide)); Colgate (not claimed) (Note: co-champion (alongside Michigan) per Parke H. Davis (Spalding's Official Foot Ball Guide))

The 1932 college football season saw the Michigan Wolverines win the Knute Rockne Memorial Trophy as national champion under the math-based Dickinson System. Because the "Big Nine" conference didn't permit its teams to play in the postseason, however, the Wolverines were not able to accept a bid to the Rose Bowl. As such, the Pasadena game matched the No. 2 and No. 3 teams, USC and Pittsburgh, with the USC Trojans winning the east–west matchup 35–0. The other four contemporary math system selectors (the Boand, Dunkel, Houlgate, and Williamson Systems) all selected USC as national champion. This was also the last season NFL would use college football rules.

== Conference and program changes ==
=== Conference changes ===
- Two new conferences began play in 1932:
  - Tri-State Conference – conference active through the 1961 season; later known as the Badger State Intercollegiate Conference, Badger-Illini Conference, and Badger-Gopher Conference
  - Northern Teachers Athletic Conference – an active NCAA Division II conference, later known as the Northern Intercollegiate Conference and now the Northern Sun Intercollegiate Conference
- One conference played its final season in 1932:
  - Big Four Conference – conference active since 1929; members from Oklahoma

=== Membership changes ===
School	1931 Conference	1932 Conference
Butler Bulldogs	Independent	Missouri Valley
Texas Tech Red Raiders	Independent	Border

== September ==
On September 17, Texas Christian University (TCU) opened its season with a 14–2 win over visiting North Texas.

September 24 USC beat Utah 35–0, Tennessee won 13–0 at UT-Chattanooga, and Pittsburgh beat visiting Ohio Northern College 47–0. TCU and LSU played to a 3–3 tie in Baton Rouge.

== October ==
October 1 Michigan beat Michigan State 26–0, Purdue beat Kansas State 29–13, Ohio State beat Ohio Wesleyan 34–7, Wisconsin beat Marquette 7–2. USC beat Washington State 20–0. Pittsburgh won at West Virginia, 40–0. Army beat Furman 13–0. Tennessee beat Ole Miss 33–0 and TCU defeated Daniel Baker College 55–0.

October 8 Michigan beat Northwestern 15–6, Wisconsin beat Iowa 34–0, Purdue won at Minnesota 7–0, and Ohio State and Indiana played to a 7–7 tie. USC beat Oregon State 10–0. Pittsburgh beat Duquesne 33–0. Army beat Carleton College 57–0. Notre Dame opened with a 73–0 win over Haskell College. Tennessee beat North Carolina 20–7 and TCU beat Arkansas 34–12.

October 15 In Birmingham, Tennessee and Alabama, both 3–0–0, met, with the visitors winning 7–3. Michigan won at Ohio State 14–0, while Purdue beat visiting Wisconsin 7–6, and Pittsburgh won at Army 18–13. TCU won at Texas A&M 17–0, USC defeated Loyola Marymount 6–0 and Notre Dame beat Drake 62–0.

October 22 USC (4–0–0) and Stanford (5–0–0) met at Palo Alto, with USC winning 13–0. At Pittsburgh, Ohio State and Pitt played to a 0–0 tie. Michigan beat Illinois 32–0, Purdue tied at Northwestern 7–7, and Wisconsin shut out Iowa's Coe College 39–0. Notre Dame beat Carnegie Tech 42–0. Army won at Yale 20–0. Tennessee beat Maryville College 60–0 and TCU beat Austin College 68–0

October 29 Pittsburgh (4–0–1) hosted Notre Dame (3–0–0) and won 12–0. Ohio State and Wisconsin played to a 7–7 tie giving OSU a record of 1–1–3. Michigan defeated Princeton 14–7 and Purdue beat NYU 34–9 at Yankee Stadium. Army beat William & Mary 33–0. Tennessee beat visiting Duke, 16–13, and TCU defeated Baylor 27–0.

== November ==
November 5 Notre Dame won at Kansas University, 24–6. Michigan won at Indiana 7–0, Ohio State won at Northwestern 20–6, Wisconsin beat Illinois 20–12 and Purdue won at Chicago 37–0. Pittsburgh won at Penn, 19–12. USC beat California 27–7. Army won at Harvard 46–0 Tennessee beat Mississippi State 31–0 and TCU won at Hardin-Simmonds 27–0.

November 11 On Armistice Day, TCU (8–0–1) hosted Texas (6–1–0) and won 14–0.

November 12 In Nashville, Tennessee (7–0–0) and Vanderbilt (6–0–1), played to a scoreless tie. Michigan beat Chicago 12–0, Purdue won at Iowa 18–0, and Wisconsin beat Minnesota 20–13. Ohio State beat Penn 19–0. USC beat Oregon 33–0. Army beat North Dakota State 52–0. At Lincoln, Neb., Pittsburgh and Nebraska played to a 0–0 tie. At Chicago, Notre Dame beat Northwestern 21–0

November 19 Michigan closed its season with a 3–0 win at Minnesota, Ohio State closed at Illinois with the same 3–0 score. Wisconsin won at Chicago 18–7, and Purdue beat Indiana 25–7. Notre Dame defeated Navy in a game at Cleveland, 12–0. Pittsburgh beat Carnegie Tech, 6–0. In Houston, TCU beat Rice 16–6. Army narrowly beat visiting West Virginia Wesleyan 7–0. At Providence, Colgate (8–0–0) and Brown University (7–0–0) faced each other for the season-ender for both teams. Colgate had held its first 8 opponents scoreless, and the nation waited to see if that streak would be ended by Colgate's toughest opponent of the year. Colgate's Red Raiders won 21–0 to close the season with a 264–0 edge on its opposition.

November 24 On Thanksgiving Day, USC won at Washington 9–6; that win, along with California's 3–0 loss to Washington State, gave USC the Pacific Coast crown and a trip to the Rose Bowl.

November 26 At Yankee Stadium, Notre Dame beat Army 21–0. Pittsburgh beat visiting Stanford 7–0 to close its season unbeaten (8–0–2). Tennessee beat Kentucky 26–0. TCU closed its season at Dallas, with an 8–0 win over SMU. In eleven games, TCU had registered seven shutouts, and finished unbeaten (10–0–1).

== December ==
December 3 In the Army–Navy Game at Philadelphia, Army won 20–0. In Jacksonville, Tennessee beat Florida to close its season unbeaten (9–0–1).

December 6 Jack F. Rissman, sponsor of the original Dickinson System trophy, announced that the Dickinson title and Knute Rockne Memorial Trophy would go to USC with a season-ending win over Notre Dame. Rissman would be attending the game in Los Angeles.

December 10 In Los Angeles, USC (9–0–0) hosted Notre Dame (7–1–0) and won 13–0. That night, going against Rissman's proclamation, Professor Dickinson named 8–0 Michigan as national champions with 9–0 USC No. 2 and 8–0–2 Pittsburgh No. 3.

December 15 Rissman, displeased by Dickinson's choice of Michigan, announced a new Rissman national championship trophy. For 1932, the trophy would go to the winner of the Rose Bowl on January 2.

== 1933 Rose Bowl ==
USC had beaten Pitt in the 1933 Rose Bowl, 47–14, and the rematch three years later resulted in a larger defeat. Before a crowd of 84,000 the previously unbeaten Pitt Panthers reached the "red zone" only twice. In the second quarter, a long run gave the Panthers first down on the USC 24 yard line, but Warren Heller's pass fell in the end zone, and under the rules of the day, the result was a turnover (and a touchback, with USC given first down on the 20). Pitt got another chance soon after on a blocked punt, but was stopped on downs. With the help of holes opened up by Trojan halfback, USC scored five touchdowns (including three in the final quarter) and won 35–0. With New Year's Day falling on a Sunday, the Rose Bowl took place on Monday, January 2, 1933

== Conference standings ==
=== Major conference standings ===
1932 Big Six Conference football standings
	Conf.					Overall
Team	W		L		T	W		L		T
Nebraska $	5	–	0	–	0	7	–	1	–	1
Kansas	3	–	2	–	0	5	–	3	–	0
Oklahoma	3	–	2	–	0	4	–	4	–	1
Kansas State	2	–	3	–	0	4	–	4	–	0
Missouri	1	–	3	–	1	1	–	7	–	1
Iowa State	0	–	4	–	1	3	–	4	–	1
$ – Conference champion

1932 Big Ten Conference football standings
	Conf.					Overall
Team	W		L		T	W		L		T
No. 1 Michigan +	6	–	0	–	0	8	–	0	–	0
No. 4 Purdue +	5	–	0	–	1	7	–	0	–	1
No. 11 Wisconsin	4	–	1	–	1	6	–	1	–	1
No. 6 Ohio State	2	–	1	–	2	4	–	1	–	3
Northwestern	2	–	3	–	1	3	–	4	–	1
Minnesota	2	–	3	–	0	5	–	3	–	0
Illinois	2	–	4	–	0	5	–	4	–	0
Indiana	1	–	4	–	1	3	–	4	–	1
Chicago	1	–	4	–	0	3	–	4	–	1
Iowa	0	–	5	–	0	1	–	7	–	0
+ – Conference co-champions; Rankings from Dickinson System

1932 Border Conference football standings
	Conf.					Overall
Team	W		L		T	W		L		T
Texas Tech	2	–	0	–	0	10	–	2	–	0
Arizona	3	–	2	–	0	4	–	5	–	0
Arizona State	2	–	2	–	0	4	–	3	–	1
Arizona State–Flagstaff	2	–	2	–	0	3	–	2	–	2
New Mexico A&M	1	–	2	–	1	4	–	5	–	1
New Mexico	1	–	3	–	1	1	–	5	–	1
Arizona State and Arizona State–Flagstaff played twice, but only the second meeting counted in the conference standings.

1932 Pacific Coast Conference football standings
	Conf.					Overall
Team	W		L		T	W		L		T
No. 2 USC $	6	–	0	–	0	10	–	0	–	0
Washington State	5	–	1	–	1	7	–	1	–	1
UCLA	4	–	2	–	0	6	–	4	–	0
Washington	3	–	2	–	2	6	–	2	–	2
Oregon	2	–	2	–	1	6	–	3	–	1
California	2	–	2	–	1	7	–	3	–	2
Stanford	1	–	3	–	1	6	–	4	–	1
Oregon State	1	–	4	–	0	4	–	6	–	0
Idaho	1	–	4	–	0	3	–	5	–	0
Montana	0	–	5	–	0	2	–	7	–	0
$ – Conference champion; Rankings from Dickinson System

1932 Rocky Mountain Conference football standings
	Conf.					Overall
Team	W		L		T	W		L		T
Utah $	6	–	0	–	0	6	–	1	–	1
BYU	5	–	1	–	0	8	–	1	–	0
Colorado College	5	–	2	–	0	5	–	2	–	0
Denver	4	–	1	–	1	4	–	3	–	1
Colorado Agricultural	4	–	3	–	1	4	–	3	–	1
Colorado Teachers	2	–	2	–	1	4	–	2	–	1
Utah State	3	–	3	–	0	4	–	4	–	0
Colorado	2	–	4	–	0	2	–	4	–	0
Wyoming	1	–	4	–	1	2	–	6	–	1
Colorado Mines	1	–	5	–	0	1	–	7	–	0
Montana State	0	–	3	–	0	3	–	3	–	1
Western State (CO)	0	–	5	–	0	1	–	5	–	0
$ – Conference champion

1932 Southern Conference football standings
	Conf.					Overall
Team	W		L		T	W		L		T
No. 9 Tennessee +	7	–	0	–	1	9	–	0	–	1
Auburn +	6	–	0	–	1	9	–	0	–	1
LSU +	4	–	0	–	0	6	–	3	–	1
VPI	6	–	1	–	0	8	–	1	–	0
Vanderbilt	4	–	1	–	2	6	–	1	–	2
NC State	3	–	1	–	1	6	–	1	–	2
Alabama	5	–	2	–	0	8	–	2	–	0
Tulane	5	–	2	–	1	6	–	2	–	1
Duke	5	–	3	–	0	7	–	3	–	0
Georgia Tech	4	–	4	–	1	4	–	5	–	1
Kentucky	4	–	5	–	0	4	–	5	–	0
Virginia	2	–	3	–	0	5	–	4	–	0
Ole Miss	2	–	3	–	0	5	–	6	–	0
Georgia	2	–	4	–	2	2	–	5	–	2
Maryland	2	–	4	–	0	5	–	6	–	0
North Carolina	2	–	5	–	1	3	–	5	–	2
South Carolina	1	–	2	–	1	5	–	4	–	2
VMI	1	–	4	–	0	2	–	8	–	0
Washington and Lee	1	–	4	–	0	1	–	9	–	0
Florida	1	–	6	–	0	3	–	6	–	0
Clemson	0	–	4	–	0	3	–	5	–	1
Mississippi State	0	–	4	–	0	3	–	5	–	0
Sewanee	0	–	6	–	0	2	–	7	–	1
+ – Conference co-champions; Rankings from Dickinson System

1932 Southwest Conference football standings
	Conf.					Overall
Team	W		L		T	W		L		T
No. 10 TCU $	6	–	0	–	0	10	–	0	–	1
Texas	5	–	1	–	0	8	–	2	–	0
Rice	3	–	3	–	0	7	–	3	–	0
Texas A&M	1	–	2	–	2	4	–	4	–	2
Baylor	1	–	4	–	1	3	–	5	–	1
SMU	1	–	4	–	1	3	–	7	–	2
Arkansas	1	–	4	–	0	1	–	6	–	2
$ – Conference champion; Rankings from Dickinson System

=== Independents ===
1932 Eastern college football independents records
	Conf.			Overall
Team	W	L	T	W		L		T
No. 5 Colgate		–		9	–	0	–	0
Brown		–		7	–	1	–	0
Columbia		–		7	–	1	–	1
Pittsburgh		–		8	–	1	–	2
No. 8 Army		–		8	–	2	–	0
Drexel		–		5	–	1	–	1
Massachusetts State		–		7	–	2	–	0
Villanova		–		7	–	2	–	0
Duquesne		–		7	–	2	–	1
Fordham		–		6	–	2	–	0
Penn		–		6	–	2	–	0
Temple		–		5	–	1	–	2
Tufts		–		5	–	1	–	2
Cornell		–		5	–	2	–	1
Franklin & Marshall		–		4	–	2	–	1
Boston College		–		4	–	2	–	2
La Salle		–		4	–	2	–	2
Harvard		–		5	–	3	–	0
NYU		–		5	–	3	–	0
Washington & Jefferson		–		5	–	3	–	1
Manhattan		–		6	–	3	–	2
Carnegie Tech		–		4	–	3	–	2
Bucknell		–		4	–	4	–	1
Syracuse		–		4	–	4	–	1
Princeton		–		2	–	2	–	3
Yale		–		2	–	2	–	3
Boston University		–		2	–	3	–	2
Vermont		–		2	–	4	–	1
CCNY		–		2	–	5	–	0
Penn State		–		2	–	5	–	0
Rankings from Dickinson System

1932 Midwestern college football independents records
	Conf.			Overall
Team	W	L	T	W		L		T
Western State Teachers		–		6	–	0	–	1
Michigan State		–		7	–	1	–	0
Western Reserve		–		7	–	1	–	0
Detroit		–		8	–	2	–	0
Michigan Tech		–		4	–	1	–	0
No. 7 Notre Dame		–		7	–	2	–	0
DePaul		–		5	–	1	–	2
Michigan State Normal		–		5	–	2	–	0
Saint Louis		–		5	–	2	–	0
Marquette		–		4	–	3	–	1
Bowling Green		–		3	–	3	–	1
Central State (MI)		–		3	–	4	–	1
Haskell		–		2	–	5	–	1
Detroit City		–		1	–	6	–	0

1932 Southern college football independents records
	Conf.			Overall
Team	W	L	T	W		L		T
Jefferson (TX)		–		8	–	0	–	0
Catholic University		–		6	–	1	–	1
South Georgia Teachers		–		6	–	2	–	0
Western Maryland		–		5	–	1	–	2
George Washington		–		6	–	2	–	1
Texas Mines		–		7	–	3	–	0
William & Mary Norfolk		–		6	–	3	–	1
Troy State		–		5	–	3	–	2
Delaware		–		5	–	4	–	0
Wake Forest		–		3	–	3	–	2
West Virginia		–		5	–	5	–	0
Georgetown		–		2	–	6	–	1
Navy		–		2	–	6	–	1
Tennessee State		–		1	–	4	–	1
Oglethorpe		–		1	–	6	–	0
East Carolina		–		0	–	5	–	0

1932 Western college football independents records
	Conf.			Overall
Team	W	L	T	W		L		T
Columbia (OR)		–		6	–	0	–	1
Saint Mary's		–		6	–	2	–	1
Santa Clara		–		6	–	3	–	0
Gonzaga		–		5	–	3	–	0
Hawaii		–		2	–	1	–	1
Cal Poly		–		4	–	4	–	0
Loyola (CA)		–		4	–	4	–	0
San Francisco		–		2	–	6	–	0
Humboldt State		–		1	–	4	–	0
San Francisco State		–		1	–	7	–	0

=== Minor conferences ===
Conference	Champion(s)	Record
Big Four Conference	Tulsa	3–0
Central Intercollegiate Athletics Association	Morgan College	3–0–2
Central Intercollegiate Athletic Conference	Wichita	5–1
Far Western Conference	Nevada; San Jose State Teachers	2–0–1; 3–0–2
Iowa Intercollegiate Athletic Conference	Luther	4–1
Kansas Collegiate Athletic Conference	Ottawa	4–0
Lone Star Conference	North Texas State Teachers	5–0
Michigan Intercollegiate Athletic Association	Hillsdale	4–0
Michigan-Ontario Collegiate Conference	Adrian; St. Mary's	2–0–1; 2–0–1
Midwest Collegiate Athletic Conference	Carleton; Monmouth (IL); Ripon	2–0–1; 2–0–1; 1–0–1
Minnesota Intercollegiate Athletic Conference	Saint John's (MN)	4–0–1
Missouri Intercollegiate Athletic Association	Northeast Missouri State Teachers	4–0–0
Nebraska College Athletic Conference	Hastings; Nebraska Wesleyan	4–0–1
Nebraska Intercollegiate Athletic Association	Unknown	—
North Central Intercollegiate Athletic Conference	North Dakota Agricultural	4–0–0
North Dakota College Athletic Conference	State Normal and Industrial (ND)	4–0–1; 4–0
Northern Teachers Athletic Conference	Duluth State Teachers; Mankato State Teachers; Moorhead State Teachers; St. Cloud State Teachers	2–1
Ohio Athletic Conference	Case Tech	6–0–0
Oklahoma Collegiate Athletic Conference	Central State Teachers; Southwestern State Teachers (OK)	4–1–0; 4–1
Pacific Northwest Conference	College of Puget Sound	5–0
South Dakota Intercollegiate Conference	Augustana (SD); Black Hills Teachers	5–0; 3–0–1
Southern California Intercollegiate Athletic Conference	Whittier	5–1
Southern Intercollegiate Athletic Conference	Tuskegee	5–0
Southwestern Athletic Conference	Wiley (TX)	5–0
Texas Collegiate Athletic Conference	Howard Payne	5–0
Tri-Normal League	Unknown	—
Wisconsin State Teachers College Conference	Whitewater State Teachers	4–0

=== Minor conference standings ===
1932 Big Four Conference (Oklahoma) football standings
	Conf.					Overall
Team	W		L		T	W		L		T
Tulsa $	3	–	0	–	0	7	–	1	–	1
Oklahoma Baptist	2	–	1	–	0	5	–	4	–	0
Oklahoma City	1	–	2	–	0	5	–	5	–	1
Phillips	0	–	3	–	0	3	–	7	–	0
$ – Conference champion

1932 Big Four Conference (Wisconsin) football standings
	Conf.					Overall
Team	W		L		T	W		L		T
Ripon $	2	–	0	–	1	3	–	2	–	2
Carroll (WI)	2	–	1	–	0	4	–	2	–	0
Lawrence	1	–	2	–	0	3	–	4	–	1
Beloit	0	–	2	–	1	3	–	2	–	2
$ – Conference champion

1932 Buckeye Athletic Association football standings
	Conf.					Overall
Team	W		L		T	W		L		T
Miami (OH) $	5	–	0	–	0	7	–	1	–	0
Ohio	3	–	1	–	0	7	–	2	–	0
Cincinnati	2	–	2	–	0	7	–	2	–	0
Ohio Wesleyan	2	–	2	–	0	5	–	4	–	0
Wittenberg	1	–	4	–	0	3	–	6	–	0
Denison	0	–	4	–	0	2	–	6	–	0
$ – Conference champion

1932 Central Intercollegiate Conference football standings
	Conf.					Overall
Team	W		L		T	W		L		T
Wichita $	5	–	1	–	0	7	–	2	–	0
Pittsburg State	4	–	1	–	1	6	–	1	–	2
Washburn	4	–	1	–	1	6	–	3	–	1
College of Emporia	2	–	3	–	1	2	–	5	–	1
Fort Hays State	2	–	4	–	0	4	–	5	–	0
Southwestern (KS)	1	–	3	–	2	3	–	4	–	2
Emporia Teachers	0	–	5	–	1	2	–	5	–	1
$ – Conference champion

1932 Colored Intercollegiate Athletic Association football standings
	Conf.					Overall
Team	W		L		T	W		L		T
Morgan $	6	–	0	–	1	7	–	0	–	1
Virginia State	6	–	1	–	1	7	–	1	–	1
Virginia Union	6	–	1	–	1	7	–	1	–	1
Hampton	5	–	2	–	1	5	–	2	–	1
Bluefield State	3	–	2	–	0	4	–	4	–	1
North Carolina College	3	–	5	–	0	3	–	5	–	0
Saint Paul's (VA)	3	–	5	–	0	3	–	5	–	0
Howard	2	–	4	–	0	3	–	4	–	0
North Carolina A&T	1	–	5	–	0	2	–	5	–	0
Lincoln (PA)	0	–	2	–	0	0	–	4	–	1
Shaw	0	–	4	–	0	0	–	4	–	2
Johnson C. Smith	0	–	4	–	0	1	–	4	–	0
$ – Conference champion

1932 Dixie Conference football standings
	Conf.					Overall
Team	W		L		T	W		L		T
Mercer	3	–	0	–	0	6	–	2	–	0
Birmingham–Southern $	5	–	1	–	0	5	–	3	–	0
Centre	2	–	1	–	0	6	–	3	–	0
Mississippi College	2	–	1	–	0	3	–	4	–	1
Southwestern (TN)	2	–	2	–	0	4	–	6	–	0
Millsaps	2	–	3	–	0	4	–	5	–	0
Chattanooga	2	–	3	–	0	3	–	6	–	0
Howard (AL)	2	–	4	–	0	3	–	7	–	0
Spring Hill	0	–	5	–	0	0	–	7	–	0
$ – Conference champion

1932 Eastern Pennsylvania Collegiate Conference football standings
	Conf.					Overall
Team	W		L		T	W		L		T
Franklin & Marshall +	2	–	1	–	1	4	–	2	–	1
Gettysburg +	2	–	1	–	1	4	–	3	–	1
Ursinus +	2	–	1	–	1	4	–	3	–	1
Muhlenberg +	2	–	1	–	1	3	–	4	–	2
Dickinson	0	–	4	–	0	1	–	6	–	0
+ – Conference co-champions

1932 Far Western Conference football standings
	Conf.					Overall
Team	W		L		T	W		L		T
San Jose State +	3	–	0	–	2	7	–	0	–	2
Nevada +	2	–	0	–	1	3	–	3	–	2
Chico State	2	–	1	–	0	3	–	5	–	0
Pacific (CA)	2	–	2	–	0	4	–	4	–	0
Cal Aggies	1	–	4	–	0	1	–	8	–	1
Fresno State	0	–	3	–	1	3	–	5	–	2
+ – Conference co-champions

1932 Illinois Intercollegiate Athletic Conference football standings
	Conf.					Overall
Team	W		L		T	W		L		T
Illinois Wesleyan +	6	–	0	–	0	6	–	2	–	0
McKendree +	5	–	0	–	0	9	–	1	–	0
Augustana (IL)	5	–	0	–	1	6	–	0	–	2
Illinois State Normal	6	–	2	–	0	7	–	2	–	0
Bradley	3	–	1	–	1	3	–	3	–	2
Western Illinois	4	–	2	–	1	4	–	2	–	1
St. Viator	2	–	1	–	0	3	–	4	–	1
Shurtleff	5	–	3	–	0	6	–	3	–	0
Millikin	3	–	2	–	0	5	–	2	–	1
Illinois College	3	–	3	–	0	3	–	4	–	0
Northern Illinois State	2	–	2	–	1	4	–	2	–	1
Monmouth (IL)	2	–	2	–	1	4	–	3	–	2
Lake Forest	2	–	2	–	0	4	–	3	–	1
North Central	2	–	4	–	0	4	–	5	–	0
Eureka	1	–	3	–	1	1	–	4	–	1
Wheaton (IL)	1	–	3	–	0	4	–	3	–	0
Southern Illinois	1	–	4	–	1	2	–	5	–	3
Carthage	0	–	4	–	3	1	–	4	–	4
Knox (IL)	0	–	4	–	0	0	–	8	–	0
Elmhurst	0	–	5	–	0	0	–	6	–	0
Eastern Illinois	0	–	6	–	0	1	–	7	–	0
+ – Conference co-champions

1932 Indiana Intercollegiate Conference football standings
	Conf.					Overall
Team	W		L		T	W		L		T
Manchester +	4	–	0	–	0	6	–	1	–	0
Valparaiso +	3	–	0	–	0	7	–	0	–	0
Wabash	4	–	0	–	2	4	–	2	–	2
DePauw	3	–	1	–	1	3	–	4	–	1
Butler	2	–	1	–	0	2	–	4	–	1
Franklin (IN)	4	–	2	–	1	4	–	3	–	1
Hanover	3	–	2	–	1	4	–	3	–	1
Rose Poly	3	–	3	–	0	5	–	3	–	0
Ball State	4	–	4	–	0	4	–	4	–	0
Evansville	2	–	2	–	1	2	–	4	–	1
Indiana State	3	–	4	–	0	3	–	5	–	0
Central Normal	1	–	6	–	0	1	–	7	–	0
Earlham	0	–	5	–	0	1	–	5	–	0
Oakland City	0	–	6	–	0	1	–	6	–	0
+ – Conference co-champions

1932 Iowa Conference football standings
	Conf.					Overall
Team	W		L		T	W		L		T
Luther $	4	–	1	–	0	6	–	2	–	0
Simpson (IA)	4	–	1	–	1	5	–	4	–	1
Central (IA)	5	–	2	–	0	6	–	2	–	0
Iowa State Teachers	3	–	1	–	1	5	–	3	–	1
Upper Iowa	4	–	1	–	0	4	–	2	–	0
Iowa Wesleyan	3	–	2	–	0	5	–	2	–	1
St. Ambrose	5	–	1	–	1	5	–	1	–	2
Morningside	1	–	1	–	0	2	–	6	–	0
Columbia (IA)	1	–	3	–	1	1	–	5	–	1
Dubuque	0	–	3	–	0	1	–	5	–	0
Parsons	1	–	3	–	2	1	–	4	–	2
Western Union	0	–	1	–	0	2	–	4	–	0
Buena Vista	1	–	4	–	0	1	–	7	–	0
Penn (IA)	0	–	8	–	0	0	–	9	–	0
$ – Conference champion; Conference standings were based on Stanley-Dean ranking.

1932 Kansas Collegiate Athletic Conference football standings
	Conf.					Overall
Team	W		L		T	W		L		T
Ottawa $	4	–	0	–	0	7	–	1	–	0
Kansas Wesleyan	3	–	1	–	0	5	–	3	–	0
Baker	2	–	2	–	0	4	–	4	–	1
Bethany (KS)	1	–	3	–	0	1	–	6	–	0
McPherson	0	–	4	–	0	3	–	6	–	0
$ – Conference champion

1932 Lone Star Conference football standings
	Conf.					Overall
Team	W		L		T	W		L		T
North Texas State $	5	–	0	–	0	8	–	1	–	1
Southwest Texas State	3	–	1	–	0	5	–	3	–	0
Trinity (TX)	2	–	1	–	1	5	–	2	–	1
East Texas State	2	–	2	–	1	3	–	4	–	1
Sam Houston State	1	–	4	–	0	2	–	6	–	1
Stephen F. Austin	0	–	5	–	0	2	–	7	–	0
$ – Conference champion

1932 Michigan Intercollegiate Athletic Association football standings
	Conf.					Overall
Team	W		L		T	W		L		T
Hillsdale $	4	–	0	–	0	7	–	1	–	0
Albion	2	–	1	–	1	4	–	2	–	1
Hope	1	–	1	–	2	4	–	2	–	2
Kalamazoo	1	–	2	–	1	4	–	3	–	1
Alma	0	–	4	–	0	1	–	6	–	0
$ – Conference champion

1932 Michigan-Ontario Collegiate Conference football standings
	Conf.					Overall
Team	W		L		T	W		L		T
St. Mary's (MI) +	2	–	0	–	1	3	–	2	–	1
Adrian +	2	–	0	–	1	2	–	6	–	1
Assumption (ON)	0	–	2	–	1	?	–	?	–	?
Detroit Tech	0	–	2	–	1	?	–	?	–	?
+ – Conference co-champions

1932 Middle Atlantic Athletic Association football standings
	Conf.					Overall
Team	W		L		T	W		L		T
Cheyney $	4	–	0	–	2	4	–	1	–	2
Downingtown	4	–	0	–	1	6	–	0	–	1
Storer	3	–	0	–	1	4	–	0	–	1
Bordentown	3	–	3	–	0	4	–	4	–	0
Delaware State	1	–	3	–	0	1	–	5	–	0
Bowie	1	–	4	–	0	1	–	6	–	0
Princess Anne	0	–	6	–	0	0	–	6	–	0
$ – Conference champion; Cheyney was declared by the conference champion based on the Dickinson System.

1932 Middle Three Conference football standings
	Conf.					Overall
Team	W		L		T	W		L		T
Rutgers $	2	–	0	–	0	6	–	3	–	1
Lafayette	1	–	1	–	0	3	–	5	–	0
Lehigh	0	–	2	–	0	2	–	6	–	1
$ – Conference champion

1932 Midwest Conference football standings
	Conf.					Overall
Team	W		L		T	W		L		T
Carleton +	2	–	0	–	1	5	–	2	–	0
Monmouth (IL) +	2	–	0	–	1	8	–	0	–	1
Ripon +	1	–	0	–	1	3	–	2	–	2
Cornell (IA)	2	–	1	–	1	3	–	4	–	2
Beloit	1	–	1	–	1	3	–	2	–	2
Lawrence	1	–	2	–	0	3	–	4	–	1
Coe	1	–	2	–	1	2	–	5	–	2
Knox	0	–	4	–	0	0	–	7	–	0
+ – Conference co-champions

1932 Missouri Valley Conference football standings
	Conf.					Overall
Team	W		L		T	W		L		T
Oklahoma A&M $	3	–	0	–	0	9	–	1	–	2
Creighton	3	–	1	–	0	5	–	2	–	1
Butler	0	–	0	–	1	2	–	4	–	1
Washington University	1	–	2	–	0	4	–	4	–	0
Drake	1	–	3	–	1	2	–	6	–	1
Grinnell	1	–	3	–	0	3	–	4	–	1
$ – Conference champion

1933 Minnesota Intercollegiate Athletic Conference football standings
	Conf.					Overall
Team	W		L		T	W		L		T
Saint John's (MN) $	4	–	0	–	1	6	–	0	–	1
Gustavus Adolphus	3	–	1	–	1	3	–	1	–	1
St. Thomas (MN)	3	–	1	–	0	5	–	2	–	1
Concordia (MN)	1	–	1	–	3	2	–	2	–	3
St. Olaf	2	–	2	–	0	2	–	5	–	0
Hamline	2	–	3	–	0	3	–	3	–	0
Macalester	1	–	3	–	1	1	–	4	–	1
Augsburg	0	–	5	–	0	0	–	5	–	0
$ – Conference champion

1932 Mississippi Valley Conference football standings
	Conf.					Overall
Team	W		L		T	W		L		T
Bethel (TN) $	5	–	1	–	0	7	–	1	–	0
Tennessee Poly	2	–	0	–	1	4	–	0	–	3
Delta State	3	–	1	–	0	4	–	5	–	0
Sunflower Junior	2	–	1	–	0	2	–	1	–	0
Jonesboro College	2	–	2	–	0	5	–	3	–	0
West Tennessee State Teachers	2	–	2	–	0	4	–	5	–	0
Tennessee Junior	1	–	2	–	2	1	–	4	–	3
Lambuth	1	–	6	–	0	1	–	7	–	0
Freed–Hardeman	0	–	3	–	1	1	–	3	–	1
$ – Conference champion

1932 Missouri College Athletic Union football standings
	Conf.					Overall
Team	W		L		T	W		L		T
Missouri Valley $	4	–	0	–	0	6	–	1	–	1
Missouri Mines	1	–	0	–	0	4	–	3	–	1
Central (MO)	3	–	2	–	0	5	–	3	–	0
Tarkio	1	–	2	–	0	3	–	5	–	0
Drury	1	–	3	–	0	1	–	5	–	0
William Jewell	1	–	3	–	0	1	–	6	–	0
Culver–Stockton	0	–	1	–	0	4	–	3	–	0
$ – Conference champion

1932 Missouri Intercollegiate Athletic Association football standings
	Conf.					Overall
Team	W		L		T	W		L		T
Kirksville $	4	–	0	–	0	8	–	0	–	0
Springfield (MO)	2	–	1	–	1	3	–	2	–	2
Maryville (MO)	2	–	2	–	0	4	–	4	–	1
Warrensburg	1	–	2	–	1	4	–	3	–	1
Cape Girardeau	0	–	4	–	0	2	–	6	–	1
$ – Conference champion

1932 Nebraska College Athletic Conference football standings
	Conf.					Overall
Team	W		L		T	W		L		T
Hastings +	4	–	0	–	1	5	–	2	–	1
Nebraska Wesleyan +	4	–	0	–	1	4	–	3	–	1
Midland	2	–	3	–	0	4	–	4	–	0
Cotner	2	–	3	–	0	4	–	5	–	0
Doane	1	–	3	–	1	3	–	4	–	1
York (NE)	0	–	4	–	1	1	–	5	–	1
+ – Conference co-champions

1932 Nebraska Intercollegiate Athletic Association football standings
	Conf.					Overall
Team	W		L		T	W		L		T
Peru State $	3	–	0	–	0	6	–	2	–	0
Omaha	2	–	0	–	1	5	–	2	–	1
Chadron State	2	–	2	–	0	4	–	4	–	0
Wayne State (NE)	0	–	2	–	2	4	–	4	–	2
Kearney State	0	–	3	–	1	2	–	5	–	1
$ – Conference champion

1932 New England Conference football standings
	Conf.					Overall
Team	W		L		T	W		L		T
Maine $	2	–	0	–	1	5	–	1	–	1
New Hampshire	1	–	0	–	1	3	–	4	–	1
Rhode Island State	0	–	1	–	1	2	–	5	–	1
Connecticut	0	–	2	–	1	0	–	6	–	2
$ – Conference champion

1932 North Central Conference football standings
	Conf.					Overall
Team	W		L		T	W		L		T
North Dakota Agricultural $	4	–	0	–	0	7	–	2	–	0
North Dakota	2	–	1	–	0	7	–	1	–	0
South Dakota	1	–	1	–	1	4	–	5	–	1
South Dakota State	1	–	2	–	1	2	–	5	–	1
Morningside	0	–	4	–	0	2	–	6	–	0
$ – Conference champion

1932 North Dakota Intercollegiate Athletic Conference football standings
	Conf.					Overall
Team	W		L		T	W		L		T
Ellendale +	3	–	0	–	0	3	–	0	–	0
Minot State +	4	–	0	–	1	5	–	1	–	1
Wahpeton	2	–	1	–	1	3	–	1	–	1
Dickinson State	2	–	1	–	2	2	–	2	–	2
Jamestown	1	–	1	–	2	1	–	1	–	2
Mayville State	1	–	3	–	0	1	–	3	–	0
Valley City State	1	–	5	–	0	1	–	5	–	0
Bottineau	0	–	3	–	0	0	–	3	–	0
+ – Conference co-champions

1932 North State Conference football standings
	Conf.					Overall
Team	W		L		T	W		L		T
Catawba $	4	–	0	–	0	6	–	2	–	1
Lenoir–Rhyne *	4	–	1	–	0	5	–	4	–	1
Guilford	2	–	2	–	0	3	–	7	–	0
High Point	2	–	3	–	0	2	–	6	–	0
Appalachian State *	0	–	3	–	0	4	–	5	–	1
Elon	0	–	3	–	0	2	–	6	–	0
$ – Conference champion; * — Appalachian State forfeited a win over Lenoir–Rhyne due to an ineligible player.

1932 Northern Teachers College Conference football standings
	Conf.					Overall
Team	W		L		T	W		L		T
Mankato State +	2	–	1	–	0	4	–	1	–	1
St. Cloud State +	2	–	1	–	0	4	–	3	–	0
Duluth State +	2	–	1	–	0	3	–	3	–	0
Moorhead State +	2	–	1	–	0	2	–	5	–	0
Winona State	1	–	3	–	0	3	–	3	–	1
Bemidji State	1	–	3	–	0	2	–	4	–	1
+ – Conference co-champions

1932 Northwest Conference football standings
	Conf.					Overall
Team	W		L		T	W		L		T
Puget Sound $	4	–	0	–	1	7	–	1	–	1
Willamette	4	–	1	–	1	4	–	4	–	1
Pacific (OR)	3	–	2	–	0	4	–	3	–	2
Whitman	3	–	2	–	0	3	–	5	–	0
Linfield	1	–	3	–	0	3	–	5	–	0
College of Idaho	0	–	2	–	0	3	–	3	–	1
Albany (OR)	0	–	5	–	0	0	–	7	–	0
$ – Conference champion

1932 Northwest Ohio League football standings
	Conf.					Overall
Team	W		L		T	W		L		T
Bluffton $	2	–	0	–	1	3	–	2	–	2
Defiance	2	–	1	–	0	3	–	5	–	0
Findlay	1	–	1	–	1	3	–	2	–	2
Wilmington (OH)	0	–	3	–	0	2	–	6	–	0
$ – Conference champion

1932 Ohio Athletic Conference football standings
	Conf.					Overall
Team	W		L		T	W		L		T
Case $	6	–	0	–	0	7	–	2	–	0
Heidelberg	6	–	1	–	0	6	–	1	–	1
Baldwin–Wallace	5	–	1	–	1	6	–	1	–	1
Ohio Northern	3	–	1	–	0	4	–	2	–	1
Toledo	3	–	1	–	0	3	–	4	–	0
Wooster	4	–	1	–	2	5	–	1	–	2
Muskingum	3	–	1	–	1	4	–	3	–	1
Otterbein	4	–	2	–	2	4	–	2	–	2
Marietta	3	–	2	–	1	3	–	2	–	2
John Carroll	3	–	2	–	1	5	–	4	–	1
Dayton	1	–	1	–	0	9	–	2	–	0
Kenyon	2	–	2	–	0	2	–	3	–	1
Akron	1	–	4	–	3	2	–	4	–	3
Capital	1	–	4	–	2	1	–	4	–	2
Oberlin	1	–	3	–	0	2	–	6	–	0
Ashland	1	–	5	–	1	2	–	5	–	1
Hiram	1	–	6	–	0	1	–	6	–	1
Kent State	0	–	5	–	2	0	–	5	–	2
Mount Union	1	–	6	–	0	1	–	8	–	0
Xavier	0	–	1	–	0	3	–	4	–	1
$ – Conference champion

1932 Oklahoma Collegiate Conference football standings
	Conf.					Overall
Team	W		L		T	W		L		T
Central State Teachers +	4	–	1	–	0	6	–	3	–	1
SW Oklahoma State +	4	–	1	–	0	6	–	3	–	0
SE Oklahoma State	2	–	1	–	1	5	–	4	–	1
East Central	2	–	2	–	1	4	–	3	–	2
NW Oklahoma State	1	–	3	–	0	2	–	7	–	0
Northeastern State	0	–	5	–	0	1	–	7	–	0
+ – Conference co-champions

1932 Smoky Mountain Conference football standings
	Conf.					Overall
Team	W		L		T	W		L		T
Carson–Newman $	3	–	0	–	0	5	–	2	–	1
King	4	–	1	–	0	5	–	2	–	1
Tusculum	3	–	2	–	0	5	–	2	–	0
Maryville (TN)	1	–	2	–	0	4	–	5	–	0
East Tennessee State Teachers	0	–	2	–	0	3	–	3	–	1
Milligan	0	–	4	–	0	0	–	6	–	0
$ – Conference champion

1932 South Dakota Intercollegiate Conference football standings
	Conf.					Overall
Team	W		L		T	W		L		T
Augustana (SD) +	5	–	0	–	0	6	–	1	–	0
Spearfish +	3	–	0	–	1	7	–	0	–	1
Northern Normal	3	–	1	–	0	5	–	3	–	0
Yankton	3	–	1	–	2	4	–	2	–	2
Southern Normal	2	–	1	–	2	4	–	1	–	2
Dakota Wesleyan	2	–	3	–	0	3	–	5	–	0
Sioux Falls	1	–	3	–	0	2	–	5	–	0
South Dakota Mines	1	–	3	–	0	1	–	6	–	0
Eastern Normal	0	–	4	–	0	1	–	4	–	0
Huron	0	–	4	–	1	0	–	4	–	1
+ – Conference co-champions; Spearfish and South Dakota Mines played twice. The second game was not counted in the conference standings.

1932 Southern California Conference football standings
	Conf.					Overall
Team	W		L		T	W		L		T
Whittier $	5	–	1	–	0	10	–	1	–	0
Redlands	5	–	2	–	0	7	–	2	–	0
La Verne	5	–	2	–	0	6	–	2	–	0
Occidental	4	–	2	–	1	4	–	4	–	1
Pomona	2	–	4	–	0	2	–	4	–	0
San Diego State	2	–	4	–	1	3	–	5	–	1
Caltech	2	–	5	–	0	2	–	7	–	0
Santa Barbara State	1	–	6	–	0	1	–	6	–	0
$ – Conference champion

1932 Southern Intercollegiate Athletic Association football standings
	Conf.					Overall
Team	W		L		T	W		L		T
Western Kentucky State Teachers $	6	–	0	–	0	7	–	1	–	0
Furman	5	–	0	–	0	8	–	1	–	0
Southwestern (TN)	3	–	0	–	0	4	–	6	–	0
Rollins	2	–	0	–	0	6	–	0	–	1
Loyola (LA)	2	–	0	–	0	6	–	4	–	1
Centenary	1	–	0	–	0	8	–	0	–	1
Louisiana Normal	4	–	1	–	0	7	–	1	–	0
Centre	4	–	1	–	0	6	–	3	–	0
Mississippi College	4	–	1	–	0	4	–	4	–	0
Presbyterian	3	–	1	–	1	5	–	2	–	1
Mercer	5	–	2	–	0	6	–	2	–	0
Murray State	3	–	2	–	1	4	–	2	–	3
Georgetown (KY)	3	–	2	–	0	4	–	5	–	0
Eastern Kentucky	1	–	1	–	1	2	–	1	–	2
Mississippi State Teachers	3	–	3	–	0	5	–	4	–	0
Louisiana Tech	3	–	3	–	0	4	–	4	–	0
The Citadel	2	–	2	–	0	4	–	5	–	0
Middle Tennessee State Teachers	2	–	3	–	0	4	–	6	–	0
Newberry	1	–	2	–	2	2	–	3	–	3
Millsaps	1	–	3	–	0	4	–	5	–	0
SW Louisiana	1	–	3	–	0	3	–	4	–	0
Transylvania	1	–	3	–	1	3	–	5	–	1
Wofford	1	–	3	–	1	3	–	6	–	1
Louisiana College	1	–	4	–	1	2	–	4	–	1
Chattanooga	1	–	4	–	0	3	–	6	–	0
Miami (FL)	0	–	2	–	1	4	–	3	–	1
Louisville	0	–	5	–	0	0	–	9	–	0
Erskine	0	–	6	–	0	1	–	9	–	0
Union (TN)	0	–	6	–	1	0	–	8	–	1
$ – Conference champion

1932 Southern Intercollegiate Athletic Conference football standings
	Conf.					Overall
Team	W		L		T	W		L		T
Tuskegee $	5	–	0	–	0	5	–	1	–	0
Morris Brown	5	–	1	–	1	6	–	1	–	1
Fisk	3	–	1	–	0	6	–	2	–	0
Alabama State	2	–	1	–	1	7	–	1	–	1
Talladega	2	–	1	–	1	?	–	?	–	?
Clark (GA)	3	–	2	–	1	4	–	3	–	1
South Carolina State	2	–	2	–	0	5	–	2	–	0
Morehouse	2	–	4	–	0	3	–	4	–	1
Lane	0	–	1	–	0	?	–	?	–	?
Edward Waters	0	–	2	–	0	?	–	?	–	?
Miles	0	–	2	–	0	4	–	2	–	0
Florida A&M	0	–	3	–	0	5	–	3	–	0
Knoxville	0	–	6	–	0	2	–	7	–	0
$ – Conference champion

1932 Southwestern Athletic Conference football standings
	Conf.					Overall
Team	W		L		T	W		L		T
Wiley $	5	–	0	–	0	9	–	0	–	0
Langston	4	–	1	–	0	6	–	2	–	0
Prairie View	2	–	2	–	1	6	–	3	–	2
Texas College	1	–	2	–	2	?	–	?	–	?
Bishop	1	–	3	–	1	3	–	4	–	1
Samuel Huston	0	–	5	–	0	?	–	?	–	?
$ – Conference champion

1932 Texas Conference football standings
	Conf.					Overall
Team	W		L		T	W		L		T
Howard Payne $	4	–	0	–	0	7	–	1	–	0
Southwestern (TX)	3	–	1	–	0	3	–	3	–	3
Simmons (TX)	1	–	2	–	1	4	–	5	–	1
St. Edward's	1	–	2	–	1	3	–	5	–	2
Austin	0	–	4	–	0	0	–	9	–	0
$ – Conference champion

1932 Texas Intercollegiate Athletic Association football standings
	Conf.					Overall
Team	W		L		T	W		L		T
Texas A&I $	3	–	0	–	0	6	–	2	–	0
West Texas State	3	–	0	–	1	4	–	2	–	2
Sul Ross	3	–	0	–	1	?	–	?	–	?
McMurry	2	–	3	–	0	2	–	4	–	2
Abilene Christian	1	–	4	–	0	2	–	6	–	1
Daniel Baker	0	–	5	–	0	2	–	7	–	1
$ – Conference champion

1932 Tri-State Conference football standings
	Conf.					Overall
Team	W		L		T	W		L		T
Waynesburg $	4	–	0	–	0	8	–	1	–	0
Geneva	3	–	1	–	0	7	–	3	–	0
Westminster (PA)	2	–	2	–	0	4	–	6	–	0
Grove City	2	–	3	–	0	3	–	5	–	1
Thiel	1	–	3	–	0	3	–	6	–	0
Bethany (WV)	0	–	3	–	0	0	–	5	–	2
$ – Conference champion

1932 Virginia Conference football standings
	Conf.					Overall
Team	W		L		T	W		L		T
Richmond $	3	–	0	–	2	4	–	2	–	2
William & Mary	4	–	1	–	0	8	–	4	–	0
Randolph–Macon	2	–	1	–	2	5	–	1	–	2
Hampden–Sydney	1	–	1	–	2	4	–	3	–	2
Roanoke	2	–	3	–	0	4	–	5	–	0
Emory and Henry	0	–	3	–	0	4	–	4	–	1
Bridgewater	0	–	3	–	0	0	–	4	–	0
$ – Conference champion

1932 West Virginia Athletic Conference football standings
	Conf.					Overall
Team	W		L		T	W		L		T
Fairmont State $	4	–	1	–	0	5	–	2	–	1
Glenville State	3	–	1	–	1	4	–	2	–	1
West Liberty State	3	–	1	–	0	7	–	2	–	0
West Virginia Wesleyan	2	–	1	–	1	4	–	4	–	1
Concord	1	–	3	–	1	4	–	4	–	1
Salem	1	–	5	–	0	2	–	5	–	0
Morris Harvey	0	–	4	–	0	0	–	9	–	0
Marshall *	3	–	0	–	0	6	–	2	–	1
Davis & Elkins *	2	–	0	–	0	6	–	5	–	0
Potomac State *	2	–	0	–	1	4	–	1	–	1
New River State *	1	–	1	–	0	3	–	3	–	1
Morehead State *	0	–	1	–	0	4	–	2	–	1
Shepherd *	0	–	2	–	0	4	–	3	–	0
Bethany (WV) *	0	–	2	–	0	0	–	5	–	2
$ – Conference champion; * – Did not qualify for conference standings Ties did not count in conference standings.

1932 Wisconsin State Teachers College Conference football standings
	Conf.					Overall
Team	W		L		T	W		L		T
Whitewater State $	4	–	0	–	0	6	–	1	–	0
La Crosse State	3	–	0	–	1	5	–	0	–	2
River Falls State	3	–	1	–	0	5	–	1	–	0
Superior State	3	–	1	–	0	6	–	2	–	0
Milwaukee State	3	–	2	–	0	5	–	3	–	0
Eau Claire State	2	–	2	–	0	4	–	3	–	0
Stevens Point State	2	–	3	–	0	2	–	5	–	0
Oshkosh State	1	–	3	–	1	2	–	4	–	1
Platteville State	0	–	4	–	0	2	–	4	–	0
Stout Institute	0	–	5	–	0	0	–	6	–	1
$ – Conference champion

== National championship ==
=== Dickinson System ===
For 1932, Professor Dickinson announced that "differential points" would be factored in for an "intersectional game", with ratings of 0.00 for East schools, higher points for "Middlewest" (+4.77) and Southwest (+1.36), negatives for the South (-2.59), the Big Six (-2.60) and the Pacific Coast (-2.71).

Michigan and USC were both unbeaten and untied, but as a "Middlewest" team, Michigan had a higher average rating. The higher weight put four Big Ten Conference teams in Dickinson's top 11: Michigan, Ohio State, Purdue, and Wisconsin.

In 1932, the national championship trophy was presented to the winning school by the Four Horsemen of the 1924 Notre Dame Fighting Irish football team: Harry Stuhldreher, Jim Crowley, Don Miller, and Elmer Layden.

Rank	Team	Record	Rating
1	Michigan	8–0	28.47
2	USC	9–0	26.81
3	Pittsburgh	8–0–2	26.49
4	Purdue	7–0–1	26.33
5	Colgate	9–0	25.00
6	Ohio State	4–1–3	23.60
7	Notre Dame	7–2	20.44
8	Army	8–2	20.00
9	Tennessee	9–0–1	19.16
10	TCU	9–0–1	19.12
11	Wisconsin	6–1–1	18.80

== See also ==
- 1932 College Football All-America Team
