= 1932 in Michigan =

- Decades: 1910s; 1920s; 1930s; 1940s; 1950s
- See also: History of Michigan; Historical outline of Michigan; List of years in Michigan; 1932 in the United States

Events from the year 1932 in Michigan.

== Office holders ==
=== State office holders ===
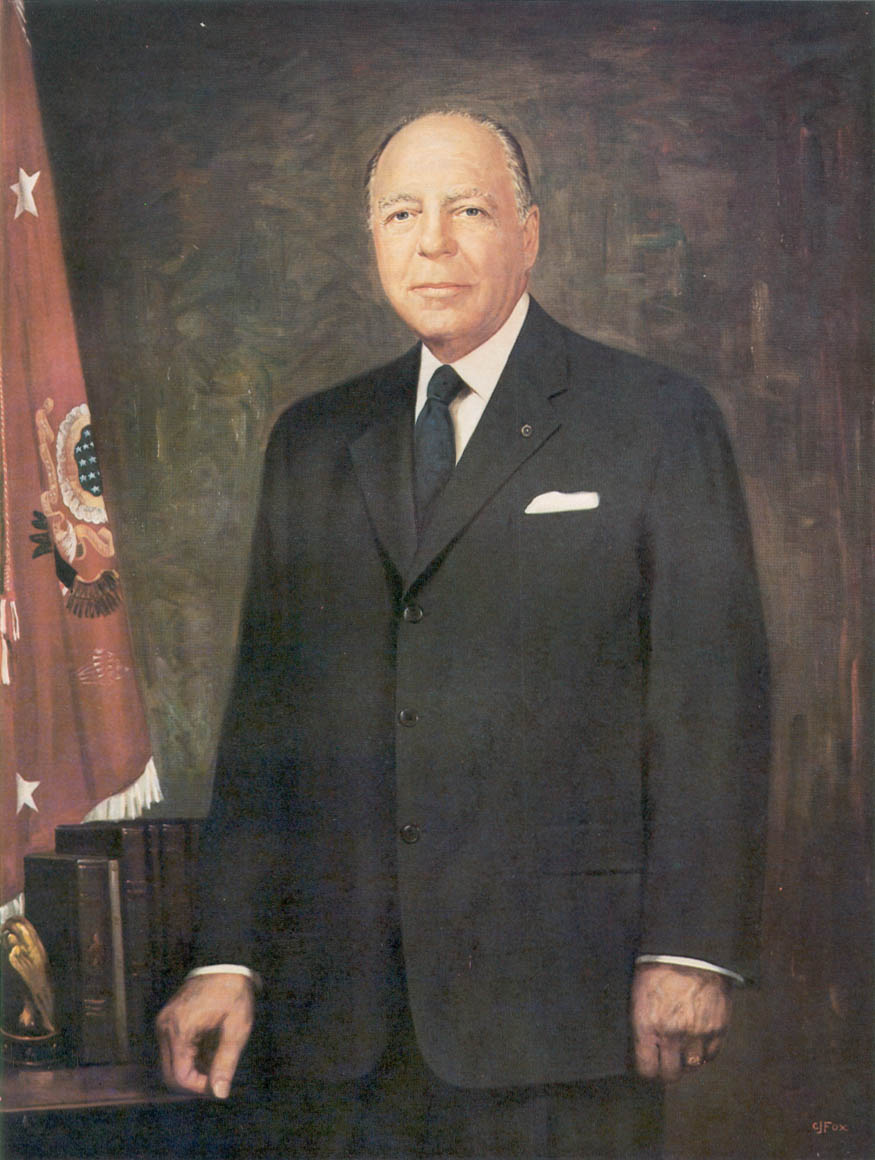
Wilber M. Brucker

- Governor of Michigan: Wilber M. Brucker (Republican)
- Lieutenant Governor of Michigan: Luren D. Dickinson (Republican)
- Michigan Attorney General: Paul W. Voorhies
- Michigan Secretary of State: Frank D. Fitzgerald
- Speaker of the Michigan House of Representatives: Fred R. Ming
- Chief Justice, Michigan Supreme Court: George M. Clark

=== Mayors of major cities ===
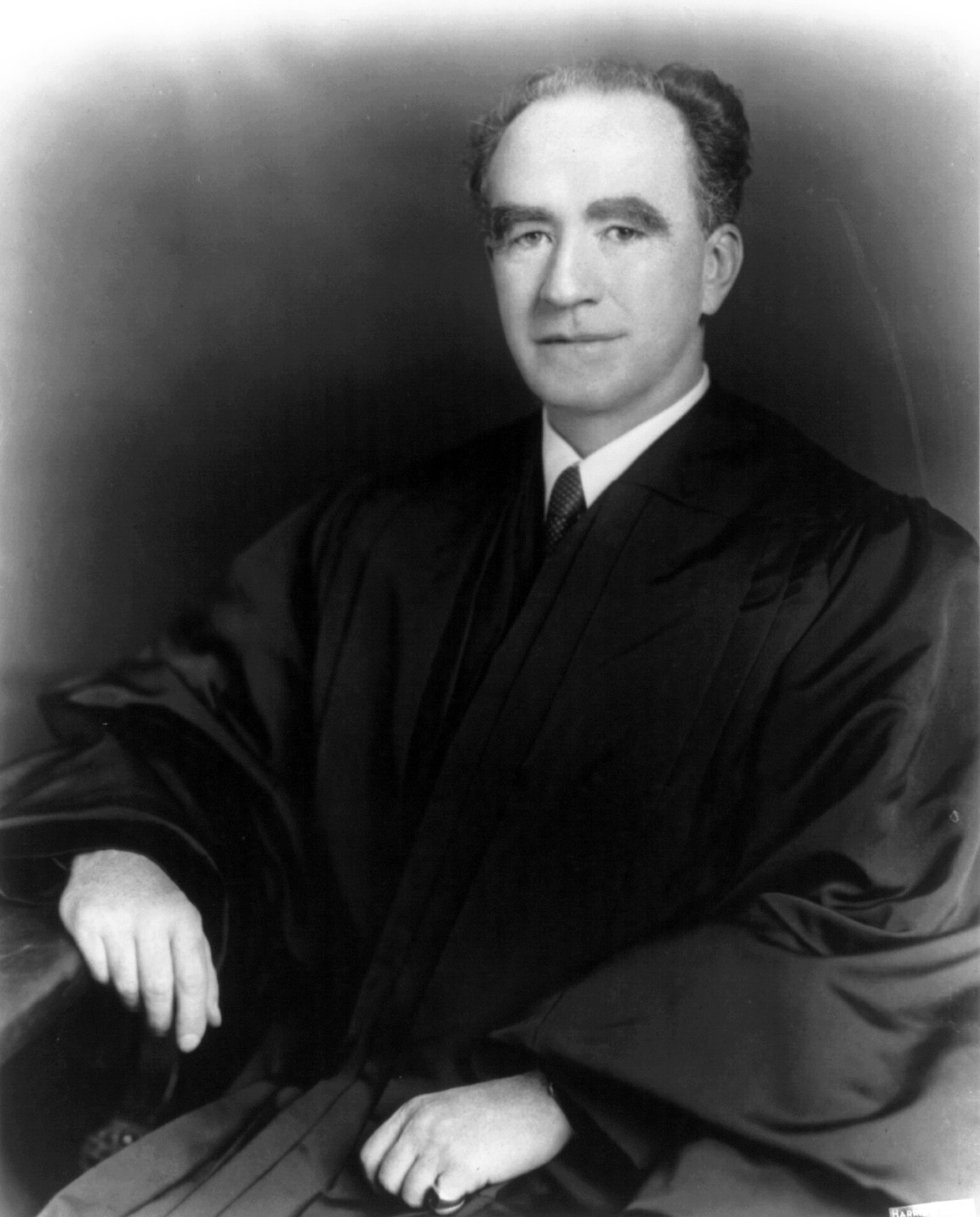
Frank Murphy

- Mayor of Detroit: Frank Murphy (Democrat)
- Mayor of Grand Rapids: John D. Karel
- Mayor of Flint: William H. McKeighan
- Mayor of Saginaw: Ben N. Mercer
- Mayor of Lansing: Peter F. Gray
- Mayor of Ann Arbor: H. Wirt Newkirk

=== Federal office holders ===
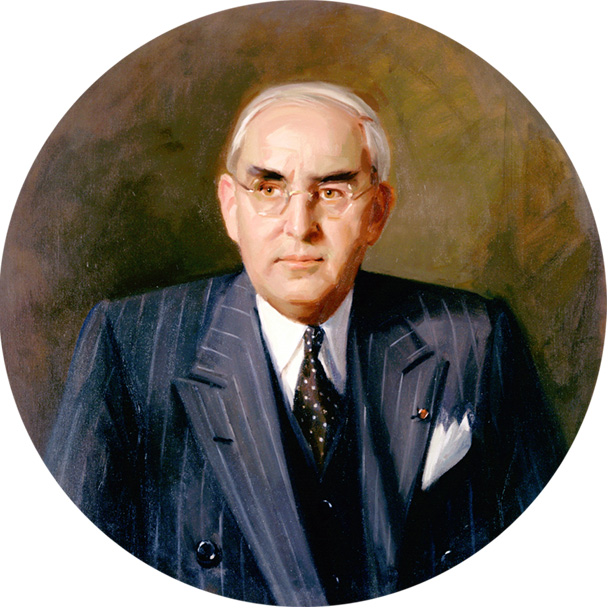
Arthur Vandenberg

- U.S. Senator from Michigan: James J. Couzens (Republican)
- U.S. Senator from Michigan: Arthur Vandenberg (Republican)
- House District 1: Robert H. Clancy (Democrat)
- House District 2: Earl C. Michener (Republican)
- House District 3: Joseph L. Hooper (Republican)
- House District 4: John C. Ketcham (Republican)
- House District 5: Carl E. Mapes (Republican)
- House District 6: Seymour H. Person (Republican)
- House District 7: Jesse P. Wolcott (Republican)
- House District 8: Michael J. Hart (Democrat)
- House District 9: James C. McLaughlin (Republican)
- House District 10: Roy O. Woodruff (Republican)
- House District 11: Frank P. Bohn (Democrat)
- House District 12: W. Frank James (Republican)
- House District 13: Clarence J. McLeod (Republican)

== Population ==
In the 1930 United States census, Michigan was recorded as having a population of 4,842,325, ranking as the seventh most populous state in the country. By 1940, Michigan's population had increased by 8.5% to 5,256,106.

=== Cities ===
The following is a list of cities in Michigan with a population of at least 20,000 based on 1930 U.S. Census data. Historic census data from 1920 and 1940 is included to reflect trends in population increases or decreases. Cities that are part of the Detroit metropolitan area are shaded in tan.

1930 Rank	City	County	1920 Pop.	1930 Pop.	1940 Pop.	Change 1930-40
1	Detroit	Wayne	993,678	1,568,662	1,623,452	3.5%
2	Grand Rapids	Kent	137,634	168,592	164,292	−2.6%
3	Flint	Genesee	91,599	156,492	151,543	−3.2%
4	Saginaw	Saginaw	61,903	80,715	82,794	2.6%
5	Lansing	Ingham	57,327	78,397	78,753	0.5%
6	Pontiac	Oakland	34,273	64,928	66,626	2.6%
7	Hamtramck	Wayne	48,615	56,268	49,839	−11.4%
8	Jackson	Jackson	48,374	55,187	49,656	−10.0%
9	Kalamazoo	Kalamazoo	48,487	54,786	54,097	−1.3%
10	Highland Park	Wayne	46,499	52,959	50,810	−4.1%
11	Dearborn	Wayne	2,470	50,358	63,589	26.3%
12	Bay City	Bay	47,554	47,355	47,956	1.3%
13	Battle Creek	Calhoun	36,164	45,573	43,453	−4.7%
14	Muskegon	Muskegon	36,570	41,390	47,697	15.2%
15	Port Huron	St. Clair	25,944	31,361	32,759	4.5%
16	Wyandotte	Wayne	13,851	28,368	30,618	7.9%
17	Ann Arbor	Washtenaw	19,516	26,944	29,815	10.7%
18	Royal Oak	Oakland	6,007	22,904	25,087	9.5%
19	Ferndale	Oakland	2,640	20,855	22,523	8.0%

=== Counties ===
The following is a list of counties in Michigan with populations of at least 50,000 based on 1930 U.S. Census data. Historic census data from 1920 and 1940 are included to reflect trends in population increases or decreases.

1930 Rank	County	Largest city	1920 Pop.	1930 Pop.	1940 Pop.	Change 1930-40
1	Wayne	Detroit	1,177,645	1,888,946	2,015,623	6.7%
2	Kent	Grand Rapids	183,041	240,511	246,338	2.4%
3	Genesee	Flint	125,668	211,641	227,944	7.7%
4	Oakland	Pontiac	90,050	211,251	254,068	20.3%
5	Saginaw	Saginaw	100,286	120,717	130,468	8.1%
6	Ingham	Lansing	81,554	116,587	130,616	12.0%
7	Jackson	Jackson	72,539	92,304	93,108	0.9%
8	Kalamazoo	Kalamazoo	71,225	91,368	100,085	9.5%
9	Calhoun	Battle Creek	72,918	87,043	94,206	8.2%
10	Muskegon	Muskegon	62,362	84,630	94,501	11.7%
11	Berrien	Benton Harbor	62,653	81,066	89,117	9.9%
12	Macomb	Warren	38,103	77,146	107,638	39.5%
13	Bay	Bay City	69,548	69,474	74,981	7.9%
14	St. Clair	Port Huron	58,009	67,563	76,222	12.8%
15	Washtenaw	Ann Arbor	49,520	65,530	80,810	23.3%
16	Ottawa	Holland	47,660	54,858	59,660	8.8%
17	Houghton	Houghton	71,930	52,851	47,631	−9.9%
18	Monroe	Monroe	37,115	52,485	58,620	11.7%
19	Lenawee	Adrian	47,767	49,849	53,110	6.5%

== Sports ==
=== Baseball ===
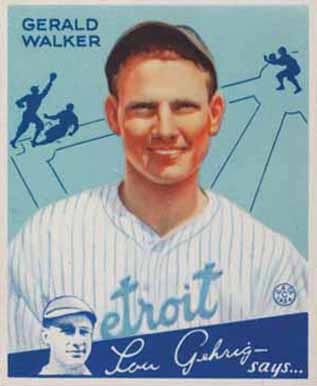
Gee Walker

- 1932 Detroit Tigers season – Under manager Bucky Harris, the Tigers compiled a 76-75 record and finished in fifth place in the American League. The team's statistical leaders included Gee Walker with a .323 batting average, Charlie Gehringer with 19 home runs, John Stone with 109 RBIs, Earl Whitehill with 16 wins, and Tommy Bridges with a 3.36 earned run average.
- 1932 Michigan Wolverines baseball season - Under head coach Ray Fisher, the Wolverines compiled a 19–15–1 record. Art Superko was the team captain.

=== American football ===
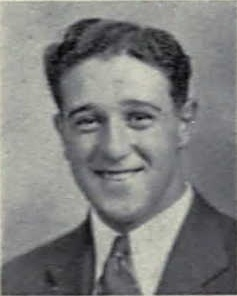
Harry Newman

- 1932 Michigan Wolverines football team – Under head coach Harry Kipke, the Wolverines compiled a perfect 8–0 record, tied for the Big Ten Conference championship, and were selected as national champions under the Dickinson System. Quarterback Harry Newman was a consensus first-team All-American and also won the Chicago Tribune Silver Football as the most valuable player in the Big Ten. Chuck Bernard and Ted Petoskey were also selected as first-team All-Americans by some selectors.
- 1932 Michigan State Spartans football team – Under head coach Jim Crowley, the Spartans compiled a 7–1 record.
- 1932 Western State Hilltoppers football team - Under head coach Mike Gary, the Hilltoppers compiled a 6–0–1 record.
- 1932 Detroit Titans football team – The Titans compiled an 8–2 record under head coach Gus Dorais.
- 1932 Michigan State Normal Hurons football team - Under head coach Elton Rynearson, the Hurons compiled a 5–2 record.
- 1932 Central State Bearcats football team - Under head coach George Van Bibber the Bercats compiled a 3–4–1 record.
- 1932 Detroit City College Tartars football team – The Tartars compiled a 1–6 record under head coach Joe Gembis.

=== Basketball ===
- 1931–32 Western Michigan Broncos men's basketball team – Under head coach Buck Read, the Broncos compiled a 14–5 record.
- 1931–32 Michigan State Spartans men's basketball team – Under head coach Benjamin Van Alstyne, the Spartans compiled a 12–5 record.
- 1931–32 Michigan Wolverines men's basketball team – Under head coach Franklin Cappon, the Wolverines compiled an 11–6 record.
- 1931–32 City College of Detroit (CCD) men's basketball team – Under coach Newman Ertell, CCD (later known as Wayne State) compiled an 11–6 record.
- 1931–32 Detroit Titans men's basketball team – Under head coach Lloyd Brazil, the Titans compiled an 8–8 record.

=== Ice hockey ===
- 1931–32 Detroit Falcons season – Under coach Jack Adams, the Falcons compiled an 18–20–10 record, finished in third place in the National Hockey League (NHL) American Division, and lost in the playoff quarter-finals to the Montreal Maroons. Ebbie Goodfellow led the team with 14 goals, 16 assists, and 30 points. Alec Connell was the team's goaltender.
- 1931–32 Michigan Wolverines men's ice hockey team – Under head coach Ed Lowrey, the Wolverines compiled a 9–6–2 record.
- 1931–32 Michigan Tech Huskies men's ice hockey team – Under head coach Bert Noblet, the Huskies compiled a 6–5–2 record.

=== Other ===
- Port Huron to Mackinac Boat Race –
- Michigan Open -

== Chronology of events ==
=== March ===
- March 7 - Ford Hunger March, a demonstration of unemployed workers starting in Detroit and ending in Dearborn that resulted in four workers being shot to death by the Dearborn Police Department and security guards employed by the Ford Motor Company

== Births ==
- May 26 - Joe Altobelli, Major League Baseball manager (1977-1991), in Detroit
- June 13 - Charles W. Misner, physicist and co-author of Gravitation, in Jackson, Michigan
- December 15 - Curtis Fuller, jazz trombonist in Detroit.
- December 19 - Carl Pursell, U.S. Congressman (1977-1993), in Imlay City, Michigan

=== Gallery of 1932 births ===
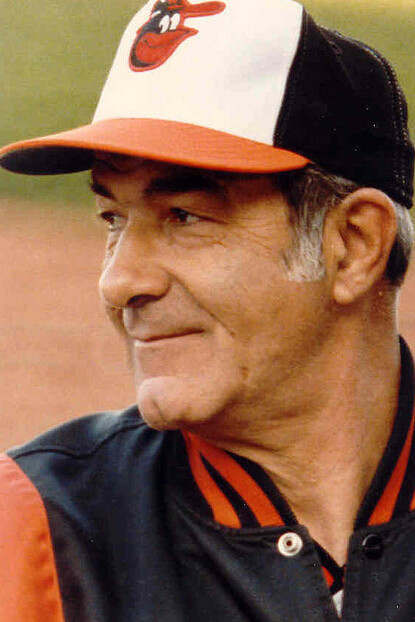
Joe Altobelli

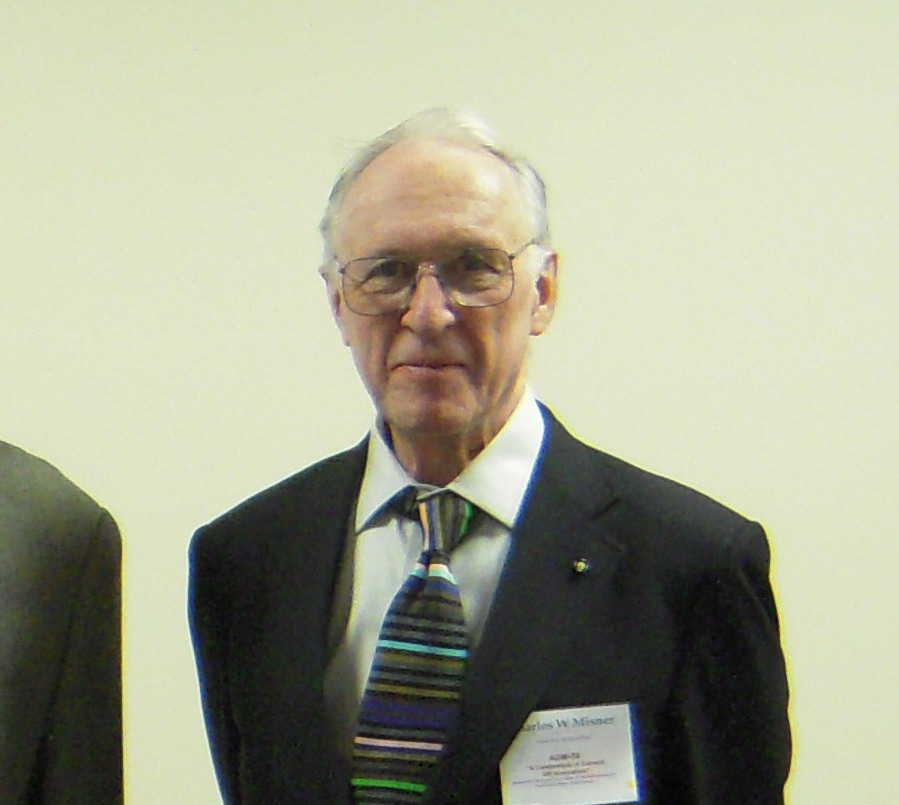
Charles W. Misner

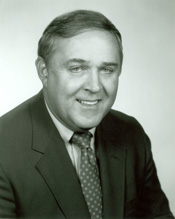
Carl Pursell

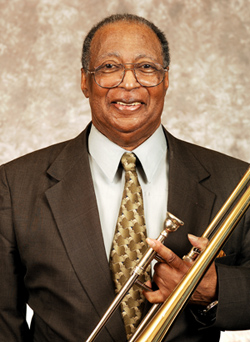
Curtis Fuller

== Deaths ==
- January 8 - Joseph W. Fordney, U.S. Congressman (1899-1923), at age 78 in Saginaw, Michigan
- October 11 - William Alden Smith, United States Senator (1907-1919), United States Representative (1895-1907), at age 73 in Grand Rapids
- October 18 - William E. Upjohn, founder of Upjohn Pharmaceuticals, at age 79

=== Gallery of 1932 deaths ===
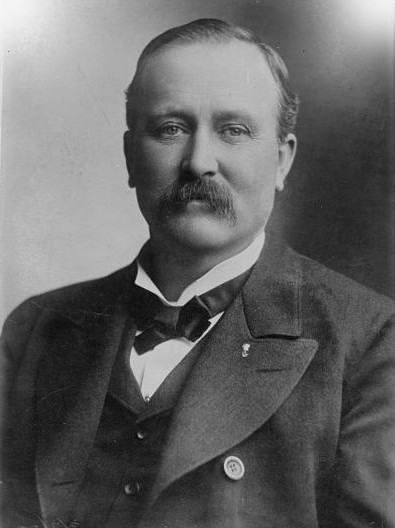
Joseph W. Fordney

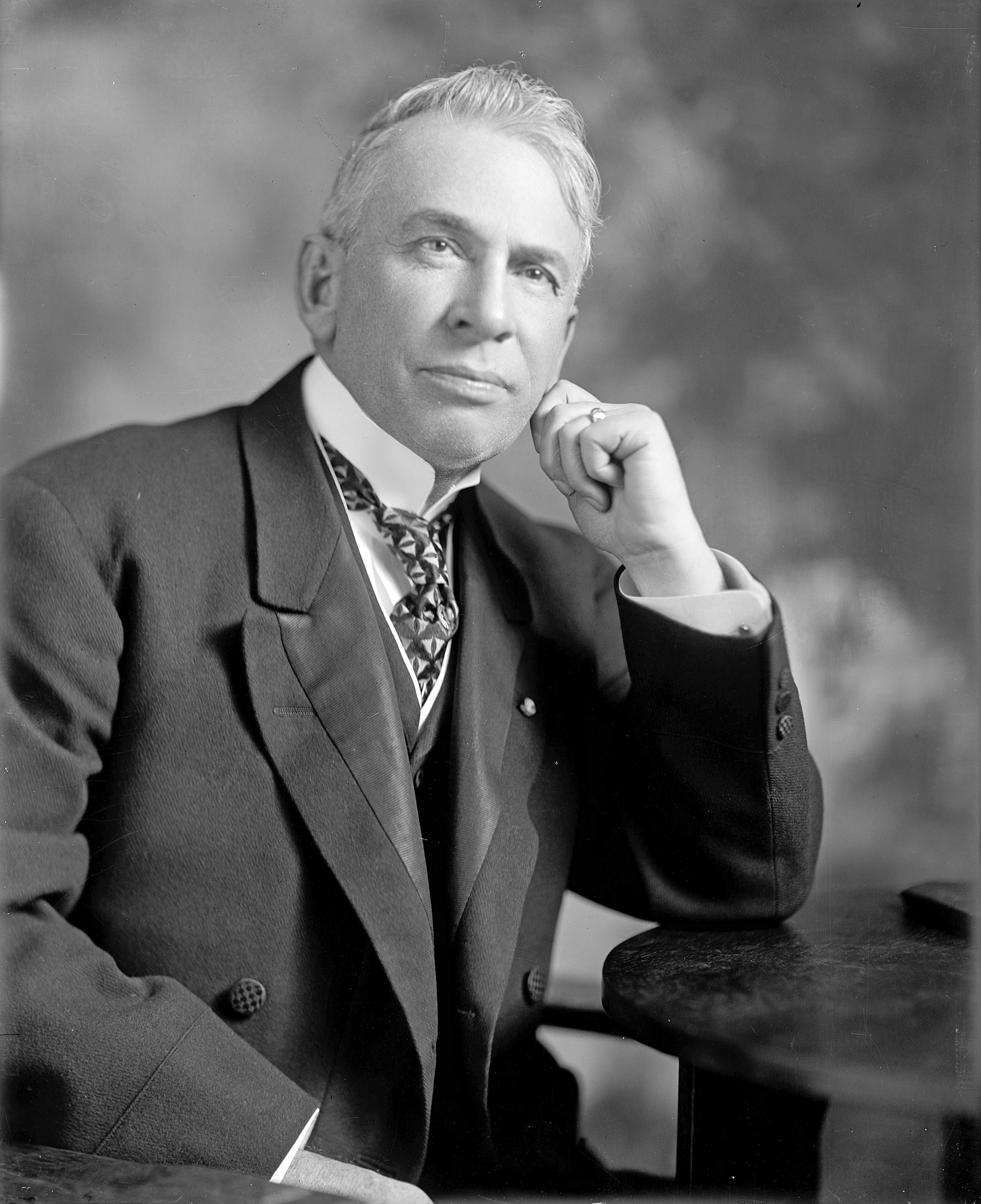
William Alden Smith

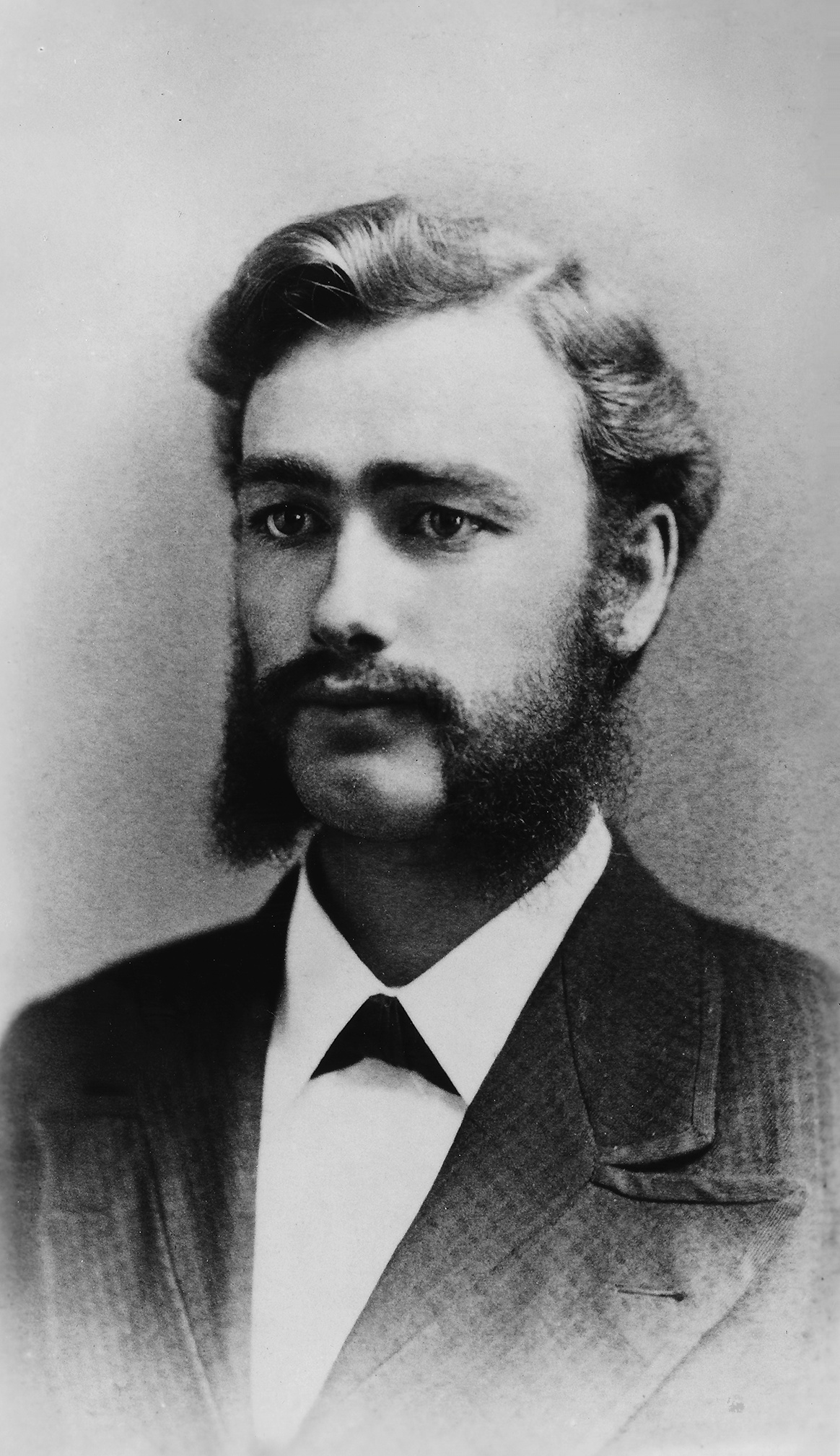
William E. Upjohn

== See also ==
- History of Michigan
- History of Detroit
