= 1932 Notre Dame Fighting Irish football team =

American college football season

1932 Notre Dame Fighting Irish football
- Conference: Independent
- Record: 7–2
- Head coach: Hunk Anderson (2nd season)
- Captain: Paul Host
- Home stadium: Notre Dame Stadium

1932 Midwestern college football independents records
	Conf.			Overall
Team	W	L	T	W		L		T
Western State Teachers		–		6	–	0	–	1
Michigan State		–		7	–	1	–	0
Western Reserve		–		7	–	1	–	0
Detroit		–		8	–	2	–	0
Michigan Tech		–		4	–	1	–	0
No. 7 Notre Dame		–		7	–	2	–	0
DePaul		–		5	–	1	–	2
Michigan State Normal		–		5	–	2	–	0
Saint Louis		–		5	–	2	–	0
Marquette		–		4	–	3	–	1
Bowling Green		–		3	–	3	–	1
Central State (MI)		–		3	–	4	–	1
Haskell		–		2	–	5	–	1
Detroit City		–		1	–	6	–	0

The 1932 Notre Dame Fighting Irish football team was an American football team that represented the University of Notre Dame as an independent during the 1932 college football season. In their second season under head coach Hunk Anderson, the Fighting Irish compiled a 7–2 record, shut out six of nine opponents, and outscored all opponents by a total of 255 to 31. In games against major opponents, they defeated Kansas, Northwestern, Navy, and Army, but lost to Pittsburgh and USC.

Tackle Joe Kurth was a consensus first-team pick on the 1932 All-America college football team. In addition, fullback George Melinkovich received first-team All-America honors from Liberty magazine and Parke H. Davis. Paul Host was the team captain.

The team played its home games at Notre Dame Stadium in South Bend, Indiana.

== Schedule ==
Date	Opponent	Site	Result	Attendance	Source
October 8	Haskell	Notre Dame Stadium; Notre Dame, IN	W 73–0	8,369	
October 15	Drake	Notre Dame Stadium; Notre Dame, IN	W 62–0	6,663	
October 22	Carnegie Tech	Notre Dame Stadium; Notre Dame, IN	W 42–0	16,015–30,000	
October 29	at Pittsburgh	Pitt Stadium; Pittsburgh, PA (rivalry)	L 0–12	55,616–60,000	
November 5	at Kansas	Memorial Stadium; Lawrence, KS	W 24–6	17,818–18,062	
November 12	Northwestern	Notre Dame Stadium; Notre Dame, IN (rivalry)	W 21–0	31,853–42,000	
November 19	vs. Navy	Municipal Stadium; Cleveland OH (rivalry)	W 12–0	61,122	
November 26	vs. Army	Yankee Stadium; Bronx, NY (rivalry)	W 21–0	78,115–80,000	
December 10	at USC	Memorial Coliseum; Los Angeles, CA (rivalry)	L 0–13	93,924–100,000	

== Personnel ==
=== Players ===
Paul Host

Heartly "Hunk" Anderson

- Benjamin Franklin Alexander, center
- Steve Banas, fullback
- Frederick Adolph Bardstow, right tackle
- Raymond Brancheau, right halfback
- Frank Sturla Canale, left end
- Albert Thomas Costello, right halfback
- Hugh Devore, right end
- John James Flynn, right guard
- Tom Gorman, center
- Norm Greeney, right guard
- James Harris, left guard
- Paul Anthony Host, captain and right end
- Chuck Jaskwhich, quarterback and placekicker
- Mike Koken, left halfback
- Edwin Kosky, left end
- Moose Krause, left tackle
- Joe Kurth, tackle
- Frank LaBorne, left halfback
- Michael John Leding, left tackle
- Jim Leonard, fullback
- Nick Lukats, left halfback
- Albert Luke McGuff, left halfback
- George Melinkovich, fullback
- Emmett Murphy, quarterback
- Richard Joseph Pfefferle, right tackle
- Bill Pierce, right guard
- Joseph John Pivarnick, right guard
- Norbert Herman Rascher, right end
- Thomas Gerard Roach, right tackle
- Jack Robinson, center
- Rocco Victor Schiralli, left guard
- Joe Sheeketski, right halfback
- John Edward Tobin, right halfback
- Dominic Vairo, left end
- Laurie Vejar, quarterback
- Bernie Witucki
- Harry Wunsch, left guard

=== Coaching and staff ===
- Head coach: Heartly "Hunk" Anderson
- Assistant coaches: John "Ike" Voedisch, Thomas Yarr, Marchmont Schwartz, F. Nordoff Hoffman
- Freshman coach: Arthur "Jake" Kline
- Assistant freshman coaches: Regis McNamara, Norbert Christman, George Kozac
- Athletic director: Jesse Harper
