= 1932 Haskell Indians football team =

American college football season

1932 Haskell Indians football
- Conference: Independent
- Record: 2–5–1
- Head coach: William Henry Dietz (4th season)
- Captain: Orien Crow
- Home stadium: Haskell Stadium

1932 Midwestern college football independents records
	Conf.			Overall
Team	W	L	T	W		L		T
Western State Teachers		–		6	–	0	–	1
Michigan State		–		7	–	1	–	0
Western Reserve		–		7	–	1	–	0
Detroit		–		8	–	2	–	0
Michigan Tech		–		4	–	1	–	0
No. 7 Notre Dame		–		7	–	2	–	0
DePaul		–		5	–	1	–	2
Michigan State Normal		–		5	–	2	–	0
Saint Louis		–		5	–	2	–	0
Marquette		–		4	–	3	–	1
Bowling Green		–		3	–	3	–	1
Central State (MI)		–		3	–	4	–	1
Haskell		–		2	–	5	–	1
Detroit City		–		1	–	6	–	0

The 1932 Haskell Indians football team was an American football that represented the Haskell Institute (now known as Haskell Indian Nations University) during the 1932 college football season. In its fourth and final year under head coach William Henry Dietz, the team compiled a 2–5–1 record. Louis Weller, John Levi, and Egbert Ward were assistant coaches.

Orien Crow, a Cherokee Indian, was the team captain. Crow was also selected as the first-team center on the 1932 All-Kansas football team. Halfback Robert Holmes was named to the second team.

Prior to the start of the 1932 season, the school announced that it would limit the football team to eight game in order to allow players to focus on classroom work. In addition, the Bureau of Indian Affairs (BIA) terminated junior college offerings at Haskell, with the result that many players were unable to return to the school. After the 1932 season, the BIA announced its opposition to Haskell's "commercialized inter-institutional athletics." Thereafter, Haskell never again reached the heights of big-time college football.

Dietz resigned his Haskell position in March 1933 to accept a job in the National Football League as the head coach of the Boston Redskins (later renamed the Washington Redskins). Assistant coach Weller also left Haskell and played for Dietz's 1933 Boston Redskins.

== Schedule ==
Date	Opponent	Site	Result	Attendance	Source
September 23	Ottawa	Haskell Stadium; Lawrence, KS	W 12–6	> 3,000	
October 1	at Creighton	Creighton Stadium; Omaha, NE	L 0–6		
October 8	at Notre Dame	Notre Dame Stadium; South Bend, IN	L 0–73	10,000	
October 14	Baker	Haskell Stadium; Lawrence, KS	W 25–0	5,000	
October 21	Washburn	Haskell Stadium; Lawrence, KS	L 6–7		
November 4	at Temple	Temple Stadium; Philadelphia, PA	T 14–14		
November 11	at Saint Louis	Walsh Stadium; St. Louis, MO	L 7–20	4,000	
November 24	at Xavier	Corcoran Field; Cincinnati, OH	L 7–20	12,000	
