= 1932 Kent State Golden Flashes football team =

American college football season

1932 Kent State Golden Flashes football
- Conference: Ohio Athletic Conference
- Record: 0–5–2 (0–5–2 OAC)
- Head coach: Merle E. Wagoner (8th season)
- Home stadium: Rockwell Field

1932 Ohio Athletic Conference football standings
	Conf.					Overall
Team	W		L		T	W		L		T
Case $	6	–	0	–	0	7	–	2	–	0
Heidelberg	6	–	1	–	0	6	–	1	–	1
Baldwin–Wallace	5	–	1	–	1	6	–	1	–	1
Ohio Northern	3	–	1	–	0	4	–	2	–	1
Toledo	3	–	1	–	0	3	–	4	–	0
Wooster	4	–	1	–	2	5	–	1	–	2
Muskingum	3	–	1	–	1	4	–	3	–	1
Otterbein	4	–	2	–	2	4	–	2	–	2
Marietta	3	–	2	–	1	3	–	2	–	2
John Carroll	3	–	2	–	1	5	–	4	–	1
Dayton	1	–	1	–	0	9	–	2	–	0
Kenyon	2	–	2	–	0	2	–	3	–	1
Akron	1	–	4	–	3	2	–	4	–	3
Capital	1	–	4	–	2	1	–	4	–	2
Oberlin	1	–	3	–	0	2	–	6	–	0
Ashland	1	–	5	–	1	2	–	5	–	1
Hiram	1	–	6	–	0	1	–	6	–	1
Kent State	0	–	5	–	2	0	–	5	–	2
Mount Union	1	–	6	–	0	1	–	8	–	0
Xavier	0	–	1	–	0	3	–	4	–	1
$ – Conference champion

The 1932 Kent State Golden Flashes football team was an American football team that represented Kent State College (later renamed Kent State University) in the Ohio Athletic Conference (OAC) during the 1932 college football season. In its eighth and final season under head coach Merle E. Wagoner, Kent State compiled a 0–5–2 record.

== Schedule ==
Date	Opponent	Site	Result	Source
September 22	Hiram	Rockwell Field; Kent, OH	L 0–6	
October 8	Otterbein	Rockwell Field; Kent, OH	L 0–19	
October 15	Baldwin–Wallace	Rockwell Field; Kent, OH	L 0–21	
October 22	at Akron	Buchtel Field; Akron, OH (rivalry)	T 0–0	
October 29	at John Carroll	Cleveland, OH	L 0–28	
November 5	at Capital	Columbus, OH	T 0–0	
November 12	Ashland	Rockwell Field; Kent, OH	L 0–6	
