= Fred Mackey =

American football and baseball player and coach (1904–1987)

Biographical details
- Born: April 30, 1904
- Died: July 2, 1987 (aged 83); Sun City, Arizona, U.S.

Playing career

Football
- 1922–1925: Ohio State

Baseball
- 1923–1926: Ohio State
- Positions: Lineman (football); Catcher (baseball)

Coaching career (HC unless noted)

Football
- 1927–1931: Ohio Wesleyan (line)
- 1932–1934: Butler
- 1935–1943: Ohio State (assistant)

Baseball
- 1930–1932: Ohio Wesleyan
- 1939–1944: Ohio State

Head coaching record
- Overall: 10–11–2 (football); 99–75 (baseball)

Accomplishments and honors

Championships
- Football; 1 IIC (1934)

Frederick C. "Fritz" Mackey (April 30, 1904 – July 2, 1987) was an American college football and college baseball player and coach. He served as the head football coach at Butler University from 1932 to 1934, compiling a record of 10–11–2. Mackey was also the head baseball coach at Ohio Wesleyan University from 1930 to 1932, and at his alma mater, Ohio State University, from 1939 to 1944, tallying a career college baseball coaching mark of 99–75.

Mackey played football and baseball at Ohio State, before graduating in 1926. He was also an assistant football coach at Ohio State from 1935 to 1944 and a member of the staff for the national championship-winning 1942 Ohio State Buckeyes football team. After leaving coaching, Mackey worked for an actuary firm. He retired around 1970 to Sun City, Arizona, where he died in July 1987.

== Head coaching record ==
=== Football ===
Year	Team	Overall	Conference	Standing	Bowl/playoffs
Butler Bulldogs (Missouri Valley Conference) (1932–1933)
1932	Butler	2–4–1	0–0–1	3rd	
1933	Butler	2–6	0–2	5th	
Butler Bulldogs (Indiana Intercollegiate Conference) (1934)
1934	Butler	6–1–1	6–0–1	1st	
Butler:		10–11–2	6–2–2		
Total:		10–11–2			
National championship Conference title Conference division title or championship game berth
