= 1932 Oklahoma A&M Cowboys football team =

American college football season

1932 Oklahoma A&M Cowboys football

MVC champion
- Conference: Missouri Valley Conference
- Record: 9–1–2 (3–0 MVC)
- Head coach: Pappy Waldorf (4th season)
- Captain: Jim Turner
- Home stadium: Lewis Field

1932 Missouri Valley Conference football standings
	Conf.					Overall
Team	W		L		T	W		L		T
Oklahoma A&M $	3	–	0	–	0	9	–	1	–	2
Creighton	3	–	1	–	0	5	–	2	–	1
Butler	0	–	0	–	1	2	–	4	–	1
Washington University	1	–	2	–	0	4	–	4	–	0
Drake	1	–	3	–	1	2	–	6	–	1
Grinnell	1	–	3	–	0	3	–	4	–	1
$ – Conference champion

The 1932 Oklahoma A&M Cowboys football team was an American football team that represented Oklahoma A&M College in the Missouri Valley Conference (MVC) during the 1932 college football season. In its fourth year under head coach Pappy Waldorf, the team compiled a 9–1–2 record (3–0 against conference opponents), won the MVC championship, and outscored opponents by a total of 183 to 61. The team played its home games at Lewis Field in Stillwater, Oklahoma. Jim Turner was the team captain.

== Schedule ==
Date	Time	Opponent	Site	Result	Attendance	Source
September 23		Phillips*	Lewis Field; Stillwater, OK	W 13–0		
September 23		Central State Teachers*	Lewis Field; Stillwater, OK	T 0–0		
September 30		Southwestern Oklahoma State*	Lewis Field; Stillwater, OK	W 33–3		
October 7		at Drake	Drake Stadium; Des Moines, IA	W 27–7		
October 14		Creighton	Lewis Field; Stillwater, OK	W 18–7		
October 21	8:00 p.m.	at Oklahoma City*	Goldbug Field; Oklahoma City, OK	W 14–6	7,500	
October 29		Oklahoma*^{†}	Lewis Field; Stillwater, OK (rivalry)	W 7–0	13,000	
November 5		at Tulsa*	Skelly Field; Tulsa, OK (rivalry)	T 0–0	14,000	
November 11		at Jefferson (TX)*	Fair Park Stadium; Dallas, TX	L 6–12	4,500	
November 18		Grinnell	Lewis Field; Stillwater, OK	W 27–0		
November 24		at Arizona*	Arizona Stadium; Tucson, AZ	W 13–6	2,000	
November 28		at Texas Mines*	El Paso, TX	W 20–7		
*Non-conference game; ^{†}Homecoming; All times are in Central time
