= 1934 Butler Bulldogs football team =

American college football season

1934 Butler Bulldogs football

IIC champion
- Conference: Indiana Intercollegiate Conference
- Record: 6–1–1 (6–0–1 IIC)
- Head coach: Fred Mackey (3rd season)
- Captain: Clarence Laymon
- Home stadium: Butler Bowl

1934 Indiana Intercollegiate Conference football standings
	Conf.					Overall
Team	W		L		T	W		L		T
Butler $	6	–	0	–	1	6	–	1	–	1
DePauw	6	–	1	–	0	7	–	1	–	0
Hanover	4	–	1	–	0	7	–	2	–	0
Valparaiso	4	–	1	–	0	6	–	2	–	0
Wabash	4	–	1	–	2	4	–	2	–	2
Earlham	2	–	2	–	0	3	–	4	–	0
Indiana State	3	–	3	–	0	3	–	5	–	0
Evansville	3	–	4	–	1	3	–	4	–	1
Franklin (IN)	3	–	5	–	0	3	–	5	–	0
Manchester	1	–	2	–	0	6	–	2	–	0
Ball State	2	–	6	–	0	2	–	6	–	0
Central Normal	1	–	4	–	0	2	–	5	–	0
Rose Poly	1	–	5	–	0	2	–	6	–	0
Oakland City	0	–	5	–	0	0	–	7	–	0
$ – Conference champion

The 1934 Butler Bulldogs football team represented Butler University as a member of the Indiana Intercollegiate Conference (IIC) during the 1934 college football season. In its third and final season under head coach Fred Mackey, the team compiled an overall record of 6–1–1 with a mark of 6–0–1 in conference play, winning the IIC title.

== Schedule ==
Date	Time	Opponent	Site	Result	Attendance	Source
September 28	8:15 p.m.	Ball State	Butler Bowl; Indianapolis, IN	W 13–4		
October 5		Franklin (IN)	Butler Bowl; Indianapolis, IN	W 25–0		
October 12	8:15 p.m.	Central Normal	Butler Bowl; Indianapolis, IN	W 50–0		
October 19		Indiana State	Butler Bowl; Indianapolis, IN	W 12–0		
October 27		at Wabash	Ingalls Field; Crawfordsville, IN	T 0–0	2,000	
November 3	2:00 p.m.	at Washington University*	Francis Field; St. Louis, MO	L 7–32	2,500	
November 10		Manchester	Butler Bowl; Indianapolis, IN	W 6–0	3,000	
November 17		Valparaiso	Butler Bowl; Indianapolis, IN (rivalry)	W 12–7		
*Non-conference game; All times are in Central time
