= 1932 Marquette Golden Avalanche football team =

American college football season

1932 Marquette Golden Avalanche football
- Conference: Independent
- Record: 4–3–1
- Head coach: Frank Murray (11th season)
- Home stadium: Marquette Stadium

1932 Midwestern college football independents records
	Conf.			Overall
Team	W	L	T	W		L		T
Western State Teachers		–		6	–	0	–	1
Michigan State		–		7	–	1	–	0
Western Reserve		–		7	–	1	–	0
Detroit		–		8	–	2	–	0
Michigan Tech		–		4	–	1	–	0
No. 7 Notre Dame		–		7	–	2	–	0
DePaul		–		5	–	1	–	2
Michigan State Normal		–		5	–	2	–	0
Saint Louis		–		5	–	2	–	0
Marquette		–		4	–	3	–	1
Bowling Green		–		3	–	3	–	1
Central State (MI)		–		3	–	4	–	1
Haskell		–		2	–	5	–	1
Detroit City		–		1	–	6	–	0

The 1932 Marquette Golden Avalanche football team was an American football team that represented Marquette University as an independent during the 1932 college football season. In its eleventh season under head coach Frank Murray, the team compiled a 4–3–1 record and outscored all opponents by a total of 98 to 48. The team played its home games at Marquette Stadium in Milwaukee.

Frank Murray was Marquette's head football coach for 19 years and was posthumously inducted into the College Football Hall of Fame in 1983.

== Schedule ==
Date	Opponent	Site	Result	Attendance	Source
October 1	at Wisconsin	Camp Randall Stadium; Madison, WI	L 2–7	25,000	
October 8	at Creighton	Creighton Stadium; Omaha, NE	T 0–0		
October 15	Lawrence	Marquette Stadium; Milwaukee, WI	W 25–0		
October 22	Boston College	Marquette Stadium; Milwaukee, WI	W 13–0		
October 29	West Virginia	Marquette Stadium; Milwaukee, WI	L 7–34		
November 5	at Detroit	University of Detroit Stadium; Detroit, MI	L 0–7		
November 19	Washington & Jefferson	Marquette Stadium; Milwaukee, WI	W 6–0	3,000	
November 26	Drake	Marquette Stadium; Milwaukee, WI	W 45–0		
