= 1932 Creighton Bluejays football team =

American college football season

1932 Creighton Bluejays football
- Conference: Missouri Valley Conference
- Record: 5–2–1 (3–1 MVC)
- Head coach: Arthur R. Stark (3rd season)
- Home stadium: Creighton Stadium

1932 Missouri Valley Conference football standings
| | Conf. | | | | | Overall |
| Team | W | | L | | T | W | | L | | T |
|---|---|---|---|---|---|---|---|---|---|---|
| Oklahoma A&M $ | 3 | – | 0 | – | 0 | 9 | – | 1 | – | 2 |
| Creighton | 3 | – | 1 | – | 0 | 5 | – | 2 | – | 1 |
| Butler | 0 | – | 0 | – | 1 | 2 | – | 4 | – | 1 |
| Washington University | 1 | – | 2 | – | 0 | 4 | – | 4 | – | 0 |
| Drake | 1 | – | 3 | – | 1 | 2 | – | 6 | – | 1 |
| Grinnell | 1 | – | 3 | – | 0 | 3 | – | 4 | – | 1 |
$ – Conference champion

The 1932 Creighton Bluejays football team was an American football team that represented Creighton University as a member of the Missouri Valley Conference (MVC) during the 1932 college football season. In its third season under head coach Arthur R. Stark, the team compiled a 5–2–1 record (3–1 against MVC opponents) and outscored opponents by a total of 115 to 65. The team played its home games at Creighton Stadium in Omaha, Nebraska.

== Schedule ==
| Date | Opponent | Site | Result | Source |
|---|---|---|---|---|
| October 1 | Haskell* | Creighton Stadium; Omaha, NE | W 6–0 | |
| October 8 | Marquette* | Creighton Stadium; Omaha, NE | T 0–0 | |
| October 14 | at Oklahoma A&M | Lewis Field; Stillwater, OK | L 7–18 | |
| October 22 | Drake | Creighton Stadium; Omaha, NE | W 12–0 | |
| October 29 | at Rice* | Rice Field; Houston, TX | L 7–41 | |
| November 5 | at Washington (MO) | Francis Field; St. Louis, MO | W 40–0 | |
| November 11 | at Grinnell | Grinnell, IA | W 9–6 | |
| November 19 | Wyoming* | Creighton Stadium; Omaha, NE | W 34–0 | |
*Non-conference game
