= 1932 Iowa State Cyclones football team =

American college football season

1932 Iowa State Cyclones football
- Conference: Big Six Conference
- Record: 3–4–1 (0–4–1 Big 6)
- Head coach: George F. Veenker (2nd season)
- Captain: Dick Grefe
- Home stadium: State Field

1932 Big Six Conference football standings
	Conf.					Overall
Team	W		L		T	W		L		T
Nebraska $	5	–	0	–	0	7	–	1	–	1
Kansas	3	–	2	–	0	5	–	3	–	0
Oklahoma	3	–	2	–	0	4	–	4	–	1
Kansas State	2	–	3	–	0	4	–	4	–	0
Missouri	1	–	3	–	1	1	–	7	–	1
Iowa State	0	–	4	–	1	3	–	4	–	1
$ – Conference champion

The 1932 Iowa State Cyclones football team represented Iowa State College of Agricultural and Mechanic Arts (later renamed Iowa State University) in the Big Six Conference during the 1932 college football season. In their second season under head coach George F. Veenker, the Cyclones compiled a 3–4–1 record (0–4–1 against conference opponents), finished in last place in the conference, and outscored their opponents by a combined total of 105 to 101. They played their home games at State Field in Ames, Iowa.

Dick Grefe was the team captain. No Iowa State player was selected as a first-team all-conference player.

== Schedule ==
Date	Time	Opponent	Site	Result	Attendance	Source
September 24	3:00 pm	Simpson*	State Field; Ames, IA	W 21–0	2,333	
October 1	2:00 pm	Morningside*	State Field; Ames, IA	W 32–0	2,297	
October 8	2:00 pm	at Nebraska	Memorial Stadium; Lincoln, NE (rivalry)	L 6–12	9,222	
October 15	2:00 pm	Kansas^{†}	State Field; Ames, IA	L 0–26	4,483	
October 22	2:00 pm	at Missouri	Memorial Stadium; Columbia, MO (rivalry)	T 0–0	6,000	
November 5	2:00 pm	at Kansas State	Memorial Stadium; Manhattan, KS (rivalry)	L 0–31	5,574	
November 12	2:00 pm	Oklahoma	State Field; Ames, IA	L 12–19	1,620	
November 19	2:00 pm	Drake*	State Field; Ames, IA	W 34–13	2,679	
*Non-conference game; ^{†}Homecoming; All times are in Central time
