= 1932 DePaul Blue Demons football team =

American college football season

1932 DePaul Blue Demons football
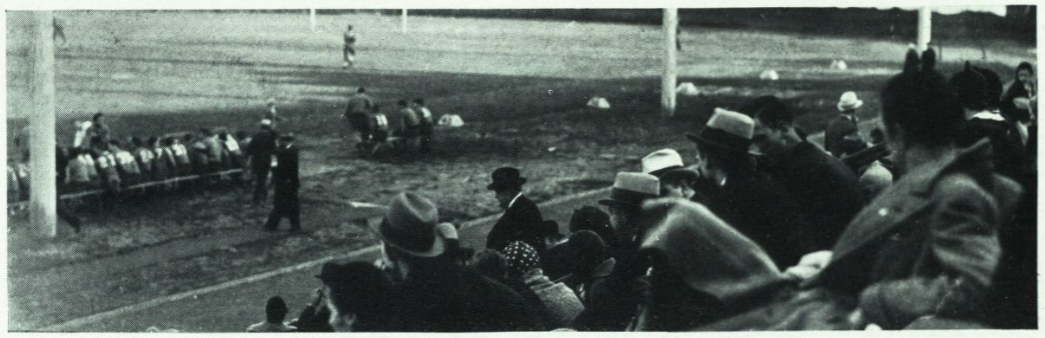
- DePaul defeats Omaha on October 29.
- Conference: Independent
- Record: 5–1–2
- Head coach: Jim Kelly & Ben Connor (1st season)
- Home stadium: Loyola Stadium

1932 Midwestern college football independents records
	Conf.			Overall
Team	W	L	T	W		L		T
Western State Teachers		–		6	–	0	–	1
Michigan State		–		7	–	1	–	0
Western Reserve		–		7	–	1	–	0
Detroit		–		8	–	2	–	0
Michigan Tech		–		4	–	1	–	0
No. 7 Notre Dame		–		7	–	2	–	0
DePaul		–		5	–	1	–	2
Michigan State Normal		–		5	–	2	–	0
Saint Louis		–		5	–	2	–	0
Marquette		–		4	–	3	–	1
Bowling Green		–		3	–	3	–	1
Central State (MI)		–		3	–	4	–	1
Haskell		–		2	–	5	–	1
Detroit City		–		1	–	6	–	0

The 1932 DePaul Blue Demons football team was an American football team that represented DePaul University as an independent during the 1932 college football season. The team compiled a 5–1–2 record and outscored opponents by a total of 96 to 34. Jim Kelly and Ben Connor were the team's coaches.

== Schedule ==
Date	Opponent	Site	Result	Attendance	Source
September 23	St. Viator	Loyola Stadium; Chicago, IL	W 13–6	1,500	
September 30	Illinois Wesleyan	Loyola Stadium; Chicago, IL	W 6–2		
October 7	Western State Teachers (MI)	Loyola Stadium; Chicago, IL	T 0–0		
October 15	Ripon	Loyola Stadium; Chicago, IL	W 18–0		
October 23	at Saint Mary's (MN)	Winona, MN	W 19–7		
October 29	at Omaha	Omaha, NE	W 34–6		
November 13	at St. Thomas (MN)	St. Paul, MN	T 0–0		
November 19	North Dakota^{†}	Loyola Stadium; Chicago, IL	L 6–13	5,000	
^{†}Homecoming
