= 1932 Dayton Flyers football team =

American college football season

1932 Dayton Flyers football
- Conference: Ohio Athletic Conference
- Record: 9–2 (1–1 OAC)
- Head coach: Harry Baujan (10th season)
- Home stadium: University of Dayton Stadium

1932 Ohio Athletic Conference football standings
	Conf.					Overall
Team	W		L		T	W		L		T
Case $	6	–	0	–	0	7	–	2	–	0
Heidelberg	6	–	1	–	0	6	–	1	–	1
Baldwin–Wallace	5	–	1	–	1	6	–	1	–	1
Ohio Northern	3	–	1	–	0	4	–	2	–	1
Toledo	3	–	1	–	0	3	–	4	–	0
Wooster	4	–	1	–	2	5	–	1	–	2
Muskingum	3	–	1	–	1	4	–	3	–	1
Otterbein	4	–	2	–	2	4	–	2	–	2
Marietta	3	–	2	–	1	3	–	2	–	2
John Carroll	3	–	2	–	1	5	–	4	–	1
Dayton	1	–	1	–	0	9	–	2	–	0
Kenyon	2	–	2	–	0	2	–	3	–	1
Akron	1	–	4	–	3	2	–	4	–	3
Capital	1	–	4	–	2	1	–	4	–	2
Oberlin	1	–	3	–	0	2	–	6	–	0
Ashland	1	–	5	–	1	2	–	5	–	1
Hiram	1	–	6	–	0	1	–	6	–	1
Kent State	0	–	5	–	2	0	–	5	–	2
Mount Union	1	–	6	–	0	1	–	8	–	0
Xavier	0	–	1	–	0	3	–	4	–	1
$ – Conference champion

The 1932 Dayton Flyers football team was an American football team that represented the University of Dayton as a member of the Ohio Athletic Conference during the 1932 college football season. In its tenth season under head coach Harry Baujan, the team compiled a 9–2 record.

== Schedule ==
Date	Opponent	Site	Result	Attendance	Source
September 23	Findlay	University of Dayton Stadium; Dayton, OH	W 33–0	5,500	
September 30	Adrian	University of Dayton Stadium; Dayton, OH	W 64–0		
October 1	at Wilmington	Wilmington, OH	W 13–7		
October 7	Quantico Marines	University of Dayton Stadium; Dayton, OH	W 21–14	4,500	
October 14	Xavier	Corcoran Field; Cincinnati, OH	W 7–0		
October 21	Marshall	University of Dayton Stadium; Dayton, OH	W 13–7		
October 28	Morris-Harvey	University of Dayton Stadium; Dayton, OH	W 18–0		
November 5	John Carroll^{†}	University of Dayton Stadium; Dayton, OH	L 0–7		
November 12	at Butler	Indianapolis, IN	W 7–0	10,000	
November 24	Wittenberg	University of Dayton Stadium; Dayton, OH	L 6–7		
December 3	Davis & Elkins	University of Dayton Stadium; Dayton, OH	W 7–0	2,776	
^{†}Homecoming
