= 1932 Oklahoma Sooners football team =

American college football season

1932 Oklahoma Sooners football
- Conference: Big Six Conference
- Record: 4–4–1 (3–2 Big 6)
- Head coach: Lewie Hardage (1st season)
- Captain: Paul Young
- Home stadium: Memorial Stadium

1932 Big Six Conference football standings
	Conf.					Overall
Team	W		L		T	W		L		T
Nebraska $	5	–	0	–	0	7	–	1	–	1
Kansas	3	–	2	–	0	5	–	3	–	0
Oklahoma	3	–	2	–	0	4	–	4	–	1
Kansas State	2	–	3	–	0	4	–	4	–	0
Missouri	1	–	3	–	1	1	–	7	–	1
Iowa State	0	–	4	–	1	3	–	4	–	1
$ – Conference champion

The 1932 Oklahoma Sooners football team represented the University of Oklahoma in the 1932 college football season. In their first year under head coach Lewie Hardage, the Sooners compiled a 4–4–1 record (3–2 against conference opponents), finished in a tie for second place in the Big Six Conference, and outscored their opponents by a combined total of 90 to 81.

No Sooners received All-America honors in 1932, but two Sooners received all-conference honors: guard Ellis Bashara and back Bob Dunlap.

== Schedule ==
Date	Opponent	Site	Result	Attendance	Source
October 1	Tulsa*	Memorial Stadium; Norman, OK	W 7–0		
October 8	at Kansas	Memorial Stadium; Lawrence, KS	W 21–6		
October 15	vs. Texas*	Fair Park Stadium; Dallas, TX (rivalry)	L 10–17		
October 22	Kansas State	Memorial Stadium; Norman, OK	W 20–13		
October 29	at Oklahoma A&M*	Lewis Field; Stillwater, OK (Bedlam)	L 0–7		
November 5	Missouri	Memorial Stadium; Norman, OK (rivalry)	L 6–14		
November 12	at Iowa State	State Field; Ames, IA	W 19–13	1,620	
November 19	Nebraska	Memorial Stadium; Norman, OK (rivalry)	L 0–5	10,432	
November 24	at George Washington*	Griffith Stadium; Washington, DC	T 7–7	19,000	
*Non-conference game
