= 1932 Saint Louis Billikens football team =

American college football season

1932 Saint Louis Billikens football

Missouri state champion
- Conference: Independent
- Record: 5–2
- Head coach: Chile Walsh (3rd season)
- Home stadium: Walsh Stadium

1932 Midwestern college football independents records
	Conf.			Overall
Team	W	L	T	W		L		T
Western State Teachers		–		6	–	0	–	1
Michigan State		–		7	–	1	–	0
Western Reserve		–		7	–	1	–	0
Detroit		–		8	–	2	–	0
Michigan Tech		–		4	–	1	–	0
No. 7 Notre Dame		–		7	–	2	–	0
DePaul		–		5	–	1	–	2
Michigan State Normal		–		5	–	2	–	0
Saint Louis		–		5	–	2	–	0
Marquette		–		4	–	3	–	1
Bowling Green		–		3	–	3	–	1
Central State (MI)		–		3	–	4	–	1
Haskell		–		2	–	5	–	1
Detroit City		–		1	–	6	–	0

The 1932 Saint Louis Billikens football team was an American football team that represented Saint Louis University as an independent during the 1932 college football season. In its third season under head coach Chile Walsh, the team compiled a 5–2 record and outscored opponents by a total of 103 to 50. The team beat both Washington University and Missouri to win the Missouri state championship. Home games were played at Walsh Stadium in St. Louis.

== Schedule ==
Date	Opponent	Site	Result	Attendance	Source
October 1	McKendree	Walsh Stadium; St. Louis, MO	W 25–0	5,000	
October 7	Wyoming	Walsh Stadium; St. Louis, MO	W 20–6		
October 21	at Loyola (LA)	Loyola Stadium; New Orleans, LA	L 0–19		
October 28	Kansas	Walsh Stadium; St. Louis, MO	L 0–6	11,000	
November 11	Haskell	Walsh Stadium; St. Louis, MO	W 20–7	4,000	
November 24	Washington University	Walsh Stadium; St. Louis, MO	W 19–6	17,500	
December 3	Missouri	Walsh Stadium; St. Louis, MO	W 19–6	9,000	
