= 1932 Nebraska Cornhuskers football team =

American college football season

1932 Nebraska Cornhuskers football

Big 6 champion
- Conference: Big Six Conference
- Record: 7–1–1 (5–0 Big 6)
- Head coach: Dana X. Bible (4th season)
- Home stadium: Memorial Stadium

1932 Big Six Conference football standings
	Conf.					Overall
Team	W		L		T	W		L		T
Nebraska $	5	–	0	–	0	7	–	1	–	1
Kansas	3	–	2	–	0	5	–	3	–	0
Oklahoma	3	–	2	–	0	4	–	4	–	1
Kansas State	2	–	3	–	0	4	–	4	–	0
Missouri	1	–	3	–	1	1	–	7	–	1
Iowa State	0	–	4	–	1	3	–	4	–	1
$ – Conference champion

The 1932 Nebraska Cornhuskers football team was an American football team that represented the University of Nebraska in the Big Six Conference during the 1932 college football season. In its fourth season under head coach Dana X. Bible, the team compiled a 7–1–1 record (5–0 against conference opponents), won the Big Six championship, and outscored opponents by a total of 105 to 52. The team played its home games at Memorial Stadium in Lincoln, Nebraska.

== Before the season ==
Coach Bible began his third season at Nebraska with two conference titles to his credit, as Nebraska held two of the three titles awarded since the Big 6 Conference came into being after evolving from the Missouri Valley Intercollegiate Athletic Association 1929, and three of the last four conference titles overall. Assistant coaches Day and Lehman did not return for 1932, but former head coach and later assistant coach for the linemen, Henry Schulte, who had never left the university while coaching for other sports, returned to the football staff by taking up his old position as lineman coach. Two new assistants also came aboard to assist with the freshman team. Nebraska's domination of the Big 6 made them favorites to win the title again in 1932.

== Schedule ==
Date	Time	Opponent	Site	Result	Attendance	Source
October 8	2:00 p.m.	Iowa State	Memorial Stadium; Lincoln, NE (rivalry)	W 12–6	9,222	
October 15	2:00 p.m.	at Minnesota	Memorial Stadium; Minneapolis, MN (rivalry)	L 6–7	18,000–18,420	
October 22	2:00 p.m.	at Kansas	Memorial Stadium; Lawrence, KS (rivalry)	W 20–6	8,771	
October 29	2:00 p.m.	Kansas State^{†}	Memorial Stadium; Lincoln, NE (rivalry)	W 6–0	15,193	
November 5	2:00 p.m.	at Iowa*	Iowa Stadium; Iowa City, IA (rivalry)	W 14–13	3,000–6,000	
November 12	2:00 p.m.	Pittsburgh*	Memorial Stadium; Lincoln, NE	T 0–0	24,720	
November 19	2:00 p.m.	at Oklahoma	Memorial Stadium; Norman, OK (rivalry)	W 5–0	10,432	
November 24	2:00 p.m.	Missouri	Memorial Stadium; Lincoln, NE (rivalry)	W 42–12	14,034	
December 3	2:00 p.m.	at SMU*	Ownby Stadium; Dallas, TX	W 21–14	2,500	
*Non-conference game; ^{†}Homecoming; All times are in Central time

== Roster ==
Bishop, Clair #16 G Boswell, Hubert #13 HB; Campbell, Clare #58 G Copple, Leland #79 E DeBus, Warren #83 G Dreier, William #49 T Eldridge, Ralph #82 HB; Ely, Lawrence #37 C Fahrnbruch, Theodore #14 FB; Hokuf, Stephen #44 E Hubka, Elmer #88 G Hulbert, Corwin #42 T Jones, Glenn #25 C Joy, Robert #47 E Kilbourne, Bruce #77 E Masterson, Bernard #39 QB	Mathis, Chris #73 QB; Mehring, Neal #28 G Meier, Franklin #33 C Miller, Jack #78 QB; Murray, Fred #29 FB; O'Brien, Gail #60 T Overstreet, Fred #81 HB; Parsons, Rollin #48 HB; Penny, Thomas Lee #46 E Pflum, Walter #86 T Roby, John #10 E Sauer, George #80 FB; Schlueter, Ulysses #56 T Scoggan, Warren #40 T Scott, Marian #34 E Staab, Carlyle #72 FB

== Coaching staff ==
Name	Title	First year in this position	Years at Nebraska	Alma mater
Dana X. Bible	Head coach	1929	1929–1936	Carson-Newman
Henry Schulte	Lineman Coach	1931	1919–1924, 1931–1937	Michigan
Ed Weir	Freshmen Coach	1929	1926, 1929–1937, 1943	Nebraska
W. Harold Browne	Assistant coach	1930	1930–1940	
"Dutch" Koster	Assistant Freshman Coach	1932	1932	
"Red" Young	Assistant Freshman Coach	1932	1932	

== Game summaries ==
=== Iowa State ===
Iowa State at Nebraska

Team	1	2	3	4	Total
Iowa State	0	0	0	6	6
• Nebraska	6	6	0	0	12

- Date: October 8
- Location: Memorial Stadium, Lincoln • Lincoln, Nebraska
- Game attendance: 9,222

1932 opened with a choppy performance, where the game was won through individual performances, and not lost despite the lack of effective teamwork. Iowa State figured out how to deal with the Nebraska line by the end of the third quarter, but could not score a second touchdown to draw even before time expired. The Cyclones fell to 4–22–1 against the Cornhuskers all-time.

=== Minnesota ===
Nebraska at Minnesota

Team	1	2	3	4	Total
Nebraska	6	0	0	0	6
• Minnesota	0	7	0	0	7

- Date: October 15
- Location: Memorial Stadium • Minneapolis
- Game attendance: 18,000
- Game weather: Windy

Reviving an old and storied series with the powerhouse Minnesota team, a battle last fought in 1913, the Cornhuskers struck first and early, using the wind to their advantage in the passing game. The wind subsequently turned against Nebraska when the point after went wide. In the second quarter, the Golden Gophers powered in their own score, and their point after was good. That one point ultimately decided the game, as both teams managed to fight each other to a defensive, scoreless tie in the second half. According to the university's yearbook, some media representatives considered Nebraska the winner of the game, if not the scoreboard. Officially, however, the result placed another "L" in the record against Nebraska, which moved the Cornhuskers to 2–11–2 against the Golden Gophers since the series began in 1900, farther away from their hopes of some day catching up with Minnesota.

=== Kansas ===
Nebraska at Kansas

Team	1	2	Total
• Nebraska			20
Kansas			6

- Date: October 22
- Location: Memorial Stadium • Lawrence, Kansas

Any hangover from the Minnesota loss was quickly shaken off when the Cornhuskers made their second straight road game appearance and once again defeated Kansas with relative ease. The game was never seriously in doubt, and the Jayhawks suffered yet another loss in a long line of disappointments dating back to 1917. The Jayhawks were set farther back, to 9–28–2 against the Cornhuskers.

=== Kansas State ===
Kansas State at Nebraska

Team	1	2	3	4	Total
Kansas State	0	0	0	0	0
• Nebraska	0	0	0	6	6

- Date: October 29
- Location: Memorial Stadium, Lincoln • Lincoln, Nebraska

The Kansas State squad fought stubbornly and kept Nebraska's homecoming game in doubt until the very end. A mostly defensive event, Nebraska did not manage to get the game-winning score until less than three minutes remained on the clock to save the day and move up to 15–1–1 against the Wildcats since 1911.

=== Iowa ===
Nebraska at Iowa

Team	1	2	Total
• Nebraska			14
Iowa			13

- Date: November 5
- Location: Iowa Stadium • Iowa City, Iowa

Nebraska scratched a lead from the field by putting the Hawkeyes behind 0–14, a score that held through the start of the fourth quarter, but Iowa did not roll over and give up. A couple of quick touchdowns late in the game put a scare into the Cornhuskers, but defeat was averted when an Iowa point after went wide, allowing Nebraska to escape Ames with a win, and improving them to 14–7–3 against the Hawkeyes.

=== Pittsburgh ===
Pittsburgh at Nebraska

Team	1	2	3	4	Total
Pittsburgh	0	0	0	0	0
Nebraska	0	0	0	0	0

- Date: November 12
- Location: Memorial Stadium, Lincoln • Lincoln, Nebraska

Nebraska, failing to win against Pittsburgh since 1921, which was their only win to date in six tries, fought the favored powerhouse Panthers to a scoreless tie in Lincoln, notching a moral victory if not a scoreboard win. Pittsburgh managed only eight first downs on the day to Nebraska's thirteen, and the Cornhusker defense nabbed three very timely turnovers to keep the Panthers out of the end zone, handing both teams the third tie in their shared series.

=== Oklahoma ===
Nebraska at Oklahoma

Team	1	2	3	4	Total
• Nebraska	0	0	3	2	5
Oklahoma	0	0	0	0	0

- Date: November 19
- Location: Oklahoma Memorial Stadium • Norman, Oklahoma

Oklahoma fought Nebraska at every turn and held on to a scoreless first half, but finally cracked in the third quarter when the Sooners allowed a Cornhusker field goal to break the drought. Oklahoma was still fighting to take the game back when the Sooner QB was tackled in his own end zone to hand Nebraska two more points to end the scoring. The win clinched the league title for Nebraska and moved the Cornhuskers ahead on the series to 8–2–2.

=== Missouri ===
Missouri at Nebraska

Team	1	2	3	4	Total
Missouri	0	6	0	0	6
• Nebraska	7	0	0	14	21

- Date: November 24
- Location: Memorial Stadium, Lincoln • Lincoln, Nebraska

Missouri's futility in regaining possession of the Missouri-Nebraska Bell was extended yet again as Nebraska closed out the conference season unbeaten. The Tigers attempted to make a game of it, trailing by only a point at the halftime break, and successfully holding back Nebraska through the third quarter before finally breaking under the pressure and allowing the Cornhuskers to run off 14 points and pull away. Missouri's disappointment was made all the worse as they fell farther back in their record against Nebraska, to 6–17–3.

=== SMU ===
Nebraska at SMU

Team	1	2	Total
• Nebraska			21
SMU			14

- Date: December 3
- Location: Ownby Stadium • Dallas

After a year off since the first meeting of these squads, a scoreless tie, Nebraska and SMU squared off to settle affairs. The Mustangs became the only team on Nebraska's 1932 slate to manage a running touchdown through the Cornhusker line, but SMU miscues and lost fumbles in the first half gave Nebraska all the points they would need to secure the victory. The Mustangs and Cornhuskers never met on the field again, leaving the abbreviated series owned by the Cornhuskers 1–0–1.

== After the season ==
Nebraska's domination of the Big 6 continued, as the Cornhuskers now owned four of the five Big 6 championships since the league's reformation. Coach Bible's teams were well-established as a force to be feared nationwide, and his Nebraska career record improved to 23–7–6 (.722). The Nebraska program enjoyed yet another improvement in the overall record, moving to 243–81–26 (.731), while the conference record was now up to a dominating 69–10–8 (.839).
