= 1932 Drake Bulldogs football team =

American college football season

1932 Drake Bulldogs football
- Conference: Missouri Valley Conference
- Record: 2–6–1 (1–3–1 MVC)
- Head coach: Evan O. Williams (1st season)
- Home stadium: Drake Stadium

1932 Missouri Valley Conference football standings
	Conf.					Overall
Team	W		L		T	W		L		T
Oklahoma A&M $	3	–	0	–	0	9	–	1	–	2
Creighton	3	–	1	–	0	5	–	2	–	1
Butler	0	–	0	–	1	2	–	4	–	1
Washington University	1	–	2	–	0	4	–	4	–	0
Drake	1	–	3	–	1	2	–	6	–	1
Grinnell	1	–	3	–	0	3	–	4	–	1
$ – Conference champion

The 1932 Drake Bulldogs football team was an American football team that represented Drake University in the Missouri Valley Conference (MVC) during the 1932 college football season. In its first and only season under head coach Evan O. Williams, the team compiled a 2–6–1 record (1–3–1 against MVC opponents), finished in fifth place in the conference, and was outscored by a total of 196 to 57.

== Schedule ==
Date	Opponent	Site	Result	Attendance	Source
September 30	Simpson*	Drake Stadium; Des Moines, IA	W 31–9		
October 7	Oklahoma A&M	Drake Stadium; Des Moines, IA	L 7–27		
October 15	at Notre Dame*	Notre Dame Stadium; Notre Dame, IN	L 0–62	6,663	
October 22	at Creighton	Creighton Stadium; Omaha, NE	L 0–12		
October 28	Grinnell^{†}	Drake Stadium; Des Moines, IA	L 0–7		
November 5	at Butler	Fairview Stadium; Indianapolis, IN (rivalry)	T 0–0		
November 12	Washington University	Drake Stadium; Des Moines, IA	W 6–0		
November 19	at Iowa State*	State Field; Ames, IA	L 13–34	3,000	
November 26	at Marquette*	Marquette Stadium; Milwaukee, WI	L 0–45		
*Non-conference game; ^{†}Homecoming
