= Norm Greeney =

American football player (1910–1985)

No. 20, 30, 24
- Position: Guard

Personal information
- Born: May 7, 1910; Cleveland, Ohio, U.S.
- Died: October 20, 1985 (aged 75); Kelleys Island, Ohio, U.S.
- Listed height: 5 ft 11 in (1.80 m)
- Listed weight: 212 lb (96 kg)

Career information
- High school: John Marshall (Cleveland, Ohio)
- College: Notre Dame (1929–1932)

Career history
- Green Bay Packers (1933); Pittsburgh Pirates (1934–1935)

Career statistics
- Games played: 18
- Games started: 7

Norman Joseph Greeney (May 7, 1910 – October 20, 1985) was an American professional football player. A guard, he played college football for the Notre Dame Fighting Irish and was a member of their national championship team in 1930. After college, he spent three seasons in the National Football League (NFL) with the Green Bay Packers and Pittsburgh Pirates.

== Early life ==
Greeney was born on May 7, 1910, in Cleveland, Ohio. He attended John Marshall High School where he was a standout football player and wrestler and also competed in basketball and baseball. A lineman in football, he was named All-Cleveland, and in wrestling, he competed as a light heavyweight and was considered among the best Ohio high school wrestlers. He graduated from John Marshall in 1929 and then enrolled at Notre Dame University in Indiana later that year.

== College career ==
Greeney played for the freshman football team at Notre Dame in 1929, impressing coach Knute Rockne with his play. He made the varsity team in 1930 as a backup to Tom Kassis at left guard. That year, he made his debut coming in for an injured Kassis against the Northwestern Wildcats, then played nearly the full game the following week against USC. He helped Notre Dame win the 1930 national championship. Greeney then competed with Jim Harris for a starting role in 1931 before suffering an injury.

Greeney became a right guard at the start of the 1932 season, his senior year, and won the starting job. The Dayton Herald described him as a "good blocker and a wonder at opening holes in the opposing forward wall". Entering his senior year, he was assigned Notre Dame's football locker 133, which was given to players considered to be likely All-America selections. In addition to his football talents, Greeney was considered one of the top wrestlers at Notre Dame.

== Professional career ==
In April 1933, Greeney signed with the Green Bay Packers of the NFL. The Packers signed him on the suggestion of Notre Dame coach Hunk Anderson, who described him as "a very good blocker ... about as tough as they come [and] the ideal type for the pro league". He made the team and appeared in seven games, four as a starter, before being released by the Packers in November 1933. The 1933 Packers finished the season with a record of 5–7–1. Greeney signed with the Pittsburgh Pirates in 1934 and was used as a backup lineman, appearing in 10 games while starting three. The 1934 Pirates compiled a record of 2–10. He initially returned in 1935 but was released in mid-September, after having appeared in just one game. Greeney concluded his NFL career with 18 games played, seven as a starter.

== Later life ==
After his playing career ended, he coached the Newsboy Union Skippies football team. He later worked for the Cleveland Trencher Company. He married LaVerne Eiben in 1933 and had two daughters with her. He died on October 20, 1985, in Kelleys Island, Ohio, at the age of 75.
