= 1932 Toledo Rockets football team =

American college football season

1932 Toledo Rockets football
- Conference: Ohio Athletic Conference
- Record: 3–4 (3–1 OAC)
- Head coach: Jim Nicholson (2nd season)
- Captain: Babe Hissong
- Home stadium: St. John Field

1932 Ohio Athletic Conference football standings
	Conf.					Overall
Team	W		L		T	W		L		T
Case $	6	–	0	–	0	7	–	2	–	0
Heidelberg	6	–	1	–	0	6	–	1	–	1
Baldwin–Wallace	5	–	1	–	1	6	–	1	–	1
Ohio Northern	3	–	1	–	0	4	–	2	–	1
Toledo	3	–	1	–	0	3	–	4	–	0
Wooster	4	–	1	–	2	5	–	1	–	2
Muskingum	3	–	1	–	1	4	–	3	–	1
Otterbein	4	–	2	–	2	4	–	2	–	2
Marietta	3	–	2	–	1	3	–	2	–	2
John Carroll	3	–	2	–	1	5	–	4	–	1
Dayton	1	–	1	–	0	9	–	2	–	0
Kenyon	2	–	2	–	0	2	–	3	–	1
Akron	1	–	4	–	3	2	–	4	–	3
Capital	1	–	4	–	2	1	–	4	–	2
Oberlin	1	–	3	–	0	2	–	6	–	0
Ashland	1	–	5	–	1	2	–	5	–	1
Hiram	1	–	6	–	0	1	–	6	–	1
Kent State	0	–	5	–	2	0	–	5	–	2
Mount Union	1	–	6	–	0	1	–	8	–	0
Xavier	0	–	1	–	0	3	–	4	–	1
$ – Conference champion

The 1932 Toledo Rockets football team was an American football team that represented Toledo University in the Ohio Athletic Conference (OAC) during the 1932 college football season. In their second season under head coach Jim Nicholson, the Rockets compiled a 3–4 record (3–1 against OAC opponents). Babe Hissong was the team captain. The team played its home games at St. John Field in Toledo, Ohio.

== Schedule ==
Date	Opponent	Site	Result	Source
October 1	Capital	St. John Field; Toledo, OH	W 18–0	
October 8	Detroit City College*	St. John Field; Toledo, OH	L 0–3	
October 15	at Heidelberg	Tiffin, OH	L 0–12	
October 22	Marietta	St. John Field; Toledo, OH	W 6–0	
October 28	Ohio State "B" team*	St. John Field; Toledo, OH	L 0–6	
November 5	at Bowling Green*	Bowling Green, OH (rivalry)	L 6–12	
November 12	Otterbein	St. John Field; Toledo, OH	W 12–7	
*Non-conference game
