= 1932 Bowling Green Falcons football team =

American college football season

1932 Bowling Green Falcons football
- Conference: Independent
- Record: 3–3–1
- Head coach: Warren Steller (9th season)
- Captain: Willard Schaller

1932 Midwestern college football independents records
	Conf.			Overall
Team	W	L	T	W		L		T
Western State Teachers		–		6	–	0	–	1
Michigan State		–		7	–	1	–	0
Western Reserve		–		7	–	1	–	0
Detroit		–		8	–	2	–	0
Michigan Tech		–		4	–	1	–	0
No. 7 Notre Dame		–		7	–	2	–	0
DePaul		–		5	–	1	–	2
Michigan State Normal		–		5	–	2	–	0
Saint Louis		–		5	–	2	–	0
Marquette		–		4	–	3	–	1
Bowling Green		–		3	–	3	–	1
Central State (MI)		–		3	–	4	–	1
Haskell		–		2	–	5	–	1
Detroit City		–		1	–	6	–	0

The 1932 Bowling Green Falcons football team was an American football team that represented Bowling Green State College (later renamed Bowling Green State University) as an independent during the 1932 college football season. In its ninth season under head coach Warren Steller, the team compiled a 3–3–1 record and was outscored by a total of 77 to 33. Willard Schaller was the team captain.

== Schedule ==
Date	Opponent	Site	Result	Source
September 24	Baldwin–Wallace	Bowling Green, OH	L 0–24	
October 1	at Mount Union	Alliance, OH	W 7–6	
October 14	at Bluffton	Bluffton, OH	L 0–14	
October 22	Defiance	Bowling Green, OH	W 14–7	
October 29	at Hiram	Hiram, OH	T 0–0	
November 5	Toledo	Bowling Green, OH (rivalry)	W 12–6	
November 12	Ohio Northern	Bowling Green, OH	L 0–20	
