= 1932 Xavier Musketeers football team =

American college football season

1932 Xavier Musketeers football
- Conference: Ohio Athletic Conference
- Record: 3–4–1 (0–1 OAC)
- Head coach: Joseph A. Meyer (13th season)
- Home stadium: Corcoran Field

1932 Ohio Athletic Conference football standings
| | Conf. | | | | | Overall |
| Team | W | | L | | T | W | | L | | T |
|---|---|---|---|---|---|---|---|---|---|---|
| Case $ | 6 | – | 0 | – | 0 | 7 | – | 2 | – | 0 |
| Heidelberg | 6 | – | 1 | – | 0 | 6 | – | 1 | – | 1 |
| Baldwin–Wallace | 5 | – | 1 | – | 1 | 6 | – | 1 | – | 1 |
| Ohio Northern | 3 | – | 1 | – | 0 | 4 | – | 2 | – | 1 |
| Toledo | 3 | – | 1 | – | 0 | 3 | – | 4 | – | 0 |
| Wooster | 4 | – | 1 | – | 2 | 5 | – | 1 | – | 2 |
| Muskingum | 3 | – | 1 | – | 1 | 4 | – | 3 | – | 1 |
| Otterbein | 4 | – | 2 | – | 2 | 4 | – | 2 | – | 2 |
| Marietta | 3 | – | 2 | – | 1 | 3 | – | 2 | – | 2 |
| John Carroll | 3 | – | 2 | – | 1 | 5 | – | 4 | – | 1 |
| Dayton | 1 | – | 1 | – | 0 | 9 | – | 2 | – | 0 |
| Kenyon | 2 | – | 2 | – | 0 | 2 | – | 3 | – | 1 |
| Akron | 1 | – | 4 | – | 3 | 2 | – | 4 | – | 3 |
| Capital | 1 | – | 4 | – | 2 | 1 | – | 4 | – | 2 |
| Oberlin | 1 | – | 3 | – | 0 | 2 | – | 6 | – | 0 |
| Ashland | 1 | – | 5 | – | 1 | 2 | – | 5 | – | 1 |
| Hiram | 1 | – | 6 | – | 0 | 1 | – | 6 | – | 1 |
| Kent State | 0 | – | 5 | – | 2 | 0 | – | 5 | – | 2 |
| Mount Union | 1 | – | 6 | – | 0 | 1 | – | 8 | – | 0 |
| Xavier | 0 | – | 1 | – | 0 | 3 | – | 4 | – | 1 |
$ – Conference champion

The 1932 Xavier Musketeers football team was an American football team that represented Xavier University as a member of the Ohio Athletic Conference (OAC) during the 1932 college football season. In their 13th year under head coach Joseph A. Meyer, the Musketeers compiled a 3–4–1 record.

== Schedule ==
| Date | Time | Opponent | Site | Result | Attendance | Source |
|---|---|---|---|---|---|---|
| September 23 | | Transylvania* | Corcoran Field; Cincinnati, OH | W 46–0 | 10,000 | |
| September 30 | 8:15 p.m. | Centre* | Corcoran Field; Cincinnati, OH | W 7–0 | 7,773 | |
| October 7 | | Oglethorpe* | Corcoran Field; Cincinnati, OH | L 0–7 | 5,300 | |
| October 14 | | Dayton | Corcoran Field; Cincinnati, OH | L 0–7 | | |
| October 21 | | Washington & Jefferson* | Corcoran Field; Cincinnati, OH | L 0–34 | 9,000 | |
| October 28 | | Loyola (LA)* | Corcoran Field; Cincinnati, OH | T 6–6 | | |
| November 12 | | Carnegie Tech* | Corcoran Field; Cincinnati, OH | L 0–15 | 4,500 | |
| November 24 | | Haskell* | Corcoran Field; Cincinnati, OH | W 20–7 | 12,000 | |
*Non-conference game; All times are in Eastern time
