= 1932 Washington University Bears football team =

American college football season

1932 Washington University Bears football
- Conference: Missouri Valley Conference
- Record: 4–4 (1–2 MVC)
- Head coach: Jimmy Conzelman (1st season)
- Home stadium: Francis Field

1932 Missouri Valley Conference football standings
| | Conf. | | | | | Overall |
| Team | W | | L | | T | W | | L | | T |
|---|---|---|---|---|---|---|---|---|---|---|
| Oklahoma A&M $ | 3 | – | 0 | – | 0 | 9 | – | 1 | – | 2 |
| Creighton | 3 | – | 1 | – | 0 | 5 | – | 2 | – | 1 |
| Butler | 0 | – | 0 | – | 1 | 2 | – | 4 | – | 1 |
| Washington University | 1 | – | 2 | – | 0 | 4 | – | 4 | – | 0 |
| Drake | 1 | – | 3 | – | 1 | 2 | – | 6 | – | 1 |
| Grinnell | 1 | – | 3 | – | 0 | 3 | – | 4 | – | 1 |
$ – Conference champion

The 1932 Washington University Bears football team represented Washington University in St. Louis as a member of the Missouri Valley Conference (MVC) during the 1932 college football season. In its first season under head coach Jimmy Conzelman, the team compiled a 4–4 record (1–2 against conference opponents), finished fourth in the MVC, and was outscored by a total of 92 to 80. The team played its home games at Francis Field in St. Louis.

== Schedule ==
| Date | Opponent | Site | Result | Attendance | Source |
|---|---|---|---|---|---|
| October 1 | Illinois College* | Francis Field; St. Louis, MO | W 6–0 | 3,500 | |
| October 8 | Drury* | Francis Field; St. Louis, MO | W 39–7 | 4,000 | |
| October 15 | McKendree* | Francis Field; St. Louis, MO | L 6–13 | 3,500 | |
| October 22 | Grinnell^{†} | Francis Field; St. Louis, MO | W 14–7 | 3,500 | |
| October 29 | at Missouri* | Memorial Stadium; Columbia, MO | W 14–6 | | |
| November 5 | at Creighton | Creighton Stadium; Omaha, NE | L 0–40 | | |
| November 12 | at Drake | Drake Stadium; Des Moines, IA | L 0–6 | | |
| November 26 | at Saint Louis* | Walsh Stadium; St. Louis, MO | L 6–19 | 17,500 | |
*Non-conference game; ^{†}Homecoming
