= 1932 Missouri Tigers football team =

American college football season

1932 Missouri Tigers football
- Conference: Big Six Conference
- Record: 1–7–1 (1–3–1 Big 6)
- Head coach: Frank Carideo (1st season)
- Home stadium: Memorial Stadium

1932 Big Six Conference football standings
	Conf.					Overall
Team	W		L		T	W		L		T
Nebraska $	5	–	0	–	0	7	–	1	–	1
Kansas	3	–	2	–	0	5	–	3	–	0
Oklahoma	3	–	2	–	0	4	–	4	–	1
Kansas State	2	–	3	–	0	4	–	4	–	0
Missouri	1	–	3	–	1	1	–	7	–	1
Iowa State	0	–	4	–	1	3	–	4	–	1
$ – Conference champion

The 1932 Missouri Tigers football team was an American football team that represented the University of Missouri in the Big Six Conference (Big 6) during the 1932 college football season. The team compiled a 1–7–1 record (1–3–1 against Big 6 opponents), finished in fifth place in the Big 6, and was outscored by all opponents by a combined total of 184 to 32. Frank Carideo was the head coach for the first of three seasons. The team played its home games at Memorial Stadium in Columbia, Missouri.

The team's leading scorer was Charles Schiele with 12 points.

== Schedule ==
Date	Opponent	Site	Result	Attendance	Source
October 1	at Northwestern*	Dyche Stadium; Evanston, IL	L 0–27		
October 8	Texas*	Memorial Stadium; Columbia, MO	L 0–65		
October 15	at Kansas State*	Memorial Stadium; Manhattan, KS	L 0–25		
October 22	Iowa State	Memorial Stadium; Columbia, MO (rivalry)	T 0–0	6,000	
October 29	Washington University	Memorial Stadium; Columbia, MO	L 6–14		
November 5	at Oklahoma	Memorial Stadium; Norman, OK (rivalry)	W 14–6		
November 12	Kansas	Memorial Stadium; Columbia, MO (rivalry)	L 0–7		
November 24	at Nebraska	Memorial Stadium; Lincoln, NE (rivalry)	L 6–21	14,034	
December 3	at Saint Louis*	Walsh Stadium; St. Louis, MO	L 6–19	9,000	
*Non-conference game
