= 1932 Case Scientists football team =

American college football season

1932 Case Scientists football

OAC champion
- Conference: Ohio Athletic Conference
- Record: 7–2 (6–0 OAC)
- Head coach: Ray A. Ride (3rd season)
- Home stadium: Van Horn Field

1932 Ohio Athletic Conference football standings
	Conf.					Overall
Team	W		L		T	W		L		T
Case $	6	–	0	–	0	7	–	2	–	0
Heidelberg	6	–	1	–	0	6	–	1	–	1
Baldwin–Wallace	5	–	1	–	1	6	–	1	–	1
Ohio Northern	3	–	1	–	0	4	–	2	–	1
Toledo	3	–	1	–	0	3	–	4	–	0
Wooster	4	–	1	–	2	5	–	1	–	2
Muskingum	3	–	1	–	1	4	–	3	–	1
Otterbein	4	–	2	–	2	4	–	2	–	2
Marietta	3	–	2	–	1	3	–	2	–	2
John Carroll	3	–	2	–	1	5	–	4	–	1
Dayton	1	–	1	–	0	9	–	2	–	0
Kenyon	2	–	2	–	0	2	–	3	–	1
Akron	1	–	4	–	3	2	–	4	–	3
Capital	1	–	4	–	2	1	–	4	–	2
Oberlin	1	–	3	–	0	2	–	6	–	0
Ashland	1	–	5	–	1	2	–	5	–	1
Hiram	1	–	6	–	0	1	–	6	–	1
Kent State	0	–	5	–	2	0	–	5	–	2
Mount Union	1	–	6	–	0	1	–	8	–	0
Xavier	0	–	1	–	0	3	–	4	–	1
$ – Conference champion

The 1932 Case football team represented the Case School of Applied Science, now a part of Case Western Reserve University, during the 1932 college football season. The team's head coach was Ray A. Ride.

== Schedule ==
Date	Time	Opponent	Site	Result
September 24		Hiram	Van Horn Field; Cleveland, OH	W 32–0
October 1		at Colgate*	Hamilton, NY	L 0–27
October 8		Akron	Van Horn Field; Cleveland, OH	W 19–0
October 15		at John Carroll	Cleveland Municipal Stadium; Cleveland, OH	W 14–7
October 22		at Wooster	Wooster, OH	W 13–0
October 29		Baldwin–Wallace	Van Horn Field; Cleveland, OH	W 13–6
November 5		at Western Reserve*	League Park; Cleveland, OH	L 7–13
November 12	2:15 p.m.	Hillsdale*	Van Horn Field; Cleveland, OH	W 20–8
November 19		at Oberlin	Oberlin, OH	W 14–0
*Non-conference game
