= Ohio State Buckeyes baseball =

Baseball team of Ohio State University

Ohio State Buckeyes baseball team
- 2026 Ohio State Buckeyes baseball team
- Founded: 1881
- University: Ohio State University
- Athletic director: Ross Bjork
- Head coach: Justin Haire (2nd season)
- Conference: Big Ten
- Location: Columbus, Ohio
- Home stadium: Nick Swisher Field at Bill Davis Stadium (capacity: 5,500)
- Nickname: Buckeyes
- Colors: Scarlet and gray

College World Series champions
- 1966

College World Series runner-up
- 1965

College World Series appearances
- 1951, 1965, 1966, 1967

NCAA regional champions
- 1999, 2003

NCAA tournament appearances
- 1951, 1955, 1965, 1966, 1967, 1982, 1991, 1992, 1993, 1994, 1995, 1997, 1999, 2001, 2002, 2003, 2005, 2007, 2009, 2016, 2018, 2019

Conference tournament champions
- 1991, 1994, 1995, 1997, 2002, 2003, 2005, 2007, 2016, 2019

Conference regular season champions
- 1917, 1924, 1943, 1951, 1955, 1965, 1966, 1967, 1991, 1993, 1994, 1995, 1999, 2001, 2009

The Ohio State Buckeyes baseball team is the college baseball team of Ohio State University. The program, founded in 1881, was the first athletic team in Ohio State history. Bill Davis Stadium in Columbus, Ohio, has been the home field of the program since 1997. The team won a National Title in 1966, and also 14 Big Ten Titles throughout the team's history. Ohio State has produced many professional baseball players, such as major leaguers Steve Arlin, Frank Howard, Nick Swisher, Barry Bonnell, Dave Burba, and Fred Taylor.

== History ==
Ohio State played its first season in 1881, as the first-ever organized sport at OSU. Ohio State was undefeated, only playing one game and winning against Capital 8–5. From there baseball in Columbus took off as OSU won the Ohio title several more times.

== Stadium ==
Ohio State currently plays at Bill Davis Stadium. From 1967 to 1997 the Buckeyes played at Trautman Field. In 2011, the playing field was named after former Buckeye and Major League Baseball All-Star and World Series Champion Nick Swisher, thus the official name of the Buckeye's home is Nick Swisher Field at Bill Davis Stadium.

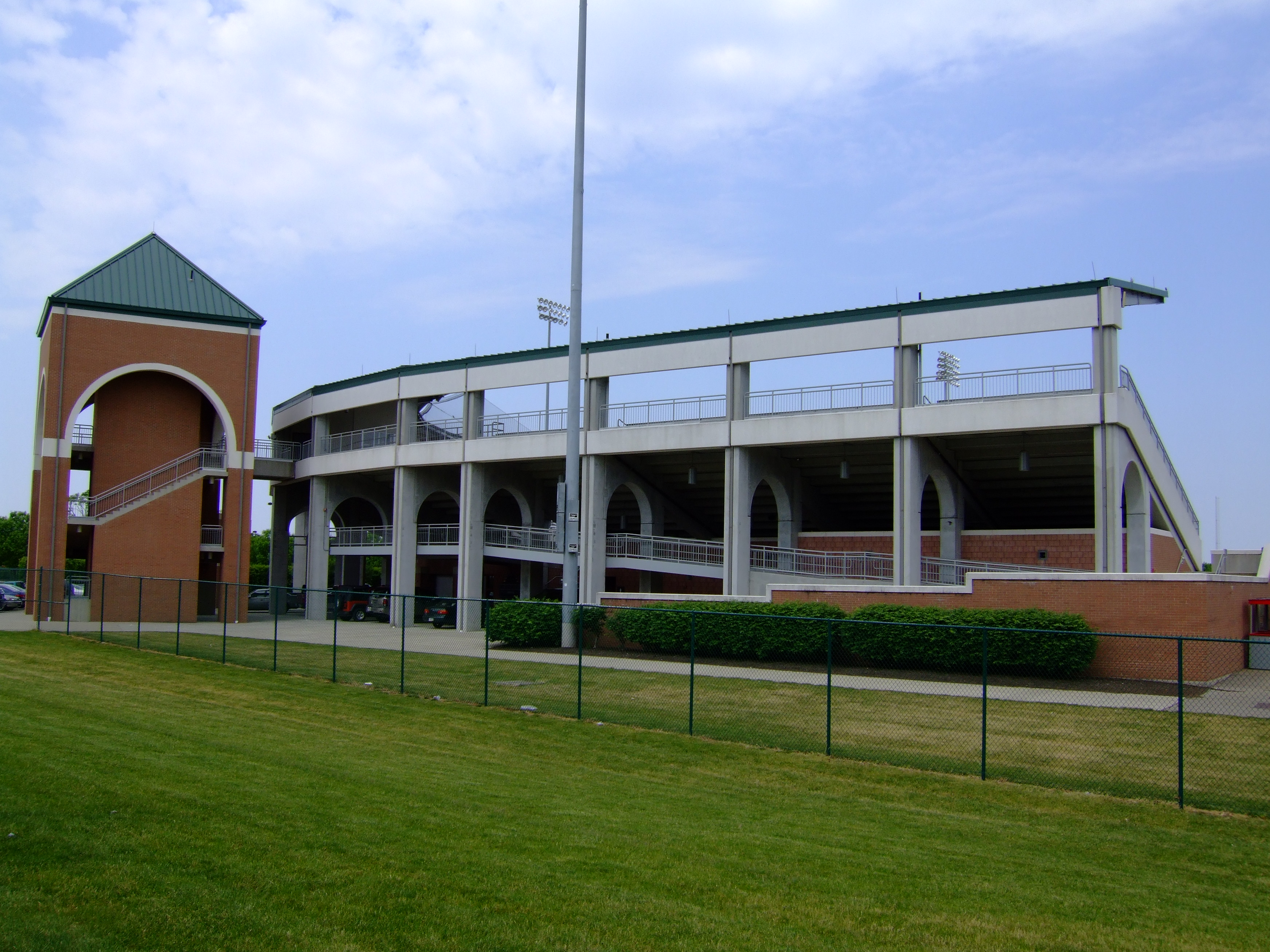
Bill Davis Stadium on the campus of Ohio State University

== Season-by-season results ==
Season	Coach	Overall	Conference	Standing	Postseason	Coaches' poll	CB poll
No Coach (Independent) (–present)

== Head coaches ==
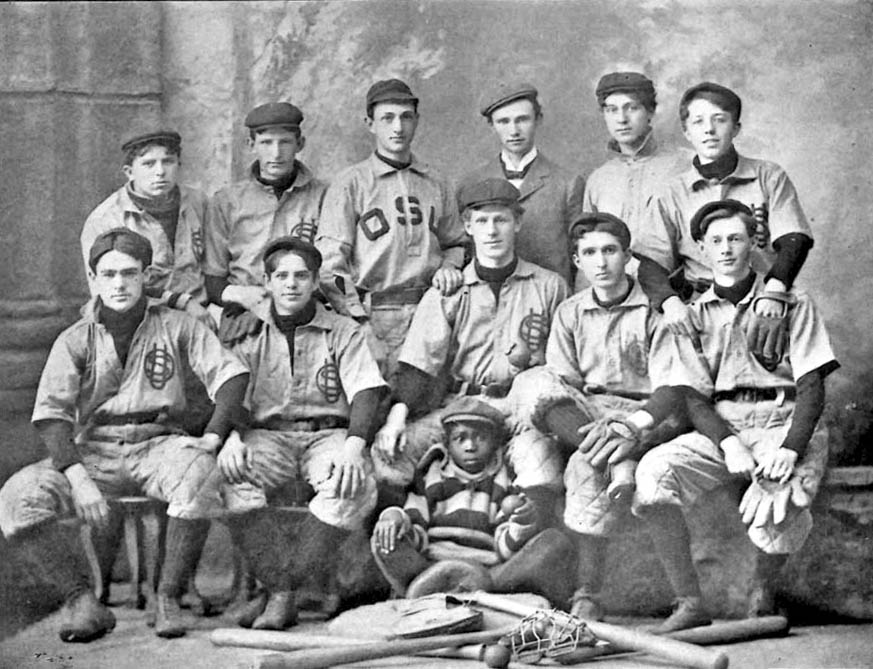
Ohio State baseball team of 1897

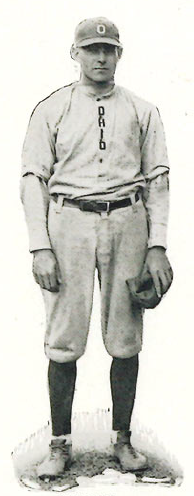
Pitcher Russ Miller in the 1924 Makio yearbook

Years	Coach	W–L–T	Pct.
1881–1886; 1888–1900; 1904–1907; 1909; 1911–1912	Unknown	159–79–6	.664
1901–1902	Jack Reed	15–11–0	.577
1903	C.W. Dickerson	9–5–1	.633
1913–1928	Lynn W. St. John	191–100–7	.653
1929–1932	Wayne Wright	37–26–1	.586
1933–38; 1947–1950	Floyd Stahl	129–108–1	.544
1939–1944	Fred Mackey	80–60–0	.571
1945–1946	Lowell Wrigley	18–26–1	.411
1951–1975	Marty Karow	479–341–14	.583
1976–1987	Dick Finn	310–262–5	.542
1988–2010	Bob Todd	801–409–2	.662
2011–2022	Greg Beals	345–288–1	.545
2023–2024	Bill Mosiello	60–51	.541
2025–present	Justin Haire	43–62	.410

== Ohio State in the NCAA tournament ==
- The NCAA Division I baseball tournament started in 1947.
- The format of the tournament has changed through the years.

Year	Record	Pct	Notes
1951	0–2	.000	7th place at the 1951 College World Series
1955	1–2	.333	
1965	7–2	.777	2nd place at the 1965 College World Series
1966	8–1	.888	1st place at the 1966 College World Series
1967	3–3	.500	7th place at the 1967 College World Series
1982	0–2	.000	
1991	2–2	.500	
1992	2–2	.500	
1993	3–2	.600	
1994	1–2	.333	
1995	0–2	.000	
1997	0–2	.000	
1999	4–2	.666	
2001	0–2	.000	
2002	2–2	.500	
2003	3–2	.600	
2005	1–2	.333	
2007	1–2	.333	
2009	2–2	.500	
2016	1–2	.333	
2018	0–2	.000	
2019	1–2	.333	
Totals	42–44	.488	

- Note: In 1951, Ohio State participated in the district playoffs, which it won, and moved on to the College World Series. Prior to 1954, district playoff games were not considered a part of the National Collegiate Baseball Championship, and thus are not counted in Ohio State's NCAA tournament record.

== All-Americans ==
- Ronnie Bourquin (2006)
- Scott Lewis (2003)
- Justin Fry (1999)
- EJ Laratta (1999)
- Matt Beaumont (1994)
- Ray Shoup (1967)
- Steve Arlin (1965, 1966)
- Tom Perdue (1966)
- Paul Ebert (1954)
- Stewart Hein (1951)
- Fred Taylor (1950)
- Terry Greer (1977) catcher
- Arnie Chonko (1965)

== Retired numbers ==
Ohio State Buckeyes retired numbers
No.	Player	Pos.	Tenure	No. ret.	Ref.
13	Marty Karow	1B	1925–1927	2008	
18	Bob Todd	Coach (Note: Although Todd did not have a career as player at Ohio State, he coached the team wearing a jersey with #18.)	1988–2010	2010	
22	Steve Arlin	P	1965– 1966	2003	
27	Fred Taylor	1B	1947–1950	2003	

== See also ==
- List of NCAA Division I baseball programs
