= 1932 Kansas State Wildcats football team =

American college football season

1932 Kansas State Wildcats football
- Conference: Big Six Conference
- Record: 4–4 (2–3 Big 6)
- Head coach: Bo McMillin (5th season)
- Home stadium: Memorial Stadium

1932 Big Six Conference football standings
	Conf.					Overall
Team	W		L		T	W		L		T
Nebraska $	5	–	0	–	0	7	–	1	–	1
Kansas	3	–	2	–	0	5	–	3	–	0
Oklahoma	3	–	2	–	0	4	–	4	–	1
Kansas State	2	–	3	–	0	4	–	4	–	0
Missouri	1	–	3	–	1	1	–	7	–	1
Iowa State	0	–	4	–	1	3	–	4	–	1
$ – Conference champion

The 1932 Kansas State Wildcats football team represented Kansas State University in the 1932 college football season. The 1932 team finished 4–4 overall and they finished in fourth place in the Big Six Conference with a 2–3 conference record. The Kansas State team was led by future Hall-of-Fame coach Bo McMillin in his fifth season. The Wildcats played their home games in Memorial Stadium. The Wildcats scored 160 points and gave up 80 points.

== Schedule ==
Date	Opponent	Site	Result	Attendance	Source
September 24	Wichita*	Memorial Stadium; Manhattan, KS	W 26–0		
October 1	at Purdue*	Ross–Ade Stadium; West Lafayette, IN	L 13–29	10,000	
October 7	at Kansas Wesleyan*	Salina, KS	W 52–6		
October 15	Missouri	Memorial Stadium; Manhattan, KS	W 25–0	7,000	
October 22	at Oklahoma	Oklahoma Memorial Stadium; Norman, OK	L 13–20		
October 29	at Nebraska	Memorial Stadium; Lincoln, NE (rivalry)	L 0–6	15,193	
November 5	Iowa State	Memorial Stadium; Manhattan, KS (rivalry)	W 31–0	6,500	
November 19	Kansas^{†}	Memorial Stadium; Manhattan, KS (rivalry)	L 0–19	10,000	
*Non-conference game; ^{†}Homecoming
