= 1932 Akron Zippers football team =

American college football season

1932 Akron Zippers football
- Conference: Ohio Athletic Conference
- Record: 2–4–3 (1–4–3 OAC)
- Head coach: Red Blair (6th season)
- Home stadium: Buchtel Field

1932 Ohio Athletic Conference football standings
	Conf.					Overall
Team	W		L		T	W		L		T
Case $	6	–	0	–	0	7	–	2	–	0
Heidelberg	6	–	1	–	0	6	–	1	–	1
Baldwin–Wallace	5	–	1	–	1	6	–	1	–	1
Ohio Northern	3	–	1	–	0	4	–	2	–	1
Toledo	3	–	1	–	0	3	–	4	–	0
Wooster	4	–	1	–	2	5	–	1	–	2
Muskingum	3	–	1	–	1	4	–	3	–	1
Otterbein	4	–	2	–	2	4	–	2	–	2
Marietta	3	–	2	–	1	3	–	2	–	2
John Carroll	3	–	2	–	1	5	–	4	–	1
Dayton	1	–	1	–	0	9	–	2	–	0
Kenyon	2	–	2	–	0	2	–	3	–	1
Akron	1	–	4	–	3	2	–	4	–	3
Capital	1	–	4	–	2	1	–	4	–	2
Oberlin	1	–	3	–	0	2	–	6	–	0
Ashland	1	–	5	–	1	2	–	5	–	1
Hiram	1	–	6	–	0	1	–	6	–	1
Kent State	0	–	5	–	2	0	–	5	–	2
Mount Union	1	–	6	–	0	1	–	8	–	0
Xavier	0	–	1	–	0	3	–	4	–	1
$ – Conference champion

The 1932 Akron Zippers football team was an American football team that represented the University of Akron in the Ohio Athletic Conference during the 1932 college football season. In its sixth season under head coach Red Blair, the team compiled a 2–4–3 record (1–4–3 in conference), including three scoreless ties, and was outscored by a total of 91 to 37.

== Schedule ==
Date	Opponent	Site	Result	Attendance	Source
	Ohio State reserves*	Buchtel Field; Akron, OH	W 7–0		
October 8	at Case	Cleveland, OH	L 0–19		
October 15	at Wooster	Wooster, OH	T 0–0		
October 22	Kent State	Buchtel Field; Akron, OH (rivalry)	T 0–0		
October 29	at Muskingum	New Concord, OH	L 4–14		
November 5	Baldwin–Wallace	Buchtel Field; Akron, OH	L 6–40		
November 12	Heidelberg	Buchtel Field; Akron, OH	L 0–12		
November 19	Otterbein	Buchtel Field; Akron, OH	T 0–0		
November 24	Mount Union	Buchtel Field; Akron, OH	W 20–6		
*Non-conference game
