= 1932 Butler Bulldogs football team =

American college football season

1932 Butler Bulldogs football
- Conference: Indiana Intercollegiate Conference, Missouri Valley Conference
- Record: 2–4–1 (2–1 IIC, 0–0–1 MVC)
- Head coach: Fred Mackey (1st season)
- Captain: Charles Sohl
- Home stadium: Butler Bowl

1932 Indiana Intercollegiate Conference football standings
	Conf.					Overall
Team	W		L		T	W		L		T
Manchester +	4	–	0	–	0	6	–	1	–	0
Valparaiso +	3	–	0	–	0	7	–	0	–	0
Wabash	4	–	0	–	2	4	–	2	–	2
DePauw	3	–	1	–	1	3	–	4	–	1
Butler	2	–	1	–	0	2	–	4	–	1
Franklin (IN)	4	–	2	–	1	4	–	3	–	1
Hanover	3	–	2	–	1	4	–	3	–	1
Rose Poly	3	–	3	–	0	5	–	3	–	0
Ball State	4	–	4	–	0	4	–	4	–	0
Evansville	2	–	2	–	1	2	–	4	–	1
Indiana State	3	–	4	–	0	3	–	5	–	0
Central Normal	1	–	6	–	0	1	–	7	–	0
Earlham	0	–	5	–	0	1	–	5	–	0
Oakland City	0	–	6	–	0	1	–	6	–	0
+ – Conference co-champions

1932 Missouri Valley Conference football standings
	Conf.					Overall
Team	W		L		T	W		L		T
Oklahoma A&M $	3	–	0	–	0	9	–	1	–	2
Creighton	3	–	1	–	0	5	–	2	–	1
Butler	0	–	0	–	1	2	–	4	–	1
Washington University	1	–	2	–	0	4	–	4	–	0
Drake	1	–	3	–	1	2	–	6	–	1
Grinnell	1	–	3	–	0	3	–	4	–	1
$ – Conference champion

The 1932 Butler Bulldogs football team represented Butler University as a member of the Indiana Intercollegiate Conference (IIC) and the Missouri Valley Conference (MVC) during the 1932 college football season. In its first season under head coach Fred Mackey, the team compiled a 2–4–1 record with a 2–1 against IIC opponents and an 0–0–1 record in MVC play.

== Schedule ==
Date	Opponent	Site	Result	Attendance	Source
September 23	Ball State	Butler Bowl; Indianapolis, IN	W 13–12		
October 8	at Cincinnati*	Carson Field; Cincinnati, OH	L 7–13	10,000	
October 15	Millikin*	Butler Bowl; Indianapolis, IN	L 7–13		
October 22	at Wabash	Crawfordsville, IN	L 0–34		
October 29	Franklin (IN)^{†}	Butler Bowl; Indianapolis, IN	W 14–0		
November 5	Drake	Butler Bowl; Indianapolis, IN	T 0–0		
November 12	Dayton*	Butler Bowl; Indianapolis, IN	L 0–7		
*Non-conference game; ^{†}Homecoming
