= 1932 Kansas Jayhawks football team =

American college football season

1932 Kansas Jayhawks football
- Conference: Big Six Conference
- Record: 5–3 (3–2 Big 6)
- Head coach: Bill Hargiss (5th season; first 2 games); Adrian Lindsey (1st season, final 6 games)
- Home stadium: Memorial Stadium

1932 Big Six Conference football standings
	Conf.					Overall
Team	W		L		T	W		L		T
Nebraska $	5	–	0	–	0	7	–	1	–	1
Kansas	3	–	2	–	0	5	–	3	–	0
Oklahoma	3	–	2	–	0	4	–	4	–	1
Kansas State	2	–	3	–	0	4	–	4	–	0
Missouri	1	–	3	–	1	1	–	7	–	1
Iowa State	0	–	4	–	1	3	–	4	–	1
$ – Conference champion

The 1932 Kansas Jayhawks football team represented the University of Kansas in the Big Six Conference during the 1932 college football season. The team began the season with Bill Hargiss as head coach, but Hargiss resigned on October 10, and Adrian Lindsey took over as head coach for the third game of the season against Iowa State. The 1932 Jayhawks compiled a 5–3 record (3–2 against conference opponents), tied for second place in the conference, and outscored opponents by a combined total of 89 to 77. They played their home games at Memorial Stadium in Lawrence, Kansas.

== Schedule ==
Date	Opponent	Site	Result	Attendance	Source
September 30	at Denver*	DU Stadium; Denver, CO	W 13–12		
October 8	Oklahoma	Memorial Stadium; Lawrence, KS	L 6–21		
October 15	at Iowa State	State Field; Ames, IA	W 26–0		
October 22	Nebraska^{†}	Memorial Stadium; Lawrence, KS (rivalry)	L 6–20	8,771	
October 28	at Saint Louis*	Walsh Stadium; St. Louis, MO	W 6–0		
November 5	Notre Dame*	Memorial Stadium; Lawrence, KS	L 6–24	17,818	
November 12	at Missouri	Memorial Stadium; Columbia, MO (rivalry)	W 7–0		
November 19	at Kansas State	Memorial Stadium; Manhattan, KS (rivalry)	W 19–0	10,000	
*Non-conference game; ^{†}Homecoming
