= Harry Wunsch =

American football player (1910–1954)

No. 45
- Position: Guard

Personal information
- Born: November 20, 1910; Chicago, Illinois, U.S.
- Died: April 30, 1954 (aged 43); South Bend, Indiana, U.S.
- Listed height: 5 ft 11 in (1.80 m)
- Listed weight: 212 lb (96 kg)

Career information
- High school: Central (South Bend)
- College: Notre Dame (1930–1933)

Career history
- St. Louis Gunners (1934)*; Green Bay Packers (1934)
- * Offseason or practice squad member only

Career statistics
- Games played: 2
- Stats at Pro Football Reference

Notre Dame card

Harry Frederick Wunsch (November 20, 1910 – April 30, 1954) was an American professional football guard. He played college football for the Notre Dame Fighting Irish and later for one season in the National Football League (NFL) with the Green Bay Packers in 1934. He also was briefly a member of the St. Louis Gunners.

== Early life ==
Wunsch was born on November 20, 1910, in Chicago, Illinois, and moved to South Bend, Indiana, in 1926. He attended Central High School in South Bend where he played football as a fullback and also competed in track and field, specializing in the broad jump and sprinting events. According to Notre Dame's Official Football Review, Wunsch "could buck a line, pass and block. And he could run."

Wunsch enrolled at the University of Notre Dame in 1930. He tried out for the Notre Dame Fighting Irish football team and was moved to guard, playing for them in 1931 as a sophomore. The Official Football Review described him as "smart, fiery, and fast ... [and] especially adept at pulling out of a line and running interference for the backs." He was noted to be "a hard blocker and a savage tackler. In appearance he is short and fat, but there is not a superfluous ounce of tissue on him. He is rugged and can take as well as give punishment."

As a junior in 1932, Wunsch was benched for being overweight. He dropped 30 pounds (14 kg) for his senior year, weighing 212 pounds (96 kg) at the start of the season, and became a starter at left guard. He was named the team captain for the Fighting Irish's first game of the 1933 season, appointed by coach Hunk Anderson. He was the first Notre Dame captain to be appointed under a new selection system, in which new captains were chosen for each game. He played his last collegiate game in 1933 against the Army Black Knights. He was awarded Notre Dame's athletic council medal that year for being the team's best blocker. While with the Fighting Irish, he was the lone player to be from South Bend, Notre Dame's location.

Notre Dame photo

== Professional career ==
In August 1934, Wunsch signed to play professional football with the St. Louis Gunners. The following month, he joined the Green Bay Packers of the National Football League (NFL), after the Packers purchased his contract from the Gunners. He appeared in two games for the Packers as a backup before being released at the start of October 1934.

Notre Dame write up

== Later life and death ==
After his brief stint in professional football, Wunsch became the commissioner of an organization known as the Indiana National Amateur Football Association and began coaching a semi-professional football team in 1935. He married Elsie Goethals the same year and had three children with her. He died on April 30, 1954, in South Bend, of a heart attack, aged 43.

Wedding day

The balancing act
