= 1932 Detroit Titans football team =

American college football season

1932 Detroit Titans football
- Conference: Independent
- Record: 8–2
- Head coach: Gus Dorais (8th season)
- Home stadium: University of Detroit Stadium

1932 Midwestern college football independents records
	Conf.			Overall
Team	W	L	T	W		L		T
Western State Teachers		–		6	–	0	–	1
Michigan State		–		7	–	1	–	0
Western Reserve		–		7	–	1	–	0
Detroit		–		8	–	2	–	0
Michigan Tech		–		4	–	1	–	0
No. 7 Notre Dame		–		7	–	2	–	0
DePaul		–		5	–	1	–	2
Michigan State Normal		–		5	–	2	–	0
Saint Louis		–		5	–	2	–	0
Marquette		–		4	–	3	–	1
Bowling Green		–		3	–	3	–	1
Central State (MI)		–		3	–	4	–	1
Haskell		–		2	–	5	–	1
Detroit City		–		1	–	6	–	0

The 1932 Detroit Titans football team represented the University of Detroit in the 1932 college football season. Detroit outscored opponents by a combined total of 136 to 66 and finished with an 8–2 record in their eighth year under head coach and College Football Hall of Fame inductee, Gus Dorais. Significant games included victories over West Virginia (26–13) and Oregon State (14–6) and a loss to Michigan State (7–0).

== Schedule ==
Date	Opponent	Site	Result	Attendance	Source
September 30	Michigan State Normal	University of Detroit Stadium; Detroit, MI	W 13–7		
October 7	Washington & Jefferson	University of Detroit Stadium; Detroit, MI	W 7–0		
October 15	at Holy Cross	Fitton Field; Worcester, MA	L 7–9		
October 21	West Virginia	University of Detroit Stadium; Detroit, MI	W 26–13		
October 28	Georgetown	University of Detroit Stadium; Detroit, MI	W 13–0		
November 5	Marquette	University of Detroit Stadium; Detroit, MI	W 7–0		
November 12	at Villanova	Villanova Stadium; Villanova, PA	W 28–12		
November 19	at Michigan State	College Field; East Lansing, MI	L 0–7		
November 24	Oregon State	University of Detroit Stadium; Detroit, MI	W 14–6	12,000	
December 3	at Loyola (LA)	New Orleans, LA	W 21–12	6,000	
