= 1932 Central State Bearcats football team =

American college football season

1932 Central State Bearcats football
- Conference: Independent
- Record: 3–4–1
- Head coach: George Van Bibber (2nd season)
- Home stadium: Alumni Field

1932 Midwestern college football independents records
	Conf.			Overall
Team	W	L	T	W		L		T
Western State Teachers		–		6	–	0	–	1
Michigan State		–		7	–	1	–	0
Western Reserve		–		7	–	1	–	0
Detroit		–		8	–	2	–	0
Michigan Tech		–		4	–	1	–	0
No. 7 Notre Dame		–		7	–	2	–	0
DePaul		–		5	–	1	–	2
Michigan State Normal		–		5	–	2	–	0
Saint Louis		–		5	–	2	–	0
Marquette		–		4	–	3	–	1
Bowling Green		–		3	–	3	–	1
Central State (MI)		–		3	–	4	–	1
Haskell		–		2	–	5	–	1
Detroit City		–		1	–	6	–	0

The 1932 Central State Bearcats football team represented Central State Teachers College, later renamed Central Michigan University, as an independent during the 1932 college football season. In their second season under head coach George Van Bibber, the Bearcats compiled a 3–4–1 record (1–2 against MCC opponents), shut out three of eight opponents, and outscored all opponents by a combined total of 95 to 66. The team lost to its in-state rivals Michigan State Normal (0–28) and Western State Teachers (0–7).

== Schedule ==
Date	Opponent	Site	Result	Source
October 1	at Michigan "B"	Ann Arbor, MI	T 0–0	
October 8	Defiance	Alumni Field; Mount Pleasant, MI	W 32–9	
October 15	Purdue "B"	Alumni Field; Mount Pleasant, MI	L 6–13	
October 22	Michigan State Normal^{†}	Alumni Field; Mount Pleasant, MI (rivalry)	L 0–28	
October 29	at Detroit City College	Kelsey Field; Detroit, MI	W 13–0	
November 5	at Western State Teachers	Western State Teachers College Field; Kalamazoo, MI (rivalry)	L 0–7	
November 12	Michigan Tech	Alumni Field; Mount Pleasant, MI	W 46–0	
November 18	at Alma	Alma, MI	L 0–9	
^{†}Homecoming
