= Orien Crow =

American football player (1912–1994)

Acting Commissioner of Indian Affairs
- In office February 10, 1961 – August 1, 1961
- Preceded by: Glenn L. Emmons
- Succeeded by: Philleo Nash

Personal details
- Born: September 7, 1912
- Died: June 21, 1994 (aged 81)
- Education: Haskell Institute
- Football career

No. 23
- Position: Center

Personal information
- Born: September 7, 1912; Salem, Missouri
- Died: June 21, 1994 (aged 81)
- Listed height: 6 ft 2 in (1.88 m)
- Listed weight: 220 lb (100 kg)

Career information
- College: Haskell

Career history
- Boston Redskins (1933–1934)

John Orien Crow (September 7, 1912 – June 21, 1994), sometimes referred to as Oren Crowe, was an American football center who played professionally in the National Football League (NFL) for the Boston Redskins from 1933 to 1934. A Cherokee, he attended the Haskell Institute—now known as Haskell Indian Nations University—where he played college football. Crow worked for the Bureau of Indian Affairs for many years, starting in 1933 as a clerical worker in North Dakota, and rising to become acting Commissioner in 1961, the first Native American to serve as commissioner since Ely S. Parker in 1871. Once Philleo Nash was appointed permanent commissioner, Crow was named his deputy.
