= 1932 Western State Teachers Hilltoppers football team =

American college football season

1932 Western State Teachers Hilltoppers football
- Conference: Independent
- Record: 6–0–1
- Head coach: Mike Gary (4th season)
- Captain: Trueman Pippel

1932 Midwestern college football independents records
	Conf.			Overall
Team	W	L	T	W		L		T
Western State Teachers		–		6	–	0	–	1
Michigan State		–		7	–	1	–	0
Western Reserve		–		7	–	1	–	0
Detroit		–		8	–	2	–	0
Michigan Tech		–		4	–	1	–	0
No. 7 Notre Dame		–		7	–	2	–	0
DePaul		–		5	–	1	–	2
Michigan State Normal		–		5	–	2	–	0
Saint Louis		–		5	–	2	–	0
Marquette		–		4	–	3	–	1
Bowling Green		–		3	–	3	–	1
Central State (MI)		–		3	–	4	–	1
Haskell		–		2	–	5	–	1
Detroit City		–		1	–	6	–	0

The 1932 Western State Teachers Hilltoppers football team was an American football team that represented Western State Teachers College (later renamed Western Michigan University) as an independent during the 1932 college football season. In their fourth season under head coach Mike Gary, the Hilltoppers compiled a 6–0–1 record, shut out six of seven opponents (including a scoreless tie with DePaul), and outscored all opponents by a combined total of 174 to 6. Tackle Trueman Pippel was the team captain.

== Schedule ==
Date	Opponent	Site	Result	Source
September 24	Hope	Western State Teachers College Field; Kalamazoo, MI	W 31–6	
October 1	at North Central	Naperville, IL	W 27–0	
October 8	at DePaul	Chicago, IL	T 0–0	
October 15	St. Viator	Western State Teachers College Field; Kalamazoo, MI	W 7–0	
October 29	Iowa State Teachers	Western State Teachers College Field; Kalamazoo, MI	W 26–0	
November 5	Central State (MI)	Western State Teachers College Field; Kalamazoo, MI (rivalry)	W 7–0	
November 12	Adrian	Western State Teachers College Field; Kalamazoo, MI	W 76–0	
