= 1932 Michigan State Normal Hurons football team =

American college football season

1932 Michigan State Normal Hurons football
- Conference: Independent
- Record: 5–2
- Head coach: Elton Rynearson (11th season)
- Captain: Carl J. Simmons
- Home stadium: Normal Field

1932 Midwestern college football independents records
	Conf.			Overall
Team	W	L	T	W		L		T
Western State Teachers		–		6	–	0	–	1
Michigan State		–		7	–	1	–	0
Western Reserve		–		7	–	1	–	0
Detroit		–		8	–	2	–	0
Michigan Tech		–		4	–	1	–	0
No. 7 Notre Dame		–		7	–	2	–	0
DePaul		–		5	–	1	–	2
Michigan State Normal		–		5	–	2	–	0
Saint Louis		–		5	–	2	–	0
Marquette		–		4	–	3	–	1
Bowling Green		–		3	–	3	–	1
Central State (MI)		–		3	–	4	–	1
Haskell		–		2	–	5	–	1
Detroit City		–		1	–	6	–	0

The 1932 Michigan State Normal Hurons football team represented Michigan State Normal College (later renamed Eastern Michigan University) as an independent during the 1932 college football season. In their 11th season under head coach Elton Rynearson, the Hurons compiled a record of 5–2 and outscored their opponents by a combined total of 145 to 31. Carl J. Simmons was the team captain. The team played its home games at Normal Field on the school's campus in Ypsilanti, Michigan.

== Schedule ==
Date	Opponent	Site	Result	Attendance	Source
September 30	at Detroit	University of Detroit Stadium; Detroit, MI	L 7–13		
October 7	at Northern Michigan	Marquette, MI	W 50–0		
October 15	Alma	Ypsilanti, MI	W 27–0		
October 22	at Central State (MI)	Mount Pleasant, MI (rivalry)	W 28–0		
October 29	Michigan "B"	Ypsilanti, MI	W 15–6		
November 5	South Dakota State*	Ypsilanti, MI	W 12–0		
November 13	Iowa State Teachers	Ypsilanti, MI	L 6–12		
*Non-conference game
