= 1932 Michigan State Spartans football team =

American college football season

1932 Michigan State Spartans football
- Conference: Independent
- Record: 7–1
- Head coach: Jim Crowley (4th season)
- MVP: Bob Monnett
- Captains: Abe Eliowitz; Bob Monnett
- Home stadium: College Field

1932 Midwestern college football independents records
| | Conf. | | | Overall |
| Team | W | L | T | W | | L | | T |
|---|---|---|---|---|---|---|---|---|
| Western State Teachers | | – | | 6 | – | 0 | – | 1 |
| Michigan State | | – | | 7 | – | 1 | – | 0 |
| Western Reserve | | – | | 7 | – | 1 | – | 0 |
| Detroit | | – | | 8 | – | 2 | – | 0 |
| Michigan Tech | | – | | 4 | – | 1 | – | 0 |
| No. 7 Notre Dame | | – | | 7 | – | 2 | – | 0 |
| DePaul | | – | | 5 | – | 1 | – | 2 |
| Michigan State Normal | | – | | 5 | – | 2 | – | 0 |
| Saint Louis | | – | | 5 | – | 2 | – | 0 |
| Marquette | | – | | 4 | – | 3 | – | 1 |
| Bowling Green | | – | | 3 | – | 3 | – | 1 |
| Central State (MI) | | – | | 3 | – | 4 | – | 1 |
| Haskell | | – | | 2 | – | 5 | – | 1 |
| Detroit City | | – | | 1 | – | 6 | – | 0 |

The 1932 Michigan State Spartans football team represented Michigan State College as an independent during the 1932 college football season. In their fourth and final season under head coach Jim Crowley, the Spartans compiled a 7–1 record. The team's only loss came in their annual rivalry game with Michigan by a 26 to 0 score. In inter-sectional play, the team defeated Fordham (19-13), Syracuse (27-13), and South Dakota (20-6).

Quarterback Bob Monnett was selected by the Newspaper Enterprise Association (NEA) as a second-team player on the 1932 College Football All-America Team.

== Schedule ==
| Date | Opponent | Site | Result | Attendance | Source |
|---|---|---|---|---|---|
| September 24 | Alma | College Field; East Lansing, MI | W 93–0 | | |
| October 1 | at Michigan | Michigan Stadium; Ann Arbor, MI (rivalry) | L 0–26 | 33,786 | |
| October 8 | Grinnell | College Field; East Lansing, MI | W 27–6 | | |
| October 15 | Illinois Wesleyan | College Field; East Lansing, MI | W 27–0 | | |
| October 22 | at Fordham | Polo Grounds; New York, NY | W 19–13 | 20,000 | |
| October 29 | at Syracuse | Archbold Stadium; Syracuse, NY | W 27–13 | | |
| November 5 | South Dakota^{†} | College Field; East Lansing, MI | W 20–6 | | |
| November 19 | Detroit | College Field; East Lansing, MI | W 7–0 | | |
^{†}Homecoming

== Game summaries ==
=== Michigan ===
Week 1: Michigan State at Michigan

| Team | 1 | 2 | 3 | 4 | Total |
|---|---|---|---|---|---|
| Michigan St. | 0 | 0 | 0 | 0 | 0 |
| • Michigan | 7 | 7 | 6 | 6 | 26 |

- Date: October 1, 1932
- Location: Michigan Stadium
  Ann Arbor, MI
- Game attendance: 33,786
- Referee: F. A. Lambert (Ohio St.)

On October 1, 1932, the Spartans played Michigan in Ann Arbor. Michigan won the game, 26–0. Fullback John Regeczi ran for a touchdown in the first quarter following a long drive. Additional touchdowns were scored by Stanley Fay, John Heston, and Herman Everhardus. Quarterback Harry Newman had a 35-yard punt return and successfully kicked two point after touchdown (PAT) attempts.
