= Hunk Anderson =

American football player and coach (1898–1978)

- c. 1920

Biographical details
- Born: September 22, 1898; Calumet, Michigan, U.S.
- Died: April 24, 1978 (aged 79); West Palm Beach, Florida, U.S.

Playing career
- 1918–1921: Notre Dame
- 1920–1921: Canton Bulldogs
- 1922–1923: Chicago Bears
- 1923: Cleveland Indians
- 1924–1925: Chicago Bears
- Position: Guard

Coaching career (HC unless noted)
- 1927: Notre Dame (assistant)
- 1928–1929: Saint Louis
- 1930: Notre Dame (line)
- 1931–1933: Notre Dame
- 1934–1936: NC State
- 1937: Michigan (line)
- 1939: Detroit Lions (assistant)
- 1942–1945: Chicago Bears

Head coaching record
- Overall: 34–34–4 (college); 24–12 (NFL)

Accomplishments and honors

Awards
- NFL 1920s All-Decade Team; First-team All-Pro (1922)
- College Football Hall of Fame; Inducted in 1974 (profile)

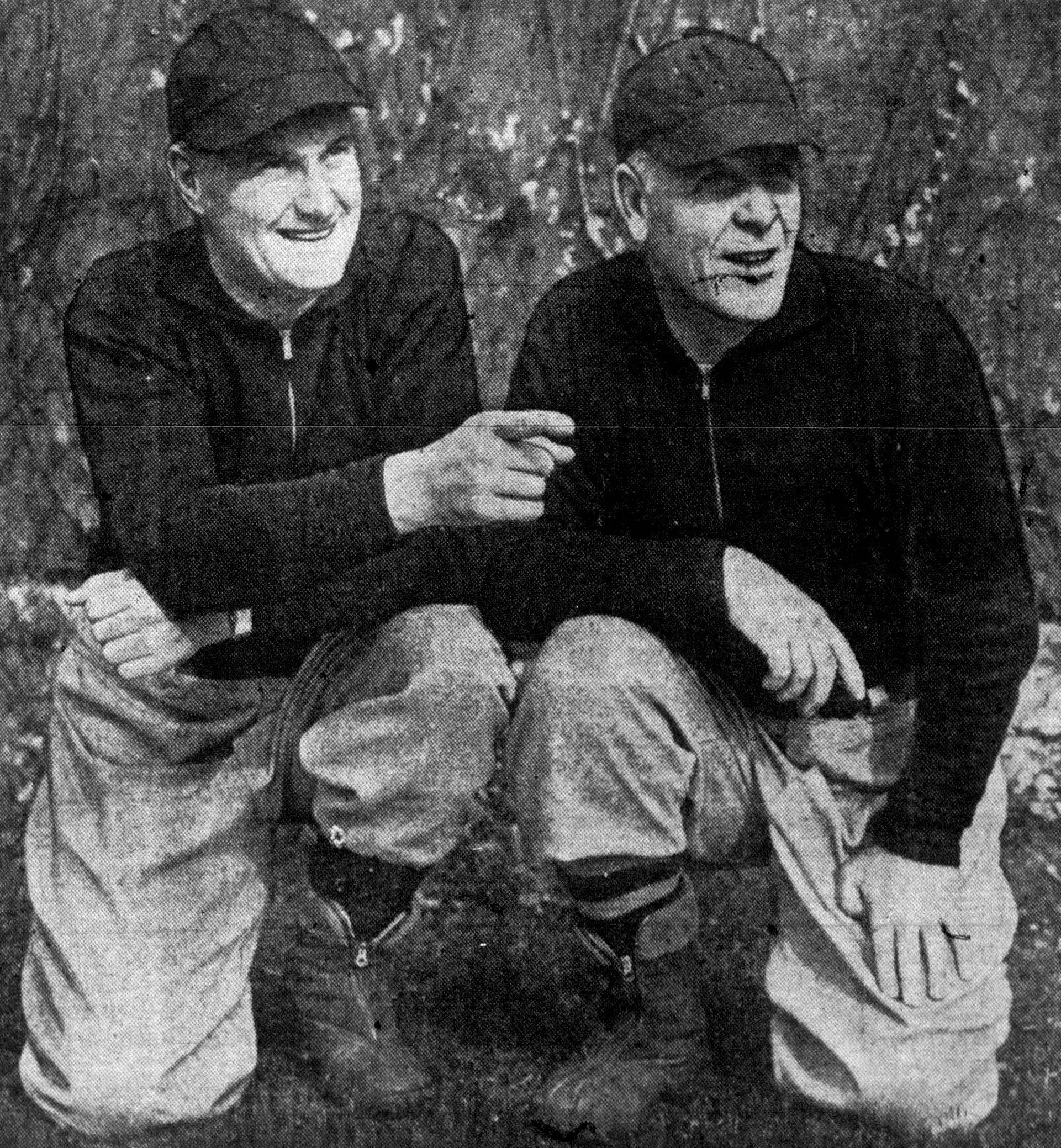
Anderson (right) alongside Chicago Bears co-head coach Luke Johnsos (left), in 1942.

Heartley William "Hunk" Anderson (September 22, 1898 – April 24, 1978) was an American football player and coach. He served as the head football coach at the Saint Louis University (1928–1929), University of Notre Dame (1931–1933), and North Carolina State University (1934–1936), compiling a career college football record of 34–34–4. From 1942 to 1945, Anderson was the head coach for the Chicago Bears of the National Football League (NFL), tallying a mark of 24–12 and winning the 1943 NFL Championship.

From 1918 to 1921, Anderson played as a guard for the Notre Dame football team, under new head coach Knute Rockne. During his time in South Bend he played under an assumed name for the Canton Bulldogs in 1920–1921, but Anderson later argued that he had only played in exhibition games. From 1922 to 1926, he played professionally for the Cleveland Indians and the Chicago Bears. Anderson played in 39 career games while starting in 32 of them. In 1939, he was an assistant coach for the Detroit Lions under Gus Henderson.

Born in Calumet, Michigan, on the Keweenaw Peninsula in the Upper Peninsula, Anderson attended Calumet High School. He was 5 ft 11 in (1.80 m) and weighed 170 lb (77 kg). Anderson was named to the National Football League 1920s All-Decade Team, and is one of only two players on the list not in the Pro Football Hall of Fame. He was inducted into the College Football Hall of Fame as a player in 1974.

A head coach at Saint Louis for two years, he returned to Notre Dame as an assistant under Rockne in 1930 and the Irish won all ten games. The following spring, Rockne was killed in a plane crash, and Anderson was promoted to head coach ten days later.

== Head coaching record ==
=== College ===
Year	Team	Overall	Conference	Standing
Saint Louis Billikens (Independent) (1928–1929)
1928	Saint Louis	4–4–1		
1929	Saint Louis	3–4–1		
Saint Louis:		7–8–1		
Notre Dame Fighting Irish (Independent) (1931–1933)
1931	Notre Dame	6–2–1		
1932	Notre Dame	7–2		
1933	Notre Dame	3–5–2		
Notre Dame:		16–9–2		
NC State Wolfpack (Southern Conference) (1934–1936)
1934	NC State	2–6–1	1–3–1	8th
1935	NC State	6–4	2–2	T–5th
1936	NC State	3–7	2–4	12th
NC State:		11–17–1	5–9–1	
Total:		34–34–4		

=== NFL ===
Team	Year	Regular season					Postseason			
Team	Year	Won	Lost	Ties	Win %	Finish	Won	Lost	Win %	Result
CHI	1942	6	0	0	1.000	1st in NFL Western	0	1	.000	Lost to Washington Redskins in NFL Championship Game.
CHI	1943	8	1	1	.850	1st in NFL Western	1	0	1.000	1943 NFL Champions
CHI	1944	6	3	1	.650	2nd in NFL Western	–	–	–	–
CHI	1945	3	7	0	.300	4th in NFL Western	–	–	–	–
CHI Total		23	11	2	.667		–	–	–	–
Total		23	11	2	.667		–	–	–	–

== Personal life ==
Anderson was a Freemason.
