= 1930 Big Ten Conference football season =

- Sport: Football
- Number of teams: 10
- Co-champions: Michigan, Northwestern
- Runners-up: Purdue
- Season MVP: Wes Fesler

Football seasons
- ← 1929 1931 →

1930 Big Ten Conference football standings
| | Conf. | | | | | Overall |
| Team | W | | L | | T | W | | L | | T |
|---|---|---|---|---|---|---|---|---|---|---|
| No. 5 Michigan + | 5 | – | 0 | – | 0 | 8 | – | 0 | – | 1 |
| No. 4 Northwestern + | 5 | – | 0 | – | 0 | 7 | – | 1 | – | 0 |
| Purdue | 4 | – | 2 | – | 0 | 6 | – | 2 | – | 0 |
| Wisconsin | 2 | – | 2 | – | 1 | 6 | – | 2 | – | 1 |
| Ohio State | 2 | – | 2 | – | 1 | 5 | – | 2 | – | 1 |
| Minnesota | 1 | – | 3 | – | 0 | 3 | – | 4 | – | 1 |
| Indiana | 1 | – | 3 | – | 0 | 2 | – | 5 | – | 1 |
| Illinois | 1 | – | 4 | – | 0 | 3 | – | 5 | – | 0 |
| Iowa | 0 | – | 1 | – | 0 | 4 | – | 4 | – | 0 |
| Chicago | 0 | – | 4 | – | 0 | 2 | – | 5 | – | 2 |
+ – Conference co-champions; Rankings from Dickinson System

The 1930 Big Ten Conference football season was the 35th season of college football played by the member schools of the Big Ten Conference (also known as the Western Conference) and was a part of the 1930 college football season.

The 1930 Michigan Wolverines football team, under head coach Harry Kipke, compiled an 8-0-1 record, led the conference in scoring defense (2.6 points allowed per game), and was ranked No. 5 in the Dickinson System. Quarterback Harry Newman and center Maynard Morrison won first-team All-Big Ten honors. The 1930 Michigan team was the first of four consecutive Michigan teams to win or tie for the Big Ten championship, losing only one game from 1930 to 1933.

The 1930 Northwestern Wildcats football team, under head coach Dick Hanley, compiled a 7–1 record, tied with Michigan for the Big Ten championship, and was ranked No. 4 in the Dickinson System. End Frank Baker was a consensus first-team All-American. Guard Wade Woodworth and fullback Lafayette Russell also received first-team All-American honors from multiple selectors.

Ohio State end Wes Fesler won the Chicago Tribune Silver Football trophy as the most valuable player in the Big Ten and was also selected as a consensus first-team All-American.

== Season overview ==
=== Results and team statistics ===
| Conf. Rank | Team | Head coach | Overall record | Conf. record | DS rank | PPG | PAG | MVP |
|---|---|---|---|---|---|---|---|---|
| 1 (tie) | Michigan | Harry Kipke | 8–0–1 | 5–0 | #5 | 12.3 | 2.6 | Jack Wheeler |
| 1 (tie) | Northwestern | Dick Hanley | 7–1 | 5–0 | #4 | 22.8 | 4.5 | Bob Clark |
| 3 | Purdue | Noble Kizer | 6–2 | 4–2 | NR | 18.8 | 5.1 | George Stearns |
| 4 (tie) | Wisconsin | Glenn Thistlethwaite | 6–2–1 | 2–2–1 | NR | 25.2 | 4.4 | Bill Lusby |
| 4 (tie) | Ohio State | Sam Willaman | 5–2–1 | 2–2–1 | NR | 17.4 | 6.0 | Wes Fesler |
| 6 (tie) | Minnesota | Fritz Crisler | 3–4–1 | 1–3 | NR | 15.8 | 10.1 | Biggie Munn |
| 6 (tie) | Indiana | Harlan Page | 2–5–1 | 1–3 | NR | 3.5 | 15.1 | Joe Zeller |
| 8 | Illinois | Robert Zuppke | 3–5 | 1–4 | NR | 9.8 | 12.1 | Stan Bodman |
| 9 | Iowa | Burt Ingwersen | 4–4 | 0–1 | NR | 11.0 | 9.3 | Oliver Sansen |
| 10 | Chicago | Amos Alonzo Stagg | 2–5–2 | 0–4 | NR | 3.7 | 14.3 | Wally Knudson |

Key
DS = Rankings from Dickinson System. See 1930 college football season
PPG = Average of points scored per game
PAG = Average of points allowed per game
MVP = Most valuable player as voted by players on each team as part of the voting process to determine the winner of the Chicago Tribune Silver Football trophy

=== Bowl games ===
No Big Ten teams participated in any bowl games during the 1930 season.

== All-Big Ten players ==
The following players were picked by the Associated Press (AP), the United Press (UP), the Newspaper Enterprise Association (NEA), and/or the conference coaches (Coaches) as first-team players on the 1930 All-Big Ten Conference football team.

| Position | Name | Team | Selectors |
|---|---|---|---|
| Quarterback | Harry Newman | Michigan | AP, UP, Coaches [halfback] |
| Quarterback | Jack White | Purdue | NEA, Coaches |
| Halfback | Lee Hanley | Northwestern | AP, UP, NEA |
| Halfback | Eddie Risk | Purdue | AP, Coaches |
| Halfback | Lew Hinchman | Ohio State | UP |
| Fullback | Lafayette Russell | Northwestern | UP, NEA |
| Fullback | Pug Rentner | Northwestern | AP, Coaches |
| End | Frank Baker | Northwestern | AP, UP, NEA, Coaches |
| End | Wes Fesler | Ohio State | AP, UP, NEA, Coaches |
| Tackle | Milo Lubratovich | Wisconsin | AP, UP, NEA, Coaches |
| Tackle | George Van Bibber | Purdue | AP, UP, NEA, Coaches |
| Guard | Wade Woodworth | Northwestern | AP, UP, NEA, Coaches |
| Guard | Biggie Munn | Minnesota | UP, NEA, Coaches |
| Guard | Greg Kabat | Wisconsin | AP |
| Center | Maynard Morrison | Michigan | AP, UP, NEA, Coaches |

== All-Americans ==
Three Big Ten players were selected as consensus first-team players on the 1930 College Football All-America Team. They were:

| Position | Name | Team | Selectors |
|---|---|---|---|
| End | Wes Fesler | Ohio State | AAB, AP, COL, INS, NANA, NEA, UP |
| End | Frank Baker | Northwestern | AP, INS, UP |
| Tackle | Milo Lubratovich | Wisconsin | NEA, UP |

Other Big Ten players received first-team honors from at least one selector. They were:

| Position | Name | Team | Selectors |
|---|---|---|---|
| Guard | Wade Woodworth | Northwestern | AP, NEA, NYEP, LAT |
| Fullback | Lafayette Russell | Northwestern | AAB, NANA, NYEP |
