= Jack Wheeler (American football) =

American football player (1908–1990)

- Wheeler cropped from 1930 Michigan team photo

No. 64 – Michigan Wolverines
- Positions: Halfback, fullback, quarterback

Personal information
- Born: October 31, 1908; Bay City, Michigan, U.S.
- Died: February 26, 1990 (aged 81); Midland, Michigan, U.S.
- Listed height: 5 ft 8 in (1.73 m)
- Listed weight: 155 lb (70 kg)

Career information
- High school: Bay City Central High School
- College: Michigan (1928–1930)

Awards and highlights
- Second-team All-Big Ten (1930); MVP, 1930 Michigan Wolverines football team

Clare Jack Wheeler (October 31, 1908 – February 26, 1990) was an American football player. He played in the backfield for the University of Michigan from 1928 to 1930 and was the Most Valuable Player on the 1930 Michigan Wolverines football team.

== Early life ==
A native of Bay City, Michigan, Wheeler began to attain athletic prominence playing halfback and quarterback for the football team at Bay City Central High School from 1924 to 1926.

== College career ==
After graduating from high school, he enrolled at the University of Michigan and played on the freshman football team in 1927. As a sophomore in 1928, Wheeler started three games at the halfback position for Michigan's varsity football team. As a junior in 1929, he started two games at the fullback position.

Wheeler had his best season as a senior in 1930. He demonstrated his versatility by playing all three backfield positions (quarterback, halfback and fullback) for the undefeated 1930 Michigan Wolverines football team that compiled a record of 8–0–1.

In the 1930 season opener, Wheeler was the Wolverines' starting quarterback and scored two touchdowns in a 33–0 victory over Denison].

His performance in the fourth game of the 1930 season helped secure his reputation. Michigan trailed Purdue 13–0 at the end of the first quarter. Wheeler and sophomore quarterback Harry Newman were sent into the game in the second quarter and led Michigan to a come-from-behind victory and a final score of 14–13. Wheeler did most of the ball carrying on the drive that resulted in Michigan's winning touchdown. Wheeler scored the winning touchdown with an eight-yard run on "the old 83 play." The following week, Wheeler was Michigan's leading rusher in a 13– win over Ohio State. He also caught a 20-yard touchdown pass from Harry Newman in a 15–7 win over Illinois. In the seventh week of the 1930 season, Wheeler scored the only touchdown in Michigan's 7–0 win over Minnesota in the annual competition for the Little Brown Jug. Wheeler scored the touchdown in the first quarter on a 45-yard punt return which a newspaper account of the game described as follows:

"Wheeler's run will go down as one of Michigan's, classics. He got the ball after a low, twisting kick by [Biggie] Munn had traveled to the Minnesota 45-yard line. Wheeler gathered it in and charged. He hit two Minnesota tacklers and knifed his way between them. He staggered a yard or two from the impact and sidestepped another Gopher tackler. Morrison came across like a charging bull to take another from Wheeler's path. He waved away, and slid yards across the goal line on his dive for a touchdown."

Michigan head coach Harry Kipke praised Wheeler's performance during the 1930 season as follows:

"He was our offensive spark, as well as our best ground gainer. He lacked confidence up to this year, it seems, but he had it when this season opened and he got better as the season progressed. He worked effectively with Simrall, Hudson and Newman in carrying out the running attack. He blocked well for them, and they for him."

Despite his slight build at 155 pounds, Wheeler scored 30 of the 111 points scored by Michigan in 1930 and was selected as a first-team All-Big Ten player by Claire Burcky of the Newspaper Editors Association. Burckey explained his selection of Wheeler as follows: "The reason Jack Wheeler, the Bay City boy, made my team is because he kept Michigan going when Harry Newman failed. Wheeler's punt handling, run-backs and interception of passes provided the brightest bits of ball lugging Michigan showed to the conference this season."

Wheeler was voted by his teammates on the 1930 Michigan team as the recipient of the Most Valuable Player award. He also finished second behind Wes Fesler in the voting for the Chicago Tribune Silver Football trophy awarded to the Most Valuable Player in the Big Ten Conference.

== Late life ==
In February 1990, Wheeler died at age 81. He was a resident of Midland, Michigan at the time of his death.
