= 1930 Wisconsin Badgers football team =

American college football season

1930 Wisconsin Badgers football
- Conference: Big Ten Conference
- Record: 6–2–1 (2–2–1 Big Ten)
- Head coach: Glenn Thistlethwaite (4th season)
- MVP: Ernie Lusby
- Captain: Milt Gantenbein
- Home stadium: Camp Randall Stadium

1930 Big Ten Conference football standings
	Conf.					Overall
Team	W		L		T	W		L		T
No. 5 Michigan +	5	–	0	–	0	8	–	0	–	1
No. 4 Northwestern +	5	–	0	–	0	7	–	1	–	0
Purdue	4	–	2	–	0	6	–	2	–	0
Wisconsin	2	–	2	–	1	6	–	2	–	1
Ohio State	2	–	2	–	1	5	–	2	–	1
Minnesota	1	–	3	–	0	3	–	4	–	1
Indiana	1	–	3	–	0	2	–	5	–	1
Illinois	1	–	4	–	0	3	–	5	–	0
Iowa	0	–	1	–	0	4	–	4	–	0
Chicago	0	–	4	–	0	2	–	5	–	2
+ – Conference co-champions; Rankings from Dickinson System

The 1930 Wisconsin Badgers football team was an American football team that represented the University of Wisconsin in the 1930 Big Ten Conference football season. The team compiled a 6–2–1 record (2–2–1 against conference opponents), finished in a tie for fourth place in the Big Ten Conference, and outscored all opponents by a combined total of 227 to 40. Glenn Thistlethwaite was in his fourth year as Wisconsin's head coach.

Tackle Milo Lubratovich was a consensus first-team player on both the 1930 College Football All-America Team and the 1930 All-Big Ten Conference football team. Guard Greg Kabat was selected by the Associated Press (AP) as a first-team player on the All-Big Ten team, and end Milt Gantenbein was selected by the AP, UP, and NEA as a second-team All-Big Ten player.

Halfback Ernie Lusby was selected as the team's most valuable player. Gantenbein was the team captain.

The team played its home games at Camp Randall Stadium, which had a capacity of 38,293. During the 1930 season, the average attendance at home games was 18,175.

== Schedule ==
Date	Opponent	Site	Result	Attendance	Source
October 4	Lawrence*	Camp Randall Stadium; Madison, WI	W 53–6	20,000	
October 4	Carleton*	Camp Randall Stadium; Madison, WI	W 28–0	20,000	
October 11	Chicago	Camp Randall Stadium; Madison, WI	W 34–0	30,000	
October 18	Penn*^{†}	Camp Randall Stadium; Madison, WI	W 27–0	18,175	
October 25	at Purdue	Ross–Ade Stadium; West Lafayette, IN	L 6–7	25,000	
November 1	at Ohio State	Ohio Stadium; Columbus, OH	T 0–0	40,488	
November 8	South Dakota State*	Camp Randall Stadium; Madison, WI	W 58–7		
November 15	at Northwestern	Dyche Stadium; Evanston, IL	L 7–20	45,000	
November 22	Minnesota	Camp Randall Stadium; Madison, WI (rivalry)	W 14–0	32,000	
*Non-conference game; ^{†}Homecoming
