= 1929 All-Pacific Coast football team =

American all-star college football team

The 1929 All-Pacific Coast football team consists of American football players chosen by various organizations for All-Pacific Coast teams for the 1929 college football season. The organizations selecting teams in 1934 included the Associated Press (AP), the Newspaper Enterprise Association, and the United Press (UP).

== All-Pacific Coast selections ==
=== Quarterback ===
- Marshall Duffield, USC (AP-1; UP-1)
- Russ Saunders, USC (NEA-1)

=== Halfbacks ===
- Benny Lom, California (AP-1; NEA-1; UP-1)
- Merle Hufford, Washington (AP-1; NEA-1)
- Stud Stennett, St. Mary's (UP-1)
- John Geehan, Washington (AP-2)
- Carl Ellingsen, Wahsington State (AP-2)

=== Fullback ===
- Charles O. Smalling, Stanford (NEA-1; UP-1)
- Elmer Schwartz, Washington State (AP-1)
- Carl Gilmore, Oregon State (AP-2)

=== Ends ===
- Francis Tappaan, USC (AP-1; NEA-1; UP-1)
- Donald "Mush" Muller, Stanford (AP-1; NEA-1)
- Norton (UP-1)
- Bill McKalip, Oregon State (AP-2)
- Russell Striff, Oregon State (AP-2)

=== Tackles ===
- Austin Colbert, Oregon (AP-1; NEA-1)
- George Ackerman, St. Mary's (AP-1; UP-1)
- M. Shields, Oregon (NEA-1 [guard]; UP-1)
- Paul Schwegler, Washington (NEA-1; AP-2) (College Football Hall of Fame)
- Russ Peterson, Montana (AP-2)

=== Guards ===
- Bert Schwarz, California (AP-1; NEA-1; UP-1)
- Nate Barragar, USC (AP-1; UP-1)
- Clarence Muhlick, Montana (AP-2)
- Bill Greger, Washington (AP-2)

=== Centers ===
- Roy Riegels, California (AP-1; NEA-1; UP-1)
- Mel Hein, Washington State (AP-2) (College Football Hall of Fame)

== Key ==
AP = Associated Press

NEA = Newspaper Enterprise Association, "compiled from selections by sports writers of NEA client newspapers"

UP = United Press

Bold = Consensus first-team selection by at least two of the AP, NEA and UP

== See also ==
- 1929 College Football All-America Team
