= 1930 Michigan Wolverines football team =

American college football season

1930 Michigan Wolverines football
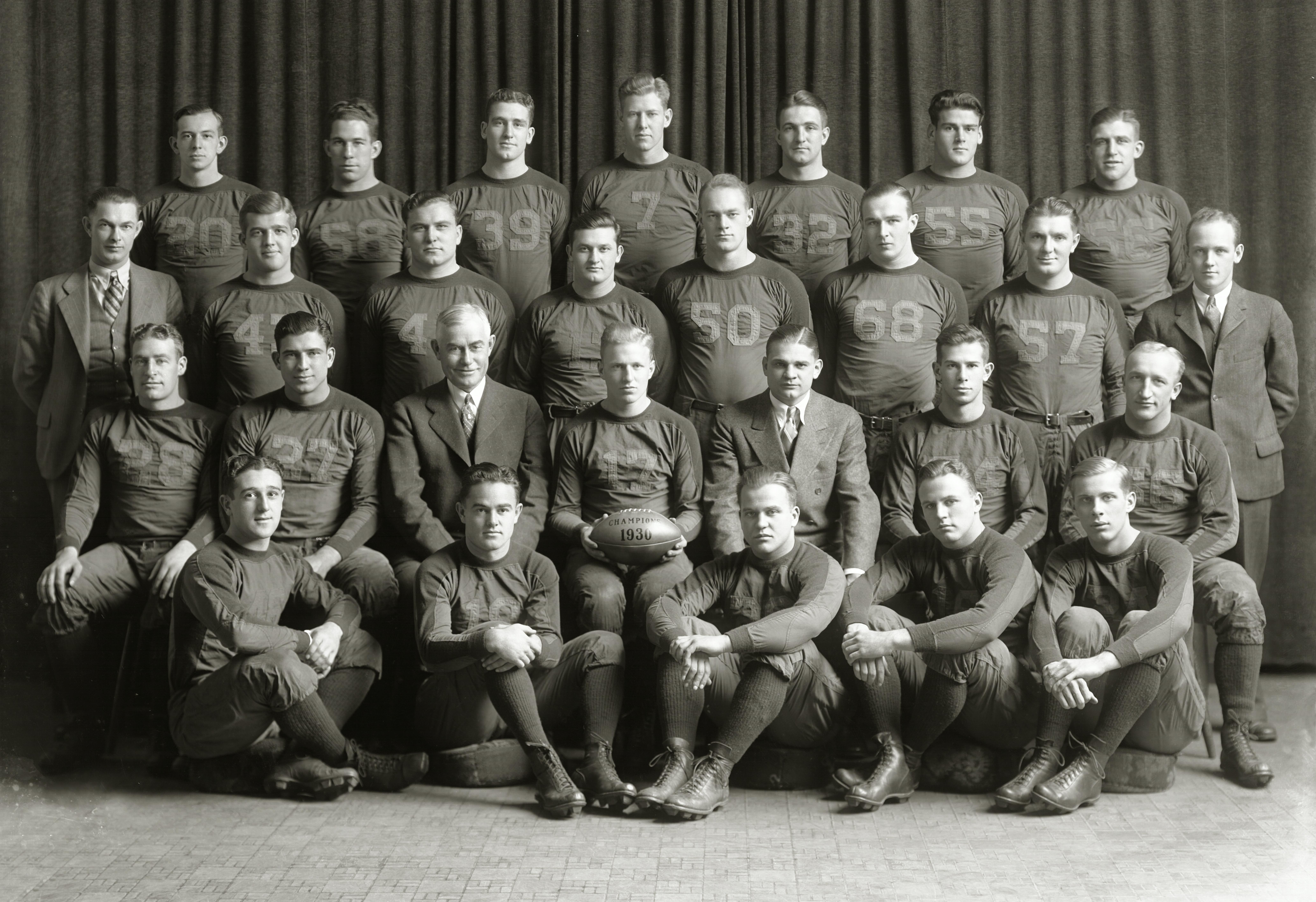

Big Ten co-champion
- Conference: Big Ten Conference
- Record: 8–0–1 (5–0 Big Ten)
- Head coach: Harry Kipke (2nd season)
- MVP: Jack Wheeler
- Captain: James Simrall
- Home stadium: Michigan Stadium

Uniform
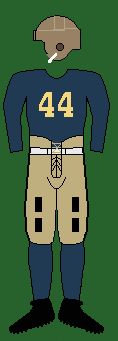

1930 Big Ten Conference football standings
	Conf.					Overall
Team	W		L		T	W		L		T
No. 5 Michigan +	5	–	0	–	0	8	–	0	–	1
No. 4 Northwestern +	5	–	0	–	0	7	–	1	–	0
Purdue	4	–	2	–	0	6	–	2	–	0
Wisconsin	2	–	2	–	1	6	–	2	–	1
Ohio State	2	–	2	–	1	5	–	2	–	1
Minnesota	1	–	3	–	0	3	–	4	–	1
Indiana	1	–	3	–	0	2	–	5	–	1
Illinois	1	–	4	–	0	3	–	5	–	0
Iowa	0	–	1	–	0	4	–	4	–	0
Chicago	0	–	4	–	0	2	–	5	–	2
+ – Conference co-champions; Rankings from Dickinson System

The 1930 Michigan Wolverines football team represented the University of Michigan in the 1930 college football season. The head coach was former Michigan star, 31-year-old Harry Kipke, in his second year in the position.

The team went through the 1930 season with an undefeated 8–0–1 record, outscored opponents 111 to 23, and tied for the Big Ten Conference championship with Northwestern. The 1930 season marked the debut of Michigan's College Football Hall of Fame quarterback Harry Newman, who became a star in his first season leading the Wolverines' offense. In Newman's three years at Michigan, the Wolverines lost only one game, won three Big Ten Conference championships, and had a combined record of 24–1–2. Further, the 1930 team was the first of four consecutive Michigan teams coached by Harry Kipke to win or tie for the Big Ten championship, losing only one game from 1930 to 1933.

Right halfback James Simrall was the team captain, and left halfback Jack Wheeler was selected as the Most Valuable Player. Six players from the 1930 team were selected to All-Big Ten teams, and five went on to play in the National Football League.

== Schedule ==
Date	Opponent	Site	Result	Attendance
September 27	Denison*	Michigan Stadium; Ann Arbor, MI	W 33–0	12,760
September 27	Michigan State Normal*	Michigan Stadium; Ann Arbor, MI	W 7–0	12,760
October 4	Michigan State*	Michigan Stadium; Ann Arbor, MI (rivalry)	T 0–0	49,900
October 11	Purdue	Michigan Stadium; Ann Arbor, MI	W 14–13	38,851
October 18	at Ohio State	Ohio Stadium; Columbus, OH (rivalry)	W 13–0	68,459
October 25	Illinois^{†}	Michigan Stadium; Ann Arbor, MI (rivalry)	W 15–7	63,191
November 8	at Harvard*	Harvard Stadium; Boston, MA	W 6–3	43,913
November 15	Minnesota	Michigan Stadium; Ann Arbor, MI (Little Brown Jug)	W 7–0	54,944
November 22	Chicago	Michigan Stadium; Ann Arbor, MI (rivalry)	W 16–0	42,078
*Non-conference game; ^{†}Homecoming

== Game summaries ==
=== Michigan 33, Denison 0 ===
Michigan opened the 1930 football season on September 27, 1930, with an unusual football double-header, playing two games on the same afternoon. In the first game against Denison College, Coach Kipke played his "second team" squad for the entire game. The Wolverines beat Denison by a score of 33 to 0. Michigan's touchdowns against Denison were scored by quarterback Jack Wheeler (2), fullback DuVal Goldsmith, left halfback Ralph Wills, and end William D. O'Neil, Jr.

Michigan's starting lineup against Denison consisted entirely of second-team players: Jay Sikkenga (left end), William Gitman (left tackle), Leslie Douglass (left guard), Carlton Soelberg (center), Leslie Avery (right guard), Carl Castle (right tackle), Ivy Williamson (right end), Jack Wheeler (quarterback), Ralph Wills (left halfback), Claude Stoll (right halfback), and DuVal Goldsmith (fullback).

=== Michigan 7, Michigan State Normal 0 ===
The second game of the double-header matched the Wolverines against Michigan State Normal (now known as Eastern Michigan University) from nearby Ypsilanti. According to a United Press account of the game, the Hurons "outplayed the Wolves in two quarters, held them even in another, and broke just long enough in the third period to allow Michigan to flash through two forward passes and a lateral pass for a touchdown." Michigan's sole touchdown in the Michigan State Normal game was scored by Charles DeBaker, a "fast-running halfback from Muskegon."

Michigan's starting lineup against Michigan State Normal consisted of Michigan's first-team players: Bill Hewitt (left end), Tom Samuels (left tackle), Omer LaJeunesse (right guard), Maynard Morrison (center), Francis Cornwell (right guard), Claire Purdum (right tackle), Norman Daniels (right end), Estel Tessmer (quarterback), William Heston (left halfback), James Simrall (right halfback), and Roy Hudson (fullback).

=== Michigan 0, Michigan State 0 ===
	1	2	3	4	Total
Spartans	0	0	0	0	0
Wolverines	0	0	0	0	0

In the second week of the season, Michigan played the Michigan State Spartans to a scoreless tie in front of a crowd of 49,900 at Michigan Stadium. The game marked the end of a losing streak for the Spartans against the Wolverines dating back to 1916. Michigan had crossed the goal line near the end of the first half, but the play was called back on an offside penalty; the first half ended before Michigan could conclude the drive. One of Michigan's key players, Bill Hewitt sustained an injured ankle while playing at left end in the game; Hewitt did not play the rest of the season. The Associated Press reported that Michigan's passing attack kept the ball in Michigan State's territory much of the time but the Wolverines "lacked the scoring punch."

The starting lineup for Michigan in the game was Bill Hewitt (left end), Howie Auer (left tackle), Francis Cornwell (left guard), Maynard Morrison (center), Omer LaJeunesse (right guard), Samuels (right tackle), Norman Daniels (right end), Estel Tessmer (quarterback), William Heston (left halfback), James Simrall (right halfback), and Roy Hudson (fullback). Substitutions were by Williamson (left end), Hozer and Purdum (right guard), Debaker and Heston (left halfback), and Newman (quarterback).

=== Michigan 14, Purdue 13 ===
	1	2	3	4	Total
Boilermakers	13	0	0	0	13
Wolverines	0	14	0	0	14

In the third week of the 1930 season, Michigan played the defending Big Ten Conference champion Purdue Boilermakers at Michigan Stadium. The game marked the first start for Harry Newman as Michigan's quarterback, a position he would hold for three seasons. After Purdue took a 13-0 lead at the end of the first quarter, Michigan came back with two touchdowns in the second quarter to win the game by a score of 14 to 13. The first Michigan touchdown came early in the second quarter when Norman Daniels, playing at right end as a substitute for Leo Draveling, caught a long pass from quarterback Newman and sprinted into the end zone. Later in the second quarter, Michigan's center Maynard Morrison recovered a Purdue fumble at the Boilermakers' 25-yard line. After advancing the ball to the five-yard line, Jack Wheeler, playing at left halfback as a substitute for Heston, ran the ball across the goal line for Michigan's second touchdown. Newman converted both point after touchdown kicks, which proved to be the difference in the game, as Purdue had missed on one of its extra point attempts.

Michigan's starting lineup against Purdue was Roderick Cox (left end), Howie Auer (left tackle), Stanley Hozer (left guard), Maynard Morrison (center), Francis Cornwell (right guard), Tom Samuels (right tackle), Leo Draveling (right end), Estel Tessmer (quarterback), William Heston (left halfback), James Simrall (right halfback), and Roy Hudson (fullback).

=== Michigan 13, Ohio State 0 ===
	1	2	3	4	Total
Wolverines	0	7	6	0	13
Buckeyes	0	0	0	0	0

In the fourth week of the season, Michigan traveled to Columbus, Ohio to face the Ohio State Buckeyes. In front of a crowd of 68,000, quarterback Newman used the forward passing game to defeat the Buckeyes by a score of 13 to 0. The Associated Press wrote that Michigan dominated the game with its "lightning like attack" consisting of "long deadly passes." Michigan's first touchdown came late in the first half. The drive began with Harry Newman returning a punt to Michigan's 46-yard line. On the next play, Newman threw a long pass to Michigan's captain James Simrall, who caught the ball at the 15-yard line and was tackled at the one-yard line. On the second play of the drive, Newman called a quarterback sneak and carried the ball across the goal line. Newman also kicked the extra point. Michigan's second touchdown came on a 14-yard run by an Ohio native, fullback Roy Hudson. The extra point attempt by Newman was blocked. Newman added to his status as the star of the game with an interception to end a late drive by the Buckeyes. According to the AP account of the game, "the final gun had hardly sounded before Michigan's ninety piece band was parading obliquely down the field blaring 'Hail to the Victors', Michigan's song of triumph and destiny."

Michigan's starting lineup against Ohio State was Ivy Williamson (left end), Claire Purdum (left tackle), Stanley Hozer (left guard), Maynard Morrison (center), Francis Cornwell (right guard), Samuels (right tackle), Roderick Cox (right end), Harry Newman (quarterback), Jack Wheeler (left halfback), James Simrall (right halfback), and Roy Hudson (fullback). Michigan substitutions were Omer LaJuenesse (left guard), Leo Draveling (right tackle), and Wallace Miller (right tackle).

=== Michigan 15, Illinois 7 ===
	1	2	3	4	Total
Illini	0	0	7	0	7
Wolverines	6	3	0	6	15

In the fifth week of the season, Michigan returned to Ann Arbor for its homecoming game against Illinois. Michigan won the game by a score of 15 to 7. Quarterback Newman, playing in his third game as Michigan's quarterback, was referred to by the United Press as Michigan's "crack Jewish field general." The UP report praised Newman's performance:

"Harry Newman, Michigan's stocky sophomore quarterback, revived memories of his illustrious predecessor, Benny Friedman ... It was Newman's smart generalship, accurate passing and place-kicking which enabled Michigan to continue its undefeated march toward the Big Ten football championship ... Newman, one-time pupil of Friedman, Michigan's great quarterback, had a hand in every point scored by the Wolverines in winning their third straight conference victcry."

Michigan's first touchdown followed an Illinois turnover less than four minutes into the game. Illinois fumbled a punt, and Michigan's guard Omer Lajeunesse recovered the ball on Illinois's 25-yard line. After two running plays advanced the ball five yards, Newman threw a 20-yard touchdown pass to Jack Wheeler. Newman's attempt at the extra point failed. Michigan next score came after an Illinois punt was blocked and recovered at the Illinois 10-yard line. After losing five yards on three plays, Newman kicked a field goal from a difficult angle to give Michigan a 9 to 0 lead at half-time. In the third quarter, Illinois scored on a 60-yard punt return by quarterback Berry. Newman led the final Michigan scoring drive in the fourth quarter. Taking over at the 50-yard line, Newman threw the ball 30 yards to right end Ivy Williamson, who ran another 10 yards before being tackled at the 10-yard line. On third down, Newman dropped back for an apparent place kick, but passed the ball over the goal line to Roy Hudson for a touchdown. Newman's extra point attempt was blocked for a final score of 15 to 7. Newman attempted only four passes in the game, but completed three of them for 72 yards.

Michigan's starting lineup against Illinois was Stanley Hozer (left end), Claude Stoll (left tackle), Omer LaJeunesse (left guard), Maynard Morrison (center), Francis Cornwell (right guard), Claire Purdum (right tackle), Ivy Williamson (right end), Harry Newman (quarterback), Jack Wheeler (left halfback), James Simrall (right halfback) and Roy Hudson (fullback). Substitution for Michigan were Norman Daniels (left end), Tom Samuels (left tackle), Robert Morgan (left guard), Wallace Miller (right tackle), Leo Draveling (right tackle), Harry Eastman, Jr. (right halfback,) and Charles DeBaker (right halfback).

=== Michigan 6, Harvard 3 ===
	1	2	3	4	Total
Wolverines	0	0	0	6	6
Harvard	0	0	0	3	3

For its sixth week of competition, Michigan traveled to Cambridge, Massachusetts to face the Harvard Crimson. The game was scoreless after three periods, with Harvard having the best scoring opportunities. Harvard had driven deep into Michigan territory twice, and one field goal attempt was blocked by Maynard Morrison and another was missed. Early in the fourth quarter, Harvard drove the ball to Michigan's 12-yard line. On fourth down, Harvard successfully converted on a field goal attempt to take a 3 to 0 lead. In the closing minutes of the game, Newman led Michigan's final drive. Newman and Roy Hudson began the drive running the ball to Harvard's 35-yard line. It was from that point that Newman threw the winning touchdown pass described by the Associated Press as follows:

"Newman then backed up to the 50-yard line, waited until Hudson, whose jersey, fore and aft, bore the supposedly ill-fated number 13, had time to clear the Harvard secondaries. When that speedy fullback gained the open, in the vicinity of the 30-yard marker, Newman tossed him a lofty pass and he out-footed his Harvard pursuers across their goal line."

The United Press described Michigan's late scoring drive as follows:

"A mighty march down the field in the closing minutes of play, climaxed by a beautiful 30 yard forward pass from the magic hand of Harry Newman, enabled a suddenly inspired Michigan eleven to come from behind and defeat Harvard on its home gridiron Saturday for the first time in nearly 50 years of rivalry."

Michigan's starting lineup against Harvard was Stanley Hozer (left end), Howie Auer (left tackle), Omer LaJeunesse (left guard), Maynard Morrison (center), Francis Cornwell (right guard), Leo Draveling (right tackle), Ivy Williamson (right end), Harry Newman (quarterback), Jack Wheeler (left halfback), James Simrall (right halfback), and Roy Hudson (fullback).

=== Michigan 7, Minnesota 0 ===
	1	2	3	4	Total
Gophers	0	0	0	0	0
Wolverines	7	0	0	0	7

In the seventh week of the season, Michigan returned to Michigan Stadium to play the Minnesota Golden Gophers in the annual competition for the Little Brown Jug. The game marked the first appearance by Fritz Crisler as a head coach at Michigan Stadium. Crisler was in his first year as head coach at Minnesota; he took over as Michigan's head coach eight years later after Kipke was fired. Michigan won the game 7 to 0. The game's only score came in the first quarter on a 45-yard punt return by Michigan's left halfback, Jack Wheeler. The return was off of a punt by Minnesota's All-American Biggie Munn, who would later join Crisler's coaching staff at Michigan. A newspaper account of the game described Wheeler's run as follows:

"Wheeler's run will go down as one of Michigan's, classics. He got the ball after a low, twisting kick by Munn had traveled to the Minnesota 45-yard line. Wheeler gathered it in and charged. He hit two Minnesota tacklers and knifed his way between them. He staggered a yard or two from the impact and sidestepped another Gopher tackler. Morrison came across like a charging bull to take another from Wheeler's path. He waved away, and slid yards across the goal line on his dive for a touchdown."

Despite the lack of scoring, the Associated Press reported that the game was "a desperately-fought breath-taking football battle."

Michigan's starting lineup against Minnesota was Stanley Hozer (left end), Tom Samuels (left tackle), Omer LaJeunesse (left guard), Maynard Morrison (center), Francis Cornwell (right guard), Leo Draveling (right tackle), Ivy Williamson (right end), Harry Newman (quarterback), Jack Wheeler (left halfback), James Simrall (right halfback), and Roy Hudson (fullback).

=== Michigan 16, Chicago 0 ===
	1	2	3	4	Total
Maroons	0	0	0	0	0
Wolverines	0	3	6	7	16

Michigan closed its 1930 football season against the Chicago Maroons coached by football legend Amos Alonzo Stagg. Michigan won the game, played at Michigan Stadium, by a score of 16 to 0. Michigan's fullback Roy Hudson scored two touchdowns in the game, and Stanley Hozer added the extra point and a field goal. In the third quarter, the Michigan captain, James Simrall, threw a touchdown pass to Hudson from mid-field. Michigan's second touchdown capped a seven-play drive in which Jack Wheeler and Hudson alternated running the ball.

Michigan's starting lineup against Chicago was Stanley Hozer (left end), Claire Purdum (left tackle), Omer LaJeunesse (left guard), Maynard Morrison (center), Francis Cornwell (right guard), Leo Draveling (right tackle), Ivy Williamson (right end), Harry Newman (quarterback), Jack Wheeler (left halfback), James Simrall (right halfback) and Roy Hudson (fullback).

=== Six All-Big Ten players ===
Six members of the 1930 Michigan team were selected to All-Big Ten teams. All-Big Ten teams were named by the Associated Press ("AP"), the United Press ("UP"), Knute Rockne ("Rockne"), the NEA wire service's Claire Burcky ("Burcky"), and sports writer Hank Casserly ("Casserly").

  - Maynard Morrison at center - first team selection by AP, UP, Rockne, Burcky and Casserly
  - Harry Newman at quarterback - first team selection by the AP, UP and Casserly; second team by Burcky
  - Jack Wheeler at left halfback - first team selection by Burcky; AP second team; third team by UP and Casserly
  - Leo F. Draveling at right tackle - first team selection by Casserly; UP third team
  - Ivan Williams at right end - third team selection by UP and Casserly
  - Roy Hudson at fullback - second-team selection by Casserly

In selecting Newman as its first-team All-Big Ten quarterback, the AP wrote: "Newman was picked by the majority over John White of Purdue for the quarterback post because he undoubtedly was the one big offensive spark that enabled Michigan's comparatively light scoring machine to win a share of the championship porridge. He was one of the best passers in the conference and won game after game for the Wolverines with his tosses. Newman was hailed during the season as a second Bennie Friedman." In announcing his choice of Newman, Knute Rockne wrote: "One or the marks of class that distinguishes a star quarterback from an ordinary number caller is to name the right play in the pinches. When this quarterback not only calls the right play, but, as in the case of Newman of Michigan, himself executes forward passes that click for touchdowns, then this quarterback must be classed with the great, although, he is just a sophomore. Newman did just this." Writing for the United Press, Dixon Stewart noted: "Newman's generalship, kicking and passing was responsible for Michigan winning its three hardest conference games. Not since Benny Friedman was at his hey-dey has the Big Ten produced such a quarterback."

In selecting Morrison as his first-team center, Knute Rockne wrote: "Morrison of Michigan didn't have a bad pass all year, his weight made him absolutely impregnable on line defense, and yet he was shifty enough to go back into the secondary and defend against the forward pass when necessary."

Claire Burcky of the NEA explained his selection of Jack Wheeler as a first-team player as follows: "The reason Jack Wheeler, the Bay City boy, made my team is because he kept Michigan going when Harry Newman failed. Wheeler's punt handling, run-backs and interception of passes provided the brightest bits of ball lugging Michigan showed to the conference this season."

Despite having completed an undefeated season, no Michigan player was selected on the Associated Press All-American first, second or third teams, though honorable mention recognition was given to Francis Cornwell at guard, Maynard Morrison at center, Jack Wheeler at halfback, Harry Newman at quarterback, and Roy Hudson at fullback.

== Players ==
=== Varsity letter winners ===
- Howie Auer, Bay City, Michigan - started 3 games at left tackle, 1 game at right tackle
- Francis Cornwell, Grand Rapids, Michigan - started 7 games at right guard, 1 game at left guard
- Roderick Cox, Birmingham, Michigan - started 1 game at left end, 1 game at right end
- Norm Daniels, Detroit, Michigan, Southeastern H.S. - started 2 games at right end
- Charles DeBaker - halfback
- Leslie H. Douglass, Gary, Indiana, Emerson H.S. - started 1 game at left guard
- Leo F. Draveling, Port Huron, Michigan - started 3 games at right tackle, 1 game at right end
- Harry Eastman, Jr., Detroit, Michigan - halfback
- William Heston, Jr., Detroit, Michigan, Northwestern H.S. - started 3 games at left halfback
- Bill Hewitt, Bay City, Michigan - started 2 games at left end
- Stanley Hozer, Muskegon, Michigan - started 4 games at left end, 2 games at left tackle, 2 games at left guard
- Roy Hudson, Girard, Ohio - started 8 games at fullback
- Omer LaJeunesse, Iron Mountain, Michigan - started 5 games at left guard, 1 game at right guard
- Wallace B. Miller - tackle
- Robert C. Morgan - tackle
- Maynard Morrison, Royal Oak, Michigan - starter at center
- Harry Newman, Detroit, Michigan, Northern H.S. - started 5 games at quarterback
- Claire Purdum, Warren, Ohio - started 2 games at left tackle, 2 games at right tackle
- Tom Samuels, Canton, Ohio, McKinley H.S. - started 3 games at right tackle, 3 games at left tackle
- James Simrall, Lexington, Kentucky - started 7 games at right halfback, 1 game at left halfback
- Estel S. Tessmer, Ann Arbor, Michigan - started 3 games at quarterback
- William H. Unger - center
- Jack Wheeler, Bay City, Michigan - started 2 games at left halfback, 1 game at right halfback, 1 game at quarterback
- Ivan Williamson, Toledo, Ohio - started 5 games at right end, 1 game at left end

=== Varsity reserves ===
- Leslie C. Avery, South Haven, Michigan - started 1 game at right guard
- Carl A. Castle - center
- Russell Damm - end
- William H. Gitman, Dayton, Ohio - started 1 game at left tackle
- DuVal P. Goldsmith, Christiansburg, Virginia - started 1 game at fullback
- Abe Marcovsky - guard
- Ward H. Oehmann - guard
- Karl S. Richardson - guard
- Sylvester C. Shea - end
- Jay H. Sikkenga, Muskegon Heights, Michigan - started 1 game at left end
- Carlton Soelberg, Sioux City, Iowa - center
- Claude R. Stoll, Ann Arbor, Michigan - started 2 games at left halfback, 1 game at right halfback
- Ralph Wills, Flint, Michigan - started 1 game at left halfback
- Fielding H. Yost, Jr. - halfback

=== Players in the NFL ===
Five starters and two reserve players from the 1930 Wolverines football team later played in the National Football League. End Bill Hewitt played nine years in the NFL for the Chicago Bears and Philadelphia Eagles and was later inducted into the Pro Football Hall of Fame. Quarterback Harry Newman played for the New York Giants, set an NFL single-season record for passing yards as a rookie, and threw the first touchdown pass in an NFL championship game in leading the Giants to the 1933 NFL Championship. Other starters from the 1930 Wolverines to play in the NFL are Maynard Morrison, who played for the Brooklyn Dodgers, Leo Draveling who played for the Cincinnati Reds, and Howie Auer who played for the Philadelphia Eagles. In addition, two freshmen who were included on the 1930 roster, Chuck Bernard and Fred Ratterman, also went on to play in the NFL.

== Awards and honors ==
- Captain: James Simrall
- Most Valuable Player: Jack Wheeler
- Meyer Morton Award: Estil Tessmer

== Coaching staff ==
- Head coach: Harry Kipke
- Assistant coaches: Jack Blott, Franklin Cappon, Ray Courtright, Cliff Keen, Bennie Oosterbaan, Wally Weber
- Trainer: Ray Roberts
- Manager: Arthur W. Highfield, Austin Humber (assistant), William Burt (assistant), John Sauchuck (assistant), William Belknap (assistant)
