= Harry Ebding =

American football player (1906–1980)

- Ebding in 1936

No. 8, 30, 33, 11
- Positions: End, kicker

Personal information
- Born: September 12, 1906; Walla Walla, Washington, U.S.
- Died: September 11, 1980 (aged 73); Santa Clara County, California, U.S.
- Listed height: 5 ft 11 in (1.80 m)
- Listed weight: 199 lb (90 kg)

Career information
- High school: Walla Walla
- College: Saint Mary's (CA)

Career history
- Portsmouth Spartans/Detroit Lions (1931–1937)

Awards and highlights
- NFL champion (1935); NFL All-Pro (1933); NFL receiving yards leader (1934); Second-team All-American (1930); First-team All-PCC (1930)

Career statistics
- Games played: 81
- Games started: 53
- Receiving yards: 971
- Receiving touchdowns: 8
- Stats at Pro Football Reference

Harry Joseph "Irish" Ebding (September 12, 1906 – September 11, 1980) was an American professional football player who was an end for seven seasons in the National Football League (NFL). A collegiate All-American for Saint Mary's College in California, Ebding played in the NFL for the Portsmouth Spartans (1931–1933) and their successor organization, the Detroit Lions (1934–1937).

In 1932, Ebding finished third in the NFL in total yards receiving, with 171. He was named All-Pro in 1933.

== Biography ==
=== Early life ===
Harry Ebding was born September 12, 1906, in Walla Walla, Washington. Both of Harry's parents died during his boyhood years. His mother died when Harry was 15, apparently from botulism resulting from the consumption of improperly home-canned asparagus.

He attended Walla Walla High School in that city, playing football and basketball.

=== Collegiate career ===
Ebding attended Saint Mary's College, a private Catholic school located in Moraga, California, known for having one of the top college football programs on the Pacific coast. During 1927, his first year at the school, Ebding played halfback for the freshman team.

St. Mary's end Harry Ebding strikes a fierce defensive pose, 1930.

He did not stay long in the backfield, however, at the first scrimmage of the 1928 St. Mary's team, head coach Ed "Slip" Madigan moved Ebding to end. He was regarded as a promising prospect playing on both sides of the ball under the one-platoon system of the day, said by one news reporter to be both "extremely good on defense" and "equally adept to snagging passes and getting down under punts."

Ebding also played basketball for the Gaels, starring as a forward on the 1927 rookie team before being promoted to the varsity squad the following year. He continued to play basketball throughout his college career, quickly winning a starting and emerging as a key player on the team. He was also a boxer for the Gaels for their inaugural team in 1931, fighting in the heavyweight classification.

Ebding saw expanded playing time during his 1929 junior year, starting at right end and helping to lead St. Mary's to an undefeated record of 8–0–1. He emerged as the team star for the Gaels, winning a position as left end of the second team for the 1929 All-Pacific Coast squad selected by the West coast sportswriters of the United Press. Ebding was regarded by one observer as "one of the fastest and roughest ends on the coast" of the 1929 season.

He was elected by his teammates as a co-captain of the Galloping Gaels team ahead of his 1930 senior season. The job of kicking off the football and placekicking was added to his tasks in his last collegiate season. Ebding's reputation had grown throughout his time at St. Mary's, to the point where he was regarded as one of the best ends on the West coast as he entered his senior year.

St. Mary's was a major football power of the day and college and professional scouts kept their eyes on Ebding and the team. The 1930 season opener for the Galloping Gaels against West Coast Army was attended by an estimated two dozen scouts. The Gaels won in front of a crowd of 12,000 fans at Kezar Stadium by the resounding score of 32–0, doing nothing to dampen enthusiasm for the player and the team.

This marked the start of an outstanding 8–1 season for the San Francisco Bay Area school, marked by five shutouts, a 21–6 win over UCLA, and a cross-country 20–12 victory over Fordham.

=== Professional career: Portsmouth ===
Prior to 1936, there was no NFL draft and players were signed on the basis of talent scouting. As a star of the prominent St. Mary's team, Ebding was noticed and in August 1931 he signed a contract to play with the Portsmouth Spartans of the National Football League (NFL). Joining him at camp with the Portsmouth squad was his former teammate and co-captain at St. Mary's, halfback Fred "Stud" Stennett. Terms of Ebding's deal were not published.

St. Mary's co-captains of 1930, Fred "Stud" Stennett (30) and Harry Ebding (21), both played for the 1931 Portsmouth Spartans of the NFL.

Ebding won a place on the Portsmouth squad and was soon starting at right end. The team started the 1931 season like a house on fire, holding their opponents scoreless in five of the season's first eight games — all of which were won by the Spartans. A season highlight came in the penultimate week, when in Chicago Ebding blocked a punt by the Cardinals and recovered the ball on Chicago's 34 yard line. The team was unable to convert the possession to points, however, and wound up losing the game by a single point, 20–19, en route to a record of 11 wins and 3 losses — losing the league championship to the Green Bay Packers by a single game.

Ebding started 13 of the Spartans' 14 games in 1931, although no statistical records beyond wins and losses were kept by the National Football League prior to 1932, so his precise offensive accomplishments are lost to history. He did not score a touchdown during the year, however.

The 1932 NFL season marked the beginning of systematic league statistical record-keeping and Harry Ebding was the receiving leader out the gate, topping the entire league with 11 catches for 119 yards for the first five games of the season. He was also the hero of Week 6, snagging a 32-yard pass against the New York Giants and setting up Portsmouth for the only touchdown in a 6–0 victory. This would prove to be virtually all of Ebding's offensive output for the year, however, as he would finish the season with 14 catches for 171 yards (an average of 14.3 yards per catch) and 1 touchdown.

Portsmouth would finish the season with a record of 6–1-4, tied with the Chicago Bears and their record of 6–1–6. League champions had historically been declared based upon won-loss percentage, as ratified by vote of the owners, but bad feelings still remained from the 1925 NFL season, in which the 9–0 Chicago Bears had been declared the champion over the 9-0 Pottsville Maroons. Nor did the head-to-head match-up of the two teams provide illumination, since the Bears and Spartans had battled to two ties, 13–13 and 7–7. As a solution, it was determined that the Spartans and Bears should meet in Chicago for a one game "Championship Play-off" to determine the 1932 NFL championship.

Due to blizzard conditions, this first NFL Championship game was moved indoors to Chicago Stadium, home of the Chicago Black Hawks hockey team. The arena was too small for a proper football field, measuring 60 yards from goal line to goal line, and the two parties agreed that each time a team crossed midfield, they would automatically be backed up 20 yards, resulting in a field with a virtual size of 80 yards. Harry Edbing started at right end for Portsmouth but the Spartans would be scoreless that day, with Chicago winning 9–0 on a 4th quarter pass from Bronko Nagurski to Red Grange and a Portsmouth safety. Portsmouth finished the game with just two passes completed, for 29 yards.

=== Death and legacy ===
Harry Ebding died September 11, 1980, in Santa Clara County, California. He was 73 years old at the time of his death.
