= Hank Bruder =

American football player (1907–1970)

No. 13, 47, 27, 18, 5
- Position: Back

Personal information
- Born: November 22, 1907; Pekin, Illinois, U.S.
- Died: June 29, 1970 (aged 62); Mattoon, Illinois, U.S.
- Listed height: 6 ft 0 in (1.83 m)
- Listed weight: 199 lb (90 kg)

Career information
- High school: Pekin
- College: Northwestern

Career history
- Green Bay Packers (1931–1939); Pittsburgh Steelers (1940)

Awards and highlights
- 3× NFL champion (1931, 1936, 1939); Green Bay Packers Hall of Fame; Second-team All-American (1930); 2× Second-team All-Big Ten (1928, 1930); Big Ten champion (1930)

Career NFL statistics
- Games played: 106
- Games started: 59
- Stats at Pro Football Reference

Henry George Bruder Jr. (November 22, 1907 – June 29, 1970) was an American football player in the National Football League (NFL). He played nine years with the Green Bay Packers from 1931 to 1939 and was inducted into the Green Bay Packers Hall of Fame in 1972. Bruder attended Northwestern University, where he was a member of the Delta Upsilon fraternity.

He was part of the offensive line that blocked for Pro Football Hall of Fame back Johnny Blood. Bruder also spent some time as a professional wrestler.

== See also ==
- List of gridiron football players who became professional wrestlers
