= Ted Beckett =

American football player (1907–1978)

- Beckett from "The Blue and Gold" (1931)

Profile
- Position: Guard

Personal information
- Born: February 15, 1907; Marshfield, Oregon, U.S.
- Died: June 1978 (aged 71); Reno, Nevada, U.S.

Career information
- College: Cal (1930)

Awards and highlights
- Consensus All-American (1930); First-team All-PCC (1930)

Ted Beckett (February 15, 1907 – June 1978) was an American football player. He played college football at University of California, Berkeley and was a consensus selection at the guard position on the 1930 College Football All-America Team.

After graduation Beckett served on the Cal coaching staff for the 1931 season. He became head football coach as Santa Barbara State College for the 1932 season, after which he retired from football.

Beckett went into the insurance business in 1933 and remained in that field until 1942. During World War II he became a foreman at a shipyard.

Following the war, Beckett moved to Orinda, California with his wife Kathryn and raised a family, moving occupationally into the field homebuilding and real estate sales.

He died in 1978 at Reno, Nevada, at the age of 71.
