= Johnny Kitzmiller =

American football player (1904–1986)

Johnny "Dutch" Kitzmiller
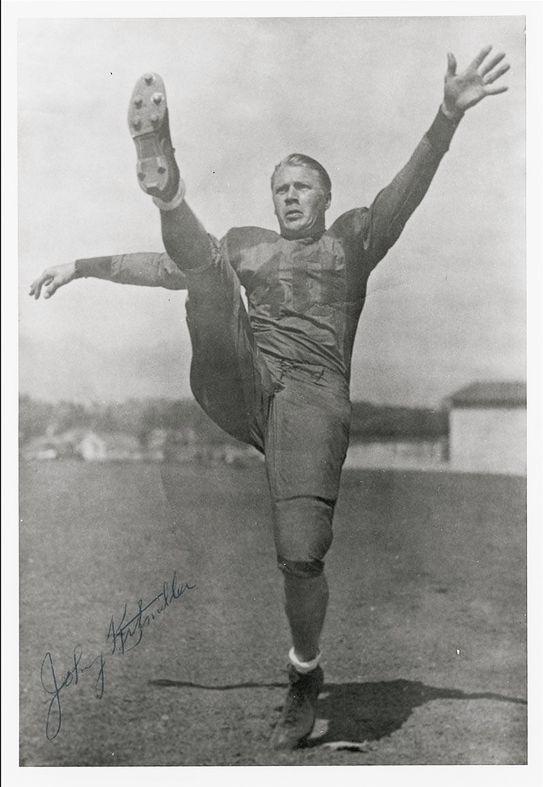
- Johnny Kitzmiller ("The Flying Dutchman") in 1930 with the Oregon Ducks

No. 40
- Positions: Fullback, halfback

Personal information
- Born: November 25, 1904; Harrisburg, Pennsylvania, U.S.
- Died: April 26, 1986 (aged 81); Dallas, Oregon, U.S.
- Listed height: 6 ft 0 in (1.83 m)
- Listed weight: 165 lb (75 kg)

Career information
- College: Oregon

Career history
- New York Giants (1931)

Awards and highlights
- Second-team All-American (1930); First-team All-PCC (1930)

Career statistics
- Games: 14
- Rushing touchdowns: 4
- PATs made: 3
- Stats at Pro Football Reference
- College Football Hall of Fame

John Wesley "Dutch" Kitzmiller (November 25, 1904 – April 26, 1986) was an American professional football player who was a fullback for the New York Giants of the National Football League (NFL). He played college football at Oregon and was later inducted into the College Football Hall of Fame and the Oregon Sports Hall of Fame.

== College career ==
A halfback from Harrisburg, Pennsylvania, he played on the 1925 Harrisburg Technical High School team and scored 21 points in their championship game. Kitzmiller had planned to attend the United States Military Academy and play for coach John McEwan's football team. But, just as he was about to enroll, McEwan was hired as the coach of the University of Oregon Ducks and Kitzmiller followed him to Oregon.

At Oregon, Kitzmiller led the team to national prominence, with the team winning 23 of 30 games, including two losses suffered after Kitzmiller broke his leg in the 1929 Civil War. In addition to halfback, Kitzmiller also played defensive back and placekicker, and twice earned all-Pacific Coast Conference honors. His nickname "The Flying Dutchman" was from his spectacular tackles made though he weighed just 165 pounds (75 kg).

== After college ==
Kitzmiller played one season as a fullback with the New York Giants in 1931, then returned to Oregon as an assistant coach from 1932 to 1935. He served in the Army Air Force in India during World War II, returning to Oregon's Willamette Valley after the war to establish a manufacturing company. He was elected to the College Football Hall of Fame in 1969, the University of Oregon Athletic Hall of Fame in 1992, and the Oregon Sports Hall of Fame in 1980.

Kitzmiller died in Oregon in 1986.
