= Dick Fencl =

American football player (1910–1972)

No. 29
- Position: End

Personal information
- Born: February 24, 1910; Chicago, Illinois, U.S.
- Died: June 25, 1972 (aged 62); Chicago, Illinois, U.S.
- Listed height: 5 ft 11 in (1.80 m)
- Listed weight: 160 lb (73 kg)

Career information
- High school: St. Philip (Chicago)
- College: Northwestern (1929–1932)

Career history
- Philadelphia Eagles (1933)

Awards and highlights
- Second-team All-Big Ten (1931)
- Stats at Pro Football Reference

Richard John Fencl (February 24, 1910 – June 25, 1972) was an American professional football end who played one season with the Philadelphia Eagles of the National Football League (NFL). He played college football at Northwestern University.

== Early life and college ==
Richard John Fencl was born on February 24, 1910, in Chicago, Illinois. He attended St. Philip High School in Chicago, Illinois.

He was a member of the Northwestern Wildcats of Northwestern University from 1929 to 1932 and a three-year letterman from 1930 to 1932. He was named second-team All-Big Ten by the United Press in 1931.

== Professional career ==
Fencl was signed by the Philadelphia Eagles of the National Football League on November 1, 1933. He played in five games, starting one, for the Eagles during the team's inaugural 1933 season, catching one pass for 20 yards. In early September 1934, it was reported that Fencl would not be returning to the Eagles as he had taken a job at an oil firm in Indiana.

== Personal life ==
Fencl died on June 25, 1972, in Chicago.
