= Harold Ely =

American football player (1909–1983)

No. 275, 2
- Position: Tackle

Personal information
- Born: December 26, 1909; Des Moines, Iowa, U.S.
- Died: July 12, 1983 (aged 73); Jasper, Alabama, U.S.
- Listed height: 6 ft 2 in (1.88 m)
- Listed weight: 268 lb (122 kg)

Career information
- High school: Des Moines) (IA) Roosevelt
- College: Iowa (1927–1930)

Career history
- Chicago Bears (1932); Brooklyn Dodgers (1932–1934)

Awards and highlights
- Second-team All-Big Ten (1930)
- Stats at Pro Football Reference

Harold Ellsworth Ely (December 26, 1909 – July 12, 1983) was an American football tackle who played three seasons in the National Football League (NFL) with the Chicago Bears and Brooklyn Dodgers. He played college football at the University of Iowa.

== Early life and college ==
Harold Ellsworth Ely was born on December 26, 1909, in Des Moines, Iowa. He attended Theodore Roosevelt High School in Des Moines, Iowa.

Ely was a member of the Iowa Hawkeyes of the University of Iowa from 1927 to 1930 and a three-year letterman from 1928 to 1930. He was named second-team All-Big Ten by the United Press as a senior in 1930.

== Professional career ==
Ely played in six games, starting one, for the Chicago Bears during the 1932 season. In November 1932, he was said to have been the heaviest pro football player at the time, weighing 275 pounds. A New York Times article from November 2, 1932, also said that he wore the number #275 on his jersey.

Ely played in 24 games, starting twenty, for the Brooklyn Dodgers from 1932 to 1934.

== Death ==
Ely died on July 12, 1983, in Jasper, Alabama.
