= Leo Draveling =

American football player (1907–1955)

No. 51
- Positions: End, tackle

Personal information
- Born: June 23, 1907; Port Huron, Michigan, U.S.
- Died: July 2, 1955 (aged 48); Columbus Township, Michigan, U.S.
- Listed height: 6 ft 2 in (1.88 m)
- Listed weight: 210 lb (95 kg)

Career information
- High school: Port Huron
- College: Michigan (1928–1930)

Career history

Playing
- Cincinnati Reds (1933)

Coaching
- Akron High School (NY) (1931) Head coach; Canisius (1932) Line coach; Detroit Tech (1934–1935) Head coach

Operations
- Akron High School (NY) (1931–1932) Athletic director

Career statistics
- Games played: 9
- Games started: 2
- Stats at Pro Football Reference

Leo Frank "Firpo" Draveling (June 23, 1907 – July 2, 1955) was an American football player and coach. He played college football for the Michigan Wolverines football teams from 1928 to 1930 and professionally for the Cincinnati Reds of the National Football League (NFL) in 1933. Draveling served as the head football coach at the Detroit Institute of Technology from 1934 to 1935. At Michigan, he also wrestled and competed in the hammer throw for the Michigan track and field team.

== Early life ==
Draveling was born on June 23, 1907, in Port Huron, Michigan. In 1925, he played on the Port Huron High School football team that was "undefeated and unscored upon."

== University of Michigan ==
Draveling enrolled at the University of Michigan in 1927 and played football for the Wolverines football teams of 1928, 1929 and 1930. As a sophomore in 1928, Draveling started seven games as Michigan's right end. Draveling played a key role in the 1928 Michigan–Ohio State game. He put the Wolverines in the lead, 7–6, when he recovered a loose ball in the end zone. An Ohio State player allowed a punt to roll past him thinking it would reach the end zone for a touchback. The Ohio State player was blocked into the ball, and Draveling gained possession long enough for the officials to rule that he had scored a touchdown.

In 1929, Draveling started eight games (seven at right end) for the Wolverines. A newspaper feature story on the 1929 Wolverines said the following about Michigan's ends:

"One may search a long time before finding a pair of wingmen to match the ability of Captain Joe Truskowski of Detroit and Leo Draveling. They are six feet tall, weigh 200 pounds each, and play a smart game at the flanks. Each is a master at snagging passes. Truskowski also is a commendable ball-carrier, while Draveling is one of the team's best punters."

As a senior in 1930, Draveling was moved by Michigan's coach, Harry Kipke, to the right tackle position. He was six feet, two inches tall, weighed 208 pounds at the start of the 1930 football season and was "looked upon as a likely all-American." Due to injuries, Draveling started only four games for the undefeated 1930 Michigan team that tied for the Big Ten Conference championship. Despite limited playing time, Draveling was selected as a first-team All-Big Ten player by sports writer Hank Casserly, and as a third-team All-Big Ten player by the United Press.

Draveling also competed for Michigan as a collegiate wrestler in the heavyweight class. He participated in the second NCAA wrestling championship held at Columbus, Ohio, in March 1929. Draveling finished in top four in his weight class, losing a semifinal match to Fairall, Ohio State's best wrestler, in 8 minutes, 45 seconds.

== Coaching career, professional football, and later life ==
After graduating from Michigan, Draveling was appointed, in 1931, as athletic director at Akron High School in Akron, New York. He also coached Akron's football team. In 1932, he was the line coach for the football team at Canisius College—now known as Canisius University—in Buffalo, New York. Draveling played one year of professional football, in 1933, for the Cincinnati Reds of the National Football League (NFL). He played in nine NFL games for the Reds as a tackle. In 1934, he was hired as head football coach at the Detroit Institute of Technology. He also taught science at the school. After two seasons at Detroit Tech, he was succeeded by Hal Shields.

Draveling died of a heart attack, at age 48, on July 2, 1955, at his home in Columbus Township, Michigan. He was buried at Lakeside Cemetery in Port Huron. In 2003, Draveling was inducted into the Port Huron Sports Hall of Fame.

== Head coaching record ==
=== College ===
Year	Team	Overall	Conference	Standing	Bowl/playoffs
Detroit Tech Dynamics (Independent) (1934–1935)
1934	Detroit Tech	0–5			
1935	Detroit Tech	1–8			
Detroit Tech:		1–13			
Total:		1–13			
