= Dallas Marvil =

American football player and coach (1910–1977)

- "Captain Marvil" from the 1933 "Syllabus"

Profile
- Position: Tackle

Personal information
- Born: October 24, 1910; Laurel, Delaware, U.S.
- Died: March 12, 1977 (aged 66); Broward County, Florida, U.S.

Career information
- College: Northwestern University

Career history
- 1929–1931: Northwestern

Awards and highlights
- Consensus All-American (1931); Second-team All-American (1930); First-team All-Big Ten (1931); Second-team All-Big Ten (1930)

Joshua Dallas "Dal" Marvil (October 24, 1910 – March 12, 1977) was an American football player and coach. He played at the tackle position for the Northwestern Wildcats football team and was a consensus first-team All-American in 1931. He played for three Big Ten Conference championship teams at Northwestern University, two in football (1930, 1931) and one in basketball (1930–31). He also served as an assistant football coach at the University of San Francisco.

== Early life ==
Marvil was raised in Laurel, Delaware. He played basketball and was a "weight man" for the track team at Laurel High School.

== Northwestern ==
Marvil played college football at the tackle position for Northwestern University. In 1930, he helped lead the Wildcats football team to a Big Ten Conference championship and was selected by the Associated Press as a second-team All-Western player. In 1931, he was selected as the team captain, led the Wildcats to their second consecutive Big Ten championship, and was a consensus first-team member of the 1931 College Football All-America Team. Marvil was six feet, three inches, and weighed 233 pounds while playing football at Northwestern.

Marvil was a member of Beta Theta Pi and also played basketball at Northwestern. Despite his size, weighing 254 pounds in December 1929, he reportedly "handle[d] his bulk well" on the basketball court. Northwestern's 1931 basketball team won the Big Ten championship and compiled a record of 16-1. The Chicago Daily Tribune in October 1931 commented on Marvil's weight: "Dal's chassis is of such a roly poly nature that it is very deceptive to his opponents. He has proved conclusively that a boy who looks blubbery may have plenty of muscle and sinew concealed about him."

== Later years and legacy ==
In February 1932, Marvil was hired to serve during the 1933 season as the head line coach for the University of San Francisco football team. In April 1933, he became engaged to Dorothy Florence Ames of LaGrange, Illinois, who he met while attending Northwestern. As of 1946, he was the president of the "N Men's club."

Marvil died in Broward County, Florida, on March 12, 1977, at the age of 66.

In 1978, he was inducted into the Delaware Sports Hall of Fame.
