= Jim MacMurdo =

American football player (1909–1981)

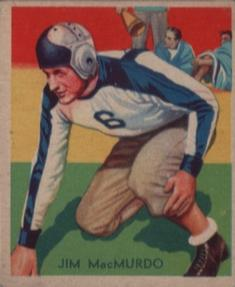

Profile
- Position: Tackle

Personal information
- Born: September 2, 1909; Ellwood City, Pennsylvania, U.S.
- Died: August 11, 1981 (aged 71); Darby, Pennsylvania, U.S.

Career information
- High school: Ellwood City; The Kiski School
- College: Pittsburgh

Career history
- 1932–1933: Boston Braves/Redskins
- 1934–1937: Philadelphia Eagles

Awards and highlights
- Second-team All-American (1931)

James Edward MacMurdo (September 2, 1909 – August 11, 1981) was an American football tackle in the National Football League (NFL) for the Boston Braves/Redskins and Philadelphia Eagles. He played college football at the University of Pittsburgh.
