= 1930 Minnesota Golden Gophers football team =

American college football season

1930 Minnesota Golden Gophers football
- Conference: Big Ten Conference
- Record: 3–4–1 (1–3 Big Ten)
- Head coach: Fritz Crisler (1st season)
- MVP: Biggie Munn
- Captain: Win Brockmeyer
- Home stadium: Memorial Stadium

1930 Big Ten Conference football standings
	Conf.					Overall
Team	W		L		T	W		L		T
No. 5 Michigan +	5	–	0	–	0	8	–	0	–	1
No. 4 Northwestern +	5	–	0	–	0	7	–	1	–	0
Purdue	4	–	2	–	0	6	–	2	–	0
Wisconsin	2	–	2	–	1	6	–	2	–	1
Ohio State	2	–	2	–	1	5	–	2	–	1
Minnesota	1	–	3	–	0	3	–	4	–	1
Indiana	1	–	3	–	0	2	–	5	–	1
Illinois	1	–	4	–	0	3	–	5	–	0
Iowa	0	–	1	–	0	4	–	4	–	0
Chicago	0	–	4	–	0	2	–	5	–	2
+ – Conference co-champions; Rankings from Dickinson System

The 1930 Minnesota Golden Gophers football team represented the University of Minnesota in the 1930 college football season. In their first year under head coach Fritz Crisler, the Golden Gophers compiled a 3–4–1 record, shut out four opponents (including a scoreless tie with Stanford), and outscored all opponents by a combined score of 126 to 81. Out of 126 points scored by the Golden Gophers, most were scored in two games against schools from South Dakota who the Golden Gophers defeated by a combined score of 107 to 0.

Guard Biggie Munn was selected as the team's Most Valuable Player. Munn was also selected by the United Press as a first-team player on the 1930 All-Big Ten Conference football team.

Total attendance for the season was 167,728, which averaged to 27,955. The season high for attendance was against Northwestern.

== Schedule ==
Date	Opponent	Site	Result	Attendance	Source
September 27	South Dakota State*	Memorial Stadium; Minneapolis, MN	W 48–0	20,000	
October 4	Vanderbilt*	Memorial Stadium; Minneapolis, MN	L 7–33	20,000	
October 11	Stanford*	Memorial Stadium; Minneapolis, MN	T 0–0	45,000	
October 18	Indiana	Memorial Stadium; Minneapolis, MN	W 6–0	20,000	
November 1	Northwestern	Memorial Stadium; Minneapolis, MN	L 6–27	54,000	
November 8	South Dakota*	Memorial Stadium; Minneapolis, MN	W 59–0	20,000	
November 15	at Michigan	Michigan Stadium; Ann Arbor, MI (Little Brown Jug)	L 0–7	54,944	
November 22	at Wisconsin	Camp Randall Stadium; Madison, WI (rivalry)	L 0–14	32,000	
*Non-conference game

== Game summaries ==
=== Michigan ===
	1	2	3	4	Total
Gophers	0	0	0	0	0
Wolverines	7	0	0	0	7

In the seventh week of the season, Minnesota played Michigan in the annual competition for the Little Brown Jug. The game marked the first appearance by Fritz Crisler as a head coach at Michigan Stadium. Crisler was in his first year as head coach at Minnesota; he took over as Michigan's head coach eight years later. Michigan won the game 7 to 0. The game's only score came in the first quarter on a 45-yard punt return by Michigan's left halfback, Jack Wheeler. The return was off of a punt by Minnesota's All-American Biggie Munn. A newspaper account of the game described Wheeler's run as follows:

"Wheeler's run will go down as one of Michigan's, classics. He got the ball after a low, twisting kick by Munn had traveled to the Minnesota 45-yard line. Wheeler gathered it in and charged. He hit two Minnesota tacklers and knifed his way between them. He staggered a yard or two from the impact and sidestepped another Gopher tackler. Morrison came across like a charging bull to take another from Wheeler's path. He waved away, and slid yards across the goal line on his dive for a touchdown."

Despite the lack of scoring, the Associated Press reported that the game was "a desperately-fought breath-taking football battle."
