= Fred Felber =

American football player (1909–1978)

Profile
- Position: Offensive tackle

Personal information
- Born: March 25, 1909; Le Sueur, Minnesota, U.S.
- Died: May 1978 (age 69)

Career information
- College: North Dakota

Career history
- 1932: Boston Braves
- 1933: Philadelphia Eagles

Awards and highlights
- Third-team All-American (1931)

"Nip" Frederick Emmett Felber (March 25, 1909 – May 1978) was an American football offensive tackle in the National Football League (NFL) for the Boston Braves and the Philadelphia Eagles. He played college football at the University of North Dakota.
