= Walla Walla High School =

Location
- 800 Abbott Street; Walla Walla, Washington 99362; United States; 46°02′39″N 118°19′02″W

Information
- Type: Public
- Motto: Intellectually, socially, personally transformative for all.
- Established: 1889
- School district: Walla Walla School District (#140)
- Superintendent: Wade Smith
- Principal: John Schumacher
- Grades: 9–12
- Enrollment: 1,586 (2023–2024)
- Campus: Suburban
- Campus size: 60 acres (24 ha)
- Colors: Blue & White
- Mascot: Blue Devils
- Nickname: Wa-Hi
- Information: 509-527-3020
- Website: WaHiBlueDevils.org

Walla Walla High School (commonly Wa-Hi) is a public high school in Walla Walla, Washington that is the largest school in the Walla Walla Public School System.

Located in Walla Walla East, the sprawling 60-acre campus features detached buildings and an open layout. The school, originally established in 1889 along with Washington's statehood, did not move to its current location until 1963. The original school occupied the Baker School building and had a student body of 12. Walla Walla High School would go on to occupy the Paine School building in 1890. By the early 1900s, the student body population had reached about 260, and the first real high school building was erected in 1904. By 1917, the school was so overpopulated that shacks furnished with church pews were being utilized as classrooms. Students led a campaign for an addition to be built onto Wa-Hi, and they were successful. By 1936, a new gym was complete. The old gymnasium was reutilized as the industrial arts building, art, music, and shop departments. The vocational building was completed in 1948 and currently is the home to agricultural classes, primarily. The automotive mechanics shop was built in 1952.

The Blue Devil mascot can be dated back to about 1923 when the Junior Varsity basketball team was nicknamed the Blue Devils. The Varsity team had jerseys adorned with Walla Walla's initials, a simple "WW". However, by the following school year, the Blue Devil mascot had been adopted by the Varsity team as well. While the school's original colors were purple and gold, the school colors were changed to blue and white in 1904, leading to the birth of the Blue Devil nickname. In a community poll taken in 2023, The mascot was given the name Dante in reference to Dante's Inferno.

Walla Walla High School is a comprehensive public high school (operating on a semester schedule) Priding itself on serving the needs of a diverse student body through programs including Advanced Placement, College in the High School, Career and Technical Education, Running Start, University Enrichment Programs, and AVID, Wa-Hi offers a complete array of positive learning opportunities to its students. In addition to these programs, there are numerous student clubs and athletic teams.

Walla Walla High School is continually recognized for its achievements in education, self-proclaiming as one of the premier high schools of Southeastern Washington. Recent accolades awarded to the establishment include: Washington Achievement Award 2010 - Closing the Achievement Gap, Washington Achievement Award 2011 & 2012 - Extended Graduation Rate, US News & World Report 2013 - Silver Medal, Washington Achievement Award 2013 - High Progress, Washington Achievement Award 2014 - High Progress, US News & World Report 2014 - Silver Medal, US News & World Report 2015 - Silver Medal, 8th Annual AP District Honor Roll –2017, US News & World Report 2019 - Silver Medal, US News & World Report 2023-2024 - Best High School Rankin.

Important Numbers as of 2023: Enrollment: 1646 (9-12) Number of Teaching Faculty: 84 Number of Counselors: 5 Senior Class Size: 401

Student Diversity: Approx. 53.9% White, 39.9% Hispanic

== Sports ==
Walla Walla competes in WIAA Class 3A, and is a member of the Mid-Columbia Conference in District Eight.

=== State championships ===
- Baseball: 1988
- Boys basketball: 1923, 1924, 1934, 1937, 1952, 1999
- Girls basketball: 1979, 1984
- Girls cross country: 1983
- Boys golf: 1998
- Fastpitch softball: 2011
- Boys track and field: 1941, 1953, 2019
- Girls track and field: 1970, 2024
- Boys wrestling: 1984

== Notable alumni ==
- Drew Bledsoe, NFL quarterback, class of 1990
- Tony Criscola, professional baseball player
- Dean Derby, professional football player, class of 1953
- Harry Ebding, professional football player
- Eric O'Flaherty, professional baseball player
- Peter Sirmon, professional football player and coach
- Lowell Ward Rooks (1893−1973), American army officer
- Adam West, actor, most famous for portraying Batman
