= 1930 All-Pacific Coast football team =

American all-star college football team

The 1930 All-Pacific Coast football team consists of American football players chosen by various organizations for All-Pacific Coast teams for the 1930 college football season. The organizations selecting teams in 1934 included the Associated Press (AP), the Newspaper Enterprise Association, and the United Press (UP).

== All-Pacific Coast selections ==
=== Quarterback ===
- Marshall Duffield, USC (AP-1; NEA-1; UP-1)
- Orville Mohler, USC (UP-2)

=== Halfbacks ===
- Erny Pinckert, USC (AP-1; UP-1) (College Football Hall of Fame)
- Johnny Kitzmiller, Oregon (AP-1; NEA-1; UP-1) (College Football Hall of Fame)
- Fred Stennett, St. Mary's (UP-2)
- Carl Ellingsen, Washington State (UP-2)

=== Fullback ===
- Elmer Schwartz, Washington State (AP-1; NEA-1; UP-1)
- Harlow Rothert, Stanford (UP-2)

=== Ends ===
- Garrett Arbelbide, USC (AP-1;NEA-1; UP-1)
- Harry Ebding, St. Mary's (AP-1; UP-1)
- Bill McKalip, Oregon State (NEA-1; UP-2)
- Lyle Maskell, Washington State (UP-2)

=== Tackles ===
- Turk Edwards, Washington State (AP-1; NEA-1; UP-1)
- Paul Schwegler, Washington (AP-1; NEA-1; UP-1) (College Football Hall of Fame)
- Hall, USC (UP-2)
- George Christensen, Oregon (UP-2)

=== Guards ===
- Johnny Baker, USC (AP-1; NEA-1; UP-1) (College Football Hall of Fame)
- Ted Beckett, California (AP-1; NEA-1; UP-1)
- Austin Colbert, Oregon (UP-2)
- Jack Parodi, Washington State (UP-2)

=== Centers ===
- Mel Hein, Washington State (AP-1; NEA-1; UP-1) (College and Pro Football Halls of Fame)
- Al Tassi, Santa Clara (UP-2)

== Key ==
AP = Associated Press, selected "after the most comprehensive balloting ever taken on a mythical eleven in the Far West"

NEA = Newspaper Enterprise Association, "selected by NEA newspaper sports writers all over the Pacific conference territory"

UP = United Press, "picked by sports editors and writers on metropolitan newspapers from every section represented by contending talent"

Bold = Consensus first-team selection by at least two of the AP, NEA and UP

== See also ==
- 1930 College Football All-America Team
