= 1930 Iowa Hawkeyes football team =

American college football season

1930 Iowa Hawkeyes football
- Conference: Big Ten Conference
- Record: 4–4 (0–1 Big Ten)
- Head coach: Burt Ingwersen (7th season)
- MVP: Oliver Sansen
- Captain: Grover Hidgon
- Home stadium: Iowa Stadium

1930 Big Ten Conference football standings
	Conf.					Overall
Team	W		L		T	W		L		T
No. 5 Michigan +	5	–	0	–	0	8	–	0	–	1
No. 4 Northwestern +	5	–	0	–	0	7	–	1	–	0
Purdue	4	–	2	–	0	6	–	2	–	0
Wisconsin	2	–	2	–	1	6	–	2	–	1
Ohio State	2	–	2	–	1	5	–	2	–	1
Minnesota	1	–	3	–	0	3	–	4	–	1
Indiana	1	–	3	–	0	2	–	5	–	1
Illinois	1	–	4	–	0	3	–	5	–	0
Iowa	0	–	1	–	0	4	–	4	–	0
Chicago	0	–	4	–	0	2	–	5	–	2
+ – Conference co-champions; Rankings from Dickinson System

The 1930 Iowa Hawkeyes football team was an American football team represented the University of Iowa as a member of the Big Ten Conference during the 1930 Big Ten football season. In their sixth year under head coach Burt Ingwersen, the Hawkeyes compiled a 4–4 record (0–1 in conference games) and outscored all opponents by a total of 88 to 74. Iowa played only one conference game during the 1930 season as they were banned from the Big Ten Conference in January 1930 during the time the conference scheduled football games, before being reinstated in February.

Iowa played its home games in Iowa Stadium (later renamed Kinnick Stadium) in Iowa City, Iowa.

== Schedule ==
Date	Opponent	Site	Result	Attendance	Source
September 27	Bradley Tech*	Iowa Stadium; Iowa City, IA	W 38–12		
October 4	Oklahoma A&M*	Iowa Stadium; Iowa City, IA	L 0–6		
October 11	Centenary*	Iowa Stadium; Iowa City, IA	L 12–19		
October 18	Purdue	Iowa Stadium; Iowa City, IA	L 0–20	18,000	
November 1	at Detroit*	University of Detroit Stadium; Detroit, MI	W 7–3		
November 8	at Marquette*	Marquette Stadium; Milwaukee, WI	L 0–7	17,000	
November 15	Penn State*^{†}	Iowa Stadium; Iowa City, IA	W 19–0	20,000	
November 22	Nebraska*	Iowa Stadium; Iowa City, IA (rivalry)	W 12–7	12,000	
*Non-conference game; ^{†}Homecoming
