= Tommy Yarr =

American football player and coach (1908–1941)

- Yarr, c. 1931

Profile
- Position: Center

Personal information
- Born: December 4, 1908; Dabob, Washington, U.S.
- Died: December 24, 1941 (aged 33); Chicago, Illinois, U.S.
- Listed height: 5 ft 10 in (1.78 m)
- Listed weight: 205 lb (93 kg)

Career information
- College: Notre Dame

Career history

Playing
- Chicago Cardinals (1933)

Coaching
- John Carroll (1934–1935) (Head coach)

Awards and highlights
- Consensus All-American (1931)
- Stats at Pro Football Reference
- College Football Hall of Fame

Thomas Cornelius Yarr (December 4, 1908 – December 24, 1941) was an American football player and coach. He played college football as a center at the University of Notre Dame, where was captain of the 1931 Notre Dame Fighting Irish football team and a consensus section to the 1931 College Football All-America Team. He then professionally for one season, in 1933, for the Chicago Cardinals of the National Football League (NFL). Yarr served as the head football coach at John Carroll University in University Heights, Ohio from 1934 to 1935, compiling a record of 6–10–2. He was inducted into the College Football Hall of Fame as a player in 1987.

Yarr was Native American of Snohomish descent. He died of a heart attack in Chicago in 1941.

== Head coaching record ==
Year	Team	Overall	Conference	Standing	Bowl/playoffs
John Carroll Blue Streaks (Ohio Athletic Conference) (1934–1935)
1934	John Carroll	5–2–2	1–1–2	11th	
1935	John Carroll	1–8	0–4	21st	
John Carroll:		6–10–2	1–5–2		
Total:		31–23–11			
