= Leo Jensvold =

American football player (1908–1966)

No. 10
- Positions: Quarterback, halfback

Personal information
- Born: May 29, 1908; Emmetsburg, Iowa, U.S.
- Died: May 30, 1966 (aged 58); Emmetsburg, Iowa, U.S.
- Listed height: 5 ft 8 in (1.73 m)
- Listed weight: 173 lb (78 kg)

Career information
- High school: Emmetsburg (IA)
- College: Iowa

Career history
- Chicago Bears (1931); Cleveland Indians (1931)

Awards and highlights
- All-Big Ten (1930)

Career NFL statistics
- Games played: 7–8
- Games started: 4
- Stats at Pro Football Reference

Leo Boyd Jensvold (May 29, 1908 – May 30, 1966) was an American football quarterback and halfback who played one season in the National Football League (NFL). He played in one game for the Chicago Bears before joining the Cleveland Indians and finishing the season with them. He played college football at Iowa and played alongside his twin brother, Lloyd.

== Early life and education ==
Leo Jensvold was born on May 29, 1908, in Emmetsburg, Iowa. (Note: Pro-Football-Reference lists his birth date to be March 29) He went to Emmetsburg High School before attending University of Iowa. At Emmetsburg High, he and his brother only lost three games, and won the 1926 State Championship. He also was named All-State in 1925 and '26. He is one of three Emmetsburg High School attendees to play professionally. While at Iowa, he was considered a "star" halfback and quarterback for their football team, the Hawkeyes. He won letters, and played there from 1928 to 1930. He played with his twin brother, Lloyd Jensvold. Leo was one of the top players on the team, being involved in almost every play. In 1930, he and Lloyd both started the season at quarterback, but then Leo was moved to halfback and eventually became the team's leading rusher. His final college game was a charity All-Star game with the Midwest All-Stars against the Southern All-Stars. Under coach Bob Zuppke, the Midwest lost, 18 to 0. Jensvold was described as "almost the entire mid-west offense, his passes and fierce plunges accounting for virtually all of his team's gains." Jensvold was also named All-Big Ten.

== Professional career ==
On August 27, 1931, Jensvold was signed by the Chicago Bears of the National Football League (NFL). He played in week one against his future team, the Cleveland Indians. He wore number 10. In week two, he was scheduled to play against the Green Bay Packers, but joined the Indians instead. He joined them along with former Iowa teammate Carl Pignatelli. With the Indians he would play in between 6 and 7 games, starting 4. He did not play a second season as the Indians folded from the league.

== Later life and death ==
After his professional career he worked as the secretary and treasurer of the Emmetsburg Production Credit Association. He also served in World War II. On May 30, 1966, he drowned in Emmetsburg after his boat capsized in Five Island Lake. It was only one day after his 58th birthday.
