= Pug Rentner =

American football player (1910–1978)

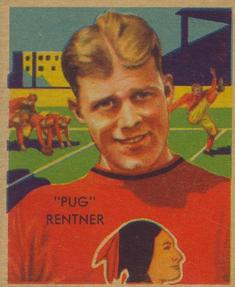

No. 31, 7
- Positions: Halfback, quarterback

Personal information
- Born: September 18, 1910; Joliet, Illinois, U.S.
- Died: August 24, 1978 (aged 67); Glencoe, Illinois, U.S.
- Listed height: 6 ft 1 in (1.85 m)
- Listed weight: 187 lb (85 kg)

Career information
- College: Northwestern

Career history
- 1934–1936: Boston Redskins
- 1937: Chicago Bears

Awards and highlights
- Consensus All-American (1931); 2× First-team All-Big Ten (1930, 1931)
- College Football Hall of Fame

Ernest John "Pug" Rentner (September 18, 1910 – August 24, 1978) was an American football halfback and quarterback who played professionally in the National Football League (NFL) for the Boston Redskins and the Chicago Bears. He played college football for the Northwestern Wildcats.

== Early life ==
Rentner attended the Farragut School in Joliet, Illinois.

== College career ==
Rentner played college football at Northwestern University and was chosen to the 1931 College Football All-America Team. He was selected as Northwestern's Most Valuable Player in 1932. He was inducted into the College Football Hall of Fame in 1979.
