= Frank Baker (American football) =

American football player (1909–1985)

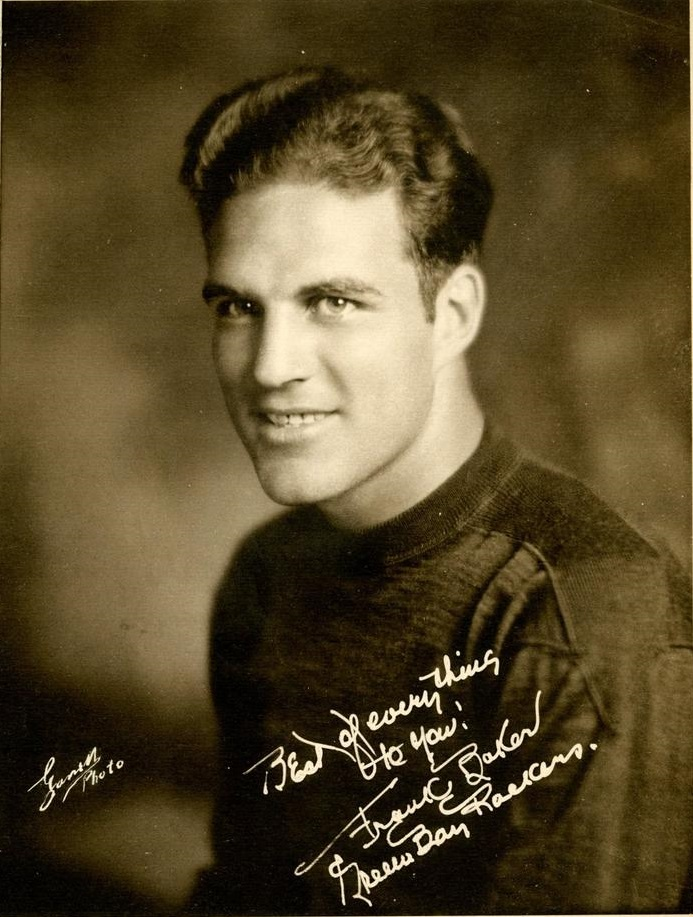

No. 12
- Position: End

Personal information
- Born: July 23, 1909; Madison, Wisconsin, U.S.
- Died: September 14, 1985 (aged 76); Solano County, California, U.S.
- Listed height: 6 ft 2 in (1.88 m)
- Listed weight: 182 lb (83 kg)

Career information
- High school: Washington (Cedar Rapids, Iowa)
- College: Northwestern

Career history
- Green Bay Packers (1931)

Awards and highlights
- NFL champion (1931); Consensus All-American (1930); Second-team All-American (1929); First-team All-Big Ten (1930); Second-team All-Big Ten (1929)

Career NFL statistics
- Games played: 2
- Games started: 2
- Receiving touchdowns: 1
- Stats at Pro Football Reference

Frank Louis Baker (July 23, 1909 – September 14, 1985) was an American football end for the Green Bay Packers of the National Football League (NFL). He played college football for Northwestern where he was an All-American in 1930. He won an NFL championship in 1931.

== Biography ==
Baker was born on July 23, 1909, in Madison, Wisconsin.

== Career ==
Baker played with the Green Bay Packers during the 1931 NFL season. He played at the collegiate level at Northwestern University.
