= 1930 Illinois Fighting Illini football team =

American college football season

1930 Illinois Fighting Illini football
- Conference: Big Ten Conference
- Record: 3–5 (1–4 Big Ten)
- Head coach: Robert Zuppke (18th season)
- MVP: Stan Bodman
- Captain: Olaf E. Robinson
- Home stadium: Memorial Stadium

Uniform
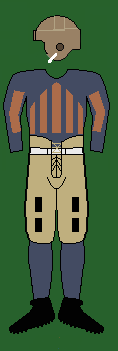

1930 Big Ten Conference football standings
	Conf.					Overall
Team	W		L		T	W		L		T
No. 5 Michigan +	5	–	0	–	0	8	–	0	–	1
No. 4 Northwestern +	5	–	0	–	0	7	–	1	–	0
Purdue	4	–	2	–	0	6	–	2	–	0
Wisconsin	2	–	2	–	1	6	–	2	–	1
Ohio State	2	–	2	–	1	5	–	2	–	1
Minnesota	1	–	3	–	0	3	–	4	–	1
Indiana	1	–	3	–	0	2	–	5	–	1
Illinois	1	–	4	–	0	3	–	5	–	0
Iowa	0	–	1	–	0	4	–	4	–	0
Chicago	0	–	4	–	0	2	–	5	–	2
+ – Conference co-champions; Rankings from Dickinson System

The 1930 Illinois Fighting Illini football team was an American football team that represented the University of Illinois during the 1930 college football season. In their 18th season under head coach Robert Zuppke, the Illini compiled a 3–5 record and finished in eighth place in the Big Ten Conference. Guard Stan Bodman was selected as the team's most valuable player. Fullback Olaf E. Robinson was the team captain.

== Schedule ==
Date	Opponent	Site	Result	Attendance	Source
October 4	Iowa State*	Memorial Stadium; Champaign, IL	W 7–0	32,718	
October 11	Butler*	Memorial Stadium; Champaign, IL	W 27–0	8,371	
October 18	Northwestern	Memorial Stadium; Champaign, IL (rivalry)	L 0–32	52,687	
October 25	at Michigan	Michigan Stadium; Ann Arbor, MI (rivalry)	L 7–15	63,176	
November 1	Purdue	Memorial Stadium; Champaign, IL (rivalry)	L 0–25	26,549	
November 8	vs. Army*	Yankee Stadium; Bronx, NY	L 0–13	68,186	
November 15	at Chicago	Stagg Field; Chicago, IL	W 28–0	18,500	
November 22	Ohio State	Memorial Stadium; Champaign, IL (Illibuck)	L 9–12	16,881	
*Non-conference game
