= Milo Lubratovich =

American football player (1907–1975)

Profile
- Position: Tackle

Personal information
- Born: May 30, 1907; Indiana Harbor, Indiana, U.S.
- Died: September 5, 1975 (aged 68)
- Listed height: 6 ft 2 in (1.88 m)
- Listed weight: 230 lb (104 kg)

Career information
- High school: Duluth (MN) Central
- College: Wisconsin

Career history
- Brooklyn Dodgers (1931–1935)

Awards and highlights
- Consensus All-American (1930); First-team All-Big Ten (1930)
- Stats at Pro Football Reference

Milo Milan Lubratovich (May 30, 1907 – September 5, 1975), name changed in 1943 to Milo Milan Lubratt, was an American football tackle. He played college football for the University of Wisconsin (1927-1930) and professional football in the National Football League (NFL) for the Brooklyn Dodgers (1931-1935).

Lubratovich was born in 1907 in East Chicago, Indiana. He attended Central High School in Duluth, Minnesota. He then enrolled at the University of Wisconsin where he played for the Wisconsin Badgers football program from 1927 to 1930. He helped lead the 1930 Wisconsin Badgers football team to a 6–2–1 record and was a consensus first-team tackle on the 1930 All-America college football team.

Lubratovich signed with the Brooklyn Dodgers in August 1931 and immediately won a spot as a starter at the tackle position. The Brooklyn Daily Times wrote: "Perhaps the outstanding addition is that of Milo Lubratovich, The University of Wisconsin's great tackle. Weighing 230 pounds, he was fast and powerful, and his ability to get under a kick was uncanny." He played at the tackle position, both on offense and defense, for the Dodgers from 1931 to 1935. He appeared in 53 NFL games, 50 of them as a starter.

Lubratovich served in the army in World War II. He later worked as an engineer for a concrete restoration company. He was inducted in 2008 into the University of Wisconsin Athletic Hall of Fame.
