= Fred Ratterman =

American football player (1912–1988)

Profile
- Positions: Halfback, Quarterback

Personal information
- Born: August 9, 1912; Cincinnati, Ohio
- Died: March 6, 1988 (aged 75); Cincinnati, Ohio

Career information
- College: Michigan

Career history
- 1930, 1933: Michigan
- 1934: Cincinnati

Lawrence Frederick Ratterman (August 9, 1912 – March 6, 1988) was an American football player.

Ratterman attended St. Mary's High School and Withrow High School in Cincinnati, Ohio before enrolling at the University of Michigan. He played halfback and quarterback for the Michigan Wolverines football team in 1930, 1932, and 1933.

Ratterman also played professional football for the Cincinnati Reds for one game during the 1934 NFL season. He was 0-for-3 passing and gained one yard on two carries as a rusher.
