= Sam Willaman =

American football player and coach (1890–1935)

Biographical details
- Born: April 4, 1890; Salem, Ohio, U.S.
- Died: August 18, 1935 (aged 45); Cleveland, Ohio, U.S.

Playing career
- 1911: Ohio State
- 1913: Ohio State
- 1915: Akron Indians
- 1917: Canton Bulldogs
- Positions: End, halfback, fullback

Coaching career (HC unless noted)
- 1915–1921: East Technical HS (OH)
- 1922–1925: Iowa State
- 1926–1928: Ohio State (assistant)
- 1929–1933: Ohio State
- 1934: Western Reserve

Head coaching record
- Overall: 47–26–9 (college)

Samuel Stienneck Willaman (April 4, 1890 – August 18, 1935) was an American football player and coach. He served as the head coach at Iowa State University (1922–1925), Ohio State University (1929–1933), and Western Reserve University (1934), compiling a career college football record of 47–26–9. At Iowa State, Willaman integrated the team by playing Jack Trice.

== Playing career ==
In college, Willaman played for Ohio State at end, halfback, and fullback. He lettered in 1911 and 1913. In 1913, he was named All-Ohio. In 1921, he was selected to the Ohio State football all-time team at second-team halfback behind Chic Harley and Pete Stinchcomb.

While a student at Ohio State, Willaman was a member of the Sigma Pi fraternity. After graduating in 1915, he became a high school football head coach. He had earlier coached at a high school in Alliance, Ohio, and in 1915 he was hired as head coach at Cleveland's East Technical High School. At this time he also began playing halfback for Peggy Parratt's Akron Indians football team. Playing professional football was not forbidden in Willaman's East Tech contract, but playing football for money was frowned upon at the time in academic circles. For this reason, Willaman played professionally under the name "Sam Williams".

In 1917, Willaman joined the Canton Bulldogs, where he played with Jim Thorpe. In Canton, Willaman moved to end, the position where he had started his college playing career. He was also Thorpe's backup at halfback. The Bulldogs finished the season 9–1 and won the championship of the "Ohio League", which was the direct predecessor to the National Football League.

== Coaching career ==
World War I disrupted professional football, and Willaman began focusing primarily on coaching. His success at East Tech caught the attention of colleges.

=== Iowa State ===
In 1922, he took the head coaching position at Iowa State University. Willaman was the 13th head football coach for the Iowa State University Cyclones, and held that position for four seasons, from 1922 until 1925. At the time Willaman came to Iowa State, the school had not had much success in football; they had employed three head coaches in the prior three years. In his first season, Willaman's team finished with a 2–6 record, but posted a winning record in each of the three years that followed. His career coaching record at Iowa state was 14–15–3. This ranks him 18th in total wins and 13th in winning percentage in Iowa State football history.

When Willaman first arrived at Iowa state, he brought with him six of his East Tech players, including an African-American named Jack Trice. Trice was the first African-American player at Iowa State, and one of the first to play college football in that region of the country. Trice suffered a severe injury during a game at the University of Minnesota in 1923, and died from complications. In 1999, Iowa State University's Cyclone Stadium was renamed Jack Trice Stadium in his honor.

=== Ohio State ===
In 1926, Willaman's former coach at Ohio State, John Wilce, invited him to return to his alma mater as an assistant coach. Wilce designated Willaman as his successor. Following the 1928 season, Wilce resigned. Immediately following, Notre Dame's coach Knute Rockne informed Ohio State that he was interested in the position. Rockne was trying to get a better deal at Notre Dame and was using the open Ohio State job as leverage. Willaman waited while Ohio State and Rockne negotiated. Ultimately, Rockne stayed at Notre Dame, and Ohio State hired Willaman.

Willaman posted a 26–10–4 record at Ohio State. The Dunkel College Football Index named Willaman's 1933 Ohio State team as the best that season in the country. Despite his success, Willaman's teams were accused of underperforming. Despite fielding many All-American players, including the legendary Wes Fesler, Ohio State never won a Big Ten Conference title under Willaman. Worse, he held a losing record (2–3) against the Buckeyes' arch rival, Michigan. Yielding to pressure, Willaman resigned after the 1933 season to take the head coaching position at Western Reserve University.

=== Western Reserve ===
Sam Willaman cartoon winning the Big Four Conference in 1934

Willaman coached Western Reserve, present-day Case Western Reserve University, to a 7–1–1 record in 1934, including winning the school's first Cleveland Big Four Conference title with a perfect 3–0 league record. He set up what would be the last matchup between the Ohio State Buckeyes and the Western Reserve Red Cats, which was held at League Park. Western Reserve was also the last Ohio opponent played by Ohio State for nearly six decades, until again in 1992 against Bowling Green. Willaman's coaching career at Western Reserve was tragically cut short, when he died following an emergency operation on August 18, 1935.

== Head coaching record ==
=== College ===
Year	Team	Overall	Conference	Standing	Bowl/playoffs
Iowa State Cyclones (Missouri Valley Intercollegiate Athletic Association) (1922–1925)
1922	Iowa State	2–6	2–4	5th	
1923	Iowa State	4–3–1	3–2–1	4th	
1924	Iowa State	4–3–1	2–3	6th	
1925	Iowa State	4–3–1	3–2–1	T–3rd	
Iowa State:		14–15–3	10–11–2		
Ohio State Buckeyes (Big Ten Conference) (1929–1933)
1929	Ohio State	4–3–1	2–2–1	T–5th	
1930	Ohio State	5–2–1	2–2–1	T–4th	
1931	Ohio State	6–3	4–2	4th	
1932	Ohio State	4–1–3	2–1–2	4th	
1933	Ohio State	7–1	4–1	2nd	
Ohio State:		26–10–4	14–8–4		
Western Reserve Red Cats (Big Four Conference) (1934)
1934	Western Reserve	7–1–1	3–0	1st	
Western Reserve:		7–1–1	3–0		
Total:		47–26–9			
