= 1930 All-Big Ten Conference football team =

American college football all-star team

The 1930 All-Big Ten Conference football team consists of American football players selected to the All-Big Ten Conference teams chosen by various selectors for the 1930 Big Ten Conference football season.

== All Big-Ten selections ==
=== Ends ===
- Frank Baker, Northwestern (AP-1, UP-1, NEA-1, Coaches-1, KR-1)
- Wes Fesler, Ohio State (AP-1, UP-1, NEA-1, Coaches-1, KR-1)
- Paul Moss, Purdue (AP-2, UP-2, NEA-2, Coaches-2)
- Milt Gantenbein, Wisconsin (AP-2, UP-2, NEA-2, Coaches-2)
- Ivy Williamson, Michigan (UP-3)
- Laurence E. Oliphant, Northwestern (UP-3)

=== Tackles ===
- Milo Lubratovich, Wisconsin (AP-1, UP-1, NEA-1, Coaches-1, KR-1)
- George Van Bibber, Purdue (AP-1, UP-1, NEA-1, Coaches-1, KR-1)
- Dallas Marvil, Northwestern (AP-2, UP-2, NEA-2, Coaches-2)
- Stanley L. Bodman, Illinois (AP-2, UP-3, NEA-2)
- Harold Ely, Iowa (UP-2)
- Tom Samuels, Michigan (Coaches-2)
- Leo Draveling, Michigan (UP-3)

=== Guards ===
- Wade Woodworth, Northwestern (AP-1, UP-1, NEA-1 Coaches-1, KR-1)
- Biggie Munn, Minnesota (AP-2, UP-1, NEA-1, Coaches-1)
- Greg Kabat, Wisconsin (AP-1, UP-2, NEA-2, Coaches-2, KR-1)
- George Stears, Purdue (AP-2, UP-2, NEA-2, Coaches-2)
- Samuel Horwitz, Chicago (UP-3)
- Joe Zeller, Indiana (UP-3)

=== Centers ===
- Maynard Morrison, Michigan (AP-1, UP-1, NEA-1, Coaches-1, KR-1)
- Ookie Miller, Purdue (AP-2, UP-2, NEA-2, Coaches-2)
- Robert E. Clark, Northwestern (UP-3)

=== Quarterbacks ===
- Harry Newman, Michigan (AP-1, UP-1, NEA-2, Coaches-1 [hb], KR-1)
- Jack White, Purdue (AP-2, UP-2, NEA-1, Coaches-1)
- Leo Jensvold, Iowa (UP-3)

=== Halfbacks ===
- Lee Hanley, Northwestern (AP-1, UP-1, NEA-1, Coaches-2 [quarterback])
- Eddie Risk, Purdue (AP-1, UP-2, Coaches-1, KR-1)
- Lew Hinchman, Ohio State (UP-1, NEA-2)
- Jack Wheeler, Michigan (AP-2, UP-3, NEA-2)
- Gil Berry, Illinois (AP-2, UP-3, NEA-2, Coaches-2, KR-1)
- Hank Bruder, Northwestern (UP-2, Coaches-2, NEA-2 [fullback])

=== Fullbacks ===
- Lafayette Russell, Northwestern (AP-2, UP-1, NEA-1, KR-1)
- Pug Rentner, Northwestern (AP-1, Coaches-1)
- Jack Manders, Minnesota (UP-2, Coaches-2)
- Roy Horstmann, Purdue (UP-3)

== Key ==
AP = Associated Press, selected by coaches, referees and sports writers

NEA = Newspaper Enterprise Association

UP = United Press

Coaches = selected by vote of nine of ten head coaches in the Big Ten, with the exception of Amos Alonzo Stagg who declined to participate

KR = Knute Rockne

Bold = Consensus first-team selection of both the AP and UP

== See also ==
- 1930 College Football All-America Team
