= Wade Woodworth =

American football player and coach (1905–1992)

- Woodworth pictured in The Cincinnatian 1938, Cincinnati yearbook

Biographical details
- Born: August 23, 1905; Providence, Rhode Island, U.S.
- Died: June 29, 1992 (aged 86); Volusia County, Florida, U.S.

Playing career
- 1928–1930: Northwestern
- Position: Guard

Coaching career (HC unless noted)
- 1931–1932: Cincinnati (line)
- 1933–1934: Morgan Park HS (IL)
- 1937: Cincinnati (line)
- 1937: Cincinnati

Head coaching record
- Overall: 0–5 (college)

Accomplishments and honors

Awards
- First-team All-American (1930); First-team All-Big Ten (1930)

Wade Stowell "Red" Woodworth (August 23, 1905 – June 29, 1992) was an American football player and coach. He served as the head football coach at the University of Cincinnati for the final five games of the 1937 season.

Woodworth played college football at Northwestern University as a guard. On May 9, 1931, he won the fourth annual Albany to New York water marathon, an outboard motor race. Woodworth signed a contract with the Green Bay Packers of the National Football League (NFL) to play professional football, but withdrew from the agreement to begin his coaching career an assistant coach at Cincinnati in the fall of 1931. Woodworth owned a midget car racing stable and was in the fish transportation business before returning to Cincinnati as line coach in 1937.

== Head coaching record ==
=== College ===
Year	Team	Overall	Conference	Standing	Bowl/playoffs
Cincinnati Bearcats (Buckeye Athletic Association) (1937)
1937	Cincinnati	0–5	0–4	6th	
Cincinnati:		0–5	0–4		
Total:		0–5			
