= Milt Gantenbein =

American football player (1910–1988)

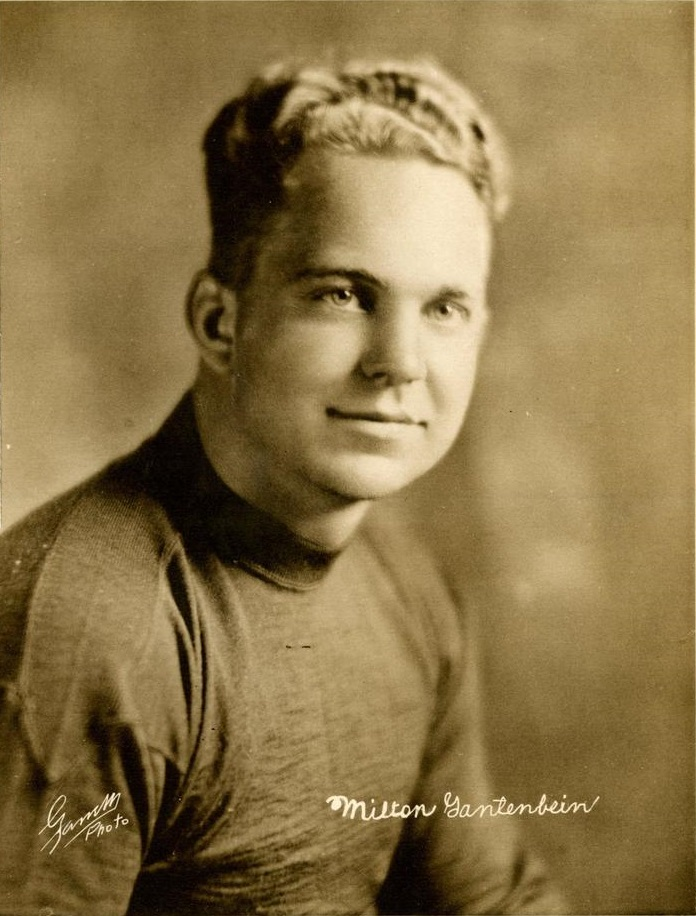

No. 22
- Position: End / Defensive end

Personal information
- Born: May 31, 1910; New Albin, Iowa, U.S.
- Died: December 18, 1988 (aged 78); Carmichael, California, U.S.
- Listed height: 6 ft 0 in (1.83 m)
- Listed weight: 199 lb (90 kg)

Career information
- High school: La Crosse (WI)
- College: Wisconsin

Career history
- Green Bay Packers (1931–1940)

Awards and highlights
- 3× NFL champion (1931, 1936, 1939); Green Bay Packers Hall of Fame; 2× Second-team All-Big Ten (1929, 1930)

Career statistics
- Games played: 103
- starts: 71
- Yards receiving: 1,299
- Touchdowns: 8
- Stats at Pro Football Reference

Milton Edward Gantenbein (May 31, 1910 – December 18, 1988) was an American football player who played on three championship teams, as an end and as a defensive end for the Green Bay Packers from 1931 to 1940.

== Biography ==
Milt Gantenbein was born May 31, 1910, in New Albin, Iowa.

The former University of Wisconsin–Madison standout was a member of three National Football League (NFL) championship teams under head coach Curly Lambeau. In 1931, his rookie year, the sure-handed Gantenbein was the perfect complement to deep-threat Laverne Dilweg in Lambeau's pass-oriented offense and was a solid addition at defensive end. Green Bay's defense limited opponents to 87 points and had five shutouts, while the Packer offense compiled 291 points in fashioning a 12-2 record and winning a third league championship title in the 1931 NFL season. Gantenbein continued as a two-way starter for the next three seasons, playing in the shadow of Dilweg and Johnny Blood.

In the 1936 NFL season, Don Hutson and Gantenbein were the main targets in the Packers' record-setting passing attack, with 34 and 15 catches respectively. The duo was also instrumental in Green Bay's 21-6 victory over the Boston Redskins in the 1936 NFL Championship Game . Gantenbein iced the game with an 8-yard touchdown reception from Arnie Herber in the third quarter.

Gantenbein was named a team captain for the 1937 squad, and he again was a stalwart in the defensive line and the team's second leading receiver with 12 catches for 237 yards (19.8 yard average) and two touchdowns. In the 1937 NFL season, Green Bay slipped to 7–4. In the 1938 NFL season, the team had an 8-3 record and made it to the 1938 NFL Championship Game, where the Packers lost 23–17 to the Giants in New York.

In the 1939 NFL season, the Green Bay Packers struggled at times but posted a 9–2 record to gain a rematch with the New York Giants for the league title in the 1939 NFL Championship Game. This time the game was played on Wisconsin soil, and Gantenbein opened the scoring with a 7-yard touchdown reception from Arnie Herber. It would be all the points the Packers needed on a cold and windy afternoon at Wisconsin State Fair Park in Milwaukee, as they crushed the Giants, 27–0.

He was inducted into the Packers Hall of Fame in 1972 and finished his career with three NFL championships, 77 receptions, 1,299 yards and eight touchdowns. Milt played in 103 regular-season games as a Packer and was inducted into the Green Bay Packers Hall of Fame in 1972.

With his playing days behind him, Gantenbein went on to coach football at Manhattan College in New York for several years.
