= 1930 Indiana Hoosiers football team =

American college football season

1930 Indiana Hoosiers football
- Conference: Big Ten Conference
- Record: 2–5–1 (1–3 Big Ten)
- Head coach: Harlan Page (5th season)
- MVP: Joe Zeller
- Captain: Paul G. Jasper
- Home stadium: Memorial Stadium

1930 Big Ten Conference football standings
	Conf.					Overall
Team	W		L		T	W		L		T
No. 5 Michigan +	5	–	0	–	0	8	–	0	–	1
No. 4 Northwestern +	5	–	0	–	0	7	–	1	–	0
Purdue	4	–	2	–	0	6	–	2	–	0
Wisconsin	2	–	2	–	1	6	–	2	–	1
Ohio State	2	–	2	–	1	5	–	2	–	1
Minnesota	1	–	3	–	0	3	–	4	–	1
Indiana	1	–	3	–	0	2	–	5	–	1
Illinois	1	–	4	–	0	3	–	5	–	0
Iowa	0	–	1	–	0	4	–	4	–	0
Chicago	0	–	4	–	0	2	–	5	–	2
+ – Conference co-champions; Rankings from Dickinson System

The 1930 Indiana Hoosiers football team represented Indiana University as a member the Big Ten Conference during the 1930 college football season. Led by fifth-year head coach Harlan Page, the Hoosiers compiled an overall record of 2–5–1, with a mark of 1–3 in conference play, placing seventh. The Hoosiers played their home games at Memorial Stadium in Bloomington, Indiana.

== Schedule ==
Date	Opponent	Site	Result	Attendance	Source
September 27	Miami (OH)*	Memorial Stadium; Bloomington, IN	W 14–0		
October 4	at Ohio State	Ohio Stadium; Columbus, OH	L 0–23	24,716	
October 11	Oklahoma A&M*	Memorial Stadium; Bloomington, IN	T 7–7		
October 18	at Minnesota	Memorial Stadium; Minneapolis, MN	L 0–6	20,000	
October 25	at SMU	Fair Park Stadium; Dallas, TX	L 0–27	25,000	
November 1	at Notre Dame*	Notre Dame Stadium; Notre Dame, IN	L 0–27	15,000	
November 8	Northwestern	Memorial Stadium; Bloomington, IN	L 0–25	15,000	
November 22	at Purdue	Ross–Ade Stadium; West Lafayette, IN (Old Oaken Bucket)	W 7–6	20,000	
*Non-conference game
