= 1930 Chicago Maroons football team =

American college football season

1930 Chicago Maroons football
- Conference: Big Ten Conference
- Record: 2–5–2 (0–4 Big Ten)
- Head coach: Amos Alonzo Stagg (39th season)
- Home stadium: Stagg Field

1930 Big Ten Conference football standings
	Conf.					Overall
Team	W		L		T	W		L		T
No. 5 Michigan +	5	–	0	–	0	8	–	0	–	1
No. 4 Northwestern +	5	–	0	–	0	7	–	1	–	0
Purdue	4	–	2	–	0	6	–	2	–	0
Wisconsin	2	–	2	–	1	6	–	2	–	1
Ohio State	2	–	2	–	1	5	–	2	–	1
Minnesota	1	–	3	–	0	3	–	4	–	1
Indiana	1	–	3	–	0	2	–	5	–	1
Illinois	1	–	4	–	0	3	–	5	–	0
Iowa	0	–	1	–	0	4	–	4	–	0
Chicago	0	–	4	–	0	2	–	5	–	2
+ – Conference co-champions; Rankings from Dickinson System

The 1930 Chicago Maroons football team was an American football team that represented the University of Chicago during the 1930 college football season. In their 39th season under head coach Amos Alonzo Stagg, the Maroons compiled a 2–5–2 record, finished in last place in the Big Ten Conference, and were outscored by their opponents by a combined total of 129 to 33.

== Schedule ==
Date	Time	Opponent	Site	Result	Attendance	Source
October 4	1:45 p.m.	Ripon*	Stagg Field; Chicago, IL	W 19–0	20,000	
October 4		Hillsdale*	Stagg Field; Chicago, IL	W 7–6	20,000	
October 11		at Wisconsin	Camp Randall Stadium; Madison, WI	L 0–34	30,000	
October 18		Florida*	Stagg Field; Chicago, IL	L 0–19	10,000	
October 25		Ole Miss*	Stagg Field; Chicago, IL	T 0–0		
November 1		Princeton*	Stagg Field; Chicago, IL	T 0–0	35,000	
November 8		Purdue	Stagg Field; Chicago, IL (rivalry)	L 7–26	20,000	
November 15		Illinois	Stagg Field; Chicago, IL	L 0–28	18,500	
November 22		at Michigan	Michigan Stadium; Ann Arbor, MI (rivalry)	L 0–16	42,078	
*Non-conference game; All times are in Central time
