= Russ Peterson (gridiron football) =

American football player (1905–1971)

Profile
- Position: Tackle

Personal information
- Born: August 25, 1905; Midale, Saskatchewan, Canada
- Died: October 1971 (age 66)

Career information
- College: Montana

Career history
- Boston Braves (1932)
- Stats at Pro Football Reference

Russell Harold Peterson (August 25, 1905 – October 1971) was an American football tackle who played in the National Football League (NFL) for the Boston Braves. He played college football at the University of Montana.

Peterson was born on August 25, 1905, in Midale, Saskatchewan. He attended Custer County High School in Miles City, Montana. Peterson attended college at the University of Montana where he played college football. He played as a lineman in the National Football League for the Boston Braves in 1932. He played in three games in the NFL.
