= 1930 Ohio State Buckeyes football team =

American college football season

1930 Ohio State Buckeyes football
- Conference: Big Ten Conference
- Record: 5–2–1 (2–2–1 Big Ten)
- Head coach: Sam Willaman (2nd season)
- Home stadium: Ohio Stadium

1930 Big Ten Conference football standings
	Conf.					Overall
Team	W		L		T	W		L		T
No. 5 Michigan +	5	–	0	–	0	8	–	0	–	1
No. 4 Northwestern +	5	–	0	–	0	7	–	1	–	0
Purdue	4	–	2	–	0	6	–	2	–	0
Wisconsin	2	–	2	–	1	6	–	2	–	1
Ohio State	2	–	2	–	1	5	–	2	–	1
Minnesota	1	–	3	–	0	3	–	4	–	1
Indiana	1	–	3	–	0	2	–	5	–	1
Illinois	1	–	4	–	0	3	–	5	–	0
Iowa	0	–	1	–	0	4	–	4	–	0
Chicago	0	–	4	–	0	2	–	5	–	2
+ – Conference co-champions; Rankings from Dickinson System

The 1930 Ohio State Buckeyes football team represented Ohio State University as a member the Big Ten Conference during the 1930 college football season. Led by second-year head coach Sam Willaman, the Buckeyes compiled an overall record of 5–2–1, with a mark of 2–2–1 in conference play, placing fifth.

== Schedule ==
Date	Opponent	Site	Result	Attendance	Source
September 27	Mount Union*	Ohio Stadium; Columbus, OH	W 59–0	16,000	
October 4	Indiana	Ohio Stadium; Columbus, OH	W 23–0	24,716	
October 11	at Northwestern	Dyche Stadium; Evanston, IL	L 2–19	28,000	
October 18	Michigan	Ohio Stadium; Columbus, OH (rivalry)	L 0–13	68,549	
November 1	Wisconsin	Ohio Stadium; Columbus, OH	T 0–0	40,488	
November 8	vs. Navy*	Municipal Stadium; Baltimore, MD	W 27–0	45,000	
November 15	Pittsburgh*	Ohio Stadium; Columbus, OH	W 16–7	39,581	
November 22	at Illinois	Memorial Stadium; Champaign, IL (Illibuck)	W 12–9	16,881	
*Non-conference game
