= 1930 Purdue Boilermakers football team =

American college football season

1930 Purdue Boilermakers football
- Conference: Big Ten Conference
- Record: 6–2 (4–2 Big Ten)
- Head coach: Noble Kizer (1st season)
- Captain: None
- Home stadium: Ross–Ade Stadium

1930 Big Ten Conference football standings
	Conf.					Overall
Team	W		L		T	W		L		T
No. 5 Michigan +	5	–	0	–	0	8	–	0	–	1
No. 4 Northwestern +	5	–	0	–	0	7	–	1	–	0
Purdue	4	–	2	–	0	6	–	2	–	0
Wisconsin	2	–	2	–	1	6	–	2	–	1
Ohio State	2	–	2	–	1	5	–	2	–	1
Minnesota	1	–	3	–	0	3	–	4	–	1
Indiana	1	–	3	–	0	2	–	5	–	1
Illinois	1	–	4	–	0	3	–	5	–	0
Iowa	0	–	1	–	0	4	–	4	–	0
Chicago	0	–	4	–	0	2	–	5	–	2
+ – Conference co-champions; Rankings from Dickinson System

The 1930 Purdue Boilermakers football team was an American football team that represented Purdue University during the 1930 college football season. In their first season under head coach Noble Kizer, the Boilermakers compiled a 6–2 record, finished in third place in the Big Ten Conference with a 4–2 record against conference opponents, and outscored opponents by a total of 150 to 41.

== Schedule ==
Date	Opponent	Site	Result	Attendance	Source
October 4	Baylor*	Ross–Ade Stadium; West Lafayette, IN	W 20–7	11,000	
October 11	at Michigan	Michigan Stadium; Ann Arbor, MI	L 13–14	45,000	
October 18	at Iowa	Iowa Stadium; Iowa City, IA	W 20–0	18,000	
October 25	Wisconsin^{†}	Ross–Ade Stadium; West Lafayette, IN	W 7–6	25,000	
November 1	at Illinois	Memorial Stadium; Champaign, IL (rivalry)	W 25–0	30,000	
November 8	at Chicago	Stagg Field; Chicago, IL (rivalry)	W 26–7	20,000	
November 15	Butler*	Ross–Ade Stadium; West Lafayette, IN	W 33–0	8,000	
November 22	Indiana	Ross–Ade Stadium; West Lafayette, IN (Old Oaken Bucket)	L 6–7	20,000	
*Non-conference game; ^{†}Homecoming

== Roster ==
- Gene Boswell, T
- Horace Buttner, T-G
- Paul R. Calvert, E
- Hal Chasey, HB
- J. M. Christman, G
- C. O. Helmer, T
- Roy Horstmann, FB
- John Husar, T
- Clarence Janecek, G
- Fred Keegan, QB
- Howard Kissell, HB
- Ben Merz, E
- Ookie Miller, C
- Richard Montanus, E
- Paul Moss, E
- John Oehler, C
- Lew Pope, HB
- James Purvis, HB
- Eddie Risk, HB
- George Stears, G
- Don Trimble, G
- Ed Ungers, T
- George Van Bibber, T
- Sam Voinoff, G
- George Weaver, QB
- John White, QB
- Alex Yunevich, FB
