= Stud Stennett =

American football player (1907–1989)

- Stennett (#30), circa 1932

No. 20, 46
- Position: Back

Personal information
- Born: February 8, 1907; LeRoy, Kansas, U.S.
- Died: August 23, 1989 (aged 82); Ventura, California, U.S.
- Listed height: 6 ft 0 in (1.83 m)
- Listed weight: 194 lb (88 kg)

Career information
- High school: Ventura
- College: Saint Mary's

Career history
- Portsmouth Spartans (1931); Chicago Cardinals (1932); Moraga Wolves (1934)

Awards and highlights
- Second-team All-American (1929); Third-team All-American (1930)
- Stats at Pro Football Reference

Fredrick Francis "Stud" Stennett (February 8, 1907 – August 23, 1989) was an American professional football back who played in the National Football League (NFL) with the Portsmouth Spartans and Chicago Cardinals. He played college football for the Saint Mary's Gaels.

== Early life ==
Fredrick Francis Stennett was born on February 8, 1907, in LeRoy, Kansas. He attended Ventura High School in Ventura, California in 1923 and 1924, playing on the school's first-ever football teams.

== College career ==
Stennet was on the first-ever football team at Ventura College in 1925. He then attended Saint Mary's College of California from 1926 to 1930. He earned All-Pacific Coast honors in 1929 and 1930 at halfback. Stennet was named a United Press second-team All-American in 1929 and an Associated Press third-team All-American in 1930. He was a team captain his senior year in 1930, and also punted. Stennett was inducted into the Saint Mary's College Athletic Hall of Fame in 1975.

== Professional career ==
Stennet played in ten games, starting two, for the Portsmouth Spartans of the National Football League (NFL) in 1931. The Ventura County Star described him as a "star" of the team that ended up finishing second in the NFL with an 11–3 record.

Stennet signed with the Chicago Cardinals on August 17, 1932. He played in two games, starting one, for the Cardinals during the 1932 season, rushing seven times for negative three yards while also completing one of three passes for 11 yards.

Stennet started both league games for the Moraga Wolves of the American Legion League in 1934.

== Personal life ==
Stennet was inducted into the Ventura County Sports Hall of Fame in 1986. He lived in Ventura County for 64 years. He died on August 23, 1989, in Ventura, and was buried at Ivy Lawn Memorial Park.
