= Wes Fesler =

American athlete and coach (1908–1989)

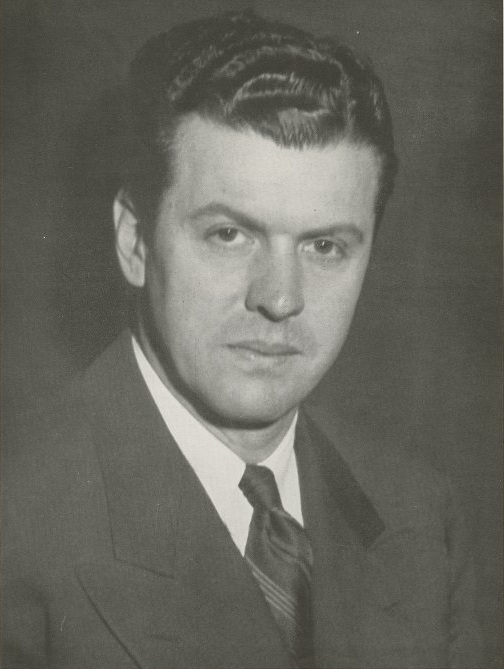
- Fesler from The Owl, 1947

Biographical details
- Born: June 29, 1908; Youngstown, Ohio, U.S.
- Died: July 30, 1989 (aged 81); Laguna Hills, California, U.S.

Playing career

Football
- 1928–1930: Ohio State

Basketball
- 1928–1931: Ohio State

Baseball
- 1928–1931: Ohio State
- Positions: End (football); Guard (basketball)

Coaching career (HC unless noted)

Football
- 1931–1932: Ohio State (assistant)
- 1933–1940: Harvard (backfield)
- 1941–1942: Wesleyan
- 1945: Princeton (assistant)
- 1946: Pittsburgh
- 1947–1950: Ohio State
- 1951–1953: Minnesota

Basketball
- 1933–1941: Harvard
- 1941–1944: Wesleyan
- 1945–1946: Princeton

Head coaching record
- Overall: 41–40–8 (football); 78–139 (basketball)
- Bowls: 1–0

Accomplishments and honors

Championships
- 1 Big Ten (1949)

Awards
- Unanimous All-American (1930); 2× Consensus All-American (1928, 1929); Chicago Tribune Silver Football (1930); 3× First-team All-Big Ten (1928, 1929, 1930)
- College Football Hall of Fame; Inducted in 1954 (profile)

Wesley Eugene Fesler (June 29, 1908 – July 30, 1989) was an American football, basketball, and baseball player and coach of football and basketball. He was a three-sport athlete at Ohio State University and a consensus first-team selection to the College Football All-America Team three straight years (1928–1930). Fesler was later the head football coach at Wesleyan University (1941–1942), the University of Pittsburgh (1946), Ohio State (1947–1950), and the University of Minnesota (1951–1953), compiling a career record of 41–40–8. He was also the head basketball coach at Harvard University (1933–1941), Wesleyan (1941–1944) and Princeton University (1945–1946), tallying a mark of 78–139 Fesler was inducted into the College Football Hall of Fame as a player in 1954.

== Playing career ==
Fesler came to Ohio State from Youngstown, Ohio. At Ohio State, Fesler was a member of both Pi Kappa Alpha and Phi Beta Kappa, earning a total of nine varsity letters in baseball, basketball, and football. He was a charter inductee in the Ohio State Varsity O Hall of Fame in 1977.

=== Football ===
Many believe Fesler's greatest talents were in football. He primarily played end and was a consensus first-team All-America selection in 1928 and 1929 and a unanimous first-team All-America selection in 1930. Depending on the game situation, he would sometimes move into the backfield as a fullback. In 1930, he was voted the Most Valuable Player in the Big Ten.

Jock Sutherland, the University of Pittsburgh coach, called Fesler "a one man team. It is unbelievable how that boy can do so many things." In 1939 Grantland Rice listed Fesler at end on his all-time college football team. Fesler was inducted into the College Football Hall of Fame in 1954.

In 1934, high-speed photographer "Doc" Edgerton took the now-classic photograph "Wes Fesler Kicking a Football." The stroboscope photograph demonstrated the dent in the ball at the point of contact.

=== Basketball ===
In basketball Fesler was a guard. He was the basketball captain as a junior in the spring of 1930, and the football captain as a senior in the Autumn of that year. He was Ohio State's first consensus first-team All-America selection in basketball in 1931.

== Coaching career ==
Fesler ignored interest from teams of the National Football League and instead pursued a career in coaching. He began his coaching career as an assistant to his Ohio State football coach, Sam Willaman, in 1931 and 1932. In 1933, Fesler accepted an offer from Harvard University as head coach of the basketball team and backfield coach of the football team. He stayed at Harvard until 1941. His stint at Harvard turned out to be the longest tenure of his career.

In 1941, Fesler accepted an offer from Wesleyan University to be the head coach of their football team. Unfortunately, the Wesleyan football program was interrupted after the 1942 season by World War II. In 1945, Fesler accepted an offer from Princeton as head basketball coach and assistant football coach. He later became the head football coach at the University of Pittsburgh in 1946. In 1947, he became the head coach at Ohio State. He resigned on December 9, 1950, citing "excessive pressure for winning football games". After leaving Ohio State, he became head coach at the University of Minnesota from 1951 to 1953.

Fesler's 1949 Ohio State team was the Big Ten Conference co-champion and beat California in the Rose Bowl. Fesler developed the talents of 1950 Heisman Trophy winner Vic Janowicz at Ohio State and two-time Big Ten MVP Paul Giel at Minnesota.

Fesler had a stronger record as a football coach than as a basketball coach. His combined record as a major college football head coach, at Pitt, Ohio State, and Minnesota, was 34–31–8. His combined record as basketball head coach at Harvard and Princeton was 67–108.

== Death ==
Fesler died on July 30, 1989, at the Palm Terrace Rest Home in Laguna Hills, California.

== Head coaching record ==
=== Football ===
Year	Team	Overall	Conference	Standing	Bowl/playoffs	Coaches^{#}	AP^{°}
Wesleyan Cardinals (Little Three) (1941–1942)
1941	Wesleyan	4–4					
1942	Wesleyan	3–5					
Wesleyan:		7–9					
Pittsburgh Panthers (Independent) (1946)
1946	Pittsburgh	3–5–1					
Pittsburgh:		3–5–1					
Ohio State Buckeyes (Big Ten Conference) (1947–1950)
1947	Ohio State	2–6–1	1–4–1	9th			
1948	Ohio State	6–3	3–3	4th			
1949	Ohio State	7–1–2	4–1–1	T–1st	W Rose		6
1950	Ohio State	6–3	5–2	T–2nd		10	14
Ohio State:		21–13–3	13–10–2				
Minnesota Golden Gophers (Big Ten Conference) (1951–1953)
1951	Minnesota	2–6–1	1–4–1	7th			
1952	Minnesota	4–3–2	3–1–2	T–4th			
1953	Minnesota	4–4–1	3–3–1	T–5th			
Minnesota:		10–13–4	7–8–4				
Total:		41–40–8					
National championship Conference title Conference division title or championship game berth
^{#}Rankings from final Coaches Poll.; ^{°}Rankings from final AP Poll.
