= 1930 Northwestern Wildcats football team =

American college football season

1930 Northwestern Wildcats football

Big Ten co-champion
- Conference: Big Ten Conference
- Record: 7–1 (5–0 Big Ten)
- Head coach: Dick Hanley (4th season)
- Captain: Henry Bruder
- Home stadium: Dyche Stadium

1930 Big Ten Conference football standings
	Conf.					Overall
Team	W		L		T	W		L		T
No. 5 Michigan +	5	–	0	–	0	8	–	0	–	1
No. 4 Northwestern +	5	–	0	–	0	7	–	1	–	0
Purdue	4	–	2	–	0	6	–	2	–	0
Wisconsin	2	–	2	–	1	6	–	2	–	1
Ohio State	2	–	2	–	1	5	–	2	–	1
Minnesota	1	–	3	–	0	3	–	4	–	1
Indiana	1	–	3	–	0	2	–	5	–	1
Illinois	1	–	4	–	0	3	–	5	–	0
Iowa	0	–	1	–	0	4	–	4	–	0
Chicago	0	–	4	–	0	2	–	5	–	2
+ – Conference co-champions; Rankings from Dickinson System

The 1930 Northwestern Wildcats team represented Northwestern University during the 1930 college football season. The Wildcats compiled a 7–1 record (5–0 against Big Ten Conference opponents), tied with Michigan for the Big Ten championship, and outscored their opponents by a combined total of 182 to 36.

== Schedule ==
Date	Opponent	Site	Result	Attendance	Source
October 4	Tulane*	Dyche Stadium; Evanston, IL	W 14–0	25,000	
October 11	Ohio State	Dyche Stadium; Evanston, IL	W 19–2	28,000	
October 18	at Illinois	Memorial Stadium; Champaign, IL (rivalry)	W 32–0	52,687	
October 25	Centre*	Dyche Stadium; Evanston, IL	W 45–7	30,000	
November 1	at Minnesota	Memorial Stadium; Minneapolis, MN	W 27–6	54,000	
November 8	at Indiana	Memorial Stadium; Bloomington, IN	W 25–0	15,000	
November 15	Wisconsin^{†}	Dyche Stadium; Evanston, IL	W 20–7	45,000	
November 22	Notre Dame*	Dyche Stadium; Evanston, IL (rivalry)	L 0–14	44,648	
*Non-conference game; ^{†}Homecoming
