= 1930 All-America college football team =

Official list of the best college football players of 1930

The 1930 All-America college football team is composed of college football players who were selected as All-Americans by various organizations and writers that chose All-America college football teams in 1930. The seven selectors recognized by the NCAA as "official" for the 1930 season are (1) Collier's Weekly, as selected by Grantland Rice, (2) the Associated Press, (3) the United Press, (4) the All-America Board, (5) the International News Service (INS), (6) the Newspaper Enterprise Association (NEA), and (7) the North American Newspaper Alliance (NANA).

== Consensus All-Americans ==
Following the death of Walter Camp in 1925, there was a proliferation of All-American teams in the late 1920s. For the year 1930, the NCAA recognizes seven published All-American teams as "official" designations for purposes of its consensus determinations. The following chart identifies the NCAA-recognized consensus All-Americans and displays which first-team designations they received.

Name	Position	School	Number	Selectors
Wes Fesler	End	Ohio State	7/7	AAB, AP, COL, INS, NANA, NEA, UP
Fred Sington	Tackle	Alabama	7/7	AAB, AP, COL, INS, NANA, NEA, UP
Ben Ticknor	Center	Harvard	7/7	AAB, AP, COL, INS, NANA, NEA, UP
Frank Carideo	Quarterback	Notre Dame	7/7	AAB, AP, COL, INS, NANA, NEA, UP
Marchy Schwartz	Halfback	Notre Dame	5/7	AP, INS, NANA, NEA, UP
Erny Pinckert	Halfback	USC	5/7	AAB, AP, COL, NANA, NEA
Ted Beckett	Guard	California	4/7	AAB, COL, INS, NANA
Leonard Macaluso	Fullback	Colgate	4/7	AP, COL, INS, UP
Barton Koch	Guard	Baylor	3/7	COL, NANA, NEA
Frank Baker	End	Northwestern	3/7	AP, INS, UP
Milo Lubratovich	Tackle	Wisconsin	2/7	NEA, UP

== All-American selections for 1930 ==
=== Ends ===
- Wes Fesler, Ohio State (College Football Hall of Fame) (AP-1; UP-1; COL-1; INS-1; NEA-1; CP-1; NANA; NYS-1; LAT; AAB)
- Frank Baker, Northwestern (AP-1; UP-1; INS-1; NEA-2; CP-1; NYS-1; LAT)
- Garrett Arbelbide, USC (AP-2; INS-3; NEA-1; NYEP-1)
- Herb Maffett, Georgia (UP-3; NYEP-1)
- Jerry Dalrymple, Tulane (College Football Hall of Fame) (AP-3; UP-2; COL-1; INS-2; CP-2; NANA; AAB)
- Tom Conley, Notre Dame (AP-2; UP-2; NEA-2)
- Harry Ebding, St. Mary's (AP-3; INS-2; NEA-3)
- Bill Schwartz, Vanderbilt (CP-2)
- George A. Ellert, Syracuse (INS-3; CP-3)
- Louie Long, SMU (NEA-3; CP-3)
- Bill McKalip, Oregon State (UP-3)

=== Tackles ===
- Fred Sington, Alabama (College Football Hall of Fame) (AP-1; UP-1; COL-1; INS-1; NEA-1; CP-1; NANA; NYEP-1; NYS-1; LAT; AAB)
- Milo Lubratovich, Wisconsin (AP-3; UP-1; INS-2; NEA-1; CP-1)
- Turk Edwards, Washington State (AP-1; UP-3; INS-1; NEA-2; CP-2; NYS-1)
- Hugh Rhea, Nebraska (COL-1; INS-2; CP-2)
- Harold Ahlskog, Washington State (NYEP-1)
- George Van Bibber, Purdue (AP-2; NEA-3; CP-3)
- Jack Price, Army (AP-2; UP-2; NEA-3; NANA; LAT)
- Al Culver, Notre Dame (UP-2)
- Dallas Marvil, Northwestern (NEA-2)
- Blimp Bowstrom, Navy (UP-3)
- Frank Foley, Fordham (AP-3)
- John Goodwillie, Dartmouth (INS-3)
- Vance Maree, Georgia Tech (INS-3)
- Foots Clement, Alabama (CP-3)
- Art Massucci, University of Detroit

=== Guards ===
- Ted Beckett, California (COL-1; INS-1; NEA-3; NANA; AAB)
- Barton Koch, Baylor (College Football Hall of Fame) (AP-2; UP-2; COL-1; NEA-1; CP-1; NANA; NYS-1; LAT)
- Bert Metzger, Notre Dame (College Football Hall of Fame) (AP-1; UP-1; CP-2)
- Wade Woodworth, Northwestern (AP-1; UP-2; INS-2; NEA-1; CP-2; NYEP-1; LAT)
- Henry Wisniewski, Fordham (UP-1; NEA-2; CP-1; NYEP-1)
- Johnny Baker, USC (AP-2; UP-3; NYS-1)
- Ralph Maddox, Georgia (INS-1)
- Frederick J. Linehan, Yale (UP-3; INS-3; AAB)
- Charles Humber, Army (AP-3; INS-2)
- Gabriel Bromberg, Dartmouth (AP-3; NEA-2)
- Austin Colbert, Oregon (INS-3)
- Biggie Munn, Minnesota (NEA-3)
- Sam T. Selby, Ohio State (CP-3)
- Doyle, Kentucky (CP-3)

=== Centers ===
- Ben Ticknor, Harvard (College Football Hall of Fame) (AP-1; UP-1; COL-1; INS-1; NEA-1; CP-2; NANA; NYS-1; LAT; AAB)
- Mel Hein, Washington State (College and Pro Football Hall of Fame) (AP-2; UP-3; INS-2; NEA-2; CP-1; AAB [t])
- Thomas "Tony" Slano, Fordham (AP-3; UP-2; CP-3; NYEP-1)
- Lloyd Roberts, Tulane (INS-3)
- Noble Atkins, TCU (NEA-3)

=== Quarterbacks ===
- Frank Carideo, Notre Dame (College Football Hall of Fame) (AP-1; UP-1; COL-1; INS-1; NEA-1; CP-1; NANA; NYEP-1; NYS-1; LAT; AAB)
- Bobby Dodd, Tennessee (AP-2; UP-2; COL-1; NEA-1 [hb]; CP-2)
- Marshall Duffield, USC (AP-3; CP-3)
- Bill Morton, Dartmouth (UP-3; NEA-3 [hb])
- Albie Booth, Yale (AP-2 [hb]; INS-2; NEA-2)
- Harry Newman, Michigan (College Football Hall of Fame) (INS-3)
- Eddie Baker, Pittsburgh (NEA-3)

=== Halfbacks ===
- Marchy Schwartz, Notre Dame (College Football Hall of Fame) (AP-1; UP-1; INS-1; NEA-1; CP-1; NANA; NYS-1; LAT)
- Erny Pinckert, USC (College Football Hall of Fame) (AP-1; UP-2; COL-1; NEA-1 [fb]; CP-2; NANA; NYS-1; LAT; AAB)
- John Suther, Alabama (AP-3; UP-3; INS-2; CP-1; NYEP-1)
- Phil Moffatt, Stanford (UP-1)
- Cornelius Murphy, Fordham (INS-1)
- Louis Weller, Haskell (UP-2; NEA-2)
- Marty Brill, Notre Dame (UP-3; INS-2; NEA-3; AAB)
- Frank Christensen, Utah (INS-3; NEA-3 [fb])
- Hank Bruder, Northwestern (AP-2)
- Red Bethea, Florida (CP-2)
- Fred Stennett, St. Mary's (AP-3)
- Eddie Risk, Purdue (INS-3)
- Gil Berry, Illinois (CP-3)
- Lou Kirn, Navy (CP-3)

=== Fullbacks ===
- Leonard Macaluso, Colgate (AP-1; UP-1; COL-1; INS-1; CP-1; NYEP-1 [hb]; NYS-1; LAT)
- Lafayette Russell, Northwestern (UP-2; NANA; NYEP-1; AAB)
- Joe Savoldi, Notre Dame (AP-2)
- Jack Roberts, Georgia (INS-3; CP-2)
- James Bausch, Kansas (CP-3)
- Johnny Kitzmiller, Oregon (College Football Hall of Fame) (UP-3; NEA-2 [hb])
- Elmer Schwartz, Washington State (AP-3)
- John Lewis Cain, Alabama (College Football Hall of Fame) (INS-2)
- Clarke Hinkle, Bucknell (College and Pro Football Hall of Fame) (NEA-2)

== Key ==
- **Bold** – Consensus All-American
- -1 – First-team selection
- -2 – Second-team selection
- -3 – Third-team selection

=== NCAA official selectors ===
- AAB = All America Board
- AP = Associated Press: "To help settle the All-America argument, the Associated Press this year conducted the most comprehensive poll of expert opinion yet attempted. A total of 213 sports editors and writers scanning the gridiron activities in all sections of the country, contributed their selections after studying all the available information."
- UP = United Press, "selected by the United Press sports staff in collaboration with leading coaches in every section of the country"
- COL = Collier's Weekly, "picked annually by Grantland Rice and issued in the Collier's weekly magazine"
- INS = International News Service, based not only on "the writer's personal observations but on the basis of reports from International News Service footballexperts from all parts of the country"
- NEA = Newspaper Editors Association, chosen by the 33 members of the NEA Service National Bord of Football Coaches, Officials and Sports Writers
- NANA = North American Newspaper Association

=== Other selectors ===
- CP = Central Press Association: "Two hundred captains of college football teams were polled by the Central Press Association in a nationwide survey. Each captain was asked to name only those men against or with whom he played."
- NYEP = New York Evening Post
- NYS = New York Sun
- WC = Walter Camp Football Foundation
- LAT = Los Angeles Times

== See also ==
- 1930 All-Big Six Conference football team
- 1930 All-Big Ten Conference football team
- 1930 All-Pacific Coast Conference football team
- 1930 All-Southern football team
- 1930 All-Southwest Conference football team
