= Biggie Munn =

American football player and coach (1908–1975)

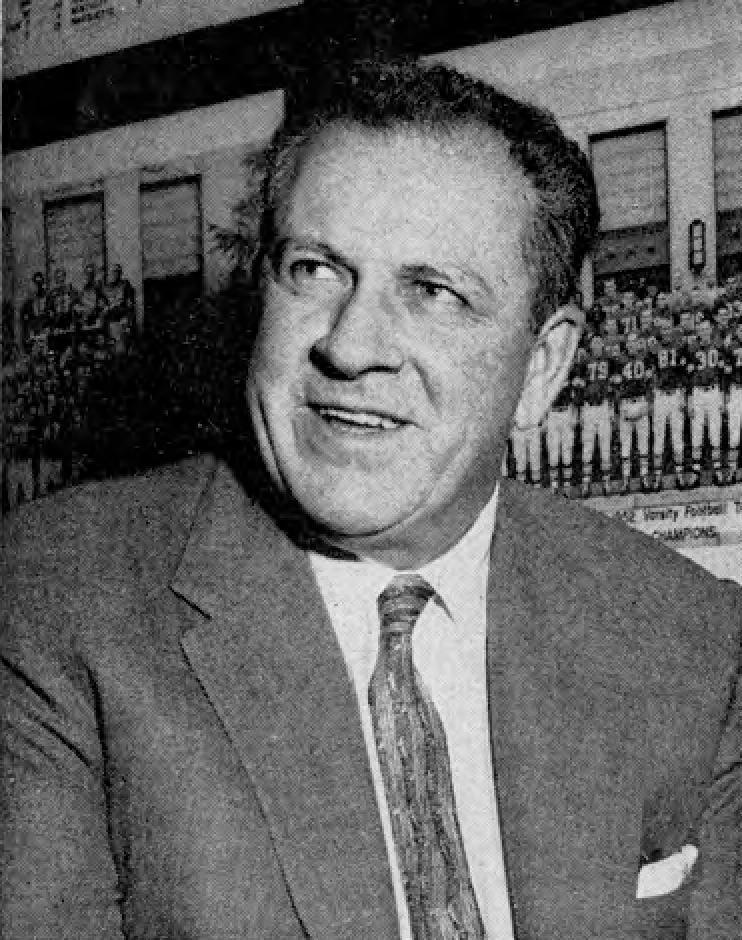

Biographical details
- Born: September 11, 1908; Grow Township, Minnesota, U.S.
- Died: March 18, 1975 (aged 66); Lansing, Michigan, U.S.

Playing career

Football
- 1929–1931: Minnesota
- Positions: Guard, fullback

Coaching career (HC unless noted)

Football
- 1935–1936: Albright
- 1938–1945: Michigan (assistant)
- 1946: Syracuse
- 1947–1953: Michigan State

Basketball
- 1936–1937: Albright

Administrative career (AD unless noted)
- 1954–1971: Michigan State

Head coaching record
- Overall: 71–16–3 (football); 9–9 (basketball)
- Bowls: 1–0

Accomplishments and honors

Championships
- Football; 2 National (1951, 1952); 1 Big Ten (1953)

Awards
- Consensus All-American (1931); Third-team All-American (1930); Chicago Tribune Silver Football (1931); 2× First-team All-Big Ten (1930, 1931); AFCA Coach of the Year (1952)
- College Football Hall of Fame; Inducted in 1959 (profile)

Clarence Lester "Biggie" Munn (September 11, 1908 – March 18, 1975) was an American football player, coach, and college athletics administrator. He was the head football coach at Albright College (1935–1936), Syracuse University (1946), and most notably Michigan State College (1947–1953), where his 1952 squad won a national championship. Munn retired from coaching in 1953 to assume duties as Michigan State's athletic director, a position he held until 1971. Each year, the Michigan State Spartans football team hands out the "Biggie Munn Award" to the team's most motivational player. Michigan State's Munn Ice Arena, built in 1974, is named in his honor. Munn was inducted into the College Football Hall of Fame as a coach in 1959, and, in 1961, he became Michigan State's first inductee into the Michigan Sports Hall of Fame. He authored the coaching textbook Michigan State Multiple Offense in 1953.

== Early life and playing career ==
Munn was born in the former Grow Township, now known as Andover, Minnesota. A 1932 graduate of the University of Minnesota, he played guard and fullback for the Golden Gophers under head coach Fritz Crisler. Munn was a two-time first-team All-Big Ten Conference selection and during his senior year in 1931, he served football team captain, was a consensus All-American, and was awarded the Chicago Tribune Silver Football as the Big Ten's best player. Many considered Munn as the top collegiate punter in the nation. He stood just under six feet and weighed 215 pounds, but was recorded running 100 yards in 10 seconds. Munn also served as captain of Minnesota's track and field team, finishing runner-up in the shot put at the 1932 NCAA Track and Field Championships.

== Early coaching career ==
Three years after his playing career ended, Munn got his first head coaching job at Albright College in Reading, Pennsylvania, where he stayed for two seasons (1935–1936), compiling a record of 13–2–1. From 1938 to 1945, he was an assistant football coach at the University of Michigan, once again under Crisler. Munn served as head coach at Syracuse University for one season in 1946 before leaving for Michigan State. One of Munn's assistants at Syracuse was former Orangeman standout Duffy Daugherty, who followed Munn to Michigan State and assisted him there for seven seasons before succeeding Munn as head coach. Munn is one of the few people to have coached at both Michigan State and its archrival Michigan.

== Coaching career at Michigan State ==
In 1947, Munn and the Michigan State administration, led by university president John A. Hannah, approached University of Notre Dame president Father Cavanaugh to have his Fighting Irish play the Spartans for the first time since 1921. Michigan State initially offered to let Notre Dame take 80 percent of the gate, but Cavanaugh insisted they split the receipts down the middle. Munn was the only coach to beat Notre Dame head coach Frank Leahy three years in a row (1950–1952).

Munn developed the "Wingback Deep" formation of his formula "Michigan State Multiple Offense." The play featured a shifting back and forth between a T-formation and a single-wing formation with a direct snap to the tailback between a T-formation quarterback's legs.

On the Michigan State dressing room wall, Munn hung a statement on fundamentals that his players were required to read before every home game: "Do not cheat your team or your teammates. Know your plays. Block. Protect. Add to what we are trying to do. [signed] Biggie."

During the latter part of his coaching career, Munn developed the talents of Willie Thrower, the Big Ten's first black quarterback. In 1953 with the Chicago Bears, Thrower became the first black quarterback to play in the National Football League.

In 1952, Munn was named the AFCA Coach of the Year, coaching Michigan State to 9–0 record and a national championship. In 1953, Michigan State's first year of conference play in the Big Ten, the Spartans shared the conference title with Illinois and went to the Rose Bowl, where they beat UCLA, 28–20.

Shortly after the Rose Bowl victory, Michigan State's athletic director, Ralph H. Young retired.

At the urging of Hannah, Munn, who had experienced intestinal ulcers during his tenure at Michigan State, stepped down from coaching at age 45 to assume the office of athletic director and remained in that position until 1971, when he retired following a stroke.

Munn named his chief assistant, Duffy Daugherty, as his successor in the head coaching position.

During his tenure as Michigan State's head football coach, Munn tutored 17 All-Americans. His teams have retained the school's top four season marks for rushing-yards-per-game: 1948 (304.5 yards/game), 1951 (293.9 yards), 1952 (272.4), and 1950 (269.3).

Munn was inducted into the College Football Hall of Fame in 1959. Syracuse University enshrined him in its hall of fame in 1973. Munn was inducted into Minnesota's "M" Club in 1993.

== Family and death ==
Munn married the former Vera Jane Wattles (January 21, 1905 – January 4, 2004) in June 1935. The couple adopted two children: Michael and Jane Austin. Munn died on March 18, 1975, in Lansing, Michigan, at the age of 66.

== Head coaching record ==
=== Football ===
Year	Team	Overall	Conference	Standing	Bowl/playoffs	Coaches^{#}	AP^{°}
Albright Lions (Independent) (1935–1936)
1935	Albright	7–1					
1936	Albright	6–1–1					
Albright:		13–2–1					
Syracuse Orangemen (Independent) (1946)
1946	Syracuse	4–5					
Syracuse:		4–5					
Michigan State Spartans (Independent) (1947–1952)
1947	Michigan State	7–2					
1948	Michigan State	6–2–2					14
1949	Michigan State	6–3					19
1950	Michigan State	8–1				9	8
1951	Michigan State	9–0				2	2
1952	Michigan State	9–0				1	1
Michigan State Spartans (Big Ten Conference) (1953)
1953	Michigan State	9–1	5–1	T–1st	W Rose	3	3
Michigan State:		54–9–2	5–1				
Total:		71–16–3					
National championship Conference title Conference division title or championship game berth
^{#}Rankings from final Coaches Poll.; ^{°}Rankings from final AP Poll.

== Bibliography ==
- Munn, Clarence L. (Biggie) (1953). Michigan State Multiple Offense. ASIN B0007DRAY4.
