= 1930 college football rankings =

- Season: 1930
- Bowl season: 1930–31 bowl games
- End of season champions: Notre Dame (Note: per Boand System, Dickinson System (received Rissman Trophy), Dunkel System, Houlgate System, Erskine Trophy poll, Bonniwell Trophy vote, Billingsley Report, Helms Athletic Foundation, National Championship Foundation, Poling System); Alabama (Note: per Berryman QPRS, College Football Researchers Association, College Football Researchers Association, Parke H. Davis (Spalding's Official Foot Ball Guide), Sagarin Ratings Elo chess method, Sagarin Ratings Predictor method)

The 1930 college football rankings ranked the best teams participating in the 1930 college football season.

== Champions (by method) ==
Various different rankings (using differing methodologies) have identified Alabama or Notre Dame as champion.

- Berryman QPRS: Alabama
- Billingsley Report: Notre Dame
- Bonniwell Trophy vote: (Note: awarded upon unanimous consensus of the board of the Veteran Athletes of Philadelphia) Notre Dame
- Boand System: Notre Dame
- College Football Researchers Association: Alabama
- Parke H. Davis (Note: for Spalding's Official Foot Ball Guide): Alabama
- Dickinson System: Notre Dame
- Dunkel System: Notre Dame
- Erskine Trophy poll: Notre Dame
- Helms Athletic Foundation: Notre Dame
- Houlgate System: Notre Dame
- National Championship Foundation: Notre Dame
- Poling System: Notre Dame
- Sagarin Ratings Elo chess method: Alabama
- Sagarin Ratings Predictor method: Alabama

Note: Boand System, Dickinson System, Dunkel System, Houlgate System, Erskine Trophy poll, and Bonniwell Trophy vote were given contemporarily. All other rankings were given retroactively

== Dickinson System ==
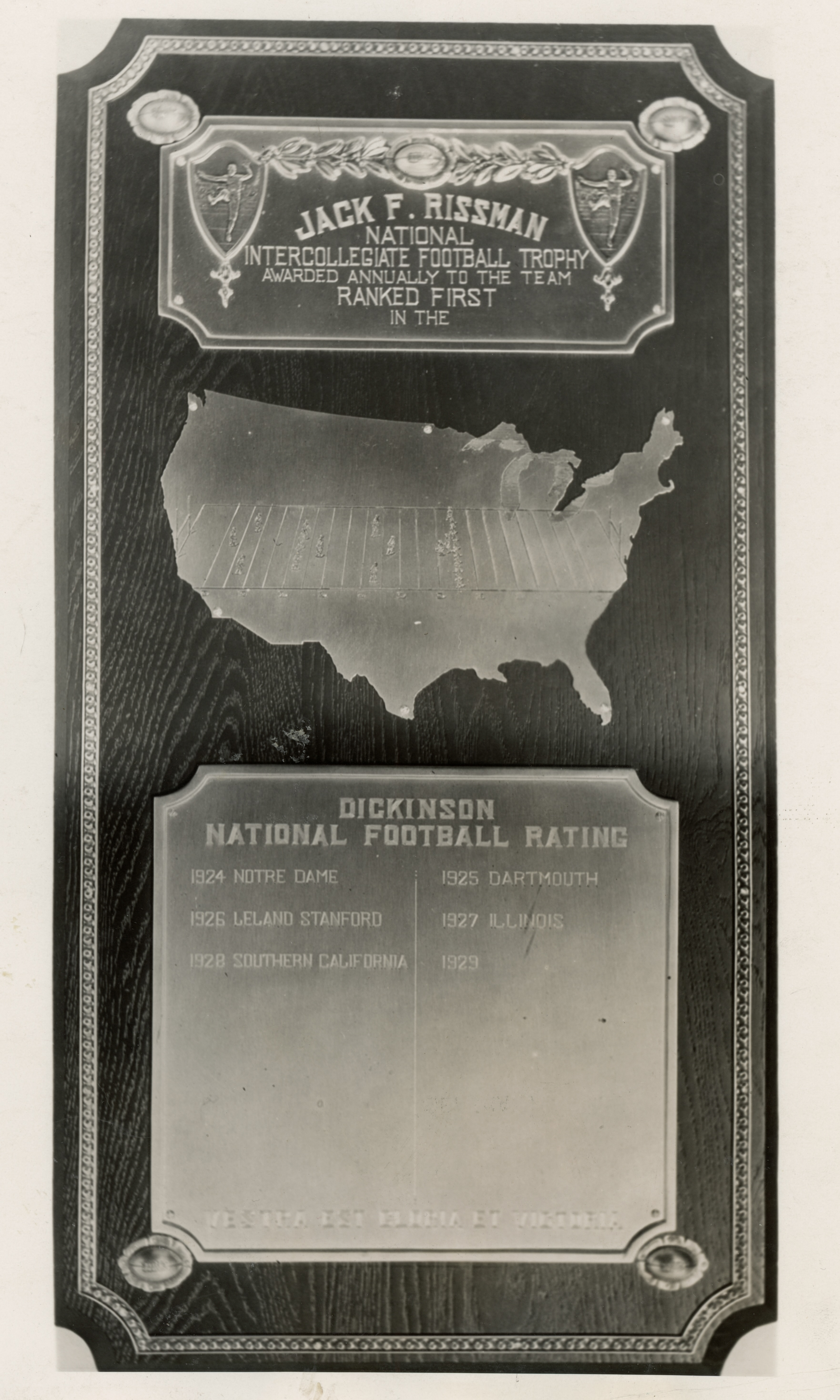
Jack F. Rissman National Intercollegiate Football Trophy — Awarded annually to the team ranked first in the Dickinson National Football Rating

The Dickinson System was a mathematical rating system devised by University of Illinois economics professor Frank G. Dickinson.

Notre Dame, Washington State and Alabama, all unbeaten and untied at the end of the regular season, were ranked first, second and third by Dickinson, with the Irish getting the higher rating based on their opposition. The ratings were made before the 1931 Rose Bowl that matched Washington State and Alabama, with Alabama winning, 24 to 0. Notre Dame did not participate in a postseason bowl game.

Rank	Team	Record	Rating
1	Notre Dame	10–0	25.13
2	Washington State	9–0	20.44
3	Alabama	9–0	20.18
4	Northwestern	7–1	18.63
5	Michigan	8–0–1	18.34
6	USC	8–2	17.98
7	Stanford	9–1–1	17.92
8	Dartmouth	7–1–1	17.11
9	Army	9–1–1	16.66
10	Tennessee	9–1	16.15
11	Tulane	8–1	16.05

== See also ==
- 1930 College Football All-America Team
