= Turk Edwards =

American football player and coach (1907–1973)

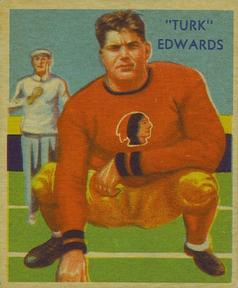

No. 17
- Position: Tackle

Personal information
- Born: September 28, 1907; Mold, Washington, U.S.
- Died: January 10, 1973 (aged 65); Kirkland, Washington, U.S.
- Listed height: 6 ft 2 in (1.88 m)
- Listed weight: 255 lb (116 kg)

Career information
- High school: Clarkston (Clarkston, Washington)
- College: Washington State

Career history

Playing
- Boston Braves / Redskins / Washington Redskins (1932–1940)

Coaching
- Washington Redskins (assistant) (1941–1945); Washington Redskins (head coach) (1946–1948)

Awards and highlights
- NFL champion (1937); 3× First-team All-Pro (1934, 1936, 1937); NFL All-Star (1939); NFL 1930s All-Decade Team; 70 Greatest Redskins; First-team All-American (1930); 2× First-team All-PCC (1930, 1931)

Career statistics
- Games played: 86
- Starts: 77
- Touchdowns: 2
- Stats at Pro Football Reference
- Coaching profile at Pro Football Reference
- Pro Football Hall of Fame
- College Football Hall of Fame

Albert Glen "Turk" Edwards (September 28, 1907 – January 10, 1973) was an American professional football player who was a tackle in the National Football League (NFL). He played college football for the Washington State Cougars, earning All-American honors in 1930. Edwards played his entire NFL career with the Washington Redskins, starting with their first six seasons in Boston, and later became the head coach. Edwards was inducted into the Pro Football Hall of Fame in 1969.

== College career ==
After graduation from Clarkston High School in 1928 in Clarkston, Washington, Edwards played college football at Washington State College (now University) in nearby Pullman from 1929 to 1931. He helped lead the Cougars to a 9–0 record during the 1930 season and an invitation to the Rose Bowl on New Year's Day. Edwards and teammate Mel Hein became the first All-Americans from Washington State.

He was a member of the Alpha Omicron chapter of Theta Chi fraternity while in college. The nickname "Turk" was given to him by head coach Babe Hollingbery.

== Professional career ==
After finishing college, Edwards received offers from three NFL franchises, the recently created Boston Braves, the New York Giants, and the Portsmouth Spartans. He chose the highest bid: $1,500 for 10 games from the Braves, a team that would later become the Boston Redskins and then move to Washington, D.C. in 1937.

Edwards played for the Braves/Redskins for nine seasons, winning All-NFL honors from major media outlets every year of his career except his last one.

Edwards sustained a career-ending injury during a coin-tossing ceremony prior to a game against the New York Giants in 1940. After calling the coin toss and shaking hands with college teammate Mel Hein (the Giants' captain), Edwards attempted to pivot around to head back to his sideline. However, his cleats caught in the grass and his oft-injured knee gave way, ending his season and ultimately his career.

Edwards was inducted into the Pro Football Hall of Fame in 1969, which he described as "certainly the greatest honor." He was introduced at the ceremony by Mel Hein, who said, "The thing I'll remember most about Turk Edwards is that he was a true sportsman, a true gentleman and still is."

== Coaching career ==
Edwards continued with the Redskins as an assistant coach from 1941 to 1945 and then as the head coach from 1946 to 1948. After 17 consecutive seasons with the Redskins, Edwards retired from professional football.

== Post-football career ==
After retiring from coaching, Edwards returned to the Pacific Northwest and operated a sporting goods store in Seattle's University District. In 1961, he moved to Kelso, where he spent 11 years working in the Cowlitz County assessor's office.

After a long illness, Edwards died at age 65 at his Kirkland home on January 10, 1973.
