= Washington State Cougars football =

Football team of Washington State University

2026 Washington State Cougars football team
- First season: 1894; 132 years ago
- Athletic director: Jon Haarlow
- Head coach: Kirby Moore; 1st season, 1–2 (.333)
- Location: Pullman, Washington
- Stadium: Martin Stadium (capacity: 32,952)
- NCAA division: Division I FBS
- Conference: Pac-12
- Colors: Crimson and gray
- All-time record: 514–560–38 (.479)
- Bowl record: 8–11 (.421)

National championships
- Unclaimed: 1915

Conference championships
- PCC: 1917, 1930 Pac-12: 1997, 2002

Division championships
- Pac-12 North: 2018
- Consensus All-Americans: 8
- Rivalries: Washington (rivalry); Oregon State (rivalry); Idaho (rivalry); Northwest Championship; Boise State (rivalry)

Uniforms
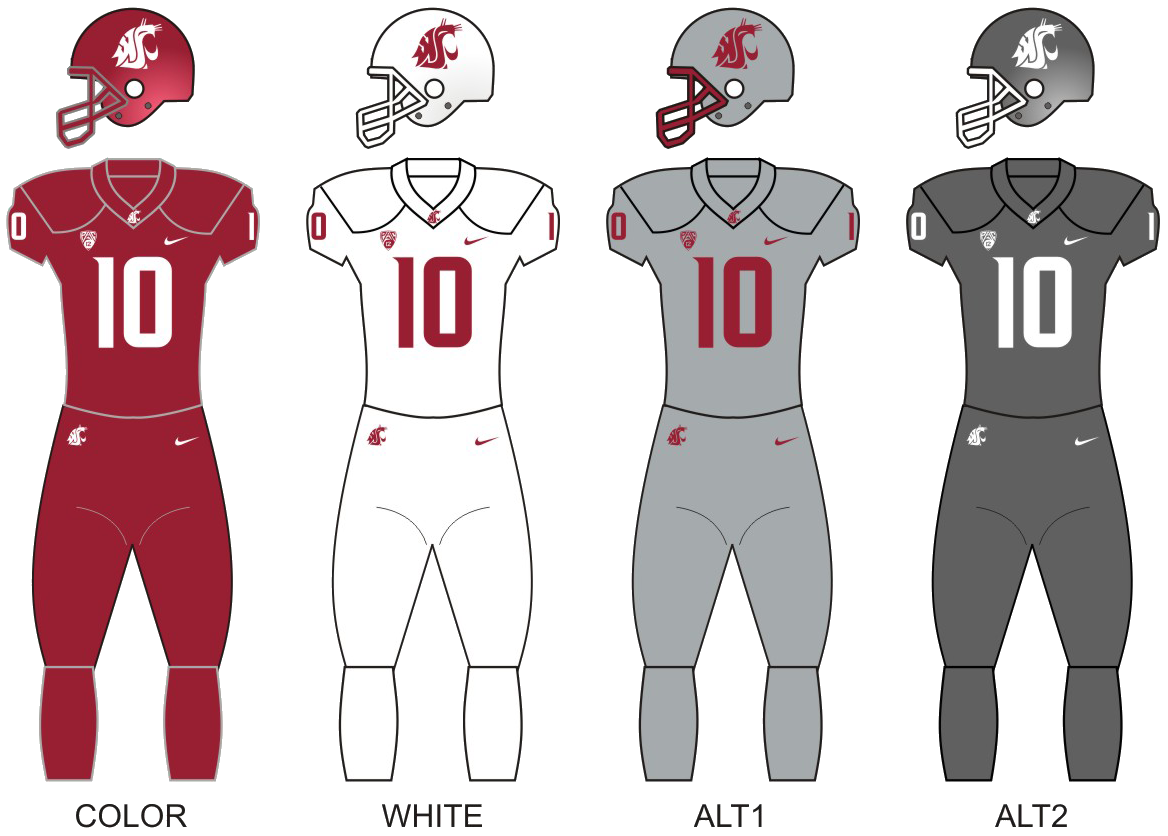
- Fight song: Washington State University Fight Song
- Mascot: Butch T. Cougar
- Marching band: Cougar Marching Band
- Outfitter: Nike
- Website: WSUCougars.com

The Washington State Cougars football program is the intercollegiate American football team for Washington State University, located in Pullman, Washington. The team competes at the NCAA Division I level in the FBS and is a member of the Pac-12 Conference (Pac-12). Known as the Cougars, the first football team was fielded in 1894.

The Cougars play home games on campus at Martin Stadium, which opened in 1972; the site dates back to 1892 as Soldier Field and was renamed Rogers Field ten years later. Its present seating capacity is 35,117. Their main rivals are the Washington Huskies; the teams historically end the regular season with the Apple Cup rivalry game in late November but that is no longer the case with the Washington Huskies joining the Big Ten.

== History ==
=== Early history (1894–1977) ===
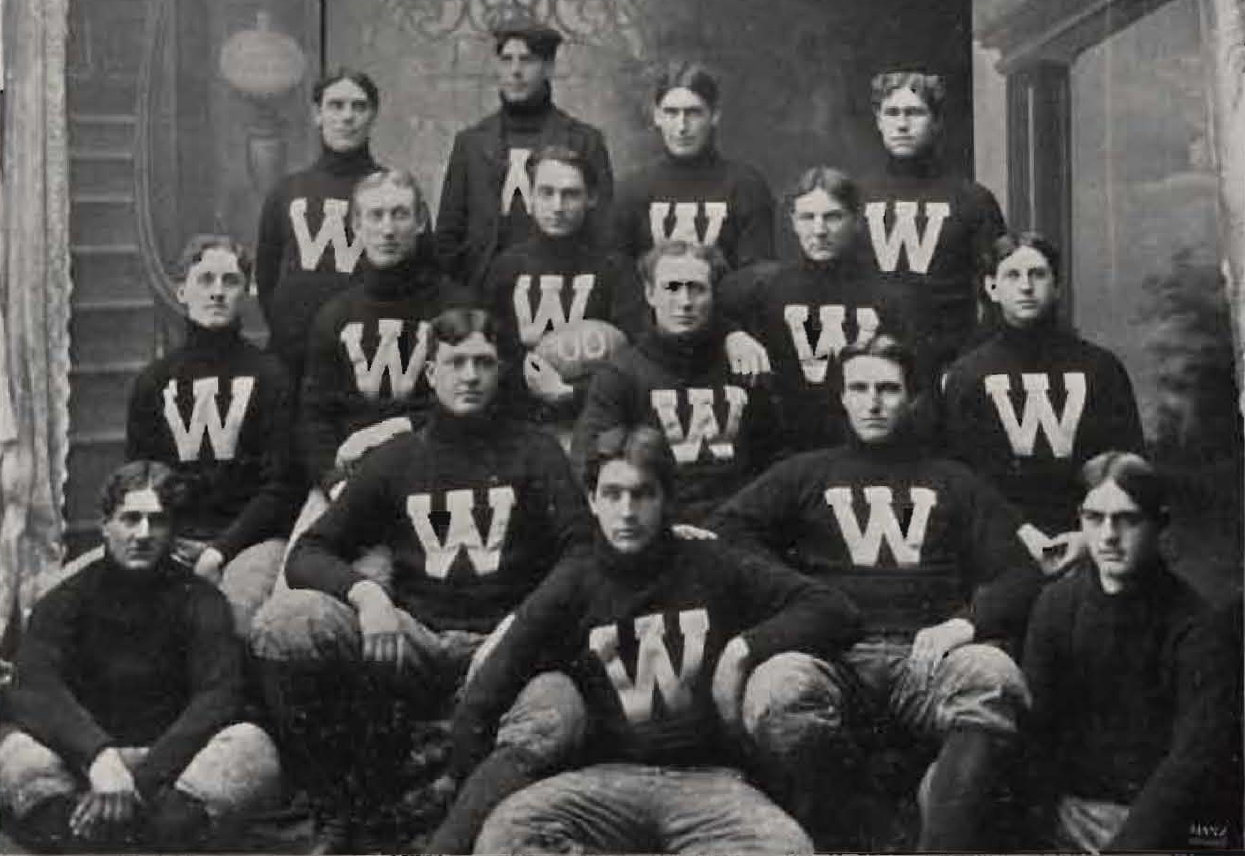
Washington Agricultural College football team in 1900

Washington State's first head football coach was William Goodyear. That team played only two games in its inaugural season in 1894, posting a 1–1 record. The team's first win was over Idaho. The first paid head football coach was William L. Allen, who served as head coach in 1900 and 1902, posting an overall record of 6–3–1.

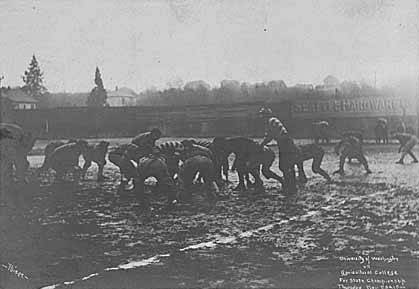
Washington Agricultural College and School of Science squares off against the University of Washington November 29, 1900, for the State Championship

John R. Bender served as head football coach from 1906 to 1907 and 1912–1914, compiling a record of 21–12. William Henry Dietz was the Cougars' head football coach from 1915 to 1917, posting a stellar 17–2–1 record. Dietz's 1915 team defeated Brown, now an FCS team, in the Rose Bowl and finished with a 7–0 record. The win is Washington State's only Rose Bowl or New Year's Six Bowl win. Dietz was inducted into the College Football Hall of Fame as a coach in 2012. Albert Exendine served as Washington State's head football coach from 1923 to 1925, posting a 6–13–4 overall record. Babe Hollingbery was the Cougars' head football coach for 17 seasons, posting a 93–53–14 (.625) record. His 93 wins are the most by any head football coach in Washington State football history. Hollingbery's 1930 team played in the Rose Bowl, a game they lost to Alabama. The Cougars didn't lose a single home game from 1926 to 1935. Among the Cougar greats Hollingbery coached were Mel Hein, Turk Edwards, and Mel Dressel. The Hollingbery Fieldhouse that serves many of Washington State's athletics teams, was named in his honor in 1963. He was inducted into the College Football Hall of Fame as a coach in 1979. Like many other college football programs, the Cougars did not field a team in 1943 or 1944, due to World War II. After the war ended, Phil Sarboe was hired away from Lincoln High School in Tacoma to return to his alma mater as the head coach. Sarboe's Cougars posted a 17–26–3 (.402) record in his five seasons.

Forest Evashevski took over as the head coach in late 1949. His 1951 team finished the season ranked No. 14 in the Coaches' Poll and No. 18 in the AP Poll. He was 11–6–2 (.632) in his two seasons in Pullman, then left for Iowa in the Big Ten Conference. Evashevski was inducted into the College Football Hall of Fame as a coach in 2000. Assistant coach Al Kircher was promoted, but didn't enjoy as much success as his predecessor, going 13–25–2 (.350) in his four seasons as head coach. He was not retained after his contract expired. Jim Sutherland was Washington State's 21st head football coach and led the program for eight seasons, through 1963, with an overall record of 37–39–4 (.488). Previously an assistant at rival Washington, Bert Clark was WSU's head coach for four seasons, posting an overall record of 15–24–1 (.388). His best season was his second in 1965, when the WSU "Cardiac Kids" went 7–3; they defeated three Big Ten teams on the road, but lost to rivals Idaho and Washington. It was Clark's only winning season, as he failed to win more than three games in the other three. Clark was not retained after the end of his fourth season. Montana State head coach Jim Sweeney was hired prior to the 1968 season led the Cougars for eight seasons, with an overall record of 26–59–1 (.308). His best season was 1972 at 7–4, which was his only winning season. Sweeney resigned shortly after the 1975 season, and was succeeded by Jackie Sherrill, the defensive coordinator at Pittsburgh, but he stayed for only one season. The Cougars were 3–8 in 1976, then Sherrill returned to Pitt as head coach. Warren Powers, an assistant from Nebraska, also stayed for just one season (1977), then returned to the Big Eight Conference as head coach at Missouri.

=== Jim Walden era (1978–1986) ===
Jim Walden was promoted to head coach following the departure of Powers. In nine seasons, Walden led the Cougars to one bowl appearance, the Holiday Bowl in 1981, a memorable loss to BYU. It was Washington State's first bowl in 51 years, since the 1931 Rose Bowl. (The Pac-8 did not allow a second bowl team until 1975.) Walden won Pacific-10 Coach of the Year honors in 1981 and 1983. Walden's final record at Washington State was 44–52–4. Players coached by Walden at WSU include Jack Thompson, Kerry Porter, Rueben Mayes, Ricky Turner, Ricky Reynolds, Paul Sorensen, Brian Forde, Lee Blakeney, Mark Rypien, Dan Lynch, Pat Beach, Keith Millard, Erik Howard, and Cedrick Brown. Walden left after the 1986 season for Iowa State in the Big Eight.

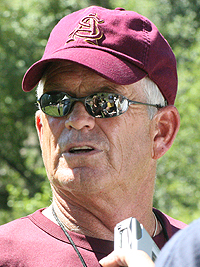
Dennis Erickson in 2007

=== Dennis Erickson era (1987–1988) ===
When hired in early 1987, 39-year-old Dennis Erickson said it was his lifelong dream to become the head football coach of the Cougars. His contract was a five-year deal at an annual base salary of $70,000, with up to $30,000 from radio, television, and speaking obligations. Erickson was previously the head coach at Wyoming for one season, preceded by four on the Palouse at neighboring Idaho.

Erickson's Cougars posted a 3–7–1 record in his first season, but improved to 9–3 in 1988, capped with a victory in the Aloha Bowl, the Cougars' first bowl victory since January 1916. Although stating publicly a week earlier that he would not leave Washington State, Erickson departed for Miami in March 1989; his overall record with the Cougars was 12–10–1 (.543).

=== Mike Price era (1989–2002) ===
Former Cougar player and assistant Mike Price returned to Pullman in 1989; he was previously the head coach for eight years at Weber State in Ogden, Utah. Price led the Cougars to unprecedented success, taking his 1997 and 2002 teams to the Rose Bowl, both times losing. The 1997 team was led by star quarterback Ryan Leaf, the second overall pick in the 1998 NFL draft by the San Diego Chargers. Those teams finished ranked No. 9 and No. 10 in the Coaches' and AP Polls, respectively. Price also led the Cougars to victories in the Copper, Alamo, and Sun Bowls, and had an overall record of 83–78 (.516) at WSU. It was during the 2002 season that Washington State received its highest ranking ever in the modern era in the AP Poll at No. 3. Price left after the Rose Bowl for Alabama, but was fired before ever coaching a game for the Crimson Tide, due to an off-the-field incident in the spring.

=== Bill Doba era (2003–2007) ===
Defensive coordinator Bill Doba was promoted to head coach following Price's departure. Things started out well in 2003, as they went 10–3 to finish ninth in both major polls. The Cougars slipped to 5–6 in 2004 and 4–7 in 2005. A 6–6 season in 2006 followed, and after finishing the 2007 season at 5–7, Doba was fired with an overall record of 30–28 (.517).

=== Paul Wulff era (2008–2011) ===
Former Cougar center Paul Wulff was hired away from Eastern Washington in Cheney to succeed Doba. Wulff struggled mightily as the WSU head coach, failing to win more than four games in a single season. His overall record at Washington State was 9–40 (.184), the lowest winning percentage of any head coach in Washington State football history, and he was fired after the 2011 season.

=== Mike Leach era (2012–2019) ===
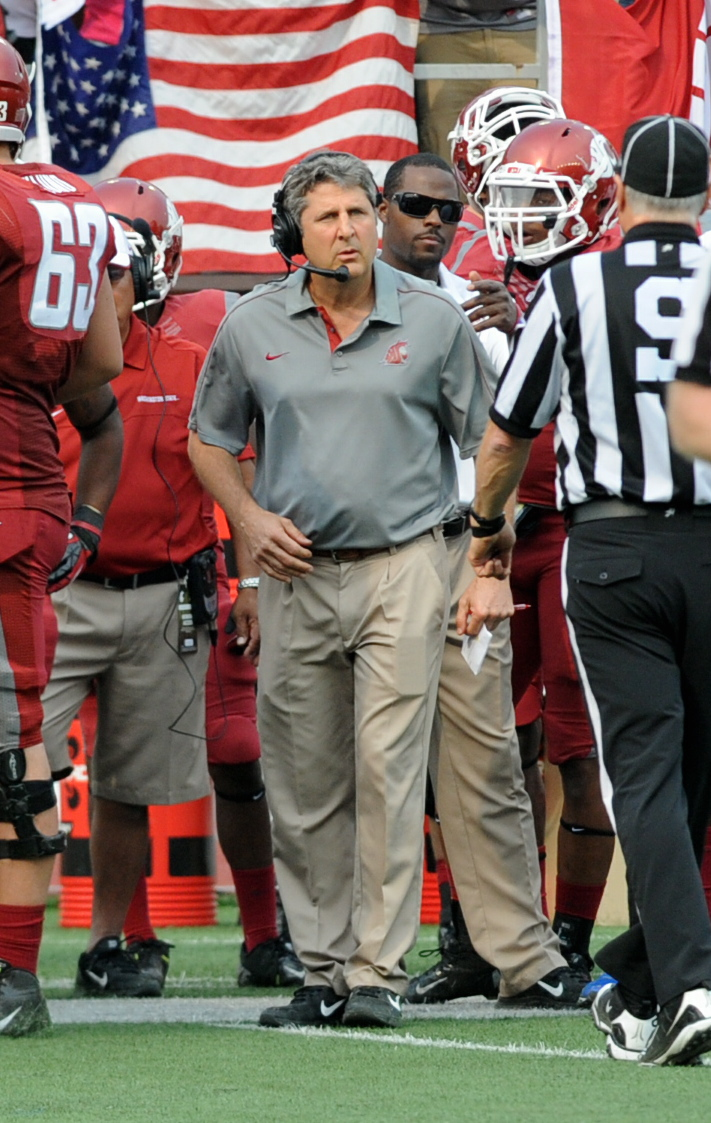
Mike Leach in 2012

In November 2011, it was announced that Mike Leach would replace Wulff as head coach. Leach had previously spent ten seasons as head coach at Texas Tech. In 2012, the new coaching staff installed an Air raid offense; an exciting, up-tempo, pass-oriented offensive attack which led the Pac-12 Conference in passing offense. In his second season in 2013, Leach led Washington State to the New Mexico Bowl, the first bowl game for the Cougars in a decade. Leach received a two-year contract extension that November, after leading the Cougars to their best record since 2006.

In 2015, Leach guided the Washington State Cougars to their first bowl victory since the 2003 season. In that same year, the team also posted a 9–4 winning season and was ranked in the AP Poll, Coach's Poll, and College Football Playoff ranking. Leach was named the Pac-12's co-Coach of the Year, as well as the Associated Press Pac-12 Coach of the Year. After the season, his contract was extended through the 2020 season.

In 2016, sandwiched between a two-game losing streak to begin and a three-game losing streak to end the season, the Cougars rode an eight-game winning streak to a place in the Holiday Bowl, but lost to Minnesota 17–12. They finished with a 7–2 Pac-12 record and overall record of 8–5 for 2016. Huge wins over Oregon and No. 15 Stanford contributed to the Cougars' best finish in Pac-12 conference play since the 2003 team went 6–2.

After the suicide of projected starting quarterback Tyler Hilinski in January 2018, graduate transfer Gardner Minshew from East Carolina was recruited by Leach to fill the void. Minshew and other veteran players, such as sixth-year linebacker Peyton Pelluer, rallied the team in honor of their former teammate Hilinski and led Washington State to a memorable season for Cougar football fans. With a 28–26 win over No. 24 Iowa State in the Alamo Bowl, Washington State won eleven games for the first time in school history and finished the season 11–2.

=== Nick Rolovich era (2020–2021) ===
After the 2019 season, Mike Leach departed Washington State to accept the head coaching job at Mississippi State. Less than a week after Leach's departure, athletic director Pat Chun announced the hire of Hawaii head coach Nick Rolovich. On October 18, 2021, he was fired for refusing to receive the COVID-19 vaccination in compliance with Washington's state employee mandate. Rolovich originally signaled that he would receive the vaccination, but decided to file for a religious exemption. Rolovich was denied the exemption and terminated. Rolovich subsequently filed a wrongful termination lawsuit against the university, Chun, and Washington Governor Jay Inslee. Rolovich lost that lawsuit on all counts as the court determined that he did not have a reasonable basis to seek a religious exemption because there was no evidence in the record that he had religious concerns before he sought the exemption and ample evidence that his concerns were solely personal and political.

=== Jake Dickert era (2021–2024) ===
Following the firing of Nick Rolovich, defensive coordinator and linebackers coach Jake Dickert was named as acting head coach. Under Dickert's leadership, the Cougars fought to a 3–2 record, including a 40–13 victory over rival Washington in the 113th Apple Cup, snapping a seven-game losing streak in the rivalry. As a result, Dickert was hired as the permanent head coach on November 27. The team concluded the 2021 season with a record of 7–5, with a 6–3 mark in-conference, good for a second-place finish in the Pac-12 North. The team lost to the Central Michigan Chippewas in the Sun Bowl 24–21. The following season in 2022 would result in the same overall record of 7–5 but worse in conference play at 4–5. The Cougars would get an invite to the LA Bowl where they would lose to the 9–4 Fresno State Bulldogs 29–6 leaving them with a final record of 7–6 for the 2022 season. The 2023–24 season would be the Cougars last in the Pac-12 Conference, which lost ten members and is rebuilding. While they started out 4–0, the 2023–24 season ended up being a step back in terms of success with them going 5–7 and missing out on getting an invite to a bowl game. They finished with an in-conference record of only 2–7. Due to both Washington State and Oregon State being the only two schools left in the Pac-12 for the 2024 season, both schools have agreed upon a football scheduling alliance with the Mountain West Conference (MWC). During his time at Washington State, Dickert was able to get the Cougars to reach three bowl games within a span of four years. Jake Dickert was hired by Wake Forest to take over that school's football program in December 2024 just days prior to the Cougars playing in the 2024 Holiday Bowl.

=== Jimmy Rogers era (2025) ===
On December 28, 2024, Jimmy Rogers, formerly at South Dakota State University, became the 35th head coach at Washington State University, accepting a five-year contract at $1.57 million annually. On December 5, 2025, Rogers was announced as the head coach of the Iowa State University after finishing only one season at Washington State with a 6–6 record.

=== Kirby Moore era (2026) ===
In December 2025, Washington State University hired Kirby Moore as its 36th head football coach, giving the Cougars a young offensive-minded coach with strong regional ties. He made his WSU head-coaching debut in the 2026 Apple Cup, a 24–10 loss to Washington in Seattle.

== Conference affiliations ==
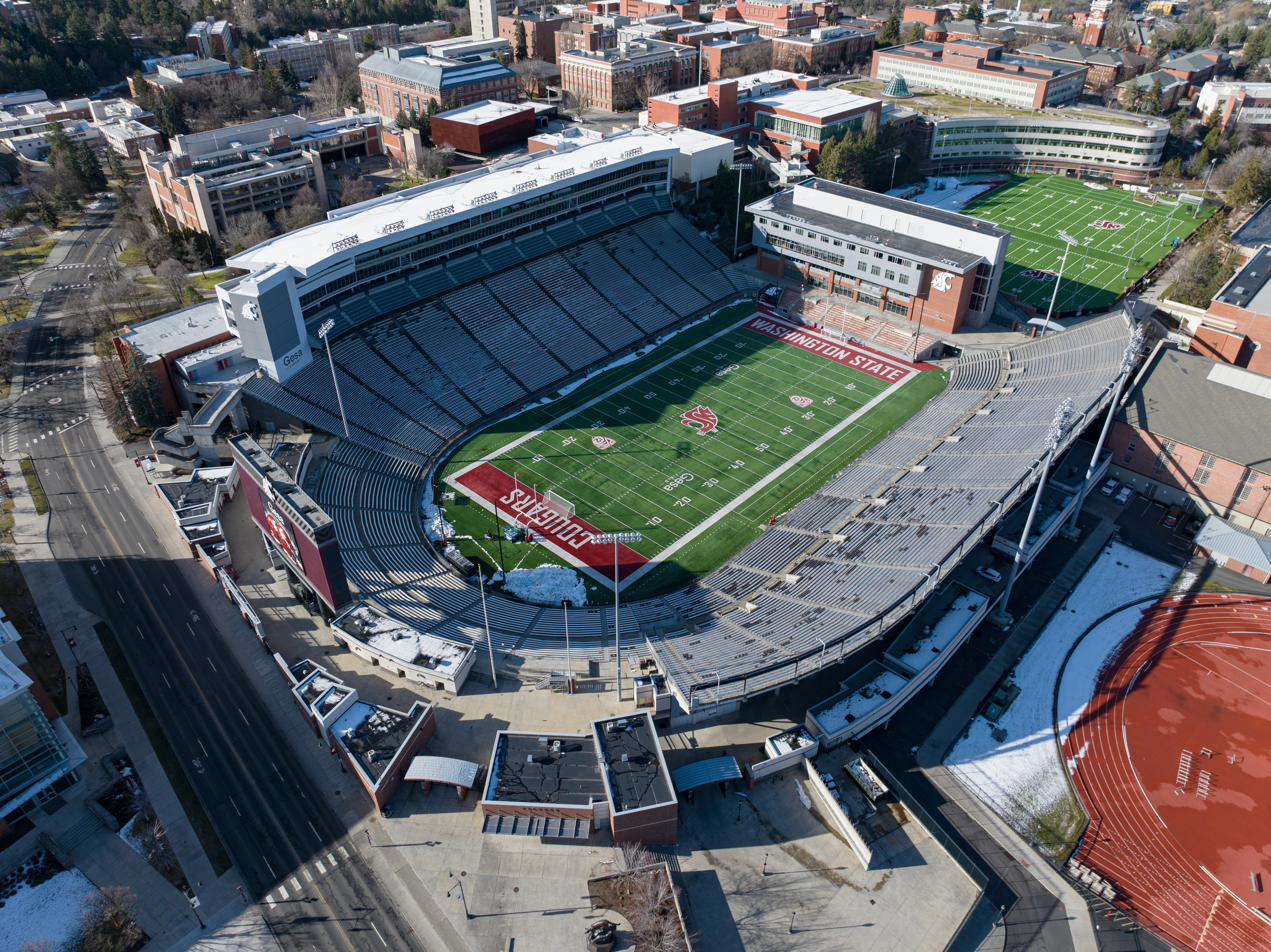
Aerial view of Martin Stadium from the northeast, taken in March 2024

Washington State has been a member of the following conferences.

- Independent (1894–1916)
- Pacific Coast Conference (1917, 1919–1958)
- Independent (1918)
- Independent (1959–1961)
- Pac-12 Conference (1962–present)
  - Athletic Association of Western Universities (1962–1967)
  - Pacific-8 Conference (1968–1977)
  - Pacific-10 Conference (1978–2010)
  - Pac-12 Conference (2011–present)

== Championships ==
=== Rose Bowl championship and national championship ===
The NCAA does not recognize any Washington State team as national champions. The university does not claim any national titles for football. Washington State has won 1 Rose Bowl dating back to 1916.

The 1915 WSC team was unbeaten and untied and gave up only 10 points on the season. They were invited to the Tournament East-West football game, now known as the 1916 Rose Bowl, where they defeated Brown University, now an FCS team, 14–0. This was the second Rose Bowl game, after the original in 1902, and the first in the now annual continuous series. The win is Washington State's only Rose Bowl or New Year's Six Bowl win.

There was no contemporary system for determining a national champion in the early years of college football. NCAA-designated major selectors have retroactively variously named Cornell, Minnesota, Oklahoma, and Pittsburgh champions or co-champions for the 1915 college football season.

Rose Bowl referee Walter Eckersall, who also officiated a Cornell game that season, was quoted as saying "[WSC] is the equal of Cornell. There is not a better football team in the country." The Associated Press referred to the 1915 WSC team as "mythical national champions" when members of the team returned to Pullman for a 20th anniversary celebration in 1935. In 2014, Washington State Senate Resolution 8715 recognized the team as national champions on the season's 99th anniversary. The senate resolution was adopted with WSU head football coach Mike Leach in attendance.

Year	Coach	Selector	Record	Bowl	Opponent	Result
1915	William "Lone Star" Dietz	Washington State Senate (Note: Not an NCAA-designated major selector.)	7–0	Rose Bowl	Brown	W 14–0

=== Conference championships ===
Washington State has won four conference championships, two shared and two outright.

Season	Conference	Coach	Record	Overall
1917	Pacific Coast Conference	William Dietz	3–0	6–0–1
1930	Pacific Coast Conference	Babe Hollingbery	6–1	9–1
1997†	Pacific-10 Conference	Mike Price	7–1	10–2
2002†	Pacific-10 Conference	Mike Price	7–1	10–3

† co-champions

=== Division championships ===
Season	Division	Coach	Opponent	CG result
2018^	Pac-12 North	Mike Leach	N/A – lost tiebreaker to Washington	

^ Co-championship

== Bowl games ==
Washington State has made 20 bowl appearances, with a record of 9–11 through the 2025 season. The Cougars have played in four Rose Bowls (1 win, 3 losses), three Holiday Bowls (1 win, 3 losses), the Sun Bowl (2 wins), Alamo Bowl (2 wins), Aloha Bowl (1 win), Copper Bowl (1 win), New Mexico Bowl (1 loss), Famous Idaho Potato Bowl (1 win), and LA Bowl (1 loss). Prior to the 1975 season, the Pac-8 allowed only bowl team, to the Rose Bowl.

From 2015 through 2019, the Cougars made five consecutive bowl appearances for the first time in program history, all under head coach Mike Leach.

No.	Season	Coach	Bowl	Opponent	Result
1	1915	William Dietz	Rose	Brown	W 14–0
2	1930	Babe Hollingbery	Rose	Alabama	L 0–24
3	1981	Jim Walden	Holiday	BYU	L 36–38
4	1988	Dennis Erickson	Aloha	Houston	W 24–22
5	1992	Mike Price	Copper	Utah	W 31–28
6	1994	Mike Price	Alamo	Baylor	W 10–3
7	1997	Mike Price	Rose	Michigan	L 16–21
8	2001	Mike Price	Sun	Purdue	W 33–27
9	2002	Mike Price	Rose	Oklahoma	L 14–34
10	2003	Bill Doba	Holiday	Texas	W 28–20
11	2013	Mike Leach	New Mexico	Colorado State	L 45–48
12	2015	Mike Leach	Sun	Miami (FL)	W 20–14
13	2016	Mike Leach	Holiday	Minnesota	L 12–17
14	2017	Mike Leach	Holiday	Michigan State	L 17–42
15	2018	Mike Leach	Alamo	Iowa State	W 28–26
16	2019	Mike Leach	Cheez-It	Air Force	L 21–31
17	2021	Jake Dickert	Sun	Central Michigan	L 21–24
18	2022	Jake Dickert	LA	Fresno State	L 6–29
19	2024	Pete Kaligis (interim)	Holiday	Syracuse	L 35–52
20	2025	Jesse Bobbit (interim)	Famous Idaho Potato	Utah State	W 34–21

== Head coaches ==
Seasons	Coach	Years	Record	Pct.
1894	William Goodyear	1	1–1	.500
1895	Fred Waite	1	2–0	1.000
1896	David Brodie	1	2–0–1	1.000
1897	Robert Gailey	1	2–0	1.000
1898–99	Frank Shively	2	1–1–1	.500
1900, 1902	William Allen	2	6–3–1	.650
1901	William Namack	1	4–1	.800
1903	James Ashmore	1	3–3–2	.500
1904–1905	Everett Sweeley	2	6–6	.500
1906–1907, 1912–1914	John Bender	5	21–12	.636
1908	Walter Rheinschild	1	4–0–2	.833
1909	Willis Kienholz	1	4–1	.800
1910–1911	Oscar Osthoff	2	5–6	.454
1915–1917	William Dietz	3	17–2–1	.875
1918	Emory Alvord	1	1–1	.500
1919–1922	Gus Welch	4	16–10–1	.611
1923–1925	Albert Exendine	3	6–13–4	.348
1926–1942	Babe Hollingbery	15	93–53–14	.625
1943–1944	World War II – no teams			
1945–1949	Phil Sarboe	5	17–26–3	.402
1950–1951	Forest Evashevski	2	11–6–2	.632
1952–1955	Al Kircher	4	13–25–2	.350
1956–1963	Jim Sutherland	8	37–39–4	.488
1964–1967	Bert Clark	4	15–24–1	.388
1968–1975	Jim Sweeney	8	26–59–1	.308
1976	Jackie Sherrill	1	3–8	.273
1977	Warren Powers	1	6–5	.545
1978–1986	Jim Walden	9	44–52–4	.460
1987–1988	Dennis Erickson	2	12–10–1	.543
1989–2002	Mike Price	14	83–78	.516
2003–2007	Bill Doba	5	30–29	.508
2008–2011	Paul Wulff	4	9–40	.184
2012–2019	Mike Leach	8	55–47	.539
2020–2021	Nick Rolovich	2	5–6	.455
2021–2024	Jake Dickert	4	23–20	.535
2025	Jimmy Rogers	1	6–6	.500
2026	Kirby Moore	1	0-1	–

== Rivalries ==
=== Washington ===
Washington State has had a rivalry with Washington since first playing 126 years ago in 1900. The series is 78–35–6 (.681) in favor of Washington, with the Huskies taking the most recent game in 2025. The teams played for the "Governor's Trophy" from 1934 to 1961. The game was renamed the Apple Cup in 1962 because of Washington's national reputation as a major producer of apples. While the game was commonly played on the weekend after Thanksgiving, now that the two teams are in different conferences, the game will be played during the early, non-conference portion of the college football season. The Apple Cup is currently slated to continue until 2028.

=== Idaho ===
The two land-grant universities are less than eight miles (13 km) apart on the rural Palouse in the Inland Northwest; the University of Idaho campus in Moscow is nearly on the Idaho–Washington border, and Washington State's campus is directly west, on the east side of Pullman, linked by Washington State Route 270 and the Bill Chipman Palouse Trail. The first game was played 132 years ago in November 1894 and resulted in a win for Washington State. The series has been played intermittently since 1978, It was revived as an annual game for a full decade (1998–2007) and the Cougars won eight of the ten. Idaho returned to lower-level FCS play in 2018 but the teams continue to schedule games. Washington State leads the series 74–19-3 against the Vandals.

=== Oregon State ===
The rivalry with Washington State started in 1895 when Cougars defeated the Beavers 41–35. It is one of the top 40 most played rivalries in NCAA Division I FBS history. The two rivals have meet 111 times as of 2025. The rivalry between the two bordering state schools has intensified as the two schools were the only ones left after 10 schools left the Pac-12 conference. The Cougars have led the series 58–51–3 and lost the most recent matchup with a score of 30–48. The Beavers largest margin of victory was 66–13 in 2008, while the Cougars largest margin of victory was 55–7 in 1991. Oregon State's longest win streak against the Cougars is 6 straight from 1966 to 1971, while Washington State's longest against the Beavers is 10 straight from 1983 to 1993. The rivalry has not been officially named yet with some of the many suggestions being "The Land-Grant Rivalry", "The Cascade Cup" "The Columbia River Rivalry".

=== Northwest Championship ===
Washington State won the 1917, 1951, 1958, 1972, 1973, and 1983 Northwest Championships by sweeping rivals Washington, Oregon State and Oregon.

== All-time record vs. Pac-12 teams ==
Official record (including any NCAA imposed vacates and forfeits) against all current Pac-12 opponents as of the completion of the 2025 season.

Opponent	Won	Lost	Ties	Percentage	Streak	First	Last
Boise State	5	2	0	.714	Lost 1	1997	2024
Colorado State	3	1	0	.750	Lost 1	2013	2025
Fresno State	4	2	0	.667	Won 1	1987	2024
Oregon State	58	50	3	.536	Won 1	1903	2025
San Diego State	3	1	0	.750	Won 2	2007	2025
Texas State	0	0	0	–	N/A	N/A	N/A
Utah State	4	2	0	.667	Won 2	1949	2025
Totals	77	58	3	.570			

== Individual accomplishments ==
=== Heisman Trophy voting ===
Eight Cougars have finished in the Top 10 of the Heisman Trophy voting. Ryan Leaf had the highest finish in the Heisman balloting in program history, at third in 1997.

Season	Name	Position	Place
1978	Jack Thompson	QB	9th
1984	Rueben Mayes	RB	10th
1988	Timm Rosenbach	QB	7th
1992	Drew Bledsoe	QB	8th
1997	Ryan Leaf	QB	3rd
2002	Jason Gesser	QB	7th
2005	Jerome Harrison	RB	9th
2018	Gardner Minshew	QB	5th

=== Consensus All-America selections ===
There have been seven Washington State players named consensus All-Americans through the 2017 season. Cody O'Connell was named twice, making the all-time school total eight. Both Jason Hanson (1989) and Cody O'Connell (2016) were unanimous selections. Additionally, Washington State has had 39 first team All-America selections through the 2017 season.

Player	Position	Seasons	Selections
Rueben Mayes	RB	1982–1985	1984
Mike Utley	G	1985–1988	1988
Jason Hanson	K	1988–1991	1989^
Rien Long	T	2000–2002	2002
Jerome Harrison	RB	2004–2005	2005
Cody O'Connell	OT	2013–2017	2016^, 2017
Hercules Mata'afa	DE	2015–2017	2017

^ Unanimous selection

=== College Football Hall of Fame ===
Five players and three coaches from the program have been inducted into the College Football Hall of Fame.

Player	Position	Seasons	Inducted	Ref.
Mel Hein	C	1929–1931	1954	
Turk Edwards	T	1929–1931	1975	
Babe Hollingbery	Coach	1926–1942	1979	
Rueben Mayes	RB	1982–1985	2008	
William Dietz	Coach	1915–1917	2012	
Mike Utley	G	1985–1988	2016	
Dennis Erickson	Coach	1987–1988	2019	
Jason Hanson	K	1988–1991	2020	

=== Pro Football Hall of Fame ===
Two Cougars have been inducted into the Pro Football Hall of Fame.

Player	Position	Seasons	NFL team	NFL Years	Inducted
Mel Hein	C	1927–1931	New York Giants	1931–1945	1963
Turk Edwards	T	1929–1931	Washington Redskins	1932–1940	1969

=== Canadian Football Hall of Fame ===
Four Cougars have been inducted into the Canadian Football Hall of Fame.

Player	Position	Seasons	CFL Team(s)	CFL Years	Inducted	Ref.
Byron Bailey	RB	1949–1951	B.C. Lions	1954–1964	1975	
George Reed	RB	1959–1962	Saskatchewan Roughriders	1963–1975	1979	
Brian Kelly	WR, coach	1975–1977	Edmonton Eskimos	1979–1987	1991	
Hugh Campbell	WR, coach, executive	1959–1962	Edmonton Eskimos, Saskatchewan Roughriders	1964–2006	2000	

=== Retired numbers ===
The Cougars have officially retired two numbers.

Washington State Cougars retired numbers
No.	Player	Pos.	Tenure	Ref.
7	Mel Hein	C	1927–1931	
14	Jack Thompson	QB	1974–1978	

==== Special cases ====
Those numbers are not officially retired, but have not been reissued to any player either.

No.	Player	Position	Career	Ref.
11	Drew Bledsoe	QB	1990–92	
16	Ryan Leaf	QB	1994–97	
91	Leon Bender (Note: Posthumously. Bender was found dead only six weeks after being drafted by the Oakland Raiders. He was 22 years old.)	DT	1994–1997	

=== FWAA Eddie Robinson Coach of the Year Award ===
The Eddie Robinson Coach of the Year Award is given annually to a college football coach by the Football Writers Association of America (FWAA). Mike Price is the first and only coach in the Washington State football program history to have received this distinguished award.

Year	Coach	Record
1997	Mike Price	10–2

=== AFCA National Coach of the Year ===
The AFCA Coach of the Year Award is given annually to a college football coach by the American Football Coaches Association (AFCA). Mike Leach is the first and only coach in the Washington State football program history to have received this distinguished award.

Year	Coach	Record
2018	Mike Leach	11–2

=== Pac-12 Coach of the Year ===
Five Washington State football head coaches have received the annual award a total of eight times as the conference's Coach of the Year.

Season	Coach	Record
1981	Jim Walden	8–3–1
1983	Jim Walden	7–4
1988^	Dennis Erickson	9–3
1997	Mike Price	10–2
2001	Mike Price	10–2
2003^	Bill Doba	10–3
2015^	Mike Leach	9–4
2018	Mike Leach	11–2

^ Shared honor

== Cougars in the NFL ==
=== Active NFL ===
Updated April 2026.

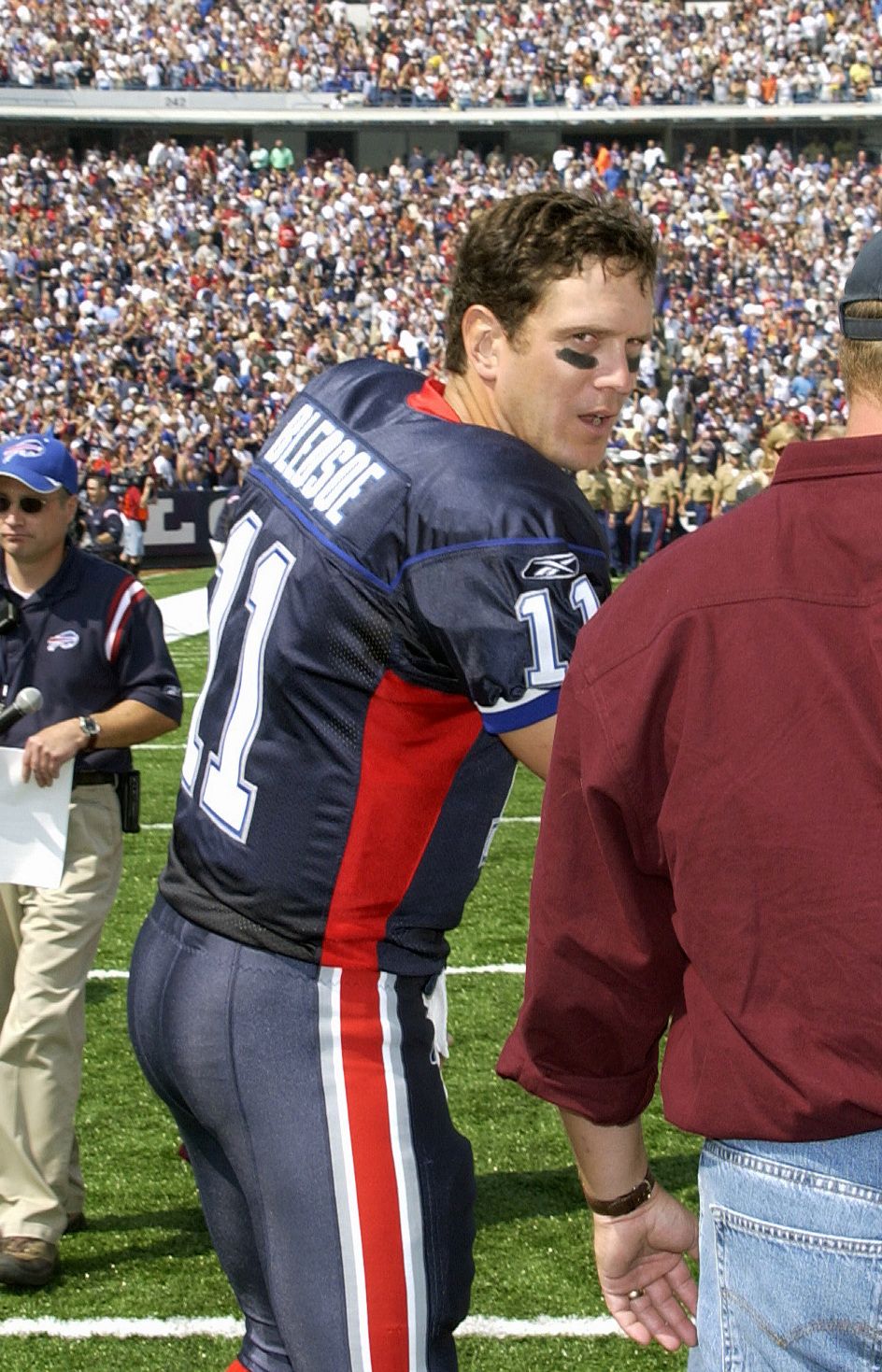
Drew Bledsoe, New England Patriots Hall of Fame

Player	NFL team
Gardner Minshew	Arizona Cardinals
Chau Smith-Wade	Carolina Panthers
Jalen Thompson	Dallas Cowboys
Jack Wilson	Indianapolis Colts
Jaden Hicks	Kansas City Chiefs
Esa Pole	Kansas City Chiefs
Daiyan Henley	Los Angeles Chargers
Cam Lampkin	Los Angeles Rams
Jaylen Watson	Los Angeles Rams
Brennan Jackson	Las Vegas Raiders
Kyle Williams	New England Patriots
Abraham Lucas	Seattle Seahawks
Frankie Luvu	Washington Commanders

== Future Non-conference opponents ==
Announced schedules as of May 18, 2026.

2027	2028	2029	2030	2031	2032
Washington	UC Davis	Idaho	North Texas	at San Jose State	at Texas Tech
Idaho	at Kansas	Kansas State	Eastern Washington	Virginia	
Kansas	at Washington			at Toledo	
at Arizona					
