= Babe Hollingbery =

American football coach

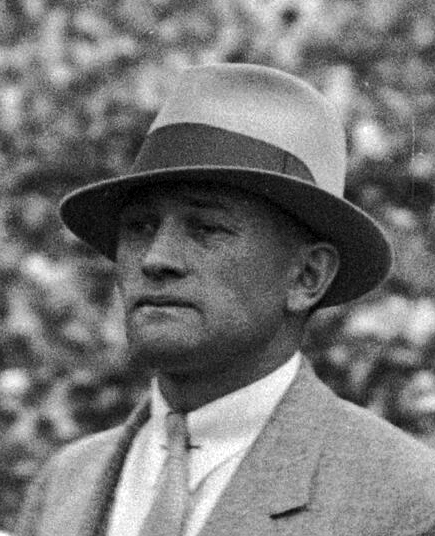

Biographical details
- Born: July 15, 1893; Hollister, California, U.S.
- Died: January 12, 1974 (aged 80); Yakima, Washington, U.S.

Coaching career (HC unless noted)
- 1926–1942: Washington State
- 1943: Spokane Air Service (advisory)

Head coaching record
- Overall: 93–53–14
- Bowls: 0–1

Accomplishments and honors

Championships
- 1 PCC (1930)
- College Football Hall of Fame; Inducted in 1979 (profile)

Orin Ercel "Babe" Hollingbery (July 15, 1893 – January 12, 1974) was an American football coach. He served as the head football coach at the State College of Washington—now known as Washington State University—for 17 seasons, from 1926 to 1942, and compiled a record of 93–53–14 (.625). Hollingbery's 93 wins are the most by any head coach in the history of the Washington State Cougars football program. He was inducted into the College Football Hall of Fame in 1979.

== Early years ==
Born in Hollister, California, Hollingbery was raised in San Francisco and never attended college. He coached local high school football, even leading three teams one fall, and later coached at the Olympic Club. One of his players at Olympic was Buck Bailey, who became his line coach at Washington State in 1926 and headed the Cougar baseball program until 1961.

== Washington State ==
Hollingbery coached at Washington State during what is generally agreed as its greatest football era. The Cougars did not lose a home game from 1926 to 1935, and the 1930 team won the Pacific Coast Conference (PCC) title and advanced to the Rose Bowl against Alabama. He coached some of the greatest names in Washington State history, including Turk Edwards, Mel Hein, Mel Dressel, Dale Gentry, Ed Goddard, Harold Ahlskog, Elmer Schwartz, Bob Kennedy, Nick Suseoff, Bill Sewell, John Bley, and Herbert "Butch" Meeker.

Before the 1943 season, the football program went on hiatus due to World War II; Hollingbery trained U.S. Army troops on campus and coached eighth-grade football. He was also an advisory coach for the 1943 Spokane Air Service Commandos football team.

Hollingbery took a one-year leave of absence, beginning in mid-1944, moved to Yakima, and started a lucrative hop-growing business. When the Cougar football program was restarted, Hollingberry was asked to take a pay cut and did not return to Pullman.

Hollingbery Fieldhouse at Washington State University, a facility serving many different sports, was built in 1929 and renamed for the coach in 1963; the dedication ceremony was at halftime of the Battle of the Palouse football game with Idaho on November 2. Hired after three consecutive Cougar losses to Idaho, Hollingberry never lost to the Vandals, with 16 wins and a tie (.971).

== East-West Shrine Game ==
Hollingbery also was the creator of the East–West Shrine Game and the head coach of the West team in the first Shrine Game in 1925. He coached in a total of 18 Shrine Games, leading players such as Harold Muller, Rags Matthews, and George Sauer.

== Northwest League ==
Involved in minor league baseball in Yakima, Hollingbery was the president of the new Northwest League for the 1955 season. Hired in June after the resignation of Arthur Pohlman, Hollingbery stepped down that November.

== Death ==
In late December 1973, Hollingbery suffered a stroke, fell into a coma, and died several weeks later at age 80. His wife, Hazel, died eleven years later, days before her 91st birthday; they are buried at Terrace Heights Memorial Park in Yakima.

== Head coaching record ==
Year	Team	Overall	Conference	Standing	Bowl/playoffs	AP^{#}
Washington State Cougars (Pacific Coast Conference) (1926–1942)
1926	Washington State	6–1	4–1	T–3rd		
1927	Washington State	3–3–2	1–3–1	7th		
1928	Washington State	7–3	4–3	4th		
1929	Washington State	10–2	4–2	5th		
1930	Washington State	9–1	6–1	1st	L Rose	
1931	Washington State	6–4	4–3	4th		
1932	Washington State	7–1–1	5–1–1	2nd		
1933	Washington State	5–3–1	3–3–1	T–5th		
1934	Washington State	4–3–1	4–0–1	2nd		
1935	Washington State	5–3–1	3–2	T–4th		
1936	Washington State	6–3–1	6–2–1	2nd		
1937	Washington State	3–3–3	3–3–2	T–4th		
1938	Washington State	2–8	1–7	9th		
1939	Washington State	4–5	3–5	6th		
1940	Washington State	4–4–2	3–4–2	4th		
1941	Washington State	6–4	5–3	T–2nd		19
1942	Washington State	6–2–2	5–1–1	2nd		17
Washington State:		93–53–14	64–42–10			
Total:		93–53–14				
National championship Conference title Conference division title or championship game berth
^{#}Rankings from final AP poll.
