= Mel Hein =

American football player and coach (1909–1992)

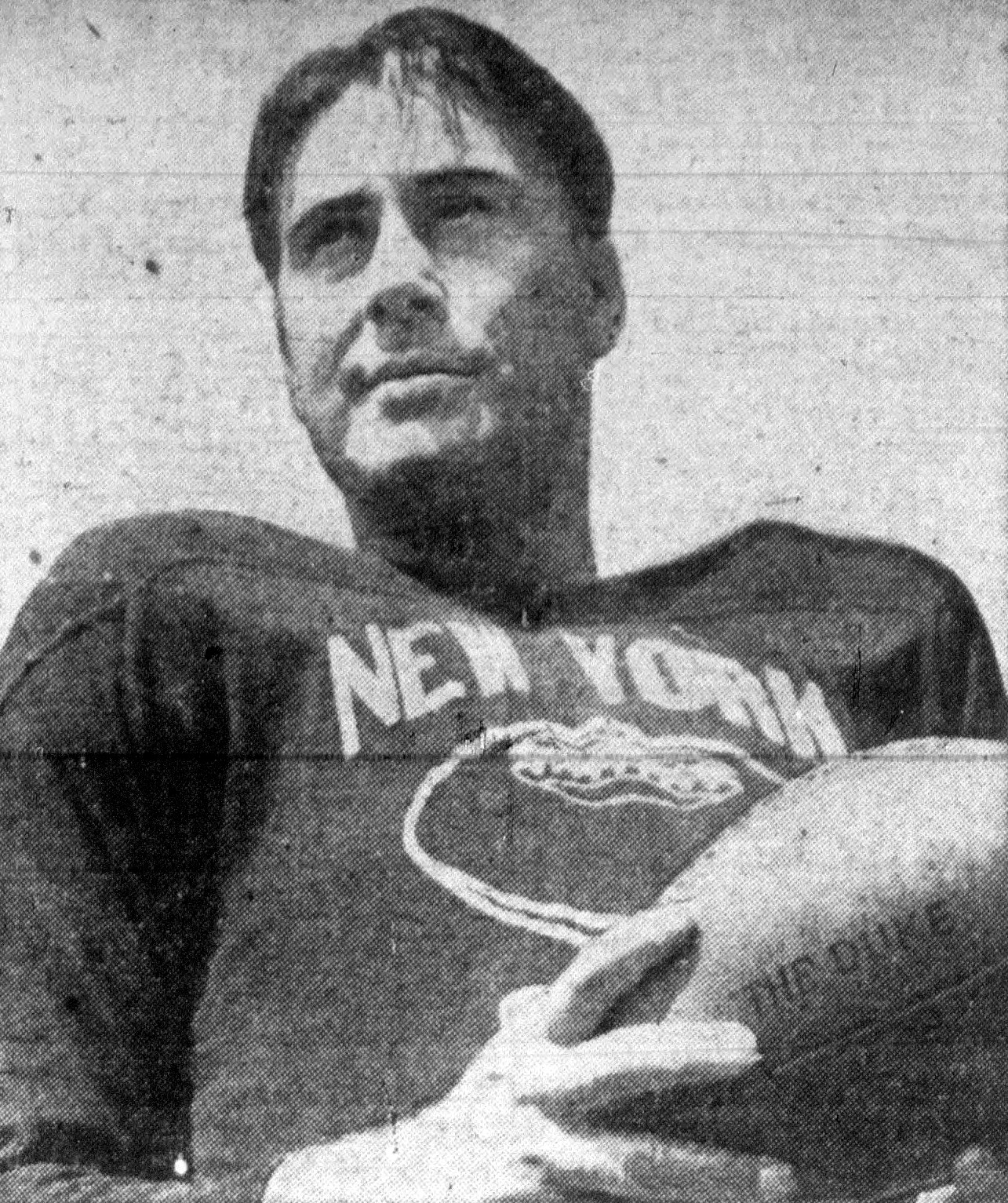
- Hein c. 1942

No. 7
- Positions: Center, linebacker

Personal information
- Born: August 22, 1909; Redding, California, U.S.
- Died: January 31, 1992 (aged 82); San Clemente, California, U.S.
- Listed height: 6 ft 2 in (1.88 m)
- Listed weight: 225 lb (102 kg)

Career information
- High school: Burlington (Burlington, Washington)
- College: Washington State (1928–1930)

Career history

Playing
- New York Giants (1931–1945)

Coaching
- Union (NY) (1943–1946) Head coach; Los Angeles Dons (1947) Head coach & assistant coach; Los Angeles Dons (1948) Assistant coach; New York Yankees (1949) Assistant coach; Los Angeles Rams (1950) Assistant coach; USC (1951–1965) Assistant coach

Awards and highlights
- As a player: 2× NFL champion (1934, 1938); NFL Most Valuable Player (1938); 8× First-team All-Pro (1933–1940); 4× NFL All-Star Game (1938–1941); NFL 1930s All-Decade Team; NFL 75th Anniversary All-Time Team; NFL 100th Anniversary All-Time Team; New York Giants Ring of Honor; New York Giants No. 7 retired; 3rd greatest New York Giant of all-time; First-team All-American (1930); First-team All-PCC (1930); Washington State Cougars No. 7 retired; Washington State University Hall of Fame; As a coach: National champion (1962)

Career statistics
- Games played: 170
- Games started: 153
- Interceptions: 10
- Interception yards: 78
- Fumble recoveries: 1
- Defensive touchdowns: 1
- Stats at Pro Football Reference

Head coaching record
- Career: AAFC: 2–1 (.667)
- Coaching profile at Pro Football Reference
- Pro Football Hall of Fame
- College Football Hall of Fame

Melvin Jack Hein (August 22, 1909 – January 31, 1992), nicknamed "Old Indestructible", was an American professional football player. In the era of one-platoon football, he played as a center (then a position on both offense and defense) and was inducted into the College Football Hall of Fame in 1954 and the Pro Football Hall of Fame in 1963 as part of the first class of inductees. He was also named to the National Football League (NFL) 75th, and 100th Anniversary All-Time Teams.

Hein played college football as a center for the Washington State Cougars from 1928 to 1930, leading the 1930 team to the 1931 Rose Bowl after an undefeated regular season. He received first-team All-Pacific Coast and All-American honors.

Hein next played fifteen seasons in the NFL for the New York Giants from 1931 to 1945. He was selected as a first-team All-Pro for eight consecutive years from 1933 to 1940 and won the Joe F. Carr Trophy as the NFL's Most Valuable Player in 1938. He was the starting center on NFL championship teams in 1934 and 1938 and played in seven NFL championship games (1933–1935, 1938–1939, 1941, and 1944).

Hein also served as the head football coach at Union College from 1943 to 1946 and as an assistant coach for the Los Angeles Dons of the All-America Football Conference (AAFC) from 1947 to 1948, the New York Yankees of the AAFC in 1949, the Los Angeles Rams in 1950, and the USC Trojans from 1951 to 1965. He was also the supervisor of officials for the American Football League (AFL) from 1966 to 1969 and for the American Football Conference (AFC) from 1970 to 1974.

== Early life ==
Hein was born in 1909 at Redding in Shasta County, California. His father, Herman Hein (1886–1940), was a California native of German and Dutch ancestry who worked as an electrician for a power house operator. His mother, Charlotte Hein (1887–1967), was a California native of English and German ancestry. As of 1910, the family was living at Round Mountain, about 30 miles northeast of Redding.

By 1920, the family was living in Glacier in Whatcom County, Washington, where Hein's father was working as a lineman on transmission lines. Hein had an older brother, Lloyd, and two younger brothers, Homer and Clayton. The family later moved to Fairhaven and Burlington, where Hein's father worked as an insurance agent and where Hein attended both Fairhaven and Burlington High Schools. He also played basketball as a center at Burlington High.

== College career ==
In 1927, Hein enrolled at Washington State College in Pullman joined Sigma Nu fraternity and played center for the Cougars from 1928 to 1930. With Hein as the starting center, the Cougars compiled a 10–2 record in 1929 and 9–1 in 1930. The 1930 team won the Pacific Coast Conference championship and were undefeated in the regular season, but fell to Alabama in the Rose Bowl. Hein played all sixty minutes of the Cougars' victories over California and USC on October 4 and 11.

At the end of his senior year, Hein was selected by the Associated Press and United Press as the first-team center on the All-Pacific Coast team. He was also selected by the Central Press as the first-team center, and by the All-America Board in a tie for the first-team center position, on the All-American team.

While at Washington State, Hein also played for three years (freshman, sophomore, and junior years) on the basketball team and for one year on the Cougars track team as a freshman.

== Professional career ==
In 1931, Hein signed a contract with the New York Giants, married his college sweetheart, and packed all of their belongings into a 1929 Ford and drove from Pullman to New York.

Hein on the cover of a Giants program from 1937.

Hein played for 15 years as a center and a defensive lineman. Hein was a first-team All-Pro center eight straight years from 1933 to 1940. He was also selected as the NFL's most valuable player in 1938 which he is still the only offensive lineman to ever win the award. He was the starting center on two NFL championship teams — in 1934 (NYG 30, Chicago 13) and again in 1938 (NYG 23, Green Bay 17). Hein was also a member of five Giants teams that lost NFL championship games — 1933, 1935, 1939, 1941, and 1944.

Hein had planned to retire after a dozen years in the NFL and become the head coach at Union College in Schenectady, New York. When Union's program went on hiatus due to World War II, Hein returned to the Giants on weekends for three more seasons and retired after the 1945 season.

== Coaching and administrative career ==
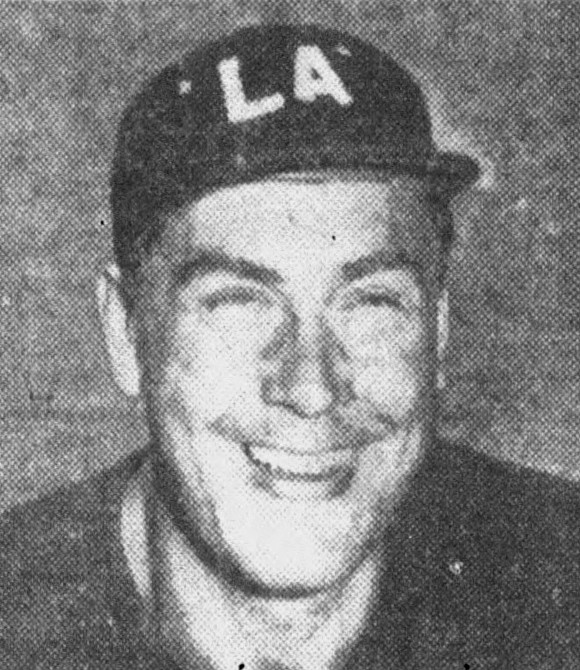
Hein, circa 1947

Hein worked as a football coach and league administrator for more than 30 years. He began coaching in 1943 as the head football coach at Union College in Schenectady, New York. For the next three years, he held that position, though the 1943 and 1945 Union College teams had their seasons cancelled due to the disruption of losing many players to World War II. In 1944, the team compiled an 0–5 record, as Hein coached the team on Saturdays and played for the Giants on Sundays. In 1946, Hein continued as Union College's head coach after retiring from the Giants. He led the 1946 team to a 3–5 record.

In March 1947, Hein was hired as an assistant coach with the Los Angeles Dons of the All-America Football Conference (AAFC). He served initially under head coach Dudley DeGroot on the 1947 Dons team. However, on November 18, 1947, DeGroot was fired as head coach, and assistant coaches Hein and Ted Shipkey were appointed as co-coaches to lead the team for the final three games of the season. The 1947 Dons compiled a 5–6 record under DeGroot and a 2–1 record under Hein and Shipkey. Hein resumed his position as an assistant coach under Jimmy Phelan on the 1948 Dons team that again compiled a 7–7 record.

After two years with the Dons, Hein was hired in February 1949 as an assistant coach for the New York Yankees of the AAFC under head coach Red Strader. The 1949 Yankees compiled an 8–4 record and finished in second place in the AAFC. The Yankees' forward wall, which was coached by Hein, was rated as the toughest in the AAFC.

Hein returned to Los Angeles in 1950 as the line coach for the Los Angeles Rams. Under head coach Joe Stydahar, the 1950 Rams won the NFL National Conference championship with a 9–3 record but lost to the Cleveland Browns in the 1950 NFL Championship Game.

Hein left the Rams in February 1951 to join the USC Trojans football team as its line coach under head coach Jess Hill. Hein remained with the Trojans for 15 years through the 1965 season. During his tenure with the program, the Trojans won a national championship (1962) and four conference championships (1952, 1959 [co-championship], 1962, and 1964 [co-championship]).

In June 1966, Hein was hired by commissioner Al Davis as the supervisor of officials for the American Football League. He remained in that position from 1966 to 1969 and continued thereafter as the supervisor of officials for the American Football Conference from 1970 to 1974. He retired in May 1974 after more than 45 years in college and professional football.

== Honors ==
Hein received numerous honors for his accomplishments as a football player. His honors include the following:

- In 1954, Hein was inducted into the National Football Foundation's Hall of Fame (later renamed the College Football Hall of Fame) as part of the fourth class of inductees.
- In 1960, he was inducted into the Helms Athletic Foundation's Football Hall of Fame.
- In 1961, he was inducted into the Washington Sports Hall of Fame. That same year, he also became the first athlete to receive Washington State's Distinguished Alumnus Award.
- In 1963, he was one of the 17 players, coaches, and founders who were inducted into the Pro Football Hall of Fame as part of the charter class.
- In 1969, as part of the NFL's 50th anniversary, the Pro Football Hall of Fame selected all-decade teams for each of the league's first five decades. Hein was selected as a center on the NFL 1930s All-Decade Team. He was also named to the NFL 50th Anniversary All-Time Team.
- Also in 1969, he was selected by the Football Writers Association of America as the center on the 11-member modern all-time college football team.
- In 1979, he was inducted as a charter member into the Washington State University Athletic Hall of Fame.
- In 1999, he was named as one of two centers on the NFL 75th Anniversary All-Time Team.
- Also in 1999, he was one of three centers named to the Walter Camp Football Foundation's All-Century Team for college players.
- In 1999, he was also ranked 74th on The Sporting News' list of the 100 Greatest Football Players.
- In 2010, the NFL Network ranked Hein 96th on its list of the 100 greatest players of all time.
- Hein's jersey number 7 was retired by both the Washington State Cougars and New York Giants.

== Family and later years ==
Hein was married in August 1931 to Florence Emma Porter of Pullman, Washington. They had two children, Sharen Lynn, born c. 1939, and Mel Hein Jr. (1941–2020). Mel Jr. competed for the USC Trojans track and field team and once held the United States indoor record in the pole vault in the 1960s.

In his later years, Hein lived in San Clemente, California. By 1991, Hein was suffering from stomach cancer, and his weight dropped from 225 to 130 pounds. Hein died of stomach cancer in 1992 at age 82 at his home in San Clemente.
