= 1930 San Francisco Gray Fog football team =

American college football season

1930 San Francisco Gray Fog football
- Conference: Independent
- Record: 6–3
- Head coach: Jimmy Needles (7th season)
- Home stadium: Kezar Stadium

1930 Western college football independents records
| | Conf. | | | Overall |
| Team | W | L | T | W | | L | | T |
|---|---|---|---|---|---|---|---|---|
| Saint Mary's | | – | | 8 | – | 1 | – | 0 |
| Arizona | | – | | 6 | – | 1 | – | 1 |
| Santa Barbara State | | – | | 6 | – | 1 | – | 1 |
| Hawaii | | – | | 5 | – | 2 | – | 0 |
| Arizona State–Flagstaff | | – | | 4 | – | 2 | – | 1 |
| Columbia (OR) | | – | | 4 | – | 2 | – | 0 |
| Regis | | – | | 6 | – | 3 | – | 0 |
| San Francisco | | – | | 6 | – | 3 | – | 0 |
| New Mexico A&M | | – | | 5 | – | 3 | – | 0 |
| Santa Clara | | – | | 5 | – | 3 | – | 1 |
| New Mexico | | – | | 4 | – | 5 | – | 0 |
| Loyola (CA) | | – | | 2 | – | 3 | – | 1 |
| Arizona State | | – | | 3 | – | 5 | – | 1 |
| Gonzaga | | – | | 1 | – | 7 | – | 1 |
| Humboldt State | | – | | 0 | – | 6 | – | 0 |

The 1930 San Francisco Gray Fog football team was an American football team that represented the University of San Francisco as an independent during the 1930 college football season. In their seventh season under head coach Jimmy Needles, the Gray Fog compiled a 6–3 record and outscored opponents by a combined total of 114 to 86.

In June 1930, the school officially announced its intention to change its name from St. Ignatius College to the University of San Francisco. The football team played under its new name, the University of San Francisco, for the first time in an October 19 game against the West Coast Army.

== Schedule ==
| Date | Opponent | Site | Result | Attendance | Source |
|---|---|---|---|---|---|
| September 27 | San Diego Marines | Oakland, CA | W 26–0 | | |
| October 5 | Saint Mary's | Kezar Stadium; San Francisco | L 0–13 | 25,000 | |
| October 12 | Gonzaga | Kezar Stadium; San Francisco | W 13–12 | | |
| October 19 | West Coast Army | San Francisco | W 20–3 | | |
| October 25 | at Loyola (CA) | Wrigley Field; Los Angeles | W 14–0 | | |
| November 1 | at Nevada | Mackay Field; Reno, NV | W 20–13 | | |
| November 16 | Olympic Club | Kezar Stadium; San Francisco | L 7–32 | | |
| November 23 | at DePaul | Chicago | W 14–0 | | |
| November 30 | Santa Clara | Kezar Stadium; San Francisco | L 0–13 | 15,000 | |
