= Crimson Company =

Former show choir

- Years active: 1977–2000

The Crimson Company was a show choir associated with the Washington State University (WSU).

The WSU Alumni Association helped organize the student singing and dancing troupe in the late 1970s as a touring marketing vehicle for the university. It made its debut during the 1977 edition of the university's annual "Dad's Day" weekend and, over the years, grew from 16 singer-dancers supported by a three-piece instrumental combo to 18 singers-dancers backed by a nine-member instrumental combo. During its 23 years of activity it performed about 650 shows, according to the university.

In 2000, the Crimson Company was disbanded by the WSU Alumni Association due to what it said were the increasing costs associated with maintaining the group. According to the organization, spending on the Crimson Company was consuming 20-percent of its annual budget. Its final performances in Pullman, Washington were in spring of that year at the Gladish Community Center Auditorium.

== See also ==
- Washington State University Cougar Marching Band
