= 1930 Regis Rangers football team =

American college football season

1930 Regis Rangers football
- Conference: Independent
- Record: 6–3
- Head coach: Red Strader (3rd season)

1930 Western college football independents records
	Conf.			Overall
Team	W	L	T	W		L		T
Saint Mary's		–		8	–	1	–	0
Arizona		–		6	–	1	–	1
Santa Barbara State		–		6	–	1	–	1
Hawaii		–		5	–	2	–	0
Arizona State–Flagstaff		–		4	–	2	–	1
Columbia (OR)		–		4	–	2	–	0
Regis		–		6	–	3	–	0
San Francisco		–		6	–	3	–	0
New Mexico A&M		–		5	–	3	–	0
Santa Clara		–		5	–	3	–	1
New Mexico		–		4	–	5	–	0
Loyola (CA)		–		2	–	3	–	1
Arizona State		–		3	–	5	–	1
Gonzaga		–		1	–	7	–	1
Humboldt State		–		0	–	6	–	0

The 1930 Regis Rangers football team was an American football team that represented Regis College as an independent during the 1930 college football season. In their third season under head coach Red Strader, the Rangers compiled a 6–3 record and outscored opponents by a total of 159 to 121.

== Schedule ==
Date	Opponent	Site	Result	Attendance	Source
September 20	Denver	Denver University Stadium; Denver, CO	L 0–40	16,500	
September 27	Colorado Agricultural	Denver University Stadium; Denver, CO	W 14–7		
October 4	at Montana State	Gatton Field; Bozeman, MT	L 19–26		
October 11	Fort Russell	Denver, CO	W 34–0		
October 25	1st Infantry (WY)	Denver, CO	W 40–7		
October 25	Mount St. Charles	Denver, CO	W 19–6		
November 11	Colorado Mines	Denver, CO	W 13–9		
November 15	at Western State (CO)	Gunnison, CO	W 14–7		
November 22	BYU	Denver, CO	L 6–18	3,000	
