= 1930 Saint Mary's Gaels football team =

American college football season

1930 Saint Mary's Gaels football
- Conference: Independent
- Record: 8–1
- Head coach: Slip Madigan (10th season)
- Home stadium: Kezar Stadium

1930 Western college football independents records
	Conf.			Overall
Team	W	L	T	W		L		T
Saint Mary's		–		8	–	1	–	0
Arizona		–		6	–	1	–	1
Santa Barbara State		–		6	–	1	–	1
Hawaii		–		5	–	2	–	0
Arizona State–Flagstaff		–		4	–	2	–	1
Columbia (OR)		–		4	–	2	–	0
Regis		–		6	–	3	–	0
San Francisco		–		6	–	3	–	0
New Mexico A&M		–		5	–	3	–	0
Santa Clara		–		5	–	3	–	1
New Mexico		–		4	–	5	–	0
Loyola (CA)		–		2	–	3	–	1
Arizona State		–		3	–	5	–	1
Gonzaga		–		1	–	7	–	1
Humboldt State		–		0	–	6	–	0

The 1930 Saint Mary's Gaels football team was an American football team that represented Saint Mary's College of California during the 1930 college football season. In their tenth season under head coach Slip Madigan, the Gaels compiled an 8–1 record, shut out five of nine opponents, and outscored all opponents by a combined total of 168 to 31. The Gaels' victories included a 21–6 besting of UCLA, a 20–12 besting of Fordham, and a 7–6 victory over Oregon. The lone setback was a 7–6 loss to California.

End Harry Ebding was selected by both the Associated Press and the United Press as first-team player on the 1930 All-Pacific Coast football team.

== Schedule ==
Date	Opponent	Site	Result	Attendance	Source
September 28	West Coast Army	Kezar Stadium; San Francisco, CA	W 32–0	11,000	
October 4	San Francisco	Kezar Stadium; San Francisco, CA	W 13–0	25,000	
October 11	at California	California Memorial Stadium; Berkeley, CA	L 6–7	80,000	
October 17	at UCLA	L.A. Memorial Coliseum; Los Angeles, CA	W 21–6	15,000	
October 26	at Gonzaga	Gonzaga Stadium; Spokane, WA	W 41–0	20,000	
November 2	vs. Santa Clara	Kezar Stadium; San Francisco, CA	W 13–0	45,000	
November 9	Olympic Club	Kezar Stadium; San Francisco, CA	W 15–0	10,000	
November 15	at Fordham	Polo Grounds; New York, NY	W 20–12	35,000	
November 27	Oregon	Kezar Stadium; San Francisco, CA (rivalry)	W 7–6	27,000	
