= 1930 Columbia Irish football team =

American college football season

1930 Columbia Irish football
- Conference: Independent
- Record: 4–2
- Head coach: Gene Murphy (4th season)
- Home stadium: Multnomah Stadium

1930 Western college football independents records
	Conf.			Overall
Team	W	L	T	W		L		T
Saint Mary's		–		8	–	1	–	0
Arizona		–		6	–	1	–	1
Santa Barbara State		–		6	–	1	–	1
Hawaii		–		5	–	2	–	0
Arizona State–Flagstaff		–		4	–	2	–	1
Columbia (OR)		–		4	–	2	–	0
Regis		–		6	–	3	–	0
San Francisco		–		6	–	3	–	0
New Mexico A&M		–		5	–	3	–	0
Santa Clara		–		5	–	3	–	1
New Mexico		–		4	–	5	–	0
Loyola (CA)		–		2	–	3	–	1
Arizona State		–		3	–	5	–	1
Gonzaga		–		1	–	7	–	1
Humboldt State		–		0	–	6	–	0

The 1930 Columbia Irish football team was an American football team that represented Columbia University (later renamed the University of Portland) as an independent during the 1930 college football season. In its fourth year under head coach Gene Murphy, the team compiled a 4–2 record. The team played its home games at Multnomah Stadium in Portland, Oregon.

== Schedule ==
Date	Opponent	Site	Result	Attendance	Source
October 3	Pacific (OR)	Multnomah Stadium; Portland, OR	W 13–6		
October 31	at Albany (OR)	Albany, OR	W 13–0		
November 7	at Oregon Normal	Butler Field; Monmouth, OR	L 0–9		
November 14	Puget Sound	Portland, OR	W 7–0		
November 21	Linfield	Portland, OR	W 8–0		
November 30	Saint Martin's	Multnomah Stadium; Portland, OR	L 0–27		
