= 1930 UCLA Bruins football team =

American college football season

1930 UCLA Bruins football
- Conference: Pacific Coast Conference
- Record: 3–5 (1–4 PCC)
- Head coach: William H. Spaulding (6th season)
- Home stadium: Los Angeles Memorial Coliseum

1930 Pacific Coast Conference football standings
	Conf.					Overall
Team	W		L		T	W		L		T
No. 2 Washington State $	6	–	0	–	0	9	–	1	–	0
No. 6 USC	5	–	1	–	0	8	–	2	–	0
No. 7 Stanford	4	–	1	–	0	9	–	1	–	1
Oregon	3	–	1	–	0	7	–	2	–	0
Washington	3	–	4	–	0	5	–	4	–	0
Oregon State	2	–	3	–	0	7	–	3	–	0
Montana	1	–	3	–	0	5	–	3	–	0
California	1	–	4	–	0	4	–	5	–	0
UCLA	1	–	4	–	0	3	–	5	–	0
Idaho	0	–	5	–	0	4	–	7	–	0
$ – Conference champion; Rankings from Dickinson System

The 1930 UCLA Bruins football team was an American football team that represented the University of California, Los Angeles (UCLA) during the 1930 college football season. In their sixth year under head coach William H. Spaulding, the Bruins compiled a 3–5 record (1–4 conference) and finished in a tie for eighth place in the Pacific Coast Conference.

== Schedule ==
Date	Opponent	Site	Result	Attendance	Source
September 27	USC	Los Angeles Memorial Coliseum; Los Angeles, CA (Victory Bell)	L 0–52	40,000	
October 11	Pomona*	Los Angeles Memorial Coliseum; Los Angeles, CA	W 21–0	7,000	
October 17	Saint Mary's*	Los Angeles Memorial Coliseum; Los Angeles, CA	L 6–21	15,000	
October 24	Caltech*	Los Angeles Memorial Coliseum; Los Angeles, CA	W 30–0	3,000	
October 31	Stanford	Los Angeles Memorial Coliseum; Los Angeles, CA	L 0–20	30,000	
November 8	at Oregon	Hayward Field; Eugene, OR	L 0–7	6,500	
November 21	Oregon State	Los Angeles Memorial Coliseum; Los Angeles, CA	L 0–19	10,000	
November 29	Idaho	Los Angeles Memorial Coliseum; Los Angeles, CA	W 20–6	4,000	
*Non-conference game
