= 1930 Washington Huskies football team =

American college football season

1930 Washington Huskies football
- Conference: Pacific Coast Conference
- Record: 5–4 (3–4 PCC)
- Head coach: James Phelan (1st season)
- Captain: Al Holmes
- Home stadium: University of Washington Stadium

1930 Pacific Coast Conference football standings
	Conf.					Overall
Team	W		L		T	W		L		T
No. 2 Washington State $	6	–	0	–	0	9	–	1	–	0
No. 6 USC	5	–	1	–	0	8	–	2	–	0
No. 7 Stanford	4	–	1	–	0	9	–	1	–	1
Oregon	3	–	1	–	0	7	–	2	–	0
Washington	3	–	4	–	0	5	–	4	–	0
Oregon State	2	–	3	–	0	7	–	3	–	0
Montana	1	–	3	–	0	5	–	3	–	0
California	1	–	4	–	0	4	–	5	–	0
UCLA	1	–	4	–	0	3	–	5	–	0
Idaho	0	–	5	–	0	4	–	7	–	0
$ – Conference champion; Rankings from Dickinson System

The 1930 Washington Huskies football team was an American football team that represented the University of Washington during the 1930 college football season. In its first season under head coach James Phelan, the team compiled a 5–4 record, finished in fifth place in the Pacific Coast Conference, and outscored all opponents by a combined total of 182 to 67.

== Schedule ==
Date	Opponent	Site	Result	Attendance	Source
September 27	Whitman*	University of Washington Stadium; Seattle, WA	W 48–0	10,979	
October 4	Montana	University of Washington Stadium; Seattle, WA	W 27–0	20,000	
October 11	Idaho	University of Washington Stadium; Seattle, WA	W 27–0	12,332	
October 18	at Oregon	Multnomah Stadium; Portland, OR (rivalry)	L 0–7	35,266	
October 25	California	University of Washington Stadium; Seattle, WA	W 13–0	25,284	
November 1	Puget Sound*	University of Washington Stadium; Seattle, WA	W 60–0	5,108	
November 8	at Stanford	Stanford Stadium; Stanford, CA	L 7–25	15,187	
November 15	Washington State	University of Washington Stadium; Seattle, WA (rivalry)	L 0–3	42,000	
November 27	at USC	Los Angeles Memorial Coliseum; Los Angeles, CA	L 0–32	35,000	
*Non-conference game
