= 1930 New Mexico A&M Aggies football team =

American college football season

1930 New Mexico A&M Aggies football
- Conference: Independent
- Record: 5–3
- Head coach: Jerry Hines (2nd season)
- Home stadium: Miller Field

1930 Western college football independents records
	Conf.			Overall
Team	W	L	T	W		L		T
Saint Mary's		–		8	–	1	–	0
Arizona		–		6	–	1	–	1
Santa Barbara State		–		6	–	1	–	1
Hawaii		–		5	–	2	–	0
Arizona State–Flagstaff		–		4	–	2	–	1
Columbia (OR)		–		4	–	2	–	0
Regis		–		6	–	3	–	0
San Francisco		–		6	–	3	–	0
New Mexico A&M		–		5	–	3	–	0
Santa Clara		–		5	–	3	–	1
New Mexico		–		4	–	5	–	0
Loyola (CA)		–		2	–	3	–	1
Arizona State		–		3	–	5	–	1
Gonzaga		–		1	–	7	–	1
Humboldt State		–		0	–	6	–	0

The 1930 New Mexico A&M Aggies football team was an American football team that represented New Mexico College of Agriculture and Mechanical Arts (now known as New Mexico State University) during the 1929 college football season. In their second year under head coach Jerry Hines, the Aggies compiled a 5–3 record and shut out three opponents. The team played home games on Miller Field, sometimes also referred to as College Field.

== Schedule ==
Date	Opponent	Site	Result	Source
September 28	New Mexico Normal	Miller Field; Las Cruces, NM	W 25–0	
October 3	at Texas Tech	Tech Field; Lubbock, TX	L 0–14	
October 18	Arizona State–Flagstaff	Miller Field; Las Cruces, NM	L 6–9	
October 25	Arizona State	Miller Field; Las Cruces, NM	W 7–0	
November 1	Gila Junior College	Miller Field; Las Cruces, NM	W 38–0	
November 8	at New Mexico	University Field; Albuquerque, NM (rivalry)	W 14–6	
November 15	Texas Mines	Miller Field; Las Cruces, NM (rivalry)	L 0–25	
November 27	at New Mexico Military	Roswell, NM	W 25–19	
