= Washington State University Cougar Marching Band =

College marching band in Pullman, Washington

- The CMB performing at "Cougville" in September 2026
- School: Washington State University
- Location: Pullman, Washington, U.S.
- Conference: Pac-12 Conference
- Founded: 1923; 103 years ago
- Director: Jon Sweet
- Associate Director: Sarah Miller
- Assistant Directors: A.J. Miller; Christopher Wilson
- Members: 260
- Fight song: "Win the Day" and "All Hail"
- Motto: "Best in the West!"

Uniform
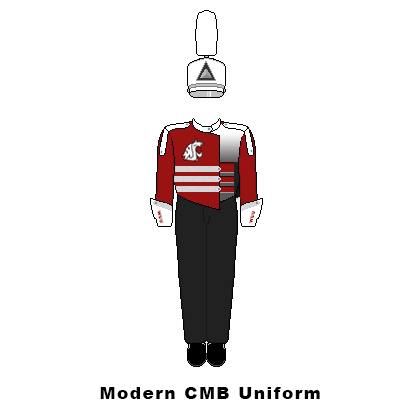
- Website: marchingband.wsu.edu

The Washington State University Cougar Marching Band (or CMB) is the marching band of Washington State University. With over 250 members, the Cougar Marching Band performs at every home football game and select away games.

The CMB hosts a Band Day and a Marching Band Competition. The latter was started in 2015 to give high school bands in the region a premiere competitive event.

== Directors ==
Directors of the Cougar Marching Band
Director	Years	Length of Direction
Karel Havlicek	1923-1927	5 years
Harold Wheeler	1928-1950	23 years
Howard Deming	1951-1964	14 years
Max McKee	1965-1966	2 years
John Knoll	1967-1968	2 years
Judd Aetzel	1969	1 year
Richard Uthmann	1970	1 year
John Newman	1971-1972	2 years
Larry Hudson	1973	1 year
Jack Prindle	1974	1 year
Scott Randolph	1975-1976	2 years
Howard Meeker	1977-1981	5 years
Patricia Root	1982-1988	7 years
Timothy Hoey	1989-1990	2 years
Donald Hower	1991-2013	23 years
Troy Bennefield	2014-2022	9 years
Jonathan Sweet	2023-	-

== Band Composition ==
=== Instrumentation ===
- Piccolos
- Clarinets
- Alto Saxophones
- Tenor Saxophones
- Trumpets
- Mellophones
- Trombones
- Baritones
- Sousaphones
- Snares
- Tenors
- Basses
- Cymbals

=== Color Guard ===
- Flags
- Rifles

=== Twirling Team ===
- Feature Twirler
- Twirlers

The feature twirler and twirling team are auditioned roles. They perform alongside the band during all events on game day.

== Repertoire ==
The CMB performing pregame in Martin Stadium

=== "The Fight Song" ===
"The Fight Song" is the fight song of the university. The song was composed in 1919 by WSU student Phyllis Sayles with fellow student Zella Melcher penning the lyrics. In 2019, the CMB celebrated the 100th anniversary of the fight song by premiering a new version titled "Win the Day". It retains the same structure as the original with modernized composition. It is now the standard version of the fight song used by the band.

=== The Alma Mater ===
"Washington, My Washington" is the alma mater of the university. It was composed by James DeForest Cline in 1914 for a pep contest, and was adopted by the university in 1919 to be the alma mater. The version in use currently is an arrangement by past CMB director, Troy Bennefield.

=== Other common tunes ===
The CMB plays many songs and "shorts" to get the crowd excited. The most common are:

- "Jaws" (Third Down Tradition)
- "Goons"
- "Fire"
- "The Ecstasy of Gold"
- “Go Cougs Go” (Parody of “Go Cubs Go”)
- "Seven Nation Army"
- "Louie Louie"
- "Right Above It"
- "Light 'Em Up"
- "Word Up"
- "2 Points"
- "Avengers" (Avengers Theme)
- "Narco"
- "Starships"
- "Visionary"

== Travel ==
The CMB travels to the annual Apple Cup football game, a rivalry game against the Washington Huskies, when held in Seattle. In addition, the entire band travels to post-season bowl games.

=== Bowl Game Appearances since 1998 ===
- 1998 Rose Bowl
- 2001 Sun Bowl
- 2003 Rose Bowl
- 2003 Holiday Bowl
- 2013 New Mexico Bowl
- 2015 Sun Bowl
- 2016 Holiday Bowl
- 2017 Holiday Bowl
- 2018 Alamo Bowl
- 2019 Cheez-it Bowl
- 2022 LA Bowl
- 2024 Holiday Bowl
- 2025 Famous Idaho Potato Bowl

In 1987, the CMB traveled to Tokyo, Japan to participate in the Coca-Cola Classic, a regular season college football game against Cal. The game ended in a tie.

In 2017, the CMB combined with members of the University of Washington Husky Marching Band and University of Oregon Marching Band to march in the St. Patrick's Day Parade in Dublin, Ireland.

The WSU Pep Bands travel with the Men’s and Women’s Basketball teams to conference and postseason tournaments. Recently, the Women’s Pep Band has performed at the NCAA Women’s Basketball Tournaments in 2021, 2022, and 2023, while the Men’s Pep Band appeared at the 2024 NCAA Men’s Basketball Tournament and the 2025 College Basketball Crown Tournament.

== Halftime Shows ==
The CMB performs a new halftime show for every home football game. This results in approximately six different shows for the CMB every year. The band also performs a halftime show at select away games and bowl games. The following list consists of some of the shows the CMB has performed for halftime.

=== 2022 ===
- "Tribute to Taylor Hawkins" - Both the WSU and Idaho Vandal marching bands performed music by Foo Fighters.
- "Band Day" - The CMB welcomed high school students to play "It's About Damn Time" and "As It Was".
- "A Celebration of Queer Artists" - A show highlighting music's most influential LGBTQ artists.
- "Foo Fighters" - A continuation of the CMB's first show of the year, featuring more music by Foo Fighters.
- "Santana" - The CMB performs Santana's most famous repertoire, featuring WSU's professor of guitar, Dr. Cesar Haas.
- "Bill Chase" - A show consisting of music by the jazz-rock band Chase.
- "Senior Show: Queen" - A show from a prior year that graduating CMB seniors vote on to perform again.

=== 2023 ===
- "Hard Rock Pullman" - A show with music by Led Zeppelin, Metallica, Nirvana, and Lynyrd Skynyrd.
- "100 Years of WSU Bands" - The CMB and over 100 CMB alumni band members celebrate the 100th anniversary of the establishment of pep and concert bands at WSU.
- "New Orleans" - The CMB is joined by local high schoolers to perform a show honoring New Orleans.
- "Shrek" - A show featuring music and characters from the Shrek movies.
- "Cougs in Space!" - A show featuring Richard Strauss' "Also sprach Zarathustra", music from Star Trek composed by Michael Giacchino, and "Rocket Man" by Elton John.
- "Home" - A show celebrating the state of Washington and the city of Pullman. The show was done in recognition of Native American Heritage Month, featuring the songs "Come and Get Your Love" by Redbone and "Take Me Home, Country Roads" by John Denver.

=== 2024 ===
- "Cougs in Flight" - A show featuring the songs "Jet" by Paul McCartney and Wings, "Danger Zone" by Kenny Loggins, "Fly Like an Eagle" by the Steve Miller Band, "Learn to Fly" by Foo Fighters, "Fly Away" by Lenny Kravitz, and "Defying Gravity" from the musical, Wicked.
- "Hall of Fame Inductees" - A show featuring artists inducted into the 2024 Rock and Roll Hall of Fame. Songs include “Juke Box Hero” by Foreigner, “Family Affair” by Mary J. Blige, and a medley of songs by Cher.
- “Country Divas” - A show featuring the songs “Jolene” by Dolly Parton, “Fancy” by Reba McEntire, “Before He Cheats” by Carrie Underwood, and “Texas Hold ‘Em” by Beyoncé.
- "Cartoons" - A show featuring music from The Simpsons, Futurama, King of the Hill, Family Guy, South Park, and Avatar: The Last Airbender.
- "Thank You" - A show thanking fans and donors for their support in raising $250,000 for new uniforms, featuring "Home Team" by Lakeview, "Larger Than Life" by Backstreet Boys, and "Thank You for Being a Friend" by Andrew Gold.
- "The Music of Bon Jovi" - A show theme voted on by the band's seniors featuring the Bon Jovi songs "You Give Love a Bad Name", "It's My Life", and "Livin' on a Prayer".

=== 2025 ===
- "Lady Gaga" - A show featuring the University of Idaho's Vandal Marching Band, celebrating the music of Lady Gaga. The Vandal Marching Band performed "Bad Romance", the Cougar Marching Band performed "Abracadabra", and the bands came together to perform "Hold My Hand".
- "Heart" - A show featuring the songs "Barracuda" and "Alone", both by the band Heart.
- "The '80s Show" - A show highlighting the movies Back to The Future and Dirty Dancing. The Dirty Dancing segment featured a complex drill sequence of two figures dancing, ending with the iconic lift dance move from the movie.
- "Video Games" - A celebration of video games, featuring the music of Halo, Super Mario, The Legend of Zelda, Pokémon, Minecraft, Skyrim, and Undertale.
- "The Dragon Show" - A show about dragons featuring music from Game of Thrones, Homestar Runner, and How to Train Your Dragon.
- "The Music of Danny Elfman" - A show theme voted on by the band's seniors featuring music from The Nightmare Before Christmas and Beetlejuice.

=== 2026 ===
- "The Breakup Show" - A show featuring the songs "I'll Be There For You" by The Rembrandts, "Since U Been Gone" by Kelly Clarkson, "Bad Blood" by Taylor Swift, "Everybody Hurts" by R.E.M., "Someone Like You" by Adele, "Go Your Own Way" by Fleetwood Mac, and "Hard to Say I'm Sorry/Get Away" by Chicago.
- "The U.S.A. Show" - A show done with the accompaniment of local high schools for "High School Honor Band Day". The show featured the songs "R.O.C.K. in the U.S.A." by John Cougar Mellencamp, "Born in the U.S.A." by Bruce Springsteen, and "Party in the U.S.A." by Miley Cyrus.
- "Alumni Day + The Music of Dolly Parton" - A show done with CMB alumni performing on the field, including a run of WSU pregame and a medley of "9 to 5", "Islands in the Stream", and "Jolene".
- "James Bond" - A show featuring theme songs from the James Bond franchise. The setlist included the James Bond Theme, Live and Let Die by Paul McCartney and Wings, You Know My Name from Casino Royale, and Skyfall by Adele.
- "Shark Show" - A shark-themed show. The setlist included the Jaws theme, "Fins" by Jimmy Buffett, "Mack the Knife", "Teenage Dream" by Katy Perry, and "Baby Shark". The show also marked the first instance of the CMB performing with the stadium lights dimmed and the members utilizing multi-color LED lights to enhance their drill formations.

== WSU Marching Band Championships ==
The WSU Marching Band Championships is an independent, annual high school marching band competition hosted by the CMB. Bands from primarily eastern Washington and northern Idaho compete in a modern two-round competition format, consisting of prelims and finals. The festival is coordinated by the CMB, and was started in 2015 to serve high school marching bands in the region. The CMB performs as an exhibition group at this event.

== Service ==
The marching band is supported by the Iota Gamma chapter of Kappa Kappa Psi, and the Theta Delta chapter of Tau Beta Sigma. They were both chartered on April 1, 1989 and are a part of the Western District.

== Former Members ==
- Dolph Lundgren
- Mahlon Merrick (composer and film actor)

== See also ==
- Crimson Company
