= 1930 Arizona State Bulldogs football team =

American college football season

1930 Arizona State Bulldogs football
- Conference: Independent
- Record: 3–5–1
- Head coach: Ted Shipkey (1st season)
- Captain: Norris Stevenson
- Home stadium: Irish Field

1930 Western college football independents records
	Conf.			Overall
Team	W	L	T	W		L		T
Saint Mary's		–		8	–	1	–	0
Arizona		–		6	–	1	–	1
Santa Barbara State		–		6	–	1	–	1
Hawaii		–		5	–	2	–	0
Arizona State–Flagstaff		–		4	–	2	–	1
Columbia (OR)		–		4	–	2	–	0
Regis		–		6	–	3	–	0
San Francisco		–		6	–	3	–	0
New Mexico A&M		–		5	–	3	–	0
Santa Clara		–		5	–	3	–	1
New Mexico		–		4	–	5	–	0
Loyola (CA)		–		2	–	3	–	1
Arizona State		–		3	–	5	–	1
Gonzaga		–		1	–	7	–	1
Humboldt State		–		0	–	6	–	0

The 1930 Arizona State Bulldogs football team was an American football team that represented Arizona State Teachers College (later renamed Arizona State University) as an independent during the 1930 college football season. In their first season under head coach Ted Shipkey, the Bulldogs compiled a 3–5–1 record and outscored their opponents by a combined total of 111 to 94. Arizona State's team captain was HB Norris Stevenson. The Bulldogs finished 3–0 at home and 0–5–1 on the road. Home games were played at Irish Field in Tempe, Arizona.

== Schedule ==
Date	Opponent	Site	Result
September 27	Gila JC	Irish Field; Tempe, AZ	W 39–0
October 4	at Texas Mines	El Paso HS Stadium; El Paso, TX	L 6–19
October 18	at Arizona	Arizona Stadium; Tucson, AZ (rivalry)	L 0–6
October 25	at New Mexico A&M	Miller Field; Las Cruces, NM	L 0–7
November 1	at Sacramento Junior College	Sacramento, CA	L 0–49
November 8	at Arizona State–Flagstaff	Skidmore Field; Flagstaff, AZ	T 0–0
November 15	Arizona freshmen	Irish Field; Tempe, AZ	W 39–6
November 22	Fullerton JC	Irish Field; Tempe, AZ	W 21–0
November 29	at Arizona State–Flagstaff	Skidmore Field; Flagstaff, AZ	L 6–7

== Game summaries ==
On September 27, in its season opener, Arizona State defeated Gila College (later renamed Eastern Arizona College), 39–0, before 4,000 spectators at Irish Field. It was the first night football game played in Arizona.

On October 4, the Bulldogs suffered a 19–6 road loss at College of Mines and Metallurgy of the University of Texas (later renamed University of Texas at El Paso).

On October 18, Arizona State lost to Arizona, 6–0, on the road in their annual football rivalry game.

On October 25, the Bulldogs fell to New Mexico A&M, 7–0, on the road in Las Cruces, New Mexico. It was the first meeting between the two football programs.

On November 1, Arizona State lost to Sacramento Junior College, 49–0, in Sacramento. It marked the first and only meeting between the two football programs.

On November 8, the Bulldogs were shut out for the fourth straight game, as they finished in a 0–0 tie against Arizona State Teachers College at Flagstaff (ASTCF, later renamed Northern Arizona University) on the road.

On November 15, Arizona State recorded a 39–6 home win over the Arizona freshman in the annual homecoming at Irish Field.

On November 22, in their home finale, the Bulldogs shut out Fullerton Junior College, 21–0, in Tempe. Fullback Horace Smitheran scored all three touchdowns and kicked all three extra points, and halfback Norris Steverson had a 75-yard punt. The game was the first and only meeting between the two football programs.

On November 29, Arizona State ended its season with a 7–6 road loss against ASTCF.

== Roster ==
The usual Arizona State lineup included left end Bob Smith, left tackle Cleo Caywood, Guideo Cislaghi, left guard Paul Griffin, center Mercier Willard, right guard Bob Hezmalbalch, right tackle Norman Clements, quarterback Anson Cooper, halfbacks Norris Steverson and Tom McCarty, and fullback Horace Smitheran.

Oliver Anderson and Lowell Callahan were also on the roster.
