= 1930 Santa Barbara State Roadrunners football team =

American college football season

1930 Santa Barbara State Roadrunners football
- Conference: Independent
- Record: 6–1–1
- Head coach: Harold Davis (3rd season)
- Home stadium: Peabody Stadium

1930 Western college football independents records
	Conf.			Overall
Team	W	L	T	W		L		T
Saint Mary's		–		8	–	1	–	0
Arizona		–		6	–	1	–	1
Santa Barbara State		–		6	–	1	–	1
Hawaii		–		5	–	2	–	0
Arizona State–Flagstaff		–		4	–	2	–	1
Columbia (OR)		–		4	–	2	–	0
Regis		–		6	–	3	–	0
San Francisco		–		6	–	3	–	0
New Mexico A&M		–		5	–	3	–	0
Santa Clara		–		5	–	3	–	1
New Mexico		–		4	–	5	–	0
Loyola (CA)		–		2	–	3	–	1
Arizona State		–		3	–	5	–	1
Gonzaga		–		1	–	7	–	1
Humboldt State		–		0	–	6	–	0

The 1930 Santa Barbara State Roadrunners football team represented Santa Barbara State (Note: University of California, Santa Barbara was known as Santa Barbara State College from 1921 to 1943.) during the 1930 college football season.

Santa Barbara State competed as an Independent in 1929 and 1930. They joined the Southern California Intercollegiate Athletic Conference (SCIAC) in 1931. The Roadrunners were led by third-year head coach Harold Davis and played home games at Peabody Stadium in Santa Barbara, California. They finished the season with a record of six wins, one loss and one tie (6–1–1). Overall, the team outscored its opponents 97–51 for the season.

== Schedule ==
Date	Opponent	Site	Result
September 27	Caltech	Peabody Stadium; Santa Barbara, CA	T 6–6
October 4	California Christian	Peabody Stadium; Santa Barbara, CA	W 7–0
October 11	Redlands	Peabody Stadium; Santa Barbara, CA	W 7–6
October 18	La Verne	Peabody Stadium; Santa Barbara, CA	W 25–6
October 24	at Whittier	Memorial Stadium; Whittier, CA	W 13–6
October 31	at Santa Maria	Santa Maria, CA	W 33–6
November 7	at Ventura	Ventura, CA	W 6–0
November 14	Occidental	Peabody Stadium; Santa Barbara, CA	L 0–21
