= 1930 Hawaii Rainbows football team =

American college football season

1930 Hawaii Rainbows football
- Conference: Independent
- Record: 5–2
- Head coach: Otto Klum (10th season)
- Home stadium: Honolulu Stadium

1930 Western college football independents records
	Conf.			Overall
Team	W	L	T	W		L		T
Saint Mary's		–		8	–	1	–	0
Arizona		–		6	–	1	–	1
Santa Barbara State		–		6	–	1	–	1
Hawaii		–		5	–	2	–	0
Arizona State–Flagstaff		–		4	–	2	–	1
Columbia (OR)		–		4	–	2	–	0
Regis		–		6	–	3	–	0
San Francisco		–		6	–	3	–	0
New Mexico A&M		–		5	–	3	–	0
Santa Clara		–		5	–	3	–	1
New Mexico		–		4	–	5	–	0
Loyola (CA)		–		2	–	3	–	1
Arizona State		–		3	–	5	–	1
Gonzaga		–		1	–	7	–	1
Humboldt State		–		0	–	6	–	0

The 1930 Hawaii Rainbows football team represented the University of Hawaiʻi (now known as the University of Hawaiʻi at Mānoa) as an independent during the 1930 college football season. Led by 10th-year head coach Otto Klum, the Rainbows compiled an overall record of 5–2.

== Schedule ==
Date	Opponent	Site	Result	Attendance	Source
September 27	Hawaii alumni	Honolulu Stadium; Honolulu, Territory of Hawaii	W 12–6	4,000	
October 8	Honolulu Athletic Club	Honolulu Stadium; Honolulu, Territory of Hawaii	W 28–0	9,000	
October 22	Saint Louis School alumni	Honolulu Stadium; Honolulu, Territory of Hawaii	W 19–7	8,000	
October 29	Honolulu Town Team	Honolulu Stadium; Honolulu, Territory of Hawaii	L 0–7	10,000	
November 15	at USC	Los Angeles Memorial Coliseum; Los Angeles, CA	L 0–52	30,000	
December 10	BYU	Honolulu Stadium; Honolulu, Territory of Hawaii	W 49–13	10,000	
January 1, 1931	Idaho	Honolulu Stadium; Honolulu, Territory of Hawaii	W 37–0	12,000	
