= 1930 Arizona State–Flagstaff Lumberjacks football team =

American college football season

1930 Arizona State–Flagstaff Lumberjacks football
- Conference: Independent
- Record: 4–2–1
- Head coach: Rudy Lavik (4th season)
- Home stadium: Skidmore Field

1930 Western college football independents records
	Conf.			Overall
Team	W	L	T	W		L		T
Saint Mary's		–		8	–	1	–	0
Arizona		–		6	–	1	–	1
Santa Barbara State		–		6	–	1	–	1
Hawaii		–		5	–	2	–	0
Arizona State–Flagstaff		–		4	–	2	–	1
Columbia (OR)		–		4	–	2	–	0
Regis		–		6	–	3	–	0
San Francisco		–		6	–	3	–	0
New Mexico A&M		–		5	–	3	–	0
Santa Clara		–		5	–	3	–	1
New Mexico		–		4	–	5	–	0
Loyola (CA)		–		2	–	3	–	1
Arizona State		–		3	–	5	–	1
Gonzaga		–		1	–	7	–	1
Humboldt State		–		0	–	6	–	0

The 1930 Arizona State–Flagstaff Lumberjacks football team was an American football team that represented Arizona State Teachers College at Flagstaff (now known as Northern Arizona University) as an independent during the 1930 college football season. In their fourth year under head coach Rudy Lavik, the Lumberjacks compiled a 4–2–1 record.

== Schedule ==
Date	Opponent	Site	Result	Attendance	Source
September 27	New Mexico Mines	Skidmore Field; Flagstaff, AZ	W 71–0		
October 4	at Whittier	Hadley Field; Whittier, CA	W 20–0	3,000	
October 18	at New Mexico A&M	Miller Field; Las Cruces, NM	W 9–6		
October 25	New Mexico^{†}	Skidmore Field; Flagstaff, AZ	L 0–25		
November 8	Arizona State	Skidmore Field; Flagstaff, AZ	T 0–0		
November 11	at Los Angeles City Firemen	Wrigley Field; Los Angeles, CA	L 6–31		
November 29	at Arizona State	Irish Field; Tempe, AZ	W 7–6		
^{†}Homecoming
