= 1930 Idaho Vandals football team =

American college football season

1930 Idaho Vandals football
- Conference: Pacific Coast Conference
- Record: 4–7 (0–5 PCC)
- Head coach: Leo Calland (2nd season)
- Home stadium: MacLean Field

1930 Pacific Coast Conference football standings
	Conf.					Overall
Team	W		L		T	W		L		T
No. 2 Washington State $	6	–	0	–	0	9	–	1	–	0
No. 6 USC	5	–	1	–	0	8	–	2	–	0
No. 7 Stanford	4	–	1	–	0	9	–	1	–	1
Oregon	3	–	1	–	0	7	–	2	–	0
Washington	3	–	4	–	0	5	–	4	–	0
Oregon State	2	–	3	–	0	7	–	3	–	0
Montana	1	–	3	–	0	5	–	3	–	0
California	1	–	4	–	0	4	–	5	–	0
UCLA	1	–	4	–	0	3	–	5	–	0
Idaho	0	–	5	–	0	4	–	7	–	0
$ – Conference champion; Rankings from Dickinson System

The 1930 Idaho Vandals football team represented the University of Idaho in the 1930 college football season. The Vandals were led by second-year head coach Leo Calland, and were members of the Pacific Coast Conference. Home games were played on campus in Moscow at MacLean Field, with one in Boise at Public School Field.

Idaho compiled a 4–7 overall record but lost all five games in the PCC. For the only time in Calland's six seasons as head coach, the Vandals lost to rival Montana.

In the Battle of the Palouse with neighbor Washington State, the Vandals suffered a fourth straight loss, falling 7–33 at homecoming in Moscow on November 8. Idaho's most recent win in the series was five years earlier in 1925 and the next was 24 years away in 1954.

== Schedule ==
Date	Opponent	Site	Result	Attendance	Source
September 27	Montana State*	MacLean Field; Moscow, ID	L 6–7		
October 4	vs. College of Idaho*	Public School Field; Boise, ID	W 30–6		
October 11	at Washington	Husky Stadium; Seattle, WA	L 0–27	12,332	
October 18	Whitman*	MacLean Field; Moscow, ID	W 47–0		
October 25	at Oregon	Hayward Field; Eugene, OR	L 6–20		
November 1	at Gonzaga*	Gonzaga Stadium; Spokane, WA (rivalry)	W 26–0	6,000	
November 8	Washington State^{†}	MacLean Field; Moscow, ID (Battle of the Palouse)	L 7–33	7,000	
November 22	at Montana	Dornblaser Field; Missoula, MT (rivlary)	L 6–12		
November 29	at UCLA	Los Angeles Memorial Coliseum; Los Angeles, CA	L 6–20	4,000	
December 25	vs. Saint Louis College alumni*	Honolulu, Territory of Hawaii	W 20–14	3,000	
January 1, 1931	at Hawaii*	Honolulu Stadium; Honolulu, Territory of Hawaii	L 0–37	12,000	
*Non-conference game; ^{†}Homecoming

== All-conference ==
No Vandals were named to the All-Coast team; on the All-Northwest team, fullback Fred Wilkie was a second team selection.
