= 1930 Humboldt State Lumberjacks football team =

American college football season

1930 Humboldt State Lumberjacks football
- Conference: Independent
- Record: 0–6
- Head coach: Fred Telonicher (4th season)
- Home stadium: Albee Stadium

1930 Western college football independents records
	Conf.			Overall
Team	W	L	T	W		L		T
Saint Mary's		–		8	–	1	–	0
Arizona		–		6	–	1	–	1
Santa Barbara State		–		6	–	1	–	1
Hawaii		–		5	–	2	–	0
Arizona State–Flagstaff		–		4	–	2	–	1
Columbia (OR)		–		4	–	2	–	0
Regis		–		6	–	3	–	0
San Francisco		–		6	–	3	–	0
New Mexico A&M		–		5	–	3	–	0
Santa Clara		–		5	–	3	–	1
New Mexico		–		4	–	5	–	0
Loyola (CA)		–		2	–	3	–	1
Arizona State		–		3	–	5	–	1
Gonzaga		–		1	–	7	–	1
Humboldt State		–		0	–	6	–	0

The 1930 Humboldt State Lumberjacks football team represented Humboldt State Normal College—now known as California State Polytechnic University, Humboldt—as an independent during the 1930 college football season. Led by fourth-year head coach Fred Telonicher, the Lumberjacks compiled a record of 0–6. Humboldt State was shut out in five of their six games and gave up an average of 45 points per game, being outscored 268 to 7 for the season. The team played home games at Albee Stadium in Eureka, California.

== Schedule ==
Date	Opponent	Site	Result	Source
October 4	at Chico State	College Field; Chico, CA	L 0–58	
October 10	Southern Oregon Normal	Albee Stadium; Eureka, CA	L 7–19	
October 18	at Oregon Normal	Monmouth, OR	L 0–33	
November 1	Saint Mary's freshmen	Albee Stadium; Eureka, CA	L 0–53	
November 8	at Menlo	Atherton, CA	L 0–92	
November 15	at Santa Rosa	Nevers Field; Santa Rosa, CA	L 0–13	
