= 1930 Oregon State Beavers football team =

American college football season

1930 Oregon State Beavers football
- Conference: Pacific Coast Conference
- Record: 7–3 (2–3 PCC)
- Head coach: Paul J. Schissler (7th season)
- Captain: None
- Home stadium: Bell Field

1930 Pacific Coast Conference football standings
	Conf.					Overall
Team	W		L		T	W		L		T
No. 2 Washington State $	6	–	0	–	0	9	–	1	–	0
No. 6 USC	5	–	1	–	0	8	–	2	–	0
No. 7 Stanford	4	–	1	–	0	9	–	1	–	1
Oregon	3	–	1	–	0	7	–	2	–	0
Washington	3	–	4	–	0	5	–	4	–	0
Oregon State	2	–	3	–	0	7	–	3	–	0
Montana	1	–	3	–	0	5	–	3	–	0
California	1	–	4	–	0	4	–	5	–	0
UCLA	1	–	4	–	0	3	–	5	–	0
Idaho	0	–	5	–	0	4	–	7	–	0
$ – Conference champion; Rankings from Dickinson System

The 1930 Oregon State Beavers football team represented Oregon State College in the Pacific Coast Conference (PCC) during the 1930 college football season. In their seventh season under head coach Paul J. Schissler, the Beavers compiled a 7–3 record (2–3 against PCC opponents), finished in sixth place in the PCC, and outscored their opponents, 208 to 60.

The team played its home games at Bell Field in Corvallis, Oregon. As was the usual case for teams under coach Paul Schissler, there was no elected team captain.

== Schedule ==
Date	Opponent	Site	Result	Attendance	Source
September 20	Willamette*	Bell Field; Corvallis, OR	W 48–0		
September 27	Gonzaga*	Bell Field; Corvallis, OR	W 16–6	6,000	
October 4	at USC	Los Angeles Memorial Coliseum; Los Angeles, CA	L 7–27	60,000	
October 10	Cal Aggies*	Bell Field; Corvallis, OR	W 20–0		
October 18	at Stanford	Stanford Stadium; Stanford, CA	L 7–13	22,000	
October 25	Pacific (OR)*	Bell Field; Corvallis, OR	W 57–0		
November 1	Washington State	Multnomah Stadium; Portland, OR	L 7–14		
November 15	Oregon	Bell Field; Corvallis, OR (rivalry)	W 15–0		
November 21	at UCLA	Los Angeles Memorial Coliseum; Los Angeles, CA	W 19–0	12,000	
November 27	vs. West Virginia*	Soldier Field; Chicago, IL	W 12–0	20,000	
*Non-conference game

== Roster ==
Team photo of the 1930 Oregon State Beavers varsity football team
