= 1930 Montana Grizzlies football team =

American college football season

1930 Montana Grizzlies football
- Conference: Pacific Coast Conference
- Record: 5–3 (1–3 PCC)
- Head coach: Frank W. Milburn (5th season)
- Home stadium: Dornblaser Field

1930 Pacific Coast Conference football standings
	Conf.					Overall
Team	W		L		T	W		L		T
No. 2 Washington State $	6	–	0	–	0	9	–	1	–	0
No. 6 USC	5	–	1	–	0	8	–	2	–	0
No. 7 Stanford	4	–	1	–	0	9	–	1	–	1
Oregon	3	–	1	–	0	7	–	2	–	0
Washington	3	–	4	–	0	5	–	4	–	0
Oregon State	2	–	3	–	0	7	–	3	–	0
Montana	1	–	3	–	0	5	–	3	–	0
California	1	–	4	–	0	4	–	5	–	0
UCLA	1	–	4	–	0	3	–	5	–	0
Idaho	0	–	5	–	0	4	–	7	–	0
$ – Conference champion; Rankings from Dickinson System

The 1930 Montana Grizzlies football team represented the University of Montana in the 1930 college football season as a member of the Pacific Coast Conference (PCC). The Grizzlies were led by fifth-year head coach Frank W. Milburn, played their home games at Dornblaser Field and finished the season with a record of five wins and three losses (5–3, 1–3 PCC).

== Schedule ==
Date	Opponent	Site	Result	Attendance	Source
September 20	Anaconda Anodes*	Dornblaser Field; Missoula, MT	W 18–14		
September 27	Mount St. Charles*	Dornblaser Field; Missoula, MT	W 52–0		
October 4	at Washington	Husky Stadium; Seattle, WA	L 0–27	20,000	
October 18	vs. Montana State*	Clark Park; Butte, MT (rivalry)	W 13–6	7,500	
October 25	at Washington State	Rogers Field; Pullman, WA	L 0–61	5,000	
November 1	at California	California Memorial Stadium; Berkeley, CA	L 0–46	20,000	
November 8	at Gonzaga*	Gonzaga Stadium; Spokane, WA	W 27–15		
November 15	Idaho	Dornblaser Field; Missoula, MT (rivalry)	W 12–6		
*Non-conference game
