= 1930 New Mexico Lobos football team =

American college football season

1930 New Mexico Lobos football
- Conference: Independent
- Record: 4–5
- Head coach: Roy W. Johnson (11th season)
- Captains: Jack Fish; JAlfred Seery
- Home stadium: University Field

1930 Western college football independents records
| | Conf. | | | Overall |
| Team | W | L | T | W | | L | | T |
|---|---|---|---|---|---|---|---|---|
| Saint Mary's | | – | | 8 | – | 1 | – | 0 |
| Arizona | | – | | 6 | – | 1 | – | 1 |
| Santa Barbara State | | – | | 6 | – | 1 | – | 1 |
| Hawaii | | – | | 5 | – | 2 | – | 0 |
| Arizona State–Flagstaff | | – | | 4 | – | 2 | – | 1 |
| Columbia (OR) | | – | | 4 | – | 2 | – | 0 |
| Regis | | – | | 6 | – | 3 | – | 0 |
| San Francisco | | – | | 6 | – | 3 | – | 0 |
| New Mexico A&M | | – | | 5 | – | 3 | – | 0 |
| Santa Clara | | – | | 5 | – | 3 | – | 1 |
| New Mexico | | – | | 4 | – | 5 | – | 0 |
| Loyola (CA) | | – | | 2 | – | 3 | – | 1 |
| Arizona State | | – | | 3 | – | 5 | – | 1 |
| Gonzaga | | – | | 1 | – | 7 | – | 1 |
| Humboldt State | | – | | 0 | – | 6 | – | 0 |

The 1930 New Mexico Lobos football team represented the University of New Mexico as an independent during the 1930 college football season. In their 11th and final season under head coach Roy W. Johnson, the Lobos compiled a 4–5 record. Alfred Seery was the team captain. Tom Churchill was the assistant coach, and Jack McFarland was the freshman coach.

Johnson stepped down as football coach after the 1930 season, but he remained as the school's athletic director until 1949.

== Schedule ==
| Date | Opponent | Site | Result | Attendance | Source |
|---|---|---|---|---|---|
| October 4 | at Oklahoma | Owen Field; Norman, OK | L 0–47 | | |
| October 11 | New Mexico Normal | University Field; Albuquerque, NM | W 45–0 | | |
| October 18 | New Mexico Mines | University Field; Albuquerque, NM | W 51–0 | | |
| October 25 | at Arizona State–Flagstaff | Skidmore Field; Flagstaff, AZ | W 25–0 | | |
| November 1 | Texas Mines | University Field; Albuquerque, NM | L 13–20 | | |
| November 8 | New Mexico A&M^{†} | University Field; Albuquerque, NM (rivalry) | L 6–14 | | |
| November 15 | at Arizona | Arizona Stadium; Tucson, AZ (rivalry) | L 0–33 | | |
| November 22 | New Mexico Military | University Field; Albuquerque, NM | W 2–0 | | |
| November 29 | Wyoming | Albuquerque, NM | L 6–19 | 3,500 | |
^{†}Homecoming
