= 1930 Gonzaga Bulldogs football team =

American college football season

1930 Gonzaga Bulldogs football
- Conference: Independent
- Record: 1–7–1
- Head coach: Ray Flaherty (1st season)
- Home stadium: Gonzaga Stadium

1930 Western college football independents records
	Conf.			Overall
Team	W	L	T	W		L		T
Saint Mary's		–		8	–	1	–	0
Arizona		–		6	–	1	–	1
Santa Barbara State		–		6	–	1	–	1
Hawaii		–		5	–	2	–	0
Arizona State–Flagstaff		–		4	–	2	–	1
Columbia (OR)		–		4	–	2	–	0
Regis		–		6	–	3	–	0
San Francisco		–		6	–	3	–	0
New Mexico A&M		–		5	–	3	–	0
Santa Clara		–		5	–	3	–	1
New Mexico		–		4	–	5	–	0
Loyola (CA)		–		2	–	3	–	1
Arizona State		–		3	–	5	–	1
Gonzaga		–		1	–	7	–	1
Humboldt State		–		0	–	6	–	0

The 1930 Gonzaga Bulldogs football team was an American football team that represented Gonzaga University as an independent during the 1930 college football season. In their first and only year under head coach Ray Flaherty, the Bulldogs compiled a 1–7–1 record and was outscored by a total of 173 to 55.

== Schedule ==
Date	Opponent	Site	Result	Attendance	Source
September 27	at Oregon State	Bell Field; Corvallis, OR	L 6–16	> 6,000	
October 4	Ellensburg Normal	Gonzaga Stadium; Spokane, WA	T 0–0		
October 11	San Francisco	Gonzaga Stadium; Spokane, WA	L 12–13		
October 18	Washington State	Gonzaga Stadium; Spokane, WA	L 0–24	6,000–7,000	
October 26	Saint Mary's	Gonzaga Stadium; Spokane, WA	L 0–41	20,000	
November 1	at Idaho	MacLean Field; Moscow, ID (rivalry)	L 0–26	6,000	
November 11	Haskell	Gonzaga Stadium; Spokane, WA	L 7–19		
November 15	Montana	Gonzaga Stadium; Spokane, WA	L 15–27		
November 27	Olympic Club	Gonzaga Stadium; Spokane, WA	W 15–7		
