= 1930 Oregon Webfoots football team =

American college football season

1930 Oregon Webfoots football
- Conference: Pacific Coast Conference
- Record: 7–2 (3–1 PCC)
- Head coach: Clarence Spears (1st season)
- Captain: Johnny Kitzmiller
- Home stadium: Hayward Field

1930 Pacific Coast Conference football standings
	Conf.					Overall
Team	W		L		T	W		L		T
No. 2 Washington State $	6	–	0	–	0	9	–	1	–	0
No. 6 USC	5	–	1	–	0	8	–	2	–	0
No. 7 Stanford	4	–	1	–	0	9	–	1	–	1
Oregon	3	–	1	–	0	7	–	2	–	0
Washington	3	–	4	–	0	5	–	4	–	0
Oregon State	2	–	3	–	0	7	–	3	–	0
Montana	1	–	3	–	0	5	–	3	–	0
California	1	–	4	–	0	4	–	5	–	0
UCLA	1	–	4	–	0	3	–	5	–	0
Idaho	0	–	5	–	0	4	–	7	–	0
$ – Conference champion; Rankings from Dickinson System

The 1930 Oregon Webfoots football team represented the University of Oregon in the Pacific Coast Conference (PCC) during the 1930 college football season. In their first season under head coach Clarence Spears, the Webfoots compiled a 7–2 record (3–1 against PCC opponents), finished in fourth place in the PCC, and outscored their opponents, 131 to 35. The team played its home games at Hayward Field in Eugene, Oregon.

== Schedule ==
Date	Opponent	Site	Result	Attendance	Source
September 20	Pacific (OR)*	Hayward Field; Eugene, OR	W 20–0		
September 26	Willamette*	Hayward Field; Eugene, OR	W 51–0		
September 27	Linfield*	Hayward Field; Eugene, OR	W 6–0		
October 3	vs. Drake*	Soldier Field; Chicago, IL	W 14–7	12,000	
October 18	Washington	Multnomah Stadium; Portland, OR (rivalry)	W 7–0	35,266	
October 25	Idaho	Hayward Field; Eugene, OR	W 20–6		
November 8	UCLA	Hayward Field; Eugene, OR	W 7–0	6,500	
November 15	at Oregon State	Bell Field; Corvallis, OR (rivalry)	L 0–15		
November 27	at Saint Mary's*	Kezar Stadium; San Francisco, CA (rivalry)	L 6–7	27,000	
*Non-conference game
