= 1930 Santa Clara Broncos football team =

American college football season

1930 Santa Clara Broncos football
- Conference: Independent
- Record: 5–3–1
- Head coach: Clipper Smith (2nd season)
- Home stadium: Kezar Stadium

1930 Western college football independents records
	Conf.			Overall
Team	W	L	T	W		L		T
Saint Mary's		–		8	–	1	–	0
Arizona		–		6	–	1	–	1
Santa Barbara State		–		6	–	1	–	1
Hawaii		–		5	–	2	–	0
Arizona State–Flagstaff		–		4	–	2	–	1
Columbia (OR)		–		4	–	2	–	0
Regis		–		6	–	3	–	0
San Francisco		–		6	–	3	–	0
New Mexico A&M		–		5	–	3	–	0
Santa Clara		–		5	–	3	–	1
New Mexico		–		4	–	5	–	0
Loyola (CA)		–		2	–	3	–	1
Arizona State		–		3	–	5	–	1
Gonzaga		–		1	–	7	–	1
Humboldt State		–		0	–	6	–	0

The 1930 Santa Clara Broncos football team was an American football team that represented Santa Clara University as an independent during the 1930 college football season. In their second season under head coach Clipper Smith, the Broncos compiled a 5–3–1 record and outscored opponents by a total of 151 to 54.

== Schedule ==
Date	Opponent	Site	Result	Attendance	Source
September 20	at Cal Aggies	Sacramento Stadium; Sacramento, CA	W 27–0		
September 27	at California	California Memorial Stadium; Berkeley, CA	L 7–19	50,000	
October 4	at Stanford	Stanford Stadium; Stanford, CA	L 0–20	26,000	
October 11	at Nevada	Mackay Field; Reno, NV	T 0–0	5,000	
October 24	vs. Olympic Club	Kezar Stadium; San Francisco, CA	W 14–2	3,500	
November 2	vs. Saint Mary's	Kezar Stadium; San Francisco, CA	L 0–13	45,000	
November 16	at San Diego Marines	San Diego, CA	W 58–0		
November 22	at Loyola (CA)	Los Angeles Memorial Coliseum; Los Angeles, CA	W 32–0	3,000	
November 30	vs. San Francisco	Kezar Stadium; San Francisco, CA	W 13–0	15,000	
