= 1930 Arizona Wildcats football team =

American college football season

1930 Arizona Wildcats football
- Conference: Independent
- Record: 6–1–1
- Head coach: Pop McKale (16th season)
- Captains: W. Dicus; Bill Hargis
- Home stadium: Arizona Stadium

1930 Western college football independents records
	Conf.			Overall
Team	W	L	T	W		L		T
Saint Mary's		–		8	–	1	–	0
Arizona		–		6	–	1	–	1
Santa Barbara State		–		6	–	1	–	1
Hawaii		–		5	–	2	–	0
Arizona State–Flagstaff		–		4	–	2	–	1
Columbia (OR)		–		4	–	2	–	0
Regis		–		6	–	3	–	0
San Francisco		–		6	–	3	–	0
New Mexico A&M		–		5	–	3	–	0
Santa Clara		–		5	–	3	–	1
New Mexico		–		4	–	5	–	0
Loyola (CA)		–		2	–	3	–	1
Arizona State		–		3	–	5	–	1
Gonzaga		–		1	–	7	–	1
Humboldt State		–		0	–	6	–	0

The 1930 Arizona Wildcats football team represented the University of Arizona as an independent during the 1930 college football season. In their 16th and final season under head coach Pop McKale, the Wildcats compiled a 6–1–1 record, shut out six of eight opponents, and outscored all opponents, 122 to 33. The team captains were Waldo M. Dicus and William Hargis. The team played its home games at Arizona Stadium in Tucson, Arizona.

Senior halfback Bill "Eel" Hargis was the team's star player.

== Schedule ==
Date	Opponent	Site	Result	Attendance	Source
October 3	at Caltech	Rose Bowl; Pasadena, CA	W 26–12		
October 11	at Rice	Rice Field; Houston, TX	L 0–21		
October 18	Arizona State	Arizona Stadium; Tucson, AZ (rivalry)	W 6–0		
October 25	vs. Occidental	Phoenix, AZ	W 21–0		
November 1	Pomona^{†}	Arizona Stadium; Tucson, AZ	W 20–0		
November 8	at Texas Mines	El Paso High School Stadium; El Paso, TX	T 0–0		
November 15	New Mexico	Arizona Stadium; Tucson, AZ (rivalry)	W 33–0		
November 27	Colorado Agricultural	Arizona Stadium; Tucson, AZ	W 16–0	2,300	
^{†}Homecoming
