= 1930 Loyola Lions football team =

American college football season

1930 Loyola Lions football
- Conference: Independent
- Record: 2–3–1
- Head coach: Tom Lieb (1st season)
- Home stadium: Wrigley Field

1930 Western college football independents records
| | Conf. | | | Overall |
| Team | W | L | T | W | | L | | T |
|---|---|---|---|---|---|---|---|---|
| Saint Mary's | | – | | 8 | – | 1 | – | 0 |
| Arizona | | – | | 6 | – | 1 | – | 1 |
| Santa Barbara State | | – | | 6 | – | 1 | – | 1 |
| Hawaii | | – | | 5 | – | 2 | – | 0 |
| Arizona State–Flagstaff | | – | | 4 | – | 2 | – | 1 |
| Columbia (OR) | | – | | 4 | – | 2 | – | 0 |
| Regis | | – | | 6 | – | 3 | – | 0 |
| San Francisco | | – | | 6 | – | 3 | – | 0 |
| New Mexico A&M | | – | | 5 | – | 3 | – | 0 |
| Santa Clara | | – | | 5 | – | 3 | – | 1 |
| New Mexico | | – | | 4 | – | 5 | – | 0 |
| Loyola (CA) | | – | | 2 | – | 3 | – | 1 |
| Arizona State | | – | | 3 | – | 5 | – | 1 |
| Gonzaga | | – | | 1 | – | 7 | – | 1 |
| Humboldt State | | – | | 0 | – | 6 | – | 0 |

The 1930 Loyola Lions football team was an American football team that represented Loyola University of Los Angeles (now known as Loyola Marymount University) as an independent during the 1930 college football season. In their first season under head coach Tom Lieb, the Lions compiled a 2–3–1 record.

== Schedule ==
| Date | Opponent | Site | Result | Attendance | Source |
|---|---|---|---|---|---|
| October 4 | Pacific (CA) | Wrigley Field; Los Angeles, CA | W 7–0 | | |
| October 11 | Fresno State | Wrigley Field; Los Angeles, CA | L 7–12 | | |
| October 25 | San Francisco | Wrigley Field; Los Angeles, CA | L 0–14 | | |
| November 1 | Olympic Club | Wrigley Field; Los Angeles | T 0–0 | | |
| November 15 | Cal Aggies | Sacramento Stadium; Sacramento, CA | W 7–4 | | |
| November 22 | Santa Clara | Los Angeles Memorial Coliseum; Los Angeles, CA | L 0–32 | 3,000 | |
