= 1930 California Golden Bears football team =

American college football season

1930 California Golden Bears football
- Conference: Pacific Coast Conference
- Record: 4–5 (1–4 PCC)
- Head coach: Nibs Price (5th season)
- Captain: Carl Handy
- Home stadium: California Memorial Stadium

1930 Pacific Coast Conference football standings
	Conf.					Overall
Team	W		L		T	W		L		T
No. 2 Washington State $	6	–	0	–	0	9	–	1	–	0
No. 6 USC	5	–	1	–	0	8	–	2	–	0
No. 7 Stanford	4	–	1	–	0	9	–	1	–	1
Oregon	3	–	1	–	0	7	–	2	–	0
Washington	3	–	4	–	0	5	–	4	–	0
Oregon State	2	–	3	–	0	7	–	3	–	0
Montana	1	–	3	–	0	5	–	3	–	0
California	1	–	4	–	0	4	–	5	–	0
UCLA	1	–	4	–	0	3	–	5	–	0
Idaho	0	–	5	–	0	4	–	7	–	0
$ – Conference champion; Rankings from Dickinson System

The 1930 California Golden Bears football team was an American football team that represented the University of California, Berkeley during the 1930 college football season. Under head coach Nibs Price, the team compiled an overall record of 4–5 and 1–4 in conference.

== Schedule ==
Date	Opponent	Site	Result	Attendance	Source
September 27	Santa Clara*	California Memorial Stadium; Berkeley, CA	W 19–7	50,000	
October 4	Washington State	California Memorial Stadium; Berkeley, CA	L 0–16	25,000	
October 11	Saint Mary's*	California Memorial Stadium; Berkeley, CA	W 7–6	80,000	
October 18	Olympic Club*	California Memorial Stadium; Berkeley, CA	L 7–13		
October 25	at Washington	Husky Stadium; Seattle, WA	L 0–13	25,284	
November 1	Montana	California Memorial Stadium; Berkeley, CA	W 46–0	20,000	
November 8	at USC	Los Angeles Memorial Coliseum; Los Angeles, CA	L 0–74	82,000	
November 15	Nevada*	California Memorial Stadium; Berkeley, CA	W 8–0		
November 22	Stanford	California Memorial Stadium; Berkeley, CA (36th Big Game)	L 0–41	80,000	
*Non-conference game
