= 1930 Stanford football team =

American college football season

1930 Stanford football
- Conference: Pacific Coast Conference
- Record: 9–1–1 (4–1 PCC)
- Head coach: Pop Warner (7th season)
- Offensive scheme: Double-wing
- Home stadium: Stanford Stadium

1930 Pacific Coast Conference football standings
	Conf.					Overall
Team	W		L		T	W		L		T
No. 2 Washington State $	6	–	0	–	0	9	–	1	–	0
No. 6 USC	5	–	1	–	0	8	–	2	–	0
No. 7 Stanford	4	–	1	–	0	9	–	1	–	1
Oregon	3	–	1	–	0	7	–	2	–	0
Washington	3	–	4	–	0	5	–	4	–	0
Oregon State	2	–	3	–	0	7	–	3	–	0
Montana	1	–	3	–	0	5	–	3	–	0
California	1	–	4	–	0	4	–	5	–	0
UCLA	1	–	4	–	0	3	–	5	–	0
Idaho	0	–	5	–	0	4	–	7	–	0
$ – Conference champion; Rankings from Dickinson System

The 1930 Stanford football team represented Stanford University in the 1930 college football season. Their head coach was Pop Warner in his seventh season. Stanford played its home games at Stanford Stadium in Stanford, California.

On November 25, shortly before the team's final game against Dartmouth, a unanimous vote of the Executive Committee for the Associated Students chose "Indians" as the official mascot of Stanford's sports teams. "Indians" had been in use informally, but the vote formalized the use over "Cards" and "Cardinals", which were considered "not symbolical of Stanford spirit as that of 'Indians.'"

== Schedule ==
Date	Opponent	Site	Result	Attendance	Source
September 20	West Coast Army*	Stanford Stadium; Stanford, CA	W 32–0	15,000	
September 27	Olympic Club*	Stanford Stadium; Stanford, CA	W 18–0	14,000	
October 4	Santa Clara*	Stanford Stadium; Stanford, CA	W 20–0	26,000	
October 11	at Minnesota*	Memorial Stadium; Minneapolis, MN	T 0–0	45,000	
October 18	Oregon State	Stanford Stadium; Stanford, CA	W 13–7	22,000	
October 25	USC	Stanford Stadium; Stanford, CA (rivalry)	L 12–41	89,000	
October 31	at UCLA	Los Angeles Memorial Coliseum; Los Angeles, CA	W 20–0	30,000	
November 8	Washington	Stanford Stadium; Stanford, CA	W 25–7	22,000	
November 15	Caltech*	Stanford Stadium; Stanford, CA	W 57–7		
November 22	at California	California Memorial Stadium; Berkeley, CA (Big Game)	W 41–0	80,000	
November 29	Dartmouth*	Stanford Stadium; Stanford, CA	W 14–7	40,000	
*Non-conference game
