= 1930 Washington State Cougars football team =

American college football season

1930 Washington State Cougars football
- Visiting Herbert Hoover at White House, December 1, 1930

PCC champion

Rose Bowl, L 0–24 vs. Alabama
- Conference: Pacific Coast Conference
- Record: 9–1 (6–0 PCC)
- Head coach: Babe Hollingbery (5th season)
- Captain: Elmer Schwartz
- Home stadium: Rogers Field

1930 Pacific Coast Conference football standings
	Conf.					Overall
Team	W		L		T	W		L		T
No. 2 Washington State $	6	–	0	–	0	9	–	1	–	0
No. 6 USC	5	–	1	–	0	8	–	2	–	0
No. 7 Stanford	4	–	1	–	0	9	–	1	–	1
Oregon	3	–	1	–	0	7	–	2	–	0
Washington	3	–	4	–	0	5	–	4	–	0
Oregon State	2	–	3	–	0	7	–	3	–	0
Montana	1	–	3	–	0	5	–	3	–	0
California	1	–	4	–	0	4	–	5	–	0
UCLA	1	–	4	–	0	3	–	5	–	0
Idaho	0	–	5	–	0	4	–	7	–	0
$ – Conference champion; Rankings from Dickinson System

The 1930 Washington State Cougars football team was an American football team that represented Washington State College (now known as Washington State University) as a member of the Pacific Coast Conference (PCC) during the 1930 college football season. In their fifth season under head coach Babe Hollingbery, the Cougars compiled a 9–0 record in the regular season (6–0 in PCC games), won the PCC championship, shut out five opponents, and outscored all opponents by a total of 218 to 56. At the end of the regular season, the Cougars were ranked second nationally behind Notre Dame in the final Dickinson rankings. The Cougars represented the PCC in the 1931 Rose Bowl, losing to Alabama by a 24–0 score.

After defeating Villanova in the final game of the regular season in Philadelphia, the team traveled to Washington, D.C., where they were photographed (photo above right) with President Herbert Hoover at the White House.

Center Mel Hein and tackle Turk Edwards received first-team honors on the 1930 All-America team. Both were later inducted into the College and Pro Football Hall of Fames. Fullback Elmer Schwartz was the team captain.

Hein, Edwards, and Schwartz received first-team honors from both the Associated Press and United Press on the 1930 All-Pacific Coast football team. Halfback Carl "Tuffy" Ellingsen, end Lyle Maskell, and guard Jack Parodi received second-team honors.

The team played its home games at Rogers Field in Pullman, Washington.

== Schedule ==
Date	Opponent	Site	Result	Attendance	Source
September 27	College of Idaho*	Rogers Field; Pullman, WA	W 47–12	4,000	
October 4	at California	California Memorial Stadium; Berkeley, CA	W 16–0	25,000	
October 11	USC^{†}	Rogers Field; Pullman, WA	W 7–6	22,000	
October 18	at Gonzaga*	Gonzaga Stadium; Spokane, WA	W 24–0	6,000–7,000	
October 25	Montana	Rogers Field; Pullman, WA	W 61–0	5,000	
November 1	at Oregon State	Multnomah Stadium; Portland, OR	W 14–7	32,600	
November 8	at Idaho	MacLean Field; Moscow, ID (rivalry)	W 33–7	7,000	
November 15	at Washington	Husky Stadium; Seattle, WA (rivalry)	W 3–0	41,225	
November 29	at Villanova*	Franklin Field; Philadelphia, PA	W 13–0	20,000	
January 1, 1931	vs. Alabama*	Rose Bowl Stadium; Pasadena, CA (Rose Bowl)	L 0–24	60,000	
*Non-conference game; ^{†}Homecoming

== Personnel ==
=== Players ===
- Harold "Skogs" Ahlskog, tackle, Spokane, Washington
- Walter Camp, guard, LaCrosse, Washington
- Mentor Dahlen, quarterback, Spokane, Washington
- Myron Davis, halfback, Walla Walla, Washington
- Turk Edwards, tackle, Clarkston, Washington
- Carl "Tuffy" Ellingsen, halfback, Yakima, Washington
- Fred Garrett, guard, Kennewick, Washington
- Bill Goodwin, tackle, Tacoma, Washington
- Joe Hansen, center, Tacoma, Washington
- Sam Hansen, end, Tacoma, Washington
- Homer Hein, end, Burlington, Washington
- Mel Hein, center, Burlington, Washington
- George Hill, end, Dayton, Washington
- George Hurley, guard, San Francisco
- John Hurley, end, San Francisco
- V. Jackson, tackle, Long Beach, California
- DeWayne Johnson, fullback, St. Maries, Idaho
- Oscar "Stub" Jones, halfback, Chehalis, Washington
- Porter "Port" Lainhart, halfback, Goldendale, Washington
- Ray Luck, quarterback, Spokane, Washington
- Wilbur "Short" Luft, reserve quarterback, Endicott, Washington
- Lyle Maskell, end, Portland
- F. Mitchell, guard, Wapato, Washington
- Howard Morgan, center, Elma, Washington
- Howard Moses, halfback, Cashmere, Washington
- Jack Parodi, guard, Stockton, California
- George Sander, halfback, Wenatchee, Washington
- Emmett Schroeder, halfback, Mount Vernon, Washington
- Elmer Schwartz, fullback and captain, Port Orchard, Washington
- Clement Senn, guard, Tacoma, Washington
- Stan Shaw, reserve end, Yakima, Washington
- Arnold Soley, fullback, Everett, Washington
- William Tonkin, quarterback, Seattle
- Frank Wallulis, tackle, Cle Elum, Washington
- Harold Yap, guard, Honolulu

==== Gallery ====
Mel Hein

Turk Edwards

Elmer Schwartz

Harold Ahlskog

Carl Ellingsen

Lyle Maskell

=== Coaches and administrators ===
- Head coach: Babe Hollingbery
- Assistant coaches: Buck Bailey, Roy Sandberg
- Athletic director: Fred Bohler
- Trainer: Dr. Wilbur Bohm
