= 1930 USC Trojans football team =

American college football season

1930 USC Trojans football
- Conference: Pacific Coast Conference
- Record: 8–2 (5–1 PCC)
- Head coach: Howard Jones (6th season)
- Offensive scheme: Single-wing
- Captain: Marshall Duffield
- Home stadium: Los Angeles Memorial Coliseum

1930 Pacific Coast Conference football standings
	Conf.					Overall
Team	W		L		T	W		L		T
No. 2 Washington State $	6	–	0	–	0	9	–	1	–	0
No. 6 USC	5	–	1	–	0	8	–	2	–	0
No. 7 Stanford	4	–	1	–	0	9	–	1	–	1
Oregon	3	–	1	–	0	7	–	2	–	0
Washington	3	–	4	–	0	5	–	4	–	0
Oregon State	2	–	3	–	0	7	–	3	–	0
Montana	1	–	3	–	0	5	–	3	–	0
California	1	–	4	–	0	4	–	5	–	0
UCLA	1	–	4	–	0	3	–	5	–	0
Idaho	0	–	5	–	0	4	–	7	–	0
$ – Conference champion; Rankings from Dickinson System

The 1930 USC Trojans football team represented the University of Southern California (USC) during the 1930 college football season. Under head coach Howard Jones, in his sixth year, the Trojans compiled an impressive record of 8–2 (5–1 in the Pacific Coast Conference, finishing as runner-up), and outscored opponents 382 to 66.

== Schedule ==
Date	Opponent	Site	Result	Attendance	Source
September 27	at UCLA	Los Angeles Memorial Coliseum; Los Angeles, CA (Victory Bell)	W 52–0	40,000	
October 4	Oregon State	Los Angeles Memorial Coliseum; Los Angeles, CA	W 27–7	60,000	
October 11	at Washington State	Rogers Field; Pullman, WA	L 6–7	22,000	
October 18	Utah State*	Los Angeles Memorial Coliseum; Los Angeles, CA	W 65–0	25,000	
October 25	at Stanford	Stanford Stadium; Stanford, CA (rivalry)	W 41–12	89,000	
November 1	Denver*	Los Angeles Memorial Coliseum; Los Angeles, CA	W 33–13	18,000	
November 8	California	Los Angeles Memorial Coliseum; Los Angeles, CA	W 74–0	82,000	
November 15	Hawaii*	Los Angeles Memorial Coliseum; Los Angeles, CA	W 52–0	30,000	
November 27	Washington	Los Angeles Memorial Coliseum; Los Angeles, CA	W 32–0	45,000	
December 6	Notre Dame*^{†}	Los Angeles Memorial Coliseum; Los Angeles, CA (rivalry)	L 0–27	73,967	
*Non-conference game; ^{†}Homecoming
