= 1931 Rose Bowl =

American college football game

- 17th Rose Bowl Game
| Alabama Crimson Tide | Washington State Cougars |
| (9–0) | (9–0) |
| SoCon | PCC |
| 24 | 0 |
| Head coach: Wallace Wade | Head coach: Babe Hollingbery |
| | 1 | 2 | 3 | 4 | Total |
|---|---|---|---|---|---|
| Alabama | 0 | 21 | 3 | 0 | 24 |
| Washington State | 0 | 0 | 0 | 0 | 0 |
- Date: January 1, 1931
- Season: 1930
- Stadium: Rose Bowl
- Location: Pasadena, California
- MVP: John Campbell (QB) – Alabama
- Favorite: Alabama, 2 to 1 odds
- Referee: Bob Evans
- Attendance: 60,000

The 1931 Rose Bowl was the 17th Rose Bowl game, an American post-season college football game that was played on New Year's Day in Pasadena, California. It featured two undefeated teams, Alabama and Washington State.

Alabama scored three touchdowns in the second quarter and shut out the Cougars, 24–0.

== Game notes ==
For a psychological stunt, the WSC Cougars dressed all in red (helmets, jerseys, pants, socks, and shoes), according to the Pasadena Tournament of Roses.
