= 1930 Buffalo Bisons football team =

American college football season

1930 Buffalo Bisons football
- Conference: Independent
- Record: 3–5
- Head coach: Jay L. Lee (2nd season)
- Captain: Earl Riddall
- Home stadium: Bison Stadium, Rotary Field

1930 Eastern college football independents records
	Conf.			Overall
Team	W	L	T	W		L		T
Colgate		–		9	–	1	–	0
Fordham		–		8	–	1	–	0
No. 9 Army		–		9	–	1	–	1
No. 8 Dartmouth		–		7	–	1	–	1
St. John's		–		7	–	1	–	0
NYU		–		7	–	3	–	0
Cornell		–		6	–	2	–	0
Pittsburgh		–		6	–	2	–	1
Washington & Jefferson		–		6	–	2	–	1
Tufts		–		5	–	2	–	0
Temple		–		7	–	3	–	0
Bucknell		–		6	–	3	–	0
Carnegie Tech		–		6	–	3	–	0
Duquesne		–		6	–	3	–	0
Syracuse		–		5	–	2	–	2
Yale		–		5	–	2	–	2
CCNY		–		5	–	2	–	1
Brown		–		6	–	3	–	1
Drexel		–		6	–	3	–	1
Franklin & Marshall		–		5	–	3	–	1
Manhattan		–		4	–	3	–	1
Columbia		–		5	–	4	–	0
Penn		–		5	–	4	–	0
Boston College		–		5	–	5	–	0
Villanova		–		5	–	5	–	0
Penn State		–		3	–	4	–	2
Harvard		–		3	–	4	–	1
Providence		–		3	–	4	–	1
Princeton		–		1	–	5	–	1
Boston University		–		1	–	7	–	1
Vermont		–		1	–	7	–	1
Massachusetts		–		1	–	8	–	0
Rankings from Dickinson System

The 1930 Buffalo Bisons football team was an American football team that represented the University at Buffalo as an independent during the 1930 college football season. In its second and final season under head coach Jay L. Lee, the team compiled a 3–5 record. The team played its home games at Rotary Field in Buffalo, New York.

== Schedule ==
Date	Opponent	Site	Result	Source
September 27	Carnegie Tech	Bison Stadium; Buffalo, NY	L 2–75	
October 4	at Fordham	Fordham Field; Bronx, NY	L 0–71	
October 11	at Alfred	Merrill Field; Alfred, NY	L 0–20	
October 18	Hamilton	Rotary Field; Buffalo, NY	W 6–0	
October 25	at Clarkson	Potsdam, NY	L 6–14	
November 1	at Rochester	Rochester, NY	L 6–24	
November 8	Upsala	Rotary Field; Buffalo, NY	W 39–0	
November 15	Hobart	Rotary Field; Buffalo, NY	W 20–6	
