= 1930 Holy Cross Crusaders football team =

American college football season

1930 Holy Cross Crusaders football
- Conference: Independent
- Record: 8–2
- Head coach: John McEwan (1st season)
- Home stadium: Fitton Field

1930 Eastern college football independents records
	Conf.			Overall
Team	W	L	T	W		L		T
Colgate		–		9	–	1	–	0
Fordham		–		8	–	1	–	0
No. 9 Army		–		9	–	1	–	1
No. 8 Dartmouth		–		7	–	1	–	1
St. John's		–		7	–	1	–	0
NYU		–		7	–	3	–	0
Cornell		–		6	–	2	–	0
Pittsburgh		–		6	–	2	–	1
Washington & Jefferson		–		6	–	2	–	1
Tufts		–		5	–	2	–	0
Temple		–		7	–	3	–	0
Bucknell		–		6	–	3	–	0
Carnegie Tech		–		6	–	3	–	0
Duquesne		–		6	–	3	–	0
Syracuse		–		5	–	2	–	2
Yale		–		5	–	2	–	2
CCNY		–		5	–	2	–	1
Brown		–		6	–	3	–	1
Drexel		–		6	–	3	–	1
Franklin & Marshall		–		5	–	3	–	1
Manhattan		–		4	–	3	–	1
Columbia		–		5	–	4	–	0
Penn		–		5	–	4	–	0
Boston College		–		5	–	5	–	0
Villanova		–		5	–	5	–	0
Penn State		–		3	–	4	–	2
Harvard		–		3	–	4	–	1
Providence		–		3	–	4	–	1
Princeton		–		1	–	5	–	1
Boston University		–		1	–	7	–	1
Vermont		–		1	–	7	–	1
Massachusetts		–		1	–	8	–	0
Rankings from Dickinson System

The 1930 Holy Cross Crusaders football team was an American football team that represented the College of the Holy Cross as an independent during the 1930 college football season. In its first season under head coach John McEwan, the team compiled an 8–2 record. The team played its home games at Fitton Field in Worcester, Massachusetts.

== Schedule ==
Date	Opponent	Site	Result	Attendance	Source
September 27	St. Bonaventure	Fitton Field; Worcester, MA	W 30–0		
October 4	Providence	Fitton Field; Worcester, MA	W 27–0		
October 11	Catholic University	Fitton Field; Worcester, MA	W 27–6		
October 18	Fordham	Fitton Field; Worcester, MA	L 0–6		
October 25	at Brown	Brown Stadium; Providence, RI	L 0–13		
November 1	at Rutgers	Neilson Field; New Brunswick, NJ	W 32–20		
November 8	New River State	Fitton Field; Worcester, MA	W 13–0		
November 15	at Harvard	Harvard Stadium; Boston, MA	W 27–0	35,000	
November 22	Loyola (MD)	Fitton Field; Worcester, MA	W 32–0		
November 29	vs. Boston College	Fenway Park; Boston, MA (rivalry)	W 7–0		
