= 1930 Fordham Rams football team =

American college football season

1930 Fordham Rams football
- Conference: Independent
- Record: 8–1
- Head coach: Frank Cavanaugh (4th season)
- Captain: Anthony Siano
- Home stadium: Fordham Field, Polo Grounds, Yankee Stadium

1930 Eastern college football independents records
	Conf.			Overall
Team	W	L	T	W		L		T
Colgate		–		9	–	1	–	0
Fordham		–		8	–	1	–	0
No. 9 Army		–		9	–	1	–	1
No. 8 Dartmouth		–		7	–	1	–	1
St. John's		–		7	–	1	–	0
NYU		–		7	–	3	–	0
Cornell		–		6	–	2	–	0
Pittsburgh		–		6	–	2	–	1
Washington & Jefferson		–		6	–	2	–	1
Tufts		–		5	–	2	–	0
Temple		–		7	–	3	–	0
Bucknell		–		6	–	3	–	0
Carnegie Tech		–		6	–	3	–	0
Duquesne		–		6	–	3	–	0
Syracuse		–		5	–	2	–	2
Yale		–		5	–	2	–	2
CCNY		–		5	–	2	–	1
Brown		–		6	–	3	–	1
Drexel		–		6	–	3	–	1
Franklin & Marshall		–		5	–	3	–	1
Manhattan		–		4	–	3	–	1
Columbia		–		5	–	4	–	0
Penn		–		5	–	4	–	0
Boston College		–		5	–	5	–	0
Villanova		–		5	–	5	–	0
Penn State		–		3	–	4	–	2
Harvard		–		3	–	4	–	1
Providence		–		3	–	4	–	1
Princeton		–		1	–	5	–	1
Boston University		–		1	–	7	–	1
Vermont		–		1	–	7	–	1
Massachusetts		–		1	–	8	–	0
Rankings from Dickinson System

The 1930 Fordham Rams football team was an American football team that represented Fordham University as an independent during the 1930 college football season. In its fourth year under head coach Frank Cavanaugh, Fordham compiled an 8–1 record, shut out six of nine opponents, and outscored all opponents by a total of 215 to 29.

Fordham defeated its first two opponents by a total of 144 to 0. Its only loss was in a close match with a Saint Mary's team that also defeated UCLA and Oregon.

Four Fordham players received honors on the 1930 All-America team: guard Henry Wisniewski (UP-1; NEA-2; CP-1); halfback Cornelius Murphy (INS-1); center Tony Siano (AP-3, UP-2, CP-3); and tackle Frank Foley (AP-3).

== Schedule ==
Date	Opponent	Site	Result	Attendance	Source
September 27	Baltimore	Fordham Field; Bronx, NY	W 73–0		
October 4	Buffalo	Fordham Field; Bronx, NY	W 71–0		
October 13	at Boston College	Fenway Park; Boston, MA	W 3–0	30,000	
October 18	at Holy Cross	Fitton Field; Worcester, MA	W 6–0		
October 25	NYU	Yankee Stadium; Bronx, NY	W 7–0	78,500	
November 1	West Virginia	Polo Grounds; New York, NY	W 18–2	15,000	
November 8	at Detroit	University of Detroit Stadium; Detroit, MI	W 13–7		
November 15	Saint Mary's	Polo Grounds; New York, NY	L 12–20	35,000	
November 22	Bucknell	Polo Grounds; New York, NY	W 12–0	25,000	

== Players ==
- John Conroy, end
- Adam Elcewicz, end
- Jack Fisher, quarterback
- Frank Foley, tackle
- John Janis, back
- Bill McMahon, halfback
- Mike Miskinis, tackle
- Cornelius Murphy, halfback
- Charlie Pieculewicz, fullback
- Tony Siano, center and captain
- Walter Tracey, guard
- Henry Wisniewski, guard
