= 1930 Lafayette Leopards football team =

American football club

1930 Lafayette Leopards football

Middle Three champion
- Conference: Middle Three Conference
- Record: 5–3–1 (2–0 Middle Three)
- Head coach: Herb McCracken (7th season)
- Captain: Raymond Woodfin
- Home stadium: Fisher Field

1930 Middle Three Conference football standings
	Conf.					Overall
Team	W		L		T	W		L		T
Lafayette $	2	–	0	–	0	5	–	3	–	1
Rutgers	1	–	1	–	0	4	–	5	–	0
Lehigh	0	–	2	–	0	4	–	5	–	0
$ – Conference champion

The 1930 Lafayette Leopards football team was an American football team that represented Lafayette College in the Middle Three Conference during the 1930 college football season. In its seventh season under head coach Herb McCracken, the team compiled a 5–3–1 record. Raymond Woodfin was the team captain.

== Schedule ==
Date	Opponent	Site	Result	Source
September 27	St. Thomas (PA)*	Fisher Field; Easton, PA	W 7–0	
October 4	Muhlenberg*	Fisher Field; Easton, PA	W 13–0	
October 11	at Colgate*	Whitnall Field; Hamilton, NY	L 0–41	
October 18	Penn State*	Fisher Field; Easton, PA	T 0–0	
October 25	vs. Washington & Jefferson*	Convention Hall; Atlantic City, NJ	L 0–7	
November 1	Upsala*	Fisher Field; Easton, PA	W 74–0	
November 8	at Rutgers	Neilson Field; New Brunswick, NJ	W 31–26	
November 15	at Temple*	Temple Stadium; Philadelphia, PA	L 0–43	
November 22	Lehigh	Fisher Stadium; Easton, PA (rivalry)	W 16–6	
*Non-conference game
