= 1930 Marshall Thundering Herd football team =

American college football season

1930 Marshall Thundering Herd football
- Conference: West Virginia Athletic Conference
- Record: 3–5–1 (3–0–1 WVAC)
- Head coach: John Maulbetsch (2nd season)
- Captain: Tom Stark
- Home stadium: Fairfield Stadium

1930 West Virginia Athletic Conference football standings
	Conf.					Overall
Team	W		L		T	W		L		T
West Liberty State $	4	–	0	–	0	5	–	3	–	1
West Virginia Wesleyan	3	–	0	–	2	4	–	5	–	2
Marshall	3	–	0	–	1	3	–	5	–	1
Glenville State	5	–	1	–	1	5	–	1	–	2
New River State	3	–	1	–	1	5	–	2	–	1
Potomac State	2	–	1	–	1	4	–	3	–	1
Broaddus	2	–	2	–	3	2	–	4	–	3
Morris Harvey	1	–	3	–	2	2	–	5	–	2
Salem	1	–	5	–	1	2	–	6	–	1
Concord	0	–	3	–	1	1	–	5	–	2
Fairmont State	0	–	4	–	1	0	–	5	–	2
Davis & Elkins *	1	–	0	–	0	6	–	4	–	1
Shepherd *	1	–	1	–	0	2	–	3	–	1
Bethany (WV) *	0	–	2	–	0	0	–	8	–	0
Morehead State *	0	–	3	–	0	2	–	6	–	0
$ – Conference champion; * – Did not qualify for conference standings Ties did not count in conference standings.

The 1930 Marshall Thundering Herd football team was an American football team that represented Marshall College (now Marshall University) in the West Virginia Athletic Conference during the 1930 college football season. In its second season under head coach John Maulbetsch, the team compiled a 3–5–1 record, 3–0–1 against conference opponents, and was outscored by a total of 130 to 111. Tom Stark was the team captain.

== Schedule ==
Date	Opponent	Site	Result	Attendance	Source
September 27	at Ohio Wesleyan*	Selby Field; Delaware, OH	L 6–26		
October 4	Morris Harvey	Fairfield Stadium; Huntington, WV	W 7–0		
October 11	at Penn State*	New Beaver Field; State College, PA	L 0–65	5,000	
October 18	Bethany (WV)	Fairfield Stadium; Huntington, WV	W 37–0		
October 25	vs. Emory and Henry*	Bluefield, WV	L 0–13		
November 1	Wittenberg*	Fairfield Stadium; Huntington, WV	L 0–7		
November 7	at Fairmont State	Fairmont, WV	W 43–0		
November 15	Louisville*	Fairfield Stadium; Huntington, WV	L 12–13		
November 27	West Virginia Wesleyan^{†}	Fairfield Stadium; Huntington, WV	T 6–6		
*Non-conference game; ^{†}Homecoming
