= 1930 Rutgers Queensmen football team =

American college football season

1930 Rutgers Queensmen football
- Conference: Middle Three Conference
- Record: 4–5 (1–1 Middle Three)
- Head coach: Harry Rockafeller (4th season)
- Home stadium: Neilson Field

1930 Middle Three Conference football standings
	Conf.					Overall
Team	W		L		T	W		L		T
Lafayette $	2	–	0	–	0	5	–	3	–	1
Rutgers	1	–	1	–	0	4	–	5	–	0
Lehigh	0	–	2	–	0	4	–	5	–	0
$ – Conference champion

The 1930 Rutgers Queensmen football team represented Rutgers University in the 1930 college football season. In their fourth season under head coach Harry Rockafeller, the Queensmen compiled a 4–5 record and outscored their opponents 159 to 154.

== Schedule ==
Date	Opponent	Site	Result	Attendance	Source
September 27	Providence	Neilson Field; New Brunswick, NJ	L 6–12		
October 4	George Washington	Neilson Field; New Brunswick, NJ	W 20–6	6,500	
October 11	at Syracuse	Archbold Stadium; Syracuse, NY	L 0–27	12,000	
October 18	Johns Hopkins	Neilson Field; New Brunswick, NJ	W 33–0		
October 25	Delaware	Neilson Field; New Brunswick, NJ	W 40–0		
November 1	Holy Cross	Neilson Field; New Brunswick, NJ	L 20–32		
November 8	Lafayette	Neilson Field; New Brunswick, NJ	L 26–31		
November 15	at Lehigh	Taylor Stadium; Bethlehem, PA	W 14–13		
November 22	at NYU	Yankee Stadium; Bronx, NY	L 0–33	18,000	
