= 1930 Lehigh Brown and White football team =

American college football season

1930 Lehigh Brown and White football
- Conference: Middle Three Conference
- Record: 4–5 (0–2 Middle Three)
- Head coach: A. Austin Tate (3rd season)
- Captain: J. F. McLernon
- Home stadium: Taylor Stadium

1930 Middle Three Conference football standings
	Conf.					Overall
Team	W		L		T	W		L		T
Lafayette $	2	–	0	–	0	5	–	3	–	1
Rutgers	1	–	1	–	0	4	–	5	–	0
Lehigh	0	–	2	–	0	4	–	5	–	0
$ – Conference champion

The 1930 Lehigh Brown and White football team was an American football team that represented Lehigh University during the 1930 college football season. In its third season under head coach A. Austin Tate, the team compiled a 4–5 record. Lehigh played home games at Taylor Stadium in Bethlehem, Pennsylvania.

== Schedule ==
Date	Opponent	Site	Result	Attendance	Source
September 27	Ursinus*	Taylor Stadium; Bethlehem, PA	W 12–0		
October 4	Pennsylvania Military*	Taylor Stadium; Bethlehem, PA	W 25–0		
October 11	at Johns Hopkins*	Homewood Field; Baltimore, MD	W 19–12	6,000	
October 18	Gettysburg*	Taylor Stadium; Bethlehem, PA	L 0–14		
October 25	at Penn*	Franklin Field; Philadelphia, PA	L 0–40	25,000	
November 1	Muhlenberg*	Taylor Stadium; Bethlehem, PA	L 0–24		
November 8	at Princeton*	Palmer Stadium; Princeton, NJ	W 13–9	20,000	
November 15	Rutgers	Taylor Stadium; Bethlehem, PA	L 13–14		
November 22	at Lafayette	Fisher Field; Easton, PA (rivalry)	L 6–16	20,000	
*Non-conference game
