= 1930 Boston College Eagles football team =

American college football season

1930 Boston College Eagles football
- Conference: Independent
- Record: 5–5
- Head coach: Joe McKenney (3rd season)
- Captain: John Dixon
- Home stadium: Fenway Park

1930 Eastern college football independents records
	Conf.			Overall
Team	W	L	T	W		L		T
Colgate		–		9	–	1	–	0
Fordham		–		8	–	1	–	0
No. 9 Army		–		9	–	1	–	1
No. 8 Dartmouth		–		7	–	1	–	1
St. John's		–		7	–	1	–	0
NYU		–		7	–	3	–	0
Cornell		–		6	–	2	–	0
Pittsburgh		–		6	–	2	–	1
Washington & Jefferson		–		6	–	2	–	1
Tufts		–		5	–	2	–	0
Temple		–		7	–	3	–	0
Bucknell		–		6	–	3	–	0
Carnegie Tech		–		6	–	3	–	0
Duquesne		–		6	–	3	–	0
Syracuse		–		5	–	2	–	2
Yale		–		5	–	2	–	2
CCNY		–		5	–	2	–	1
Brown		–		6	–	3	–	1
Drexel		–		6	–	3	–	1
Franklin & Marshall		–		5	–	3	–	1
Manhattan		–		4	–	3	–	1
Columbia		–		5	–	4	–	0
Penn		–		5	–	4	–	0
Boston College		–		5	–	5	–	0
Villanova		–		5	–	5	–	0
Penn State		–		3	–	4	–	2
Harvard		–		3	–	4	–	1
Providence		–		3	–	4	–	1
Princeton		–		1	–	5	–	1
Boston University		–		1	–	7	–	1
Vermont		–		1	–	7	–	1
Massachusetts		–		1	–	8	–	0
Rankings from Dickinson System

The 1930 Boston College Eagles football team represented Boston College as an independent during the 1930 college football season. The Eagles were led by third-year head coach Joe McKenney and played their home games at Fenway Park in Boston. The team captain was John Dixon. Boston College finished the season with a record of 5–5.

== Schedule ==
Date	Time	Opponent	Site	Result	Attendance	Source
September 27		Catholic University	Fenway Park; Boston, MA	W 54–7		
October 6		Quantico Marines	Fenway Park; Boston, MA	W 13–7		
October 13		Fordham	Fenway Park; Boston, MA	L 0–3	30,000	
October 18		at Villanova	Philadelphia Municipal Stadium; Philadelphia, PA	L 0–7		
October 25	2:30 p.m.	Dayton	Fenway Park; Boston, MA	W 15–6		
November 1		Marquette	Fenway Park; Boston, MA	L 0–6	7,000	
November 8		Georgetown	Fenway Park; Boston, MA	L 19–20		
November 14		at Loyola (IL)	Loyola Stadium; Chicago, IL	W 19–0		
November 22	2:00 p.m.	Boston University	Fenway Park; Boston, MA (rivalry)	W 47–0		
November 29	1:45 p.m.	Holy Cross	Fenway Park; Boston, MA (rivalry)	L 0–7		
All times are in Eastern time
