= 1930 Carnegie Tech Tartans football team =

American college football season

1930 Carnegie Tech Tartans football
- Conference: Independent
- Record: 6–3
- Head coach: Walter Steffen (16th season)
- Home stadium: Pitt Stadium

1930 Eastern college football independents records
	Conf.			Overall
Team	W	L	T	W		L		T
Colgate		–		9	–	1	–	0
Fordham		–		8	–	1	–	0
No. 9 Army		–		9	–	1	–	1
No. 8 Dartmouth		–		7	–	1	–	1
St. John's		–		7	–	1	–	0
NYU		–		7	–	3	–	0
Cornell		–		6	–	2	–	0
Pittsburgh		–		6	–	2	–	1
Washington & Jefferson		–		6	–	2	–	1
Tufts		–		5	–	2	–	0
Temple		–		7	–	3	–	0
Bucknell		–		6	–	3	–	0
Carnegie Tech		–		6	–	3	–	0
Duquesne		–		6	–	3	–	0
Syracuse		–		5	–	2	–	2
Yale		–		5	–	2	–	2
CCNY		–		5	–	2	–	1
Brown		–		6	–	3	–	1
Drexel		–		6	–	3	–	1
Franklin & Marshall		–		5	–	3	–	1
Manhattan		–		4	–	3	–	1
Columbia		–		5	–	4	–	0
Penn		–		5	–	4	–	0
Boston College		–		5	–	5	–	0
Villanova		–		5	–	5	–	0
Penn State		–		3	–	4	–	2
Harvard		–		3	–	4	–	1
Providence		–		3	–	4	–	1
Princeton		–		1	–	5	–	1
Boston University		–		1	–	7	–	1
Vermont		–		1	–	7	–	1
Massachusetts		–		1	–	8	–	0
Rankings from Dickinson System

The 1930 Carnegie Tech Tartans football team represented the Carnegie Institute of Technology—now known as Carnegie Mellon University—as an independent during the 1930 college football season. Led by 16th-year head coach Walter Steffen, the Tartans compiled a record of 6–3. Carnegie Tech played home games at Pitt Stadium in Pittsburgh.

== Schedule ==
Date	Opponent	Site	Result	Attendance	Source
September 27	at Buffalo	Bison Stadium; Buffalo, NY	W 75–2		
October 4	Thiel	Pitt Stadium; Pittsburgh, PA	W 52–6		
October 11	Georgia Tech	Pitt Stadium; Pittsburgh, PA	W 31–0	40,000	
October 18	at Notre Dame	Notre Dame Stadium; Notre Dame, IN	L 6–21	30,009	
October 25	at Western Reserve	League Park; Cleveland, OH	W 40–8		
November 1	NYU	Pitt Stadium; Pittsburgh, PA	L 7–20	25,000	
November 8	at Pittsburgh	Pitt Stadium; Pittsburgh, PA	L 6–7	52,000	
November 22	at Temple	Franklin Field; Philadelphia, PA	W 32–13		
December 6	Washington & Jefferson	Pitt Stadium; Pittsburgh, PA	W 26–0	10,000	
