= 1930 Brown Bears football team =

American college football season

1930 Brown Bears football
- Conference: Independent
- Record: 6–3–1
- Head coach: Tuss McLaughry (5th season)
- Captain: W. L. Fogarty
- Home stadium: Brown Stadium

1930 Eastern college football independents records
	Conf.			Overall
Team	W	L	T	W		L		T
Colgate		–		9	–	1	–	0
Fordham		–		8	–	1	–	0
No. 9 Army		–		9	–	1	–	1
No. 8 Dartmouth		–		7	–	1	–	1
St. John's		–		7	–	1	–	0
NYU		–		7	–	3	–	0
Cornell		–		6	–	2	–	0
Pittsburgh		–		6	–	2	–	1
Washington & Jefferson		–		6	–	2	–	1
Tufts		–		5	–	2	–	0
Temple		–		7	–	3	–	0
Bucknell		–		6	–	3	–	0
Carnegie Tech		–		6	–	3	–	0
Duquesne		–		6	–	3	–	0
Syracuse		–		5	–	2	–	2
Yale		–		5	–	2	–	2
CCNY		–		5	–	2	–	1
Brown		–		6	–	3	–	1
Drexel		–		6	–	3	–	1
Franklin & Marshall		–		5	–	3	–	1
Manhattan		–		4	–	3	–	1
Columbia		–		5	–	4	–	0
Penn		–		5	–	4	–	0
Boston College		–		5	–	5	–	0
Villanova		–		5	–	5	–	0
Penn State		–		3	–	4	–	2
Harvard		–		3	–	4	–	1
Providence		–		3	–	4	–	1
Princeton		–		1	–	5	–	1
Boston University		–		1	–	7	–	1
Vermont		–		1	–	7	–	1
Massachusetts		–		1	–	8	–	0
Rankings from Dickinson System

The 1930 Brown Bears football team represented Brown University as an independent during the 1930 college football season. Led by fifth-year head coach Tuss McLaughry, the Bears compiled an overall record of 6–3–1.

== Schedule ==
Date	Opponent	Site	Result	Attendance	Source
September 27	Rhode Island State	Brown Stadium; Providence, RI (rivalry)	W 7–0		
October 4	WPI	Brown Stadium; Providence, RI	W 54–0		
October 11	at Princeton	Palmer Stadium; Princeton, NJ	W 7–0	35,000	
October 18	at Yale	Yale Bowl; New Haven, CT	L 0–21	40,000	
October 25	Holy Cross	Brown Stadium; Providence, RI	W 13–0		
November 1	at Syracuse	Archbold Stadium; Syracuse, NY	T 16–16	12,000	
November 8	Tufts	Brown Stadium; Providence, RI	W 32–7		
November 15	Columbia	Brown Stadium; Providence, RI	W 7–0		
November 22	New Hampshire	Brown Stadium; Providence, RI	L 0–7		
November 27	Colgate	Brown Stadium; Providence, RI	L 0–27		
