= Henry Wisniewski =

American football player and dentist (1908–1988)

Fordham Rams
- Position: Guard

Personal information
- Born: August 7, 1908; New Jersey, U.S.
- Died: October 28, 1988 (aged 80); Manahawkin, New Jersey, U.S.

Career information
- College: Fordham (1930)

Awards and highlights
- First-team All-American (1930)

Henry F. "Pete" Wisniewski (August 7, 1908 – October 28, 1988) was an American football player and dentist.

Wisniewski was an all-around athlete at Camden High School in Camden, New Jersey, lettering in football, basketball, baseball and track, before enrolling at Fordham University. He played at the guard position for the Fordham Rams football team. He was selected by the United Press, Central Press Association, and New York Evening Post as a first-team player on the 1930 College Football All-America Team.

After graduating from Fordham, Wisniewski played professional basketball and semiprofessional football. He later became a dentist. In 1987, he was inducted into the All-Time Fordham Sports Hall of Fame. A resident of Beach Haven, New Jersey, he died in 1988 at age 80.
