= Tony Siano =

American football player (1907–1986)

Profile
- Position: Center

Personal information
- Born: January 10, 1907; Waltham, Massachusetts, U.S.
- Died: April 1, 1986 (aged 79)

Career information
- College: Fordham

Career history
- 1932: Boston Braves
- 1934: Brooklyn Dodgers

Thomas Anthony Siano (January 10, 1907 – April 1, 1986) was an American football offensive lineman in the National Football League (NFL) for the Boston Braves and Brooklyn Dodgers. He played college football at Fordham University. Thomas was also the first Italian-American captain of the Waltham High School football team in Waltham, Massachusetts.
