= 1930 college football season =

American college football season

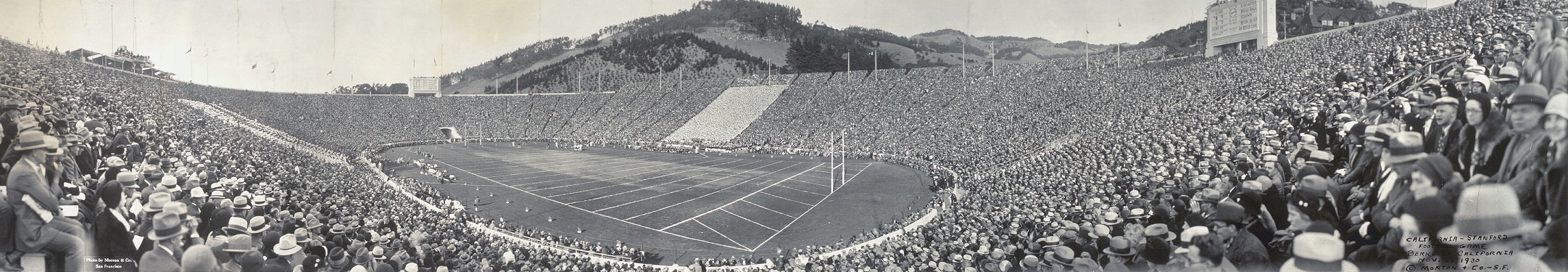
- California–Stanford football game at Berkeley, November 22
- Number of bowls: 1
- Bowl games: January 1, 1931
- Champion(s): Notre Dame (Note: per Boand System, Dickinson System (received Rissman Trophy), Dunkel System, Houlgate System, Erskine Trophy poll, Bonniwell Trophy vote, Billingsley Report, Helms Athletic Foundation, National Championship Foundation, Poling System); Alabama (Note: per Berryman QPRS, College Football Researchers Association, College Football Researchers Association, Parke H. Davis (Spalding's Official Foot Ball Guide), Sagarin Ratings Elo chess method, Sagarin Ratings Predictor method)

The 1930 college football season saw Notre Dame repeat as national champion under the Dickinson System, as well as claim the No. 1 position from each of the other three contemporary major selectors, (the Boand, Dunkel, and Houlgate Systems). The post-season Rose Bowl matchup featured two unbeaten (9–0) teams, Washington State and Alabama, ranked No. 2 and No. 3, respectively, by Dickinson. Alabama won the Pasadena contest, 24–0.

== Conference and program changes ==
=== Conference changes ===
- Three conferences played their first seasons in 1930:
  - Dixie Conference – the first of three conferences to share the Dixie Conference name; ended football sponsorship after 1941
  - Michigan-Ontario Collegiate Conference – minor conference with members in Michigan, Ohio, and the Canadian province of Ontario; ended football sponsorship after 1941
  - North State Conference – later known as Conference Carolinas; ended football sponsorship in 1973

=== Membership changes ===
School	1929 Conference	1930 Conference
Duke Blue Devils	Independent	SoCon

=== Program changes ===
- Stanford University football officially adopted the Indians nickname.

== September ==
September 20 Stanford opened its season against a non-college team, beating the West Coast Army club, 32–0

September 27 Nearly all the big schools scheduled tune-up games against weaker visitors, and all but one shut out the opposition. Michigan opened its season with a doubleheader, beating Denison 33–0 and Eastern Michigan 7–0. Other schools rolled up high scores, as Stanford beat the Olympic Club, 18–0; Army beat Boston University 39–0; Alabama beat Samford, 43–0; USC rolled over UCLA 52–0; Tennessee beat Maryville College 54–0; Dartmouth beat Norwich College 79–0; and Tulane defeated Lafayette College of Louisiana, 84–0. Only Washington State was scored upon, getting a surprise from the Coyotes of College of Idaho, which unleashed a surprise passing attack for two touchdowns (and 12 of 19 completions) in the fourth quarter. WSU won 47–12.

== October ==
October 4 Notre Dame opened its season with a 20–14 win over visiting Southern Methodist. Northwestern beat visiting Tulane, 14–0. Washington State won at California 16–0 and USC beat visiting Oregon State 27–7, while Stanford defeated Santa Clara 20–0. Dartmouth beat Bates 20–0 and Army beat Furman, 54–0. Alabama rolled over visiting Ole Miss, 64–0 and in Danville, Kentucky, Tennessee defeated Centre College 18–0. Michigan and Michigan State played to a scoreless tie.

October 11 Washington State edged visiting USC 7–6. Notre Dame beat Navy 26–2. Northwestern beat Ohio State 19–2, and Michigan narrowly won over Purdue 14–13. Dartmouth crushed visiting Boston University 74–0, and Army beat Swarthmore 39–0. Tennessee beat Ole Miss 27–0. In Birmingham, Alabama shut out Sewanee 25–0, and in Dallas, Tulane beat Texas A&M 19–9. In Minneapolis, Stanford and Minnesota played to a 0–0 tie.

October 18 Alabama and Tennessee, both 3–0–0, and both unscored upon, met at Tuscaloosa in a game that would ultimately determine the fictional championship of the South. Alabama won 18–6. Notre Dame beat Carnegie Tech 21–6. Northwestern won at Illinois 32–0 and Michigan won at Ohio State, 13–0 USC won at Utah State 65–0, Washington State won in Spokane at Gonzaga University, 24–0, and Stanford beat Oregon State 13–7. Dartmouth beat Columbia 52–0 and Army defeated Harvard, 6–0. Tulane defeated Birmingham Southern College 21–0

October 25 Alabama and Vanderbilt, both 4–0–0, met at Birmingham. In another close game, Alabama won 12–7. USC (3–1–0) and Stanford (3–0–1) met in Palo Alto, with the Trojans handing the Indians their first loss of the season, 41–12. Notre Dame won at Pittsburgh 35–19. Washington State beat visiting Montana, 61–0. Northwestern beat Centre College 45–7 and Michigan beat Illinois 15–7.(Dartmouth was scored upon, winning at Harvard 7–2, and Army's streak of shutouts ended with its 7–7 tie at Yale. Tennessee beat visiting North Carolina 9–7, and in Atlanta, Tulane shut out Georgia Tech 28–0.

== November ==
November 1 Dartmouth (5–0–0) and (3–1–1) Yale (3–1–1) played to a 0–0 tie in New Haven. Notre Dame beat Indiana 27–0 and Northwestern won at Minnesota 27–6 USC beat Denver, 33–13. Army defeated visiting North Dakota 33–6. In Portland, Washington State defeated Oregon State 14–7. Alabama won at Kentucky, 19–0, Tennessee beat Clemson 27–0 and Tulane beat Mississippi State 53–0

November 8 Notre Dame beat Pennsylvania 60–20. Washington State won at Idaho 33–7. Northwestern won at Indiana 25–0 and Michigan won at Harvard 6–3. Army defeated Illinois at Yankee Stadium, 13–0. USC beat California 74–0 and Stanford beat Washington 25–7 Alabama won at Florida, 20–0, Tulane beat Auburn 21–0, and Allegheny College did what no other team had done that season, scoring two touchdowns against Dartmouth; the Big Green won 43–14 to stay unbeaten. Tennessee shut out Carson-Newman College 34–0

November 15 Tennessee and Vanderbilt University, both 6–1–0, met at Nashville, with Tennessee winning 13–0. Notre Dame defeated Drake University 28–7. In Seattle, Washington State won another close one, beating Washington 3–0. Alabama beat LSU in a game at Montgomery, Alabama, 33–0, while Tulane (6–1–0) and Georgia (6–0–1) met at New Orleans, with Tulane handing the Bulldogs their first loss, 25–0 Northwestern beat Wisconsin 20–7 and Michigan beat Minnesota 7–0 USC defeated visiting Hawaii 52–0, while Stanford beat Caltech, 57–7 Dartmouth won at Cornell 19–13. Army beat Kentucky Wesleyan 47–2

November 22 Notre Dame and Northwestern, both unbeaten (7–0–0) met at Evanston, with the Fighting Irish winning 14–0. Michigan beat Chicago 16–0 Stanford won at California 41–0. Army defeated Ursinus College 18–0.

November 27, Thanksgiving Day, Alabama (8–0–0) met Georgia (6–1–1) in Birmingham. The Crimson Tide extended its unbeaten streak, 13–0, to close the regular season unbeaten. The champion of the South also earned a Rose Bowl invitation to face Washington State. USC beat Washington 32–0. Tennessee defeated Kentucky 8–0 and Tulane won over LSU, 12–7.

November 29 (8–0–0) Notre Dame and (8–0–1) Army met at Chicago, with the Irish narrowly winning 7–6. In Philadelphia, Washington State beat Villanova, 13–0, to close its season 9–0–0. (8–1–1)Stanford hosted (7–0–1) Dartmouth and won 14–7

== December ==
Although the Rose Bowl was the lone postseason game, and other bowl games were still four years in the future, several big contests were played after most colleges had completed their seasons.

December 6 In Los Angeles, a crowd of 90,000 turned out at the Coliseum as Notre Dame (9–0–0) visited USC (8–1–0). While some predicted a Trojans win, or at least a close game, "Rockne's Ramblers" scored six minutes into the game and never looked back. Paul O'Connor, a third string player earlier in the season, had 11 carries for 142 yards, and one touchdown. The Irish closed their season with a decisive 27–0 victory and with another victory over a tough opponent, finished first in the Dickinson ratings. Nobody realized at the time that Knute Rockne had coached his final game. Rockne was killed in a plane crash on March 31, 1931. At Jacksonville, Tennessee defeated Florida 13–6.

December 13 In the Army–Navy Game, played in New York, Army won 6–0 to close its season at 9–1–1.

== 1931 Rose Bowl ==
The Rose Bowl stadium's capacity had been increased to 81,000, but only 65,000 spectators turned out to watch an East-West matchup between two unbeaten (9–0–0), but out-of-state teams, the Washington State Cougars and the Alabama Crimson Tide. It was the Cougars who were decked out in crimson, however, in what reports of the day described as "a bizarre touch". Besides solid red jerseys, pants and socks, the WSU players had bright red leather helmets and shoes.

Freddie Sington, Bama's star tackle/linebacker, was pitted against WSU's Turk Edwards, and blocked WSU's only chance to score. In addition, Sington blocked for the rushing of Johnny Campbell, "The Mississippi Rabbit", who ran 42 yards for one of Alabama's three touchdowns in the second quarter. After a 21–0 halftime lead, Alabama went on to a 24–0 win.

== Conference standings ==
=== Major conference standings ===
1930 Big Six Conference football standings
	Conf.					Overall
Team	W		L		T	W		L		T
Kansas $	4	–	1	–	0	6	–	2	–	0
Oklahoma	3	–	1	–	1	4	–	3	–	1
Kansas State	3	–	2	–	0	5	–	3	–	0
Nebraska	2	–	2	–	1	4	–	3	–	2
Missouri	1	–	2	–	2	2	–	5	–	2
Iowa State	0	–	5	–	0	0	–	9	–	0
$ – Conference champion

1930 Rocky Mountain Conference football standings
	Conf.					Overall
Team	W		L		T	W		L		T
Utah $	7	–	0	–	0	8	–	0	–	0
Colorado	5	–	1	–	1	6	–	1	–	1
BYU	4	–	1	–	1	5	–	2	–	4
Denver	4	–	3	–	0	5	–	4	–	0
Colorado Agricultural	3	–	3	–	1	3	–	5	–	1
Montana State	1	–	1	–	0	6	–	3	–	0
Colorado Teachers	2	–	2	–	3	2	–	2	–	3
Utah State	3	–	4	–	1	3	–	5	–	1
Colorado College	2	–	4	–	2	2	–	4	–	2
Colorado Mines	1	–	4	–	0	1	–	5	–	0
Wyoming	1	–	5	–	1	2	–	5	–	1
Western State (CO)	0	–	5	–	0	0	–	6	–	0
$ – Conference champion

1930 Big Ten Conference football standings
	Conf.					Overall
Team	W		L		T	W		L		T
No. 5 Michigan +	5	–	0	–	0	8	–	0	–	1
No. 4 Northwestern +	5	–	0	–	0	7	–	1	–	0
Purdue	4	–	2	–	0	6	–	2	–	0
Wisconsin	2	–	2	–	1	6	–	2	–	1
Ohio State	2	–	2	–	1	5	–	2	–	1
Minnesota	1	–	3	–	0	3	–	4	–	1
Indiana	1	–	3	–	0	2	–	5	–	1
Illinois	1	–	4	–	0	3	–	5	–	0
Iowa	0	–	1	–	0	4	–	4	–	0
Chicago	0	–	4	–	0	2	–	5	–	2
+ – Conference co-champions; Rankings from Dickinson System

1930 Southern Conference football standings
	Conf.					Overall
Team	W		L		T	W		L		T
No. 3 Alabama +	8	–	0	–	0	10	–	0	–	0
No. 11 Tulane +	5	–	0	–	0	8	–	1	–	0
No. 10 Tennessee	6	–	1	–	0	9	–	1	–	0
Duke	4	–	1	–	1	8	–	1	–	2
Vanderbilt	5	–	2	–	0	8	–	2	–	0
Maryland	4	–	2	–	0	7	–	5	–	0
Florida	4	–	2	–	1	6	–	3	–	1
North Carolina	4	–	2	–	2	5	–	3	–	2
Clemson	3	–	2	–	0	8	–	2	–	0
Georgia	3	–	2	–	1	7	–	2	–	1
Kentucky	4	–	3	–	0	5	–	3	–	0
South Carolina	4	–	3	–	0	6	–	4	–	0
VPI	2	–	3	–	1	5	–	3	–	1
Mississippi A&M	2	–	3	–	0	2	–	7	–	0
Georgia Tech	2	–	4	–	1	2	–	6	–	1
LSU	2	–	4	–	0	6	–	4	–	0
Virginia	2	–	5	–	0	4	–	6	–	0
Sewanee	1	–	4	–	0	3	–	6	–	1
NC State	1	–	5	–	0	2	–	8	–	0
Ole Miss	1	–	5	–	0	3	–	5	–	1
Auburn	1	–	6	–	0	3	–	7	–	0
Washington and Lee	0	–	4	–	1	3	–	6	–	1
VMI	0	–	5	–	0	3	–	6	–	0
+ – Conference co-champions; Rankings from Dickinson System

1930 Pacific Coast Conference football standings
	Conf.					Overall
Team	W		L		T	W		L		T
No. 2 Washington State $	6	–	0	–	0	9	–	1	–	0
No. 6 USC	5	–	1	–	0	8	–	2	–	0
No. 7 Stanford	4	–	1	–	0	9	–	1	–	1
Oregon	3	–	1	–	0	7	–	2	–	0
Washington	3	–	4	–	0	5	–	4	–	0
Oregon State	2	–	3	–	0	7	–	3	–	0
Montana	1	–	3	–	0	5	–	3	–	0
California	1	–	4	–	0	4	–	5	–	0
UCLA	1	–	4	–	0	3	–	5	–	0
Idaho	0	–	5	–	0	4	–	7	–	0
$ – Conference champion; Rankings from Dickinson System

1930 Southwest Conference football standings
	Conf.					Overall
Team	W		L		T	W		L		T
Texas $	4	–	1	–	0	8	–	1	–	1
Baylor	3	–	1	–	1	6	–	3	–	1
TCU	4	–	2	–	0	9	–	2	–	1
SMU	2	–	2	–	1	6	–	3	–	1
Arkansas	2	–	2	–	0	3	–	6	–	0
Rice	2	–	4	–	0	8	–	4	–	0
Texas A&M	0	–	5	–	0	2	–	7	–	0
$ – Conference champion

=== Independents ===
1930 Eastern college football independents records
	Conf.			Overall
Team	W	L	T	W		L		T
Colgate		–		9	–	1	–	0
Fordham		–		8	–	1	–	0
No. 9 Army		–		9	–	1	–	1
No. 8 Dartmouth		–		7	–	1	–	1
St. John's		–		7	–	1	–	0
NYU		–		7	–	3	–	0
Cornell		–		6	–	2	–	0
Pittsburgh		–		6	–	2	–	1
Washington & Jefferson		–		6	–	2	–	1
Tufts		–		5	–	2	–	0
Temple		–		7	–	3	–	0
Bucknell		–		6	–	3	–	0
Carnegie Tech		–		6	–	3	–	0
Duquesne		–		6	–	3	–	0
Syracuse		–		5	–	2	–	2
Yale		–		5	–	2	–	2
CCNY		–		5	–	2	–	1
Brown		–		6	–	3	–	1
Drexel		–		6	–	3	–	1
Franklin & Marshall		–		5	–	3	–	1
Manhattan		–		4	–	3	–	1
Columbia		–		5	–	4	–	0
Penn		–		5	–	4	–	0
Boston College		–		5	–	5	–	0
Villanova		–		5	–	5	–	0
Penn State		–		3	–	4	–	2
Harvard		–		3	–	4	–	1
Providence		–		3	–	4	–	1
Princeton		–		1	–	5	–	1
Boston University		–		1	–	7	–	1
Vermont		–		1	–	7	–	1
Massachusetts		–		1	–	8	–	0
Rankings from Dickinson System

1930 Midwestern college football independents records
	Conf.			Overall
Team	W	L	T	W		L		T
No. 1 Notre Dame		–		10	–	0	–	0
Marquette		–		8	–	0	–	1
Haskell		–		9	–	1	–	0
Michigan State		–		5	–	1	–	2
DePaul		–		4	–	2	–	1
Detroit		–		5	–	3	–	2
Kent State		–		3	–	3	–	1
Saint Louis		–		3	–	3	–	2
John Carroll		–		3	–	5	–	2
Loyola (IL)		–		2	–	6	–	1
Michigan Tech		–		1	–	5	–	0
Rankings from Dickinson System

1930 Southern college football independents records
	Conf.			Overall
Team	W	L	T	W		L		T
Western Maryland		–		9	–	0	–	1
Texas Mines		–		7	–	1	–	1
Appalachian State		–		8	–	2	–	1
William & Mary Norfolk		–		3	–	1	–	0
Delaware		–		6	–	3	–	1
Furman		–		6	–	3	–	1
Delaware State		–		4	–	2	–	0
Wake Forest		–		5	–	3	–	1
Jacksonville State		–		4	–	3	–	1
Davidson		–		6	–	4	–	0
Navy		–		6	–	5	–	0
Middle Tennessee State Teachers		–		5	–	5	–	1
West Virginia		–		5	–	5	–	0
George Washington		–		4	–	4	–	1
Oglethorpe		–		4	–	4	–	1
Georgetown		–		5	–	5	–	0
South Georgia Teachers		–		3	–	4	–	2
Mississippi State Teachers		–		3	–	5	–	1
Texas Tech		–		3	–	6	–	0
Troy State		–		1	–	2	–	0
Jefferson (TX)		–		1	–	3	–	0
Beacom College		–		1	–	5	–	1
Catholic University		–		1	–	8	–	0

1930 Western college football independents records
	Conf.			Overall
Team	W	L	T	W		L		T
Saint Mary's		–		8	–	1	–	0
Arizona		–		6	–	1	–	1
Santa Barbara State		–		6	–	1	–	1
Hawaii		–		5	–	2	–	0
Arizona State–Flagstaff		–		4	–	2	–	1
Columbia (OR)		–		4	–	2	–	0
Regis		–		6	–	3	–	0
San Francisco		–		6	–	3	–	0
New Mexico A&M		–		5	–	3	–	0
Santa Clara		–		5	–	3	–	1
New Mexico		–		4	–	5	–	0
Loyola (CA)		–		2	–	3	–	1
Arizona State		–		3	–	5	–	1
Gonzaga		–		1	–	7	–	1
Humboldt State		–		0	–	6	–	0

=== Minor conferences ===
Conference	Champion(s)	Record
Big Four Conference	Tulsa	3–0
Central Intercollegiate Athletics Association	Morgan College	6–1
Central Intercollegiate Athletic Conference	Washburn	6–0
Far Western Conference	Fresno State Normal	5–0
Iowa Intercollegiate Athletic Conference	Iowa Wesleyan; William Penn	4–0–1; 5–0–3
Kansas Collegiate Athletic Conference	St. Mary's (KS)	5–0
Michigan Intercollegiate Athletic Association	Alma; Kalamazoo	4–1
Michigan-Ontario Collegiate Conference	Adrian	—
Midwest Collegiate Athletic Conference	Coe	2–0–2
Minnesota Intercollegiate Athletic Conference	Saint Olaf; Saint Thomas (MN)	5–0; 4–0
Missouri Intercollegiate Athletic Association	Northeast Missouri State Teachers	3–0
Nebraska College Athletic Conference	Cotner College	—
Nebraska Intercollegiate Athletic Association	Nebraska State Teachers	—
North Central Intercollegiate Athletic Conference	North Dakota	4–0
Ohio Athletic Conference	Muskingum	3–0–1
Oklahoma Collegiate Athletic Conference	East Central State Normal	4–0
Pacific Northwest Conference	Whitman	4–0–1
South Dakota Intercollegiate Conference	Black Hills Teachers	—
Southern California Intercollegiate Athletic Conference	Caltech	4–0
Southwestern Athletic Conference	Wiley (TX)	4–0
Texas Collegiate Athletic Conference	Howard Payne	4–0–1
Texas Intercollegiate Athletic Association	Sam Houston State Teachers	5–0
Tri-Normal League	Unknown	—
Wisconsin State Teachers College Conference	Milwaukee State Teachers	4–0

=== Minor conference standings ===
1930 Big Four Conference (Oklahoma) football standings
	Conf.					Overall
Team	W		L		T	W		L		T
Tulsa $	3	–	0	–	0	7	–	2	–	0
Oklahoma City	2	–	1	–	0	9	–	1	–	0
Phillips	1	–	2	–	0	6	–	3	–	0
Oklahoma Baptist	0	–	3	–	0	4	–	5	–	0
$ – Conference champion

1930 Buckeye Athletic Association football standings
	Conf.					Overall
Team	W		L		T	W		L		T
Ohio $	4	–	0	–	0	8	–	0	–	1
Ohio Wesleyan	3	–	1	–	0	5	–	4	–	0
Cincinnati	2	–	2	–	0	5	–	4	–	0
Miami (OH)	1	–	3	–	0	4	–	4	–	1
Denison	0	–	4	–	0	2	–	7	–	0
$ – Conference champion

1930 Central Intercollegiate Conference football standings
	Conf.					Overall
Team	W		L		T	W		L		T
Washburn $	6	–	0	–	0	7	–	2	–	0
Wichita	4	–	1	–	1	6	–	3	–	1
Emporia Teachers	2	–	1	–	3	4	–	2	–	3
Pittsburg State	3	–	3	–	0	5	–	3	–	0
Hays Teachers	1	–	4	–	1	2	–	5	–	2
Southwestern (KS)	1	–	4	–	1	2	–	5	–	1
College of Emporia	0	–	4	–	2	0	–	7	–	2
$ – Conference champion

1930 Colored Intercollegiate Athletic Association football standings
	Conf.					Overall
Team	W		L		T	W		L		T
Morgan $	7	–	1	–	0	8	–	1	–	0
Virginia Union	5	–	1	–	2	6	–	1	–	2
Virginia State	4	–	1	–	2	4	–	3	–	2
Hampton	4	–	2	–	1	6	–	2	–	1
Johnson C. Smith	2	–	1	–	3	4	–	2	–	4
Howard	3	–	2	–	1	4	–	3	–	1
Lincoln (PA)	4	–	3	–	1	4	–	3	–	1
North Carolina A&T	3	–	5	–	1	3	–	5	–	1
North Carolina College	2	–	5	–	1	3	–	6	–	1
Saint Paul's (VA)	2	–	5	–	1	3	–	5	–	1
Shaw	0	–	4	–	1	3	–	5	–	1
Virginia Seminary	0	–	6	–	0	1	–	6	–	0
$ – Conference champion

1930 Eastern Pennsylvania Collegiate Conference football standings
	Conf.					Overall
Team	W		L		T	W		L		T
Ursinus $	3	–	1	–	0	6	–	3	–	0
Franklin & Marshall	2	–	1	–	1	5	–	3	–	1
Muhlenberg	2	–	1	–	1	5	–	4	–	1
Gettysburg	2	–	2	–	0	6	–	3	–	0
Dickinson	0	–	4	–	0	0	–	6	–	2
$ – Conference champion

1930 Far Western Conference football standings
	Conf.					Overall
Team	W		L		T	W		L		T
Fresno State $	5	–	0	–	0	8	–	0	–	0
Nevada	2	–	1	–	0	2	–	4	–	2
Pacific (CA)	2	–	2	–	0	3	–	6	–	0
San Jose State	1	–	2	–	1	2	–	3	–	3
Chico State	0	–	2	–	0	3	–	4	–	0
Cal Aggies	0	–	3	–	1	0	–	7	–	1
$ – Conference champion

1930 Illinois Intercollegiate Athletic Conference football standings
	Conf.					Overall
Team	W		L		T	W		L		T
Southern Illinois +	5	–	0	–	0	9	–	0	–	0
Millikin +	4	–	0	–	0	5	–	2	–	0
Mount Morris +	3	–	0	–	0	9	–	0	–	0
Eastern Illinois	5	–	1	–	1	6	–	1	–	1
Northern Illinois State	4	–	1	–	1	6	–	2	–	1
Knox (IL)	4	–	1	–	0	5	–	2	–	1
Monmouth (IL)	5	–	2	–	0	5	–	4	–	0
Lake Forest	2	–	1	–	0	5	–	1	–	1
Illinois Wesleyan	4	–	2	–	0	6	–	2	–	0
Elmhurst	3	–	2	–	0	6	–	2	–	0
Augustana (IL)	3	–	2	–	0	4	–	3	–	0
North Central	2	–	2	–	1	6	–	2	–	1
Bradley	2	–	2	–	1	4	–	3	–	1
Carthage	3	–	3	–	0	3	–	4	–	1
Western Illinois	3	–	4	–	0	4	–	4	–	0
Shurtleff	2	–	3	–	0	6	–	4	–	0
St. Viator	3	–	5	–	0	3	–	6	–	0
Eureka	2	–	6	–	0	2	–	6	–	0
Illinois State Normal	1	–	7	–	0	1	–	7	–	0
Wheaton (IL)	0	–	4	–	0	2	–	6	–	0
McKendree	0	–	5	–	0	3	–	6	–	0
Illinois College	0	–	7	–	0	0	–	8	–	0
+ – Conference co-champions

1930 Indiana Intercollegiate Conference football standings
	Conf.					Overall
Team	W		L		T	W		L		T
DePauw $	5	–	0	–	0	6	–	1	–	0
Butler	2	–	0	–	0	2	–	7	–	0
Rose Poly	7	–	1	–	0	7	–	1	–	0
Ball State	6	–	1	–	0	6	–	1	–	0
Manchester	5	–	1	–	0	6	–	2	–	0
Indiana State	5	–	1	–	1	5	–	3	–	1
Evansville	3	–	1	–	1	3	–	3	–	1
Franklin (IN)	3	–	4	–	1	3	–	4	–	1
Wabash	2	–	5	–	0	3	–	6	–	0
Valparaiso	1	–	3	–	0	5	–	4	–	0
Indiana Central	2	–	7	–	0	2	–	7	–	0
Oakland City	1	–	5	–	1	1	–	5	–	1
Hanover	0	–	2	–	2	1	–	4	–	2
Earlham	0	–	5	–	1	1	–	5	–	1
Central Normal	0	–	6	–	1	0	–	6	–	1
$ – Conference champion

1930 Interstate Athletic Conference football standings
	Conf.					Overall
Team	W		L		T	W		L		T
Moorhead State $	4	–	0	–	0	5	–	1	–	1
Wahpeton	4	–	2	–	0	?	–	?	–	?
Dickinson State	2	–	1	–	0	3	–	3	–	0
Minot State	3	–	2	–	0	4	–	2	–	0
Valley City State	3	–	2	–	0	3	–	3	–	0
Jamestown	2	–	3	–	0	3	–	4	–	0
Park Region	1	–	2	–	0	?	–	?	–	?
Mayville State	1	–	3	–	0	?	–	?	–	?
Ellendale	0	–	5	–	0	?	–	?	–	?
$ – Conference champion

1930 Iowa Conference football standings
	Conf.					Overall
Team	W		L		T	W		L		T
Penn (IA) +	5	–	0	–	3	6	–	0	–	3
Iowa Wesleyan +	4	–	0	–	1	6	–	2	–	2
Morningside	2	–	0	–	0	7	–	2	–	0
Luther	5	–	1	–	0	5	–	3	–	0
Columbia (IA)	4	–	2	–	0	4	–	3	–	0
Iowa State Teachers	2	–	1	–	1	2	–	5	–	1
Simpson (IA)	3	–	2	–	1	3	–	5	–	1
Central (IA)	3	–	2	–	0	6	–	2	–	0
Buena Vista	2	–	3	–	0	4	–	5	–	0
Upper Iowa	2	–	4	–	0	2	–	4	–	1
St. Ambrose	2	–	5	–	0	2	–	7	–	0
Western Union	0	–	4	–	0	0	–	8	–	0
Dubuque	0	–	5	–	0	2	–	5	–	0
Parsons	0	–	5	–	0	0	–	8	–	0
+ – Conference co-champions

1930 Kansas Collegiate Athletic Conference football standings
	Conf.					Overall
Team	W		L		T	W		L		T
St. Mary's (KS) $	5	–	0	–	0	6	–	3	–	0
Baker	4	–	1	–	0	5	–	4	–	0
Kansas Wesleyan	2	–	2	–	1	4	–	3	–	2
Bethany (KS)	2	–	2	–	1	3	–	4	–	2
Ottawa	0	–	4	–	0	1	–	6	–	0
McPherson	0	–	4	–	0	1	–	7	–	0
$ – Conference champion

1930 Michigan Collegiate Conference football standings
	Conf.					Overall
Team	W		L		T	W		L		T
Michigan State Normal $	3	–	0	–	0	6	–	1	–	0
Western State Teachers	2	–	1	–	0	5	–	1	–	1
Central State (MI)	1	–	2	–	0	6	–	2	–	0
Detroit City College	0	–	3	–	0	0	–	9	–	0
$ – Conference champion

1930 Michigan Intercollegiate Athletic Association football standings
	Conf.					Overall
Team	W		L		T	W		L		T
Alma +	4	–	1	–	0	5	–	3	–	0
Kalamazoo +	4	–	1	–	0	5	–	3	–	0
Hillsdale	3	–	2	–	0	5	–	3	–	0
Albion	3	–	2	–	0	4	–	4	–	0
Olivet	1	–	4	–	0	3	–	4	–	1
Hope	0	–	5	–	0	0	–	6	–	0
+ – Conference co-champions

1930 Middle Three Conference football standings
	Conf.					Overall
Team	W		L		T	W		L		T
Lafayette $	2	–	0	–	0	5	–	3	–	1
Rutgers	1	–	1	–	0	4	–	5	–	0
Lehigh	0	–	2	–	0	4	–	5	–	0
$ – Conference champion

1930 Midwest Conference football standings
	Conf.					Overall
Team	W		L		T	W		L		T
Coe $	2	–	0	–	2	6	–	0	–	2
Cornell (IA)	3	–	1	–	1	3	–	4	–	1
Knox	2	–	1	–	1	5	–	2	–	1
Ripon	2	–	1	–	0	2	–	5	–	0
Lawrence	2	–	2	–	0	3	–	5	–	0
Carleton	1	–	1	–	0	3	–	4	–	0
Monmouth (IL)	0	–	3	–	0	5	–	4	–	0
Beloit	0	–	3	–	0	1	–	6	–	0
$ – Conference champion

1930 Minnesota Intercollegiate Athletic Conference football standings
	Conf.					Overall
Team	W		L		T	W		L		T
St. Olaf +	5	–	0	–	0	8	–	0	–	0
St. Thomas (MN) +	4	–	0	–	0	6	–	2	–	0
Gustavus Adolphus	3	–	2	–	0	6	–	2	–	0
Macalester	3	–	2	–	0	5	–	2	–	0
Concordia (MN)	2	–	2	–	0	4	–	3	–	1
Saint John's (MN)	0	–	3	–	1	1	–	4	–	1
Augsburg	0	–	4	–	0	1	–	4	–	1
Hamline	0	–	4	–	1	0	–	6	–	1
+ – Conference co-champions

1930 Missouri College Athletic Union football standings
	Conf.					Overall
Team	W		L		T	W		L		T
Central (MO) $	6	–	0	–	0	9	–	0	–	0
Missouri Mines	3	–	0	–	0	5	–	1	–	1
William Jewell	2	–	2	–	0	2	–	5	–	1
Missouri Valley	2	–	3	–	0	4	–	4	–	1
Westminster (MO)	2	–	3	–	0	4	–	5	–	0
Drury	1	–	4	–	0	1	–	7	–	0
Culver–Stockton	0	–	1	–	1	4	–	2	–	1
Tarkio	0	–	3	–	1	1	–	5	–	3
$ – Conference champion

1930 Missouri Intercollegiate Athletic Association football standings
	Conf.					Overall
Team	W		L		T	W		L		T
Kirksville $	3	–	0	–	0	5	–	5	–	0
Maryville (MO)	3	–	1	–	0	4	–	5	–	1
Springfield (MO)	2	–	2	–	0	4	–	5	–	0
Cape Girardeau	0	–	2	–	0	1	–	6	–	1
Warrensburg	0	–	3	–	0	4	–	4	–	1
$ – Conference champion

1930 Missouri Valley Conference football standings
	Conf.					Overall
Team	W		L		T	W		L		T
Drake +	3	–	0	–	0	5	–	4	–	0
Oklahoma A&M +	2	–	0	–	0	7	–	2	–	1
Washington University	2	–	2	–	0	4	–	2	–	2
Grinnell	1	–	2	–	0	5	–	4	–	0
Creighton	0	–	4	–	0	1	–	7	–	0
+ – Conference co-champions

1930 Nebraska College Athletic Conference football standings
	Conf.					Overall
Team	W		L		T	W		L		T
Cotner $	5	–	1	–	0	6	–	1	–	1
Nebraska Wesleyan	4	–	1	–	0	6	–	3	–	0
Doane	3	–	2	–	0	4	–	3	–	0
Hastings	3	–	2	–	0	3	–	4	–	1
York (NE)	1	–	2	–	1	3	–	3	–	2
Midland	2	–	4	–	0	2	–	5	–	1
Grand Island	1	–	3	–	1	1	–	4	–	2
Nebraska Central	0	–	4	–	0	0	–	6	–	0
$ – Conference champion

1930 Nebraska Intercollegiate Athletic Association football standings
	Conf.					Overall
Team	W		L		T	W		L		T
Kearney State $	3	–	0	–	0	7	–	0	–	1
Peru State	2	–	0	–	1	4	–	2	–	1
Chadron State	1	–	2	–	0	5	–	2	–	0
Wayne State	1	–	2	–	1	5	–	3	–	1
Omaha	0	–	3	–	0	3	–	4	–	2
$ – Conference champion

1930 New England Conference football standings
	Conf.					Overall
Team	W		L		T	W		L		T
New Hampshire $	2	–	0	–	0	5	–	2	–	1
Maine	2	–	1	–	0	3	–	4	–	0
Rhode Island State	0	–	1	–	1	5	–	2	–	1
Connecticut	0	–	2	–	1	1	–	5	–	1
$ – Conference champion; Dubious – Discuss

1930 North Central Conference football standings
	Conf.					Overall
Team	W		L		T	W		L		T
North Dakota $	4	–	0	–	0	9	–	1	–	0
North Dakota Agricultural	3	–	1	–	0	7	–	2	–	0
Morningside	2	–	2	–	0	7	–	2	–	0
South Dakota State	1	–	3	–	0	2	–	6	–	1
South Dakota	0	–	4	–	0	1	–	5	–	2
$ – Conference champion

1930 North State Conference football standings
	Conf.					Overall
Team	W		L		T	W		L		T
Catawba $	5	–	0	–	0	8	–	0	–	1
Elon	4	–	1	–	0	6	–	3	–	0
Guilford	2	–	2	–	0	4	–	5	–	1
High Point	1	–	2	–	1	2	–	6	–	2
Lenoir–Rhyne	1	–	3	–	1	3	–	6	–	1
Atlantic Christian	0	–	5	–	0	1	–	7	–	0
$ – Conference champion

1930 Northwest Conference football standings
	Conf.					Overall
Team	W		L		T	W		L		T
Whitman $	3	–	0	–	1	4	–	2	–	1
Willamette	4	–	1	–	0	5	–	3	–	0
Pacific (OR)	2	–	1	–	1	5	–	4	–	1
College of Idaho	2	–	2	–	0	3	–	4	–	1
Puget Sound	1	–	4	–	0	1	–	6	–	1
Linfield	0	–	4	–	0	1	–	7	–	0
$ – Conference champion

1930 Northwest Ohio League football standings
	Conf.					Overall
Team	W		L		T	W		L		T
Findlay $	3	–	0	–	1	4	–	2	–	1
Bowling Green	2	–	0	–	2	6	–	0	–	2
Defiance	2	–	2	–	0	3	–	4	–	0
Toledo	1	–	2	–	1	2	–	5	–	1
Bluffton	0	–	4	–	0	0	–	7	–	0
$ – Conference champion

1930 Ohio Athletic Conference football standings
	Conf.					Overall
Team	W		L		T	W		L		T
Muskingum $	3	–	0	–	1	6	–	1	–	1
Akron	5	–	1	–	0	7	–	1	–	0
Wooster	4	–	1	–	1	5	–	3	–	1
Xavier	2	–	1	–	0	6	–	4	–	0
Otterbein	3	–	2	–	0	4	–	3	–	1
Case	3	–	3	–	0	5	–	4	–	0
Mount Union	3	–	3	–	0	4	–	5	–	1
Marietta	2	–	2	–	0	3	–	5	–	0
Oberlin	2	–	4	–	0	2	–	6	–	0
Western Reserve	1	–	3	–	0	1	–	7	–	0
Ohio Northern	1	–	4	–	0	3	–	5	–	0
Baldwin–Wallace	1	–	5	–	0	1	–	6	–	0
Kenyon	0	–	4	–	1	1	–	6	–	1
Hiram	0	–	5	–	0	0	–	8	–	0
Heidelberg *	2	–	0	–	0	8	–	0	–	0
Dayton *	2	–	0	–	0	4	–	3	–	2
Capital *	4	–	0	–	1	5	–	1	–	1
$ – Conference champion; * – did not compete for championship

1930 Oklahoma Collegiate Conference football standings
	Conf.					Overall
Team	W		L		T	W		L		T
East Central $	4	–	0	–	0	8	–	1	–	0
Central State Teachers	4	–	1	–	0	6	–	3	–	0
SE Oklahoma State	3	–	1	–	0	6	–	2	–	1
NW Oklahoma State	1	–	3	–	1	5	–	3	–	1
Northeastern State	1	–	4	–	0	4	–	5	–	0
SW Oklahoma State	0	–	4	–	1	2	–	5	–	1
$ – Conference champion

1930 Smoky Mountain Conference football standings
	Conf.					Overall
Team	W		L		T	W		L		T
Maryville (TN) $	2	–	0	–	0	5	–	4	–	0
Lincoln Memorial	2	–	0	–	0	4	–	6	–	0
King	3	–	1	–	0	6	–	2	–	1
Carson–Newman	3	–	2	–	0	5	–	4	–	0
Milligan	1	–	2	–	1	4	–	4	–	1
Tusculum	1	–	3	–	1	2	–	5	–	1
East Tennessee State Teachers	0	–	4	–	0	0	–	7	–	0
$ – Conference champion

1930 South Dakota Intercollegiate Conference football standings
	Conf.					Overall
Team	W		L		T	W		L		T
Yankton $	4	–	0	–	1	6	–	0	–	2
Northern Normal	4	–	1	–	0	5	–	1	–	1
Southern Normal	4	–	1	–	1	?	–	?	–	?
Dakota Wesleyan	3	–	1	–	0	6	–	3	–	0
Spearfish	3	–	2	–	0	5	–	3	–	0
Eastern Normal	2	–	2	–	1	2	–	2	–	2
Augustana (SD)	2	–	3	–	0	2	–	7	–	0
South Dakota Mines	2	–	4	–	0	3	–	5	–	0
Huron	1	–	6	–	0	1	–	7	–	0
Sioux Falls	0	–	5	–	1	0	–	6	–	1
$ – Conference champion; Sioux Falls and Spearfish played twice. The second game was not counted in the conference standings.

1930 Southern California Conference football standings
	Conf.					Overall
Team	W		L		T	W		L		T
Caltech $	4	–	0	–	0	5	–	3	–	1
Whittier	4	–	1	–	0	5	–	3	–	1
San Diego State	3	–	3	–	0	5	–	4	–	0
Occidental	2	–	3	–	0	4	–	4	–	0
Redlands	2	–	3	–	0	3	–	5	–	0
Pomona	2	–	3	–	0	2	–	5	–	0
La Verne	0	–	4	–	0	0	–	6	–	1
$ – Conference champion

1930 Southern Intercollegiate Athletic Association football standings
	Conf.					Overall
Team	W		L		T	W		L		T
Presbyterian $	6	–	0	–	0	9	–	1	–	0
Centre	5	–	0	–	0	7	–	3	–	0
Spring Hill	4	–	0	–	0	6	–	2	–	0
Loyola (LA)	2	–	0	–	0	9	–	1	–	0
Centenary	2	–	0	–	0	8	–	1	–	1
Western Kentucky State Teachers	6	–	1	–	0	8	–	1	–	1
Louisiana Normal	4	–	1	–	0	7	–	2	–	0
Mississippi College	4	–	1	–	0	7	–	2	–	0
The Citadel	3	–	1	–	1	4	–	5	–	2
Kentucky Wesleyan	2	–	1	–	1	2	–	4	–	3
Chattanooga	3	–	2	–	1	5	–	3	–	2
Mercer	3	–	2	–	0	4	–	5	–	0
Millsaps	3	–	3	–	0	6	–	3	–	0
Louisville	2	–	2	–	0	5	–	3	–	0
Birmingham–Southern	3	–	3	–	0	5	–	4	–	0
Stetson	3	–	3	–	0	5	–	3	–	0
Howard (AL)	2	–	3	–	0	5	–	5	–	0
Miami (FL)	2	–	3	–	1	3	–	4	–	1
Southwestern (TN)	1	–	2	–	0	6	–	3	–	0
Erskine	1	–	2	–	1	2	–	5	–	1
Louisiana Tech	2	–	5	–	0	3	–	6	–	0
Georgetown (KY)	1	–	3	–	0	2	–	7	–	0
Wofford	1	–	3	–	0	2	–	9	–	0
Union (TN)	1	–	4	–	0	1	–	5	–	2
Transylvania	1	–	4	–	1	1	–	5	–	2
Louisiana College	1	–	5	–	0	2	–	6	–	0
SW Louisiana	1	–	5	–	0	2	–	8	–	0
Rollins	0	–	0	–	2	2	–	1	–	3
Newberry	0	–	2	–	1	0	–	5	–	3
Southern College	0	–	4	–	1	0	–	6	–	1
Eastern Kentucky	0	–	4	–	0	1	–	7	–	0
$ – Conference champion

1930 Southern Intercollegiate Athletic Conference football standings
	Conf.					Overall
Team	W		L		T	W		L		T
Tuskegee $	7	–	0	–	0	10	–	0	–	1
Fisk	2	–	0	–	0	10	–	1	–	0
Morehouse	6	–	1	–	0	9	–	2	–	0
Morris Brown	4	–	2	–	1	6	–	3	–	1
Edward Waters	2	–	1	–	0	7	–	1	–	1
Alabama State	3	–	3	–	0	6	–	5	–	0
Knoxville	1	–	2	–	0	?	–	?	–	?
Talladega	1	–	4	–	0	?	–	?	–	?
Clark (GA)	0	–	3	–	1	?	–	?	–	?
Florida A&M	0	–	3	–	0	2	–	4	–	0
Lane	0	–	3	–	0	?	–	?	–	?
Miles	0	–	4	–	0	2	–	5	–	0
$ – Conference champion

1930 Southwestern Athletic Conference football standings
	Conf.					Overall
Team	W		L		T	W		L		T
Wiley $	4	–	0	–	0	8	–	1	–	1
Prairie View	3	–	1	–	0	8	–	3	–	0
Bishop	2	–	2	–	0	2	–	5	–	0
Samuel Huston	1	–	3	–	0	1	–	5	–	0
Texas College	0	–	4	–	0	?	–	?	–	?
$ – Conference champion

1930 Texas Conference football standings
	Conf.					Overall
Team	W		L		T	W		L		T
Howard Payne $	4	–	0	–	1	7	–	2	–	2
Southwestern (TX)	3	–	1	–	1	3	–	4	–	4
Simmons (TX)	1	–	1	–	3	5	–	1	–	4
Austin	2	–	2	–	1	3	–	5	–	1
St. Edward's	0	–	3	–	2	1	–	4	–	2
Trinity (TX)	1	–	4	–	0	2	–	6	–	0
$ – Conference champion

1930 Texas Intercollegiate Athletic Association football standings
	Conf.					Overall
Team	W		L		T	W		L		T
Sam Houston State $	5	–	0	–	0	9	–	1	–	0
West Texas State	4	–	0	–	1	6	–	3	–	1
North Texas State Teachers	4	–	1	–	0	5	–	4	–	1
Southwest Texas State	3	–	1	–	2	5	–	2	–	3
McMurry	3	–	2	–	1	3	–	4	–	2
Daniel Baker	2	–	2	–	2	2	–	7	–	2
Texas A&I	1	–	2	–	1	3	–	3	–	3
Abilene Christian	1	–	3	–	1	2	–	7	–	1
East Texas State	1	–	4	–	0	2	–	7	–	0
Sul Ross	0	–	3	–	0	1	–	7	–	0
Stephen F. Austin	0	–	6	–	0	1	–	7	–	1
$ – Conference champion

1930 Tri-State Conference football standings
	Conf.					Overall
Team	W		L		T	W		L		T
Geneva $	3	–	0	–	0	9	–	1	–	0
Thiel	2	–	1	–	0	3	–	6	–	0
Waynesburg	1	–	1	–	0	2	–	7	–	0
Westminster (PA)	1	–	2	–	0	4	–	5	–	0
Bethany (WV)	0	–	3	–	0	0	–	8	–	0
$ – Conference champion

1930 Virginia Conference football standings
	Conf.					Overall
Team	W		L		T	W		L		T
William & Mary $	5	–	0	–	0	7	–	2	–	1
Emory and Henry	3	–	1	–	0	8	–	1	–	1
Randolph–Macon	3	–	2	–	1	3	–	5	–	2
Roanoke	3	–	2	–	2	3	–	4	–	2
Richmond	2	–	2	–	2	2	–	4	–	2
Hampden–Sydney	2	–	3	–	1	2	–	6	–	1
Lynchburg	1	–	4	–	0	1	–	7	–	0
Bridgewater	0	–	5	–	0	0	–	7	–	0
$ – Conference champion

1930 West Virginia Athletic Conference football standings
	Conf.					Overall
Team	W		L		T	W		L		T
West Liberty State $	4	–	0	–	0	5	–	3	–	1
West Virginia Wesleyan	3	–	0	–	2	4	–	5	–	2
Marshall	3	–	0	–	1	3	–	5	–	1
Glenville State	5	–	1	–	1	5	–	1	–	2
New River State	3	–	1	–	1	5	–	2	–	1
Potomac State	2	–	1	–	1	4	–	3	–	1
Broaddus	2	–	2	–	3	2	–	4	–	3
Morris Harvey	1	–	3	–	2	2	–	5	–	2
Salem	1	–	5	–	1	2	–	6	–	1
Concord	0	–	3	–	1	1	–	5	–	2
Fairmont State	0	–	4	–	1	0	–	5	–	2
Davis & Elkins *	1	–	0	–	0	6	–	4	–	1
Shepherd *	1	–	1	–	0	2	–	3	–	1
Bethany (WV) *	0	–	2	–	0	0	–	8	–	0
Morehead State *	0	–	3	–	0	2	–	6	–	0
$ – Conference champion; * – Did not qualify for conference standings Ties did not count in conference standings.

1930 Wisconsin State Teachers College Conference football standings
	Conf.					Overall
Team	W		L		T	W		L		T
Milwaukee State $	4	–	0	–	0	7	–	1	–	0
River Falls State	3	–	1	–	0	5	–	1	–	0
Whitewater State	3	–	1	–	0	4	–	2	–	0
La Crosse State	3	–	1	–	1	5	–	2	–	2
Oshkosh State	2	–	2	–	1	2	–	4	–	2
Eau Claire State	1	–	2	–	1	3	–	3	–	1
Platteville State	1	–	3	–	0	2	–	3	–	0
Stevens Point State	1	–	4	–	1	1	–	6	–	1
Stout Institute	0	–	4	–	0	1	–	6	–	0
Superior State	0	–	0	–	0	3	–	2	–	2
$ – Conference champion

== Champions (by method) ==
Various different rankings (using differing methods) have identified Alabama or Notre Dame as champion, both at the time and in the decades since.

- Berryman QPRS (math system): Alabama
- Billingsley Report (math system): Notre Dame
- Bonniwell Trophy vote: (Note: awarded upon unanimous consensus of the board of the Veteran Athletes of Philadelphia) Notre Dame
- Boand System (math system): Notre Dame
- College Football Researchers Association vote: Alabama
- Parke H. Davis (Note: for Spalding's Official Foot Ball Guide) (research): Alabama
- Dickinson System (math system): Notre Dame
- Dunkel System (math system): Notre Dame
- Erskine Trophy poll: Notre Dame
- Helms Athletic Foundation: Notre Dame
- Houlgate System (math system): Notre Dame
- National Championship Foundation vote: Notre Dame
- Poling System (math system): Notre Dame
- Sagarin Ratings Elo chess method (math system): Alabama
- Sagarin Ratings Predictor method (math system): Alabama

Note: Boand System, Dickinson System, Dunkel System, Houlgate System, Erskine Trophy poll, and Bonniwell Trophy vote were given contemporarily. All other rankings were given retroactively

== See also ==
- 1930 College Football All-America Team
