= 1930 Vermont Catamounts football team =

American college football season

1930 Vermont Catamounts football
- Conference: Independent
- Record: 1–7–1
- Head coach: David L. Dunn (1st season)
- Home stadium: Centennial Field

1930 Eastern college football independents records
	Conf.			Overall
Team	W	L	T	W		L		T
Colgate		–		9	–	1	–	0
Fordham		–		8	–	1	–	0
No. 9 Army		–		9	–	1	–	1
No. 8 Dartmouth		–		7	–	1	–	1
St. John's		–		7	–	1	–	0
NYU		–		7	–	3	–	0
Cornell		–		6	–	2	–	0
Pittsburgh		–		6	–	2	–	1
Washington & Jefferson		–		6	–	2	–	1
Tufts		–		5	–	2	–	0
Temple		–		7	–	3	–	0
Bucknell		–		6	–	3	–	0
Carnegie Tech		–		6	–	3	–	0
Duquesne		–		6	–	3	–	0
Syracuse		–		5	–	2	–	2
Yale		–		5	–	2	–	2
CCNY		–		5	–	2	–	1
Brown		–		6	–	3	–	1
Drexel		–		6	–	3	–	1
Franklin & Marshall		–		5	–	3	–	1
Manhattan		–		4	–	3	–	1
Columbia		–		5	–	4	–	0
Penn		–		5	–	4	–	0
Boston College		–		5	–	5	–	0
Villanova		–		5	–	5	–	0
Penn State		–		3	–	4	–	2
Harvard		–		3	–	4	–	1
Providence		–		3	–	4	–	1
Princeton		–		1	–	5	–	1
Boston University		–		1	–	7	–	1
Vermont		–		1	–	7	–	1
Massachusetts		–		1	–	8	–	0
Rankings from Dickinson System

The 1930 Vermont Catamounts football team was an American football team that represented the University of Vermont as an independent during the 1930 college football season. In their first year under head coach David L. Dunn, the team compiled a 1–7–1 record.

== Schedule ==
Date	Opponent	Site	Result	Source
September 27	at Amherst	Pratt Field; Amherst, MA	L 0–41	
October 4	at Harvard	Harvard Stadium; Boston, MA	L 0–35	
October 11	Coast Guard	Centennial Field; Burlington, VT	W 13–0	
October 18	at Union (NY)	Alexander Field; Schenectady, NY	L 7–19	
October 25	at New Hampshire	Lewis Field; Durham, NH	L 0–59	
November 1	RPI	Centennial Field; Burlington, VT	L 0–7	
November 8	Norwich	Centennial Field; Burlington, VT	T 0–0	
November 15	at Middlebury	Porter Field; Middlebury, VT	L 7–22	
November 27	at Springfield (MA)	Pratt Field; Springfield, MA	L 0–82	
