= 1930 Yale Bulldogs football team =

American college football season

1930 Yale Bulldogs football
- Conference: Independent
- Record: 5–2–2
- Head coach: Mal Stevens (3rd season)
- Offensive scheme: Single-wing
- Captain: Francis T. Vincent
- Home stadium: Yale Bowl

1930 Eastern college football independents records
	Conf.			Overall
Team	W	L	T	W		L		T
Colgate		–		9	–	1	–	0
Fordham		–		8	–	1	–	0
No. 9 Army		–		9	–	1	–	1
No. 8 Dartmouth		–		7	–	1	–	1
St. John's		–		7	–	1	–	0
NYU		–		7	–	3	–	0
Cornell		–		6	–	2	–	0
Pittsburgh		–		6	–	2	–	1
Washington & Jefferson		–		6	–	2	–	1
Tufts		–		5	–	2	–	0
Temple		–		7	–	3	–	0
Bucknell		–		6	–	3	–	0
Carnegie Tech		–		6	–	3	–	0
Duquesne		–		6	–	3	–	0
Syracuse		–		5	–	2	–	2
Yale		–		5	–	2	–	2
CCNY		–		5	–	2	–	1
Brown		–		6	–	3	–	1
Drexel		–		6	–	3	–	1
Franklin & Marshall		–		5	–	3	–	1
Manhattan		–		4	–	3	–	1
Columbia		–		5	–	4	–	0
Penn		–		5	–	4	–	0
Boston College		–		5	–	5	–	0
Villanova		–		5	–	5	–	0
Penn State		–		3	–	4	–	2
Harvard		–		3	–	4	–	1
Providence		–		3	–	4	–	1
Princeton		–		1	–	5	–	1
Boston University		–		1	–	7	–	1
Vermont		–		1	–	7	–	1
Massachusetts		–		1	–	8	–	0
Rankings from Dickinson System

The 1930 Yale Bulldogs football team represented Yale University in the 1930 college football season. In their third year under head coach Mal Stevens, the Bulldogs compiled a 5–2–2 record.

== Schedule ==
Date	Opponent	Site	Result	Attendance	Source
September 27	Maine	Yale Bowl; New Haven, CT	W 38–0	21,000	
October 4	Maryland	Yale Bowl; New Haven, CT	W 40–13	50,000	
October 11	Georgia	Yale Bowl; New Haven, CT	L 14–18	45,000	
October 18	Brown	Yale Bowl; New Haven, CT	W 21–0	40,000	
October 25	Army	Yale Bowl; New Haven, CT	T 7–7	77,000	
November 1	Dartmouth	Yale Bowl; New Haven, CT	T 0–0	51,000	
November 8	Alfred	Yale Bowl; New Haven, CT	W 66–0		
November 15	at Princeton	Palmer Stadium; Princeton, NJ (rivalry)	W 10–7	60,000	
November 22	Harvard	Yale Bowl; New Haven, CT (rivalry)	L 0–13	78,000	
