= 1930 Dartmouth Indians football team =

American college football season

1930 Dartmouth Indians football
- Conference: Independent
- Record: 7–1–1
- Head coach: Jackson Cannell (4th season)
- Captain: Harold Andres
- Home stadium: Memorial Field

1930 Eastern college football independents records
	Conf.			Overall
Team	W	L	T	W		L		T
Colgate		–		9	–	1	–	0
Fordham		–		8	–	1	–	0
No. 9 Army		–		9	–	1	–	1
No. 8 Dartmouth		–		7	–	1	–	1
St. John's		–		7	–	1	–	0
NYU		–		7	–	3	–	0
Cornell		–		6	–	2	–	0
Pittsburgh		–		6	–	2	–	1
Washington & Jefferson		–		6	–	2	–	1
Tufts		–		5	–	2	–	0
Temple		–		7	–	3	–	0
Bucknell		–		6	–	3	–	0
Carnegie Tech		–		6	–	3	–	0
Duquesne		–		6	–	3	–	0
Syracuse		–		5	–	2	–	2
Yale		–		5	–	2	–	2
CCNY		–		5	–	2	–	1
Brown		–		6	–	3	–	1
Drexel		–		6	–	3	–	1
Franklin & Marshall		–		5	–	3	–	1
Manhattan		–		4	–	3	–	1
Columbia		–		5	–	4	–	0
Penn		–		5	–	4	–	0
Boston College		–		5	–	5	–	0
Villanova		–		5	–	5	–	0
Penn State		–		3	–	4	–	2
Harvard		–		3	–	4	–	1
Providence		–		3	–	4	–	1
Princeton		–		1	–	5	–	1
Boston University		–		1	–	7	–	1
Vermont		–		1	–	7	–	1
Massachusetts		–		1	–	8	–	0
Rankings from Dickinson System

The 1930 Dartmouth Indians football team was an American football team that represented Dartmouth College as an independent during the 1930 college football season. In their fourth season under head coach Jackson Cannell, the Indians compiled a 7–1–1 record, shut out five of nine opponents, and outscored opponents by a total of 301 to 43.

Harold Andres was the team captain. Willard C. Wolff was the team's leading scorer with 43 points scored on six touchdowns and seven extra points. Bill Morton added 42 points on seven touchdowns.

== Schedule ==
Date	Opponent	Site	Result	Attendance	Source
September 27	Norwich	Memorial Field; Hanover, NH	W 79–0		
October 4	Bates	Memorial Field; Hanover, NH	W 20–0		
October 11	Boston University	Memorial Field; Hanover, NH	W 74–0		
October 18	Columbia	Memorial Field; Hanover, NH	W 52–0		
October 25	at Harvard	Harvard Stadium; Boston, MA (rivalry)	W 7–2	40,000	
November 1	at Yale	Yale Bowl; New Haven, CT	T 0–0	51,000	
November 8	Allegheny	Memorial Field; Hanover, NH	W 43–14		
November 15	at Cornell	Schoellkopf Field; Ithaca, NY (rivalry)	W 19–13	25,000	
November 29	at Stanford	Stanford Stadium; Stanford, CA	L 7–14	40,000	
