= 1930 Temple Owls football team =

American college football season

1930 Temple Owls football
- Conference: Independent
- Record: 7–3
- Head coach: Heinie Miller (6th season)
- Captain: John Bonner
- Home stadium: Temple Stadium

1930 Eastern college football independents records
	Conf.			Overall
Team	W	L	T	W		L		T
Colgate		–		9	–	1	–	0
Fordham		–		8	–	1	–	0
No. 9 Army		–		9	–	1	–	1
No. 8 Dartmouth		–		7	–	1	–	1
St. John's		–		7	–	1	–	0
NYU		–		7	–	3	–	0
Cornell		–		6	–	2	–	0
Pittsburgh		–		6	–	2	–	1
Washington & Jefferson		–		6	–	2	–	1
Tufts		–		5	–	2	–	0
Temple		–		7	–	3	–	0
Bucknell		–		6	–	3	–	0
Carnegie Tech		–		6	–	3	–	0
Duquesne		–		6	–	3	–	0
Syracuse		–		5	–	2	–	2
Yale		–		5	–	2	–	2
CCNY		–		5	–	2	–	1
Brown		–		6	–	3	–	1
Drexel		–		6	–	3	–	1
Franklin & Marshall		–		5	–	3	–	1
Manhattan		–		4	–	3	–	1
Columbia		–		5	–	4	–	0
Penn		–		5	–	4	–	0
Boston College		–		5	–	5	–	0
Villanova		–		5	–	5	–	0
Penn State		–		3	–	4	–	2
Harvard		–		3	–	4	–	1
Providence		–		3	–	4	–	1
Princeton		–		1	–	5	–	1
Boston University		–		1	–	7	–	1
Vermont		–		1	–	7	–	1
Massachusetts		–		1	–	8	–	0
Rankings from Dickinson System

The 1930 Temple Owls football team was an American football team that represented Temple University as an independent during the 1930 college football season. In its sixth season under head coach Heinie Miller, the team compiled a 7–3 record.

== Schedule ==
Date	Time	Opponent	Site	Result	Attendance	Source
September 26		Thiel	Temple Stadium; Philadelphia, PA	W 13–6		
October 3		St. Thomas (PA)	Temple Stadium; Philadelphia, PA	W 28–2	18,000	
October 10	8:30 p.m.	Bucknell	Temple Stadium; Philadelphia, PA	W 7–6	35,000	
October 18	2:30 p.m.	Washington & Jefferson	Temple Stadium; Philadelphia, PA	W 20–7	15,000	
October 25		at Villanova	Philadelphia Municipal Stadium; Philadelphia, PA	L 7–8	25,000	
October 31		Wake Forest	Temple Stadium; Philadelphia, PA	W 36–0	9,000	
November 8		vs. Miami (FL)	Atlantic City Convention Hall; Atlantic City, NJ	W 34–0	16,000	
November 15		Lafayette	Temple Stadium; Philadelphia, PA	W 46–0	10,000	
November 22		Carnegie Tech	Franklin Field; Philadelphia, PA	L 13–22		
November 29		Drake	Temple Stadium; Philadelphia, PA	L 20–49		
All times are in Eastern time
