= 1930 CCNY Lavender football team =

American college football season

1930 CCNY Lavender football
- Conference: Independent
- Record: 5–2–1
- Head coach: Harold J. Parker (7th season)
- Home stadium: Lewisohn Stadium

1930 Eastern college football independents records
| | Conf. | | | Overall |
| Team | W | L | T | W | | L | | T |
|---|---|---|---|---|---|---|---|---|
| Colgate | | – | | 9 | – | 1 | – | 0 |
| Fordham | | – | | 8 | – | 1 | – | 0 |
| No. 9 Army | | – | | 9 | – | 1 | – | 1 |
| No. 8 Dartmouth | | – | | 7 | – | 1 | – | 1 |
| St. John's | | – | | 7 | – | 1 | – | 0 |
| NYU | | – | | 7 | – | 3 | – | 0 |
| Cornell | | – | | 6 | – | 2 | – | 0 |
| Pittsburgh | | – | | 6 | – | 2 | – | 1 |
| Washington & Jefferson | | – | | 6 | – | 2 | – | 1 |
| Tufts | | – | | 5 | – | 2 | – | 0 |
| Temple | | – | | 7 | – | 3 | – | 0 |
| Bucknell | | – | | 6 | – | 3 | – | 0 |
| Carnegie Tech | | – | | 6 | – | 3 | – | 0 |
| Duquesne | | – | | 6 | – | 3 | – | 0 |
| Syracuse | | – | | 5 | – | 2 | – | 2 |
| Yale | | – | | 5 | – | 2 | – | 2 |
| CCNY | | – | | 5 | – | 2 | – | 1 |
| Brown | | – | | 6 | – | 3 | – | 1 |
| Drexel | | – | | 6 | – | 3 | – | 1 |
| Franklin & Marshall | | – | | 5 | – | 3 | – | 1 |
| Manhattan | | – | | 4 | – | 3 | – | 1 |
| Columbia | | – | | 5 | – | 4 | – | 0 |
| Penn | | – | | 5 | – | 4 | – | 0 |
| Boston College | | – | | 5 | – | 5 | – | 0 |
| Villanova | | – | | 5 | – | 5 | – | 0 |
| Penn State | | – | | 3 | – | 4 | – | 2 |
| Harvard | | – | | 3 | – | 4 | – | 1 |
| Providence | | – | | 3 | – | 4 | – | 1 |
| Princeton | | – | | 1 | – | 5 | – | 1 |
| Boston University | | – | | 1 | – | 7 | – | 1 |
| Vermont | | – | | 1 | – | 7 | – | 1 |
| Massachusetts | | – | | 1 | – | 8 | – | 0 |
Rankings from Dickinson System

The 1930 CCNY Lavender football team was an American football team that represented the City College of New York (CCNY) as an independent during the 1930 college football season. In their seventh season under Harold J. Parker, the Lavender team compiled a 5–2–1 record.

== Schedule ==
| Date | Opponent | Site | Result | Source |
|---|---|---|---|---|
| September 27 | LIU | Lewisohn Stadium; New York, NY | W 44–0 | |
| October 4 | at Lowell Textile | Lowell, MA | L 6–12 | |
| October 11 | Seton Hall | Lewisohn Stadium; New York, NY | W 44–12 | |
| October 18 | Massachusetts | Lewisohn Stadium; New York, NY | W 31–7 | |
| October 25 | Drexel | Lewisohn Stadium; New York, NY | W 18–6 | |
| November 1 | Manhattan | Lewisohn Stadium; New York, NY | T 6–6 | |
| November 8 | St. John's (NY) | Lewisohn Stadium; New York, NY | L 0–12 | |
| November 15 | at Haverford | Haverford, PA | W 40–7 | |
