= 1930 Cornell Big Red football team =

American college football season

1930 Cornell Big Red football
- Conference: Independent
- Record: 6–2
- Head coach: Gil Dobie (11th season)
- Offensive scheme: Single-wing
- Base defense: 6–3–2
- Captain: Paul Hunt
- Home stadium: Schoellkopf Field

1930 Eastern college football independents records
	Conf.			Overall
Team	W	L	T	W		L		T
Colgate		–		9	–	1	–	0
Fordham		–		8	–	1	–	0
No. 9 Army		–		9	–	1	–	1
No. 8 Dartmouth		–		7	–	1	–	1
St. John's		–		7	–	1	–	0
NYU		–		7	–	3	–	0
Cornell		–		6	–	2	–	0
Pittsburgh		–		6	–	2	–	1
Washington & Jefferson		–		6	–	2	–	1
Tufts		–		5	–	2	–	0
Temple		–		7	–	3	–	0
Bucknell		–		6	–	3	–	0
Carnegie Tech		–		6	–	3	–	0
Duquesne		–		6	–	3	–	0
Syracuse		–		5	–	2	–	2
Yale		–		5	–	2	–	2
CCNY		–		5	–	2	–	1
Brown		–		6	–	3	–	1
Drexel		–		6	–	3	–	1
Franklin & Marshall		–		5	–	3	–	1
Manhattan		–		4	–	3	–	1
Columbia		–		5	–	4	–	0
Penn		–		5	–	4	–	0
Boston College		–		5	–	5	–	0
Villanova		–		5	–	5	–	0
Penn State		–		3	–	4	–	2
Harvard		–		3	–	4	–	1
Providence		–		3	–	4	–	1
Princeton		–		1	–	5	–	1
Boston University		–		1	–	7	–	1
Vermont		–		1	–	7	–	1
Massachusetts		–		1	–	8	–	0
Rankings from Dickinson System

The 1930 Cornell Big Red football team was an American football team that represented Cornell University during the 1930 college football season. In their 11th season under head coach Gil Dobie, the Big Red compiled a 6–2 record and outscored their opponents by a combined total of 273 to 63.

== Schedule ==
Date	Opponent	Site	Result	Attendance	Source
September 27	Clarkson	Schoellkopf Field; Ithaca, NY	W 66–0		
October 4	Niagara	Schoellkopf Field; Ithaca, NY	W 61–14		
October 11	Hampden–Sydney	Schoellkopf Field; Ithaca, NY	W 47–6		
October 18	at Princeton	Palmer Stadium; Princeton, NJ	W 12–7	40,000	
November 1	at Columbia	Baker Field; New York, NY (rivalry)	L 7–10	25,000	
November 8	Hobart	Schoellkopf Field; Ithaca, NY	W 54–0		
November 15	Dartmouth	Schoellkopf Field; Ithaca, NY (rivalry)	L 13–19	25,000	
November 27	at Penn	Franklin Field; Philadelphia, PA (rivalry)	W 13–7	65,000	
