= 1930 Columbia Lions football team =

American college football season

1930 Columbia Lions football
- Conference: Independent
- Record: 5–4
- Head coach: Lou Little (1st season)
- Home stadium: Baker Field

1930 Eastern college football independents records
	Conf.			Overall
Team	W	L	T	W		L		T
Colgate		–		9	–	1	–	0
Fordham		–		8	–	1	–	0
No. 9 Army		–		9	–	1	–	1
No. 8 Dartmouth		–		7	–	1	–	1
St. John's		–		7	–	1	–	0
NYU		–		7	–	3	–	0
Cornell		–		6	–	2	–	0
Pittsburgh		–		6	–	2	–	1
Washington & Jefferson		–		6	–	2	–	1
Tufts		–		5	–	2	–	0
Temple		–		7	–	3	–	0
Bucknell		–		6	–	3	–	0
Carnegie Tech		–		6	–	3	–	0
Duquesne		–		6	–	3	–	0
Syracuse		–		5	–	2	–	2
Yale		–		5	–	2	–	2
CCNY		–		5	–	2	–	1
Brown		–		6	–	3	–	1
Drexel		–		6	–	3	–	1
Franklin & Marshall		–		5	–	3	–	1
Manhattan		–		4	–	3	–	1
Columbia		–		5	–	4	–	0
Penn		–		5	–	4	–	0
Boston College		–		5	–	5	–	0
Villanova		–		5	–	5	–	0
Penn State		–		3	–	4	–	2
Harvard		–		3	–	4	–	1
Providence		–		3	–	4	–	1
Princeton		–		1	–	5	–	1
Boston University		–		1	–	7	–	1
Vermont		–		1	–	7	–	1
Massachusetts		–		1	–	8	–	0
Rankings from Dickinson System

The 1930 Columbia Lions football team was an American football team that represented Columbia University as an independent during the 1930 college football season. The team compiled a 5–4 record and outscored opponents 141 to 138, with four shutouts. The team played its home games at Baker Field in Upper Manhattan.

In December 1929, Lou Little was hired as Columbia's head football coach, effective in the fall of 1930. He had been the football coach at Georgetown for five years.

== Schedule ==
Date	Opponent	Site	Result	Attendance	Source
September 27	Middlebury	Baker Field; New York, NY	W 48–0		
October 4	Union (NY)	Baker Field; New York, NY	W 25–0	17,000	
October 11	Wesleyan	Baker Field; New York, NY	W 48–0		
October 18	at Dartmouth	Memorial Field; Hanover, NH	L 0–52		
October 25	Williams	Baker Field; New York, NY	W 3–0	15,000	
November 1	Cornell	Baker Field; New York, NY (rivalry)	W 10–7	25,000	
November 8	Colgate	Baker Field; New York, NY	L 0–54	10,000	
November 15	at Brown	Brown Stadium; Providence, RI	L 0–7		
November 27	Syracuse	Baker Field; New York, NY	L 7–19	25,000	
