= 1930 Washington & Jefferson Presidents football team =

American college football season

1930 Washington & Jefferson Presidents football
- Conference: Independent
- Record: 6–2–1
- Head coach: Bill Amos (2nd season)
- Home stadium: College Park

1930 Eastern college football independents records
| | Conf. | | | Overall |
| Team | W | L | T | W | | L | | T |
|---|---|---|---|---|---|---|---|---|
| Colgate | | – | | 9 | – | 1 | – | 0 |
| Fordham | | – | | 8 | – | 1 | – | 0 |
| No. 9 Army | | – | | 9 | – | 1 | – | 1 |
| No. 8 Dartmouth | | – | | 7 | – | 1 | – | 1 |
| St. John's | | – | | 7 | – | 1 | – | 0 |
| NYU | | – | | 7 | – | 3 | – | 0 |
| Cornell | | – | | 6 | – | 2 | – | 0 |
| Pittsburgh | | – | | 6 | – | 2 | – | 1 |
| Washington & Jefferson | | – | | 6 | – | 2 | – | 1 |
| Tufts | | – | | 5 | – | 2 | – | 0 |
| Temple | | – | | 7 | – | 3 | – | 0 |
| Bucknell | | – | | 6 | – | 3 | – | 0 |
| Carnegie Tech | | – | | 6 | – | 3 | – | 0 |
| Duquesne | | – | | 6 | – | 3 | – | 0 |
| Syracuse | | – | | 5 | – | 2 | – | 2 |
| Yale | | – | | 5 | – | 2 | – | 2 |
| CCNY | | – | | 5 | – | 2 | – | 1 |
| Brown | | – | | 6 | – | 3 | – | 1 |
| Drexel | | – | | 6 | – | 3 | – | 1 |
| Franklin & Marshall | | – | | 5 | – | 3 | – | 1 |
| Manhattan | | – | | 4 | – | 3 | – | 1 |
| Columbia | | – | | 5 | – | 4 | – | 0 |
| Penn | | – | | 5 | – | 4 | – | 0 |
| Boston College | | – | | 5 | – | 5 | – | 0 |
| Villanova | | – | | 5 | – | 5 | – | 0 |
| Penn State | | – | | 3 | – | 4 | – | 2 |
| Harvard | | – | | 3 | – | 4 | – | 1 |
| Providence | | – | | 3 | – | 4 | – | 1 |
| Princeton | | – | | 1 | – | 5 | – | 1 |
| Boston University | | – | | 1 | – | 7 | – | 1 |
| Vermont | | – | | 1 | – | 7 | – | 1 |
| Massachusetts | | – | | 1 | – | 8 | – | 0 |
Rankings from Dickinson System

The 1930 Washington & Jefferson Presidents football team was an American football team that represented Washington & Jefferson College as an independent during the 1930 college football season. The team compiled a 6–2–1 record and outscored opponents by a total of 164 to 65. Bill Amos was the head coach.

== Schedule ==
| Date | Time | Opponent | Site | Result | Attendance | Source |
|---|---|---|---|---|---|---|
| September 27 | | Bethany (WV) | College Park; Washington, PA | W 74–0 | 7,000 | |
| October 4 | | Westminster (PA) | College Park; Washington, PA | W 35–0 | | |
| October 11 | | at Wittenberg | Wittenberg Field; Springfield, OH | T 7–7 | | |
| October 18 | 2:30 p.m. | at Temple | Temple Stadium; Philadelphia, PA | L 7–20 | 15,000 | |
| October 25 | | vs. Lafayette | Convention Hall; Atlantic City, NJ | W 7–0 | | |
| November 1 | | vs. Thiel | Taggart Field; New Castle, PA | W 20–0 | | |
| November 15 | | Bucknell | College Park; Washington, PA | W 7–6 | | |
| November 22 | | at West Virginia | Mountaineer Field; Morgantown, WV | W 7–6 | | |
| December 6 | | at Carnegie Tech | Pitt Stadium; Pittsburgh, PA | L 0–26 | 10,000 | |
All times are in Eastern time
