= 1930 Villanova Wildcats football team =

American college football season

1930 Villanova Wildcats football
- Conference: Independent
- Record: 5–5
- Head coach: Harry Stuhldreher (6th season)
- Captain: Cletus Gardner
- Home stadium: Villanova Stadium, Philadelphia Municipal Stadium

1930 Eastern college football independents records
	Conf.			Overall
Team	W	L	T	W		L		T
Colgate		–		9	–	1	–	0
Fordham		–		8	–	1	–	0
No. 9 Army		–		9	–	1	–	1
No. 8 Dartmouth		–		7	–	1	–	1
St. John's		–		7	–	1	–	0
NYU		–		7	–	3	–	0
Cornell		–		6	–	2	–	0
Pittsburgh		–		6	–	2	–	1
Washington & Jefferson		–		6	–	2	–	1
Tufts		–		5	–	2	–	0
Temple		–		7	–	3	–	0
Bucknell		–		6	–	3	–	0
Carnegie Tech		–		6	–	3	–	0
Duquesne		–		6	–	3	–	0
Syracuse		–		5	–	2	–	2
Yale		–		5	–	2	–	2
CCNY		–		5	–	2	–	1
Brown		–		6	–	3	–	1
Drexel		–		6	–	3	–	1
Franklin & Marshall		–		5	–	3	–	1
Manhattan		–		4	–	3	–	1
Columbia		–		5	–	4	–	0
Penn		–		5	–	4	–	0
Boston College		–		5	–	5	–	0
Villanova		–		5	–	5	–	0
Penn State		–		3	–	4	–	2
Harvard		–		3	–	4	–	1
Providence		–		3	–	4	–	1
Princeton		–		1	–	5	–	1
Boston University		–		1	–	7	–	1
Vermont		–		1	–	7	–	1
Massachusetts		–		1	–	8	–	0
Rankings from Dickinson System

The 1930 Villanova Wildcats football team represented the Villanova University during the 1930 college football season. The head coach was Harry Stuhldreher, coaching his sixth season with the Wildcats. The team played their home games at Villanova Stadium in Villanova, Pennsylvania.

== Schedule ==
Date	Opponent	Site	Result	Attendance	Source
September 27	Lebanon Valley	Villanova Stadium; Villanova, PA	W 19–0		
October 4	Gettysburg	Villanova Stadium; Villanova, PA	L 0–3		
October 11	at NYU	Yankee Stadium; Bronx, NY	L 6–20	40,000	
October 18	Boston College	Philadelphia Municipal Stadium; Philadelphia, PA	W 7–0		
October 25	Temple	Philadelphia Municipal Stadium; Philadelphia, PA	W 8–7	25,000	
November 1	Duke	Philadelphia Municipal Stadium; Philadelphia, PA	L 6–12		
November 8	vs. Bucknell	Brooks Field; Scranton, PA	L 14–20		
November 15	Oglethorpe	Philadelphia Municipal Stadium; Philadelphia, PA	W 13–6		
November 22	Georgetown	Philadelphia Municipal Stadium; Philadelphia, PA	W 13–0		
November 29	Washington State	Franklin Field; Philadelphia, PA	L 0–13	20,000	
