= 1930 Massachusetts Aggies football team =

American college football season

1930 Massachusetts Aggies football
- Conference: Independent
- Record: 1–8
- Head coach: Charles McGeoch (3rd season)
- Home stadium: Alumni Field

1930 Eastern college football independents records
	Conf.			Overall
Team	W	L	T	W		L		T
Colgate		–		9	–	1	–	0
Fordham		–		8	–	1	–	0
No. 9 Army		–		9	–	1	–	1
No. 8 Dartmouth		–		7	–	1	–	1
St. John's		–		7	–	1	–	0
NYU		–		7	–	3	–	0
Cornell		–		6	–	2	–	0
Pittsburgh		–		6	–	2	–	1
Washington & Jefferson		–		6	–	2	–	1
Tufts		–		5	–	2	–	0
Temple		–		7	–	3	–	0
Bucknell		–		6	–	3	–	0
Carnegie Tech		–		6	–	3	–	0
Duquesne		–		6	–	3	–	0
Syracuse		–		5	–	2	–	2
Yale		–		5	–	2	–	2
CCNY		–		5	–	2	–	1
Brown		–		6	–	3	–	1
Drexel		–		6	–	3	–	1
Franklin & Marshall		–		5	–	3	–	1
Manhattan		–		4	–	3	–	1
Columbia		–		5	–	4	–	0
Penn		–		5	–	4	–	0
Boston College		–		5	–	5	–	0
Villanova		–		5	–	5	–	0
Penn State		–		3	–	4	–	2
Harvard		–		3	–	4	–	1
Providence		–		3	–	4	–	1
Princeton		–		1	–	5	–	1
Boston University		–		1	–	7	–	1
Vermont		–		1	–	7	–	1
Massachusetts		–		1	–	8	–	0
Rankings from Dickinson System

The 1930 Massachusetts Aggies football team represented Massachusetts Agricultural College in the 1930 college football season. The team was coached by Charles McGeoch and played its home games at Alumni Field in Amherst, Massachusetts. The 1930 season was the team's last as M.A.C., as the school would change their name to Massachusetts State College the following year. Massachusetts finished the season with a record of 1–8.

== Schedule ==
Date	Opponent	Site	Result	Source
September 27	Bates	Alumni Field; Amherst, MA	L 0–26	
October 4	at Bowdoin	Whittier Field; Brunswick, ME	L 0–45	
October 11	at Middlebury	Porter Field; Middlebury, VT	W 7–0	
October 18	at CCNY	Lewisohn Stadium; New York, NY	L 7–37	
October 25	Worcester Tech	Alumni Field; Amherst, MA	L 0–6	
November 1	Amherst	Alumni Field; Amherst, MA	L 6–22	
November 8	at Springfield	Pratt Field; Springfield, MA	L 0–57	
November 15	Norwich	Alumni Field; Amherst, MA	L 6–13	
November 22	at Tufts	Tufts Oval; Somerville, MA	L 6–42	
