= 1930 NYU Violets football team =

American college football season

1930 NYU Violets football
- Conference: Independent
- Record: 7–3
- Head coach: Chick Meehan (6th season)
- Home stadium: Ohio Field; Yankee Stadium; Polo Grounds

1930 Eastern college football independents records
	Conf.			Overall
Team	W	L	T	W		L		T
Colgate		–		9	–	1	–	0
Fordham		–		8	–	1	–	0
No. 9 Army		–		9	–	1	–	1
No. 8 Dartmouth		–		7	–	1	–	1
St. John's		–		7	–	1	–	0
NYU		–		7	–	3	–	0
Cornell		–		6	–	2	–	0
Pittsburgh		–		6	–	2	–	1
Washington & Jefferson		–		6	–	2	–	1
Tufts		–		5	–	2	–	0
Temple		–		7	–	3	–	0
Bucknell		–		6	–	3	–	0
Carnegie Tech		–		6	–	3	–	0
Duquesne		–		6	–	3	–	0
Syracuse		–		5	–	2	–	2
Yale		–		5	–	2	–	2
CCNY		–		5	–	2	–	1
Brown		–		6	–	3	–	1
Drexel		–		6	–	3	–	1
Franklin & Marshall		–		5	–	3	–	1
Manhattan		–		4	–	3	–	1
Columbia		–		5	–	4	–	0
Penn		–		5	–	4	–	0
Boston College		–		5	–	5	–	0
Villanova		–		5	–	5	–	0
Penn State		–		3	–	4	–	2
Harvard		–		3	–	4	–	1
Providence		–		3	–	4	–	1
Princeton		–		1	–	5	–	1
Boston University		–		1	–	7	–	1
Vermont		–		1	–	7	–	1
Massachusetts		–		1	–	8	–	0
Rankings from Dickinson System

The 1930 NYU Violets football team was an American football team that represented New York University as an independent during the 1930 college football season. In their sixth year under head coach Chick Meehan, the team compiled a 7–3 record.

== Schedule ==
Date	Opponent	Site	Result	Attendance	Source
September 27	Hobart	Ohio Field; Bronx, NY	W 35–0	15,000	
October 4	West Virginia Wesleyan	Yankee Stadium; Bronx, NY	W 41–6	20,000	
October 11	Villanova	Yankee Stadium; Bronx, NY	W 20–6	40,000	
October 18	Missouri	Yankee Stadium; Bronx, NY	W 38–0	27,000	
October 25	vs. Fordham	Yankee Stadium; Bronx, NY	L 0–7	78,500	
November 1	at Carnegie Tech	Pitt Stadium; Pittsburgh, PA	W 20–7	25,000	
November 8	Georgia	Polo Grounds; New York, NY	L 6–7	45,000	
November 15	Georgetown	Yankee Stadium; Bronx, NY	W 2–0	22,000	
November 22	Rutgers	Yankee Stadium; Bronx, NY	W 33–0	18,000	
December 6	Colgate	Yankee Stadium; Bronx, NY	L 6–7	20,000	
