= 1930 Boston University Pioneers football team =

American college football season

1930 Boston University Pioneers football
- Conference: Independent
- Record: 1–7–1
- Head coach: Hilary Mahaney (1st season)
- Home stadium: Nickerson Field

1930 Eastern college football independents records
	Conf.			Overall
Team	W	L	T	W		L		T
Colgate		–		9	–	1	–	0
Fordham		–		8	–	1	–	0
No. 9 Army		–		9	–	1	–	1
No. 8 Dartmouth		–		7	–	1	–	1
St. John's		–		7	–	1	–	0
NYU		–		7	–	3	–	0
Cornell		–		6	–	2	–	0
Pittsburgh		–		6	–	2	–	1
Washington & Jefferson		–		6	–	2	–	1
Tufts		–		5	–	2	–	0
Temple		–		7	–	3	–	0
Bucknell		–		6	–	3	–	0
Carnegie Tech		–		6	–	3	–	0
Duquesne		–		6	–	3	–	0
Syracuse		–		5	–	2	–	2
Yale		–		5	–	2	–	2
CCNY		–		5	–	2	–	1
Brown		–		6	–	3	–	1
Drexel		–		6	–	3	–	1
Franklin & Marshall		–		5	–	3	–	1
Manhattan		–		4	–	3	–	1
Columbia		–		5	–	4	–	0
Penn		–		5	–	4	–	0
Boston College		–		5	–	5	–	0
Villanova		–		5	–	5	–	0
Penn State		–		3	–	4	–	2
Harvard		–		3	–	4	–	1
Providence		–		3	–	4	–	1
Princeton		–		1	–	5	–	1
Boston University		–		1	–	7	–	1
Vermont		–		1	–	7	–	1
Massachusetts		–		1	–	8	–	0
Rankings from Dickinson System

The 1930 Boston University Pioneers football team was an American football team that represented Boston University as an independent during the 1930 college football season. In its first season under head coach Hilary Mahaney, the team compiled a 1–7–1 record, was shut out in five of nine games, and was outscored by a total of 235 to 33.

== Schedule ==
Date	Opponent	Site	Result	Attendance	Source
September 27	at Army	Michie Stadium; West Point, NY	L 0–39		
October 4	New Hampshire	Nickerson Field; Weston, MA	T 12–12		
October 11	at Dartmouth	Memorial Field; Hanover, NH	L 0–74		
October 18	Middlebury	Nickerson Field; Weston, MA	W 7–0		
October 25	Springfield	Nickerson Field; Weston, MA	L 0–20		
November 1	at Rhode Island State	Kingston, RI	L 0–14		
November 8	DePauw	Nickerson Field; Weston, MA	L 7–22		
November 15	Tufts	Nickerson Field; Weston, MA	L 0–7		
November 22	at Boston College	Fenway Park; Boston, MA (rivalry)	L 7–47		
