= 1930 Penn Quakers football team =

American college football season

1930 Penn Quakers football
- Conference: Independent
- Record: 5–4
- Head coach: Lud Wray (1st season)
- Captain: Dick Gentle
- Home stadium: Franklin Field

1930 Eastern college football independents records
| | Conf. | | | Overall |
| Team | W | L | T | W | | L | | T |
|---|---|---|---|---|---|---|---|---|
| Colgate | | – | | 9 | – | 1 | – | 0 |
| Fordham | | – | | 8 | – | 1 | – | 0 |
| No. 9 Army | | – | | 9 | – | 1 | – | 1 |
| No. 8 Dartmouth | | – | | 7 | – | 1 | – | 1 |
| St. John's | | – | | 7 | – | 1 | – | 0 |
| NYU | | – | | 7 | – | 3 | – | 0 |
| Cornell | | – | | 6 | – | 2 | – | 0 |
| Pittsburgh | | – | | 6 | – | 2 | – | 1 |
| Washington & Jefferson | | – | | 6 | – | 2 | – | 1 |
| Tufts | | – | | 5 | – | 2 | – | 0 |
| Temple | | – | | 7 | – | 3 | – | 0 |
| Bucknell | | – | | 6 | – | 3 | – | 0 |
| Carnegie Tech | | – | | 6 | – | 3 | – | 0 |
| Duquesne | | – | | 6 | – | 3 | – | 0 |
| Syracuse | | – | | 5 | – | 2 | – | 2 |
| Yale | | – | | 5 | – | 2 | – | 2 |
| CCNY | | – | | 5 | – | 2 | – | 1 |
| Brown | | – | | 6 | – | 3 | – | 1 |
| Drexel | | – | | 6 | – | 3 | – | 1 |
| Franklin & Marshall | | – | | 5 | – | 3 | – | 1 |
| Manhattan | | – | | 4 | – | 3 | – | 1 |
| Columbia | | – | | 5 | – | 4 | – | 0 |
| Penn | | – | | 5 | – | 4 | – | 0 |
| Boston College | | – | | 5 | – | 5 | – | 0 |
| Villanova | | – | | 5 | – | 5 | – | 0 |
| Penn State | | – | | 3 | – | 4 | – | 2 |
| Harvard | | – | | 3 | – | 4 | – | 1 |
| Providence | | – | | 3 | – | 4 | – | 1 |
| Princeton | | – | | 1 | – | 5 | – | 1 |
| Boston University | | – | | 1 | – | 7 | – | 1 |
| Vermont | | – | | 1 | – | 7 | – | 1 |
| Massachusetts | | – | | 1 | – | 8 | – | 0 |
Rankings from Dickinson System

The 1930 Penn Quakers football team was an American football team that represented the University of Pennsylvania as an independent during the 1930 college football season. In their first and only season under head coach Lud Wray, the Quakers compiled a 5–4 record and outscored their opponents 225 to 145. The team played its home games at Franklin Field in Philadelphia.

Near-sighted guard Frank Yablonski wore a customized helmet which included optical lenses.

== Schedule ==
| Date | Opponent | Site | Result | Attendance | Source |
|---|---|---|---|---|---|
| October 4 | Swarthmore | Franklin Field; Philadelphia, PA | W 63–0 | 40,000 | |
| October 11 | Virginia | Franklin Field; Philadelphia, PA | W 40–6 | | |
| October 18 | at Wisconsin | Camp Randall Stadium; Madison, WI | L 0–27 | 18,175 | |
| October 25 | Lehigh | Franklin Field; Philadelphia, PA | W 40–0 | 25,000 | |
| November 1 | Kansas | Franklin Field; Philadelphia, PA | W 21–6 | 62,000 | |
| November 8 | Notre Dame | Franklin Field; Philadelphia, PA | L 20–60 | 75,657 | |
| November 15 | Georgia Tech | Franklin Field; Philadelphia, PA | W 34–7 | | |
| November 27 | Cornell | Franklin Field; Philadelphia, PA (rivalry) | L 7–13 | 65,000 | |
| December 6 | Navy | Franklin Field; Philadelphia, PA | L 0–26 | 60,000 | |
