= 1930 Bucknell Bison football team =

American college football season

1930 Bucknell Bison football
- Conference: Independent
- Record: 6–3
- Head coach: Carl Snavely (4th season)
- Home stadium: Memorial Stadium

1930 Eastern college football independents records
	Conf.			Overall
Team	W	L	T	W		L		T
Colgate		–		9	–	1	–	0
Fordham		–		8	–	1	–	0
No. 9 Army		–		9	–	1	–	1
No. 8 Dartmouth		–		7	–	1	–	1
St. John's		–		7	–	1	–	0
NYU		–		7	–	3	–	0
Cornell		–		6	–	2	–	0
Pittsburgh		–		6	–	2	–	1
Washington & Jefferson		–		6	–	2	–	1
Tufts		–		5	–	2	–	0
Temple		–		7	–	3	–	0
Bucknell		–		6	–	3	–	0
Carnegie Tech		–		6	–	3	–	0
Duquesne		–		6	–	3	–	0
Syracuse		–		5	–	2	–	2
Yale		–		5	–	2	–	2
CCNY		–		5	–	2	–	1
Brown		–		6	–	3	–	1
Drexel		–		6	–	3	–	1
Franklin & Marshall		–		5	–	3	–	1
Manhattan		–		4	–	3	–	1
Columbia		–		5	–	4	–	0
Penn		–		5	–	4	–	0
Boston College		–		5	–	5	–	0
Villanova		–		5	–	5	–	0
Penn State		–		3	–	4	–	2
Harvard		–		3	–	4	–	1
Providence		–		3	–	4	–	1
Princeton		–		1	–	5	–	1
Boston University		–		1	–	7	–	1
Vermont		–		1	–	7	–	1
Massachusetts		–		1	–	8	–	0
Rankings from Dickinson System

The 1930 Bucknell Bison football team was an American football team that represented Bucknell University as an independent during the 1930 college football season. In its fourth season under head coach Carl Snavely, the team compiled a 6–3 record.

The team played its home games at Memorial Stadium in Lewisburg, Pennsylvania.

== Schedule ==
Date	Opponent	Site	Result	Attendance	Source
September 27	Geneva	Memorial Stadium; Lewisburg, PA	W 46–6		
October 4	Albright	Memorial Stadium; Lewisburg, PA	W 27–0		
October 10	at Temple	Temple Stadium; Philadelphia, PA	L 6–7	35,000	
October 18	St. Thomas (PA)	Memorial Stadium; Lewisburg, PA	W 14–0		
October 25	at Gettysburg	Gettysburg, PA	W 26–6		
November 1	Penn State^{†}	Memorial Stadium; Lewisburg, PA	W 19–7	15,000	
November 8	vs. Villanova	Brooks Field; Scranton, PA	W 20–14		
November 15	at Washington & Jefferson	College Park; Washington, PA	L 6–7		
November 22	at Fordham	Polo Grounds; New York, NY	L 0–12	25,000	
^{†}Homecoming
