= 1930 Syracuse Orangemen football team =

American college football season

1930 Syracuse Orangemen football
- Conference: Independent
- Record: 5–2–2
- Head coach: Vic Hanson (1st season)
- Captain: Milton Berner
- Home stadium: Archbold Stadium

1930 Eastern college football independents records
	Conf.			Overall
Team	W	L	T	W		L		T
Colgate		–		9	–	1	–	0
Fordham		–		8	–	1	–	0
No. 9 Army		–		9	–	1	–	1
No. 8 Dartmouth		–		7	–	1	–	1
St. John's		–		7	–	1	–	0
NYU		–		7	–	3	–	0
Cornell		–		6	–	2	–	0
Pittsburgh		–		6	–	2	–	1
Washington & Jefferson		–		6	–	2	–	1
Tufts		–		5	–	2	–	0
Temple		–		7	–	3	–	0
Bucknell		–		6	–	3	–	0
Carnegie Tech		–		6	–	3	–	0
Duquesne		–		6	–	3	–	0
Syracuse		–		5	–	2	–	2
Yale		–		5	–	2	–	2
CCNY		–		5	–	2	–	1
Brown		–		6	–	3	–	1
Drexel		–		6	–	3	–	1
Franklin & Marshall		–		5	–	3	–	1
Manhattan		–		4	–	3	–	1
Columbia		–		5	–	4	–	0
Penn		–		5	–	4	–	0
Boston College		–		5	–	5	–	0
Villanova		–		5	–	5	–	0
Penn State		–		3	–	4	–	2
Harvard		–		3	–	4	–	1
Providence		–		3	–	4	–	1
Princeton		–		1	–	5	–	1
Boston University		–		1	–	7	–	1
Vermont		–		1	–	7	–	1
Massachusetts		–		1	–	8	–	0
Rankings from Dickinson System

The 1930 Syracuse Orangemen football team represented Syracuse University as an independent during the 1930 college football season. The Orangemen were led by first-year head coach Vic Hanson and played their home games at Archbold Stadium in Syracuse, New York. Hanson was previously an All-American football and basketball player for the Orangemen in the 1920s, and was hired as coach after serving as an assistant in 1928 and 1929.

== Schedule ==
Date	Opponent	Site	Result	Attendance	Source
September 27	RPI	Archbold Stadium; Syracuse, NY	W 55–0	15,000	
October 4	Hobart	Archbold Stadium; Syracuse, NY	W 49–0	15,000	
October 11	Rutgers	Archbold Stadium; Syracuse, NY	W 27–0	12,000	
October 18	Pittsburgh	Archbold Stadium; Syracuse, NY (rivalry)	L 0–14	15,000	
October 25	St. Lawrence	Archbold Stadium; Syracuse, NY	W 34–6	2,000	
November 1	Brown	Archbold Stadium; Syracuse, NY	T 16–16	12,000	
November 8	at Penn State	New Beaver Field; State College, PA (rivalry)	T 0–0	10,000	
November 15	Colgate	Archbold Stadium; Syracuse, NY (rivalry)	L 7–36	30,000	
November 27	at Columbia	Baker Field; New York, NY	W 19–7	25,000	
