= 1930 St. John's Redmen football team =

American college football season

1930 St. John's Redmen football
- Conference: Independent
- Record: 7–1
- Head coach: Ray Lynch (8th season)
- Captain: Albert Pace
- Home stadium: Dexter Park

1930 Eastern college football independents records
	Conf.			Overall
Team	W	L	T	W		L		T
Colgate		–		9	–	1	–	0
Fordham		–		8	–	1	–	0
No. 9 Army		–		9	–	1	–	1
No. 8 Dartmouth		–		7	–	1	–	1
St. John's		–		7	–	1	–	0
NYU		–		7	–	3	–	0
Cornell		–		6	–	2	–	0
Pittsburgh		–		6	–	2	–	1
Washington & Jefferson		–		6	–	2	–	1
Tufts		–		5	–	2	–	0
Temple		–		7	–	3	–	0
Bucknell		–		6	–	3	–	0
Carnegie Tech		–		6	–	3	–	0
Duquesne		–		6	–	3	–	0
Syracuse		–		5	–	2	–	2
Yale		–		5	–	2	–	2
CCNY		–		5	–	2	–	1
Brown		–		6	–	3	–	1
Drexel		–		6	–	3	–	1
Franklin & Marshall		–		5	–	3	–	1
Manhattan		–		4	–	3	–	1
Columbia		–		5	–	4	–	0
Penn		–		5	–	4	–	0
Boston College		–		5	–	5	–	0
Villanova		–		5	–	5	–	0
Penn State		–		3	–	4	–	2
Harvard		–		3	–	4	–	1
Providence		–		3	–	4	–	1
Princeton		–		1	–	5	–	1
Boston University		–		1	–	7	–	1
Vermont		–		1	–	7	–	1
Massachusetts		–		1	–	8	–	0
Rankings from Dickinson System

The 1930 St. John's Redmen football team was an American football team that represented St. John's College of New York City during the 1930 college football season. Led by eighth-year head coach Ray Lynch and quarterback Bob Sheppard, the team compiled a 7–1, its first winning season since 1923. The team played its home games at Dexter Park in Queens.

== Schedule ==
Date	Opponent	Site	Result	Attendance	Source
October 10	Niagara	Dexter Park; Queens, NY	W 20–7		
October 18	Drexel	Dexter Park; Queens, NY	W 6–0	3,000	
October 24	Washington College	Dexter Park; Queens, NY	W 33–0		
November 1	at St. Thomas (PA)	Scranton, PA	L 6–13		
November 8	at CCNY	Lewisohn Stadium; New York, NY	W 12–0		
November 15	Providence	Dexter Park; Queens, NY	W 13–6		
November 22	Manhattan	Dexter Park; Queens, NY	W 21–19	8,000	
November 30	DePaul	Soldier Field; Chicago, IL	W 4–0		
