= 1930 Duquesne Dukes football team =

American college football season

1930 Duquesne Dukes football
- Conference: Independent
- Record: 7–3
- Head coach: Elmer Layden (4th season)
- Home stadium: Forbes Field

1930 Eastern college football independents records
	Conf.			Overall
Team	W	L	T	W		L		T
Colgate		–		9	–	1	–	0
Fordham		–		8	–	1	–	0
No. 9 Army		–		9	–	1	–	1
No. 8 Dartmouth		–		7	–	1	–	1
St. John's		–		7	–	1	–	0
NYU		–		7	–	3	–	0
Cornell		–		6	–	2	–	0
Pittsburgh		–		6	–	2	–	1
Washington & Jefferson		–		6	–	2	–	1
Tufts		–		5	–	2	–	0
Temple		–		7	–	3	–	0
Bucknell		–		6	–	3	–	0
Carnegie Tech		–		6	–	3	–	0
Duquesne		–		6	–	3	–	0
Syracuse		–		5	–	2	–	2
Yale		–		5	–	2	–	2
CCNY		–		5	–	2	–	1
Brown		–		6	–	3	–	1
Drexel		–		6	–	3	–	1
Franklin & Marshall		–		5	–	3	–	1
Manhattan		–		4	–	3	–	1
Columbia		–		5	–	4	–	0
Penn		–		5	–	4	–	0
Boston College		–		5	–	5	–	0
Villanova		–		5	–	5	–	0
Penn State		–		3	–	4	–	2
Harvard		–		3	–	4	–	1
Providence		–		3	–	4	–	1
Princeton		–		1	–	5	–	1
Boston University		–		1	–	7	–	1
Vermont		–		1	–	7	–	1
Massachusetts		–		1	–	8	–	0
Rankings from Dickinson System

The 1930 Duquesne Dukes football team was an American football team that represented Duquesne University as an independent during the 1930 college football season. In its fourth season under head coach Elmer Layden, Duquesne compiled a 7–3 record and outscored opponents by a total of 131 to 56. The team played its home games at Forbes Field in Pittsburgh.

== Schedule ==
Date	Opponent	Site	Result	Attendance	Source
September 19	West Virginia	Forbes Field; Pittsburgh, PA	L 0–7	25,000	
September 26	Slippery Rock	Forbes Field; Pittsburgh, PA	W 27–0	8,000	
October 3	Detroit Tech	Forbes Field; Pittsburgh, PA	W 38–0	10,000	
October 10	at Loyola (IL)	Loyola Stadium; Chicago, IL	W 7–6		
October 17	Howard	Forbes Field; Pittsburgh, PA	W 14–9	5,000	
October 24	Catholic University	Forbes Field; Pittsburgh, PA	W 12–0		
November 7	North Dakota	Forbes Field; Pittsburgh, PA	L 6–14		
November 15	at Geneva	Reeves Stadium; Beaver Falls, PA	L 0–7		
November 22	West Virginia Wesleyan	Forbes Field; Pittsburgh, PA	W 12–7		
November 27	Providence	Forbes Field; Pittsburgh, PA	W 15–6		
