= 1930 Army Cadets football team =

American college football season

1930 Army Cadets football
- Conference: Independent
- Record: 9–1–1
- Head coach: Ralph Sasse (1st season)
- Captain: Charles Humber
- Home stadium: Michie Stadium

1930 Eastern college football independents records
| | Conf. | | | Overall |
| Team | W | L | T | W | | L | | T |
|---|---|---|---|---|---|---|---|---|
| Colgate | | – | | 9 | – | 1 | – | 0 |
| Fordham | | – | | 8 | – | 1 | – | 0 |
| No. 9 Army | | – | | 9 | – | 1 | – | 1 |
| No. 8 Dartmouth | | – | | 7 | – | 1 | – | 1 |
| St. John's | | – | | 7 | – | 1 | – | 0 |
| NYU | | – | | 7 | – | 3 | – | 0 |
| Cornell | | – | | 6 | – | 2 | – | 0 |
| Pittsburgh | | – | | 6 | – | 2 | – | 1 |
| Washington & Jefferson | | – | | 6 | – | 2 | – | 1 |
| Tufts | | – | | 5 | – | 2 | – | 0 |
| Temple | | – | | 7 | – | 3 | – | 0 |
| Bucknell | | – | | 6 | – | 3 | – | 0 |
| Carnegie Tech | | – | | 6 | – | 3 | – | 0 |
| Duquesne | | – | | 6 | – | 3 | – | 0 |
| Syracuse | | – | | 5 | – | 2 | – | 2 |
| Yale | | – | | 5 | – | 2 | – | 2 |
| CCNY | | – | | 5 | – | 2 | – | 1 |
| Brown | | – | | 6 | – | 3 | – | 1 |
| Drexel | | – | | 6 | – | 3 | – | 1 |
| Franklin & Marshall | | – | | 5 | – | 3 | – | 1 |
| Manhattan | | – | | 4 | – | 3 | – | 1 |
| Columbia | | – | | 5 | – | 4 | – | 0 |
| Penn | | – | | 5 | – | 4 | – | 0 |
| Boston College | | – | | 5 | – | 5 | – | 0 |
| Villanova | | – | | 5 | – | 5 | – | 0 |
| Penn State | | – | | 3 | – | 4 | – | 2 |
| Harvard | | – | | 3 | – | 4 | – | 1 |
| Providence | | – | | 3 | – | 4 | – | 1 |
| Princeton | | – | | 1 | – | 5 | – | 1 |
| Boston University | | – | | 1 | – | 7 | – | 1 |
| Vermont | | – | | 1 | – | 7 | – | 1 |
| Massachusetts | | – | | 1 | – | 8 | – | 0 |
Rankings from Dickinson System

The 1930 Army Cadets football team represented the United States Military Academy as an independent during the 1930 college football season. In their first season under head coach Ralph Sasse, the Cadets compiled a 9–1–1 record, shut out seven of their eleven opponents, and outscored all opponents by a combined total of 268 to 22, an average of 24.4 points scored and 2.0 points allowed per game. In the annual Army–Navy Game, the Cadets defeated the Midshipmen 6–0. The team's only blemish was a 7–6 loss to undefeated national champion Notre Dame team in Knute Rockne's final year as head coach.

Two Army players were recognized on the All-America team. Tackle Jack Price received first-team honors from the North American Newspaper Association (NANA) and the Los Angeles Times. Guard Charles Humber received second-team honors from the International News Service (INS) and third-team honors from the Associated Press (AP).

== Schedule ==
| Date | Opponent | Site | Result | Attendance | Source |
|---|---|---|---|---|---|
| September 27 | Boston University | Michie Stadium; West Point, NY | W 39–0 | | |
| October 4 | Furman | Michie Stadium; West Point, NY | W 54–0 | | |
| October 11 | Swarthmore | Michie Stadium; West Point, NY | W 39–0 | | |
| October 18 | at Harvard | Harvard Stadium; Boston, MA | W 6–0 | 60,000 | |
| October 25 | at Yale | Yale Bowl; New Haven, CT | T 7–7 | 77,000 | |
| November 1 | North Dakota | Michie Stadium; West Point, NY | W 33–6 | 15,000 | |
| November 8 | vs. Illinois | Yankee Stadium; Bronx, NY | W 13–0 | 68,186 | |
| November 15 | Kentucky Wesleyan | Michie Stadium; West Point, NY | W 47–2 | | |
| November 22 | Ursinus | Michie Stadium; West Point, NY | W 18–0 | | |
| November 29 | vs. Notre Dame | Soldier Field; Chicago, IL (rivalry) | L 6–7 | 110,000 | |
| December 13 | vs. Navy | Yankee Stadium; Bronx, NY (Army–Navy Game) | W 6–0 | 75,000 | |
