= 1930 Harvard Crimson football team =

American college football season

1930 Harvard Crimson football
- Conference: Independent
- Record: 3–4–1
- Head coach: Arnold Horween (5th season)
- Captain: Ben Ticknor
- Home stadium: Harvard Stadium

1930 Eastern college football independents records
	Conf.			Overall
Team	W	L	T	W		L		T
Colgate		–		9	–	1	–	0
Fordham		–		8	–	1	–	0
No. 9 Army		–		9	–	1	–	1
No. 8 Dartmouth		–		7	–	1	–	1
St. John's		–		7	–	1	–	0
NYU		–		7	–	3	–	0
Cornell		–		6	–	2	–	0
Pittsburgh		–		6	–	2	–	1
Washington & Jefferson		–		6	–	2	–	1
Tufts		–		5	–	2	–	0
Temple		–		7	–	3	–	0
Bucknell		–		6	–	3	–	0
Carnegie Tech		–		6	–	3	–	0
Duquesne		–		6	–	3	–	0
Syracuse		–		5	–	2	–	2
Yale		–		5	–	2	–	2
CCNY		–		5	–	2	–	1
Brown		–		6	–	3	–	1
Drexel		–		6	–	3	–	1
Franklin & Marshall		–		5	–	3	–	1
Manhattan		–		4	–	3	–	1
Columbia		–		5	–	4	–	0
Penn		–		5	–	4	–	0
Boston College		–		5	–	5	–	0
Villanova		–		5	–	5	–	0
Penn State		–		3	–	4	–	2
Harvard		–		3	–	4	–	1
Providence		–		3	–	4	–	1
Princeton		–		1	–	5	–	1
Boston University		–		1	–	7	–	1
Vermont		–		1	–	7	–	1
Massachusetts		–		1	–	8	–	0
Rankings from Dickinson System

The 1930 Harvard Crimson football team represented Harvard University. They were led by fifth-year head coach Arnold Horween and played their home games at Harvard Stadium.

== Schedule ==
Date	Opponent	Site	Result	Attendance	Source
October 4	Vermont	Harvard Stadium; Boston, MA	W 35–0		
October 11	Springfield	Harvard Stadium; Boston, MA	W 27–0		
October 18	Army	Harvard Stadium; Boston, MA	L 0–6	60,000	
October 25	Dartmouth	Harvard Stadium; Boston, MA (rivalry)	L 2–7	40,000	
November 1	William & Mary	Harvard Stadium; Boston, MA	T 13–13		
November 8	Michigan	Harvard Stadium; Boston, MA	L 3–6	43,913	
November 15	Holy Cross	Harvard Stadium; Boston, MA	L 0–27	35,000	
November 22	at Yale	Yale Bowl; New Haven, CT (rivalry)	W 13–0	78,000	
