= 1930 Penn State Nittany Lions football team =

American college football season

1930 Penn State Nittany Lions football
- Conference: Independent
- Record: 3–4–2
- Head coach: Bob Higgins (1st season)
- Captain: Frank Diedrich
- Home stadium: New Beaver Field

1930 Eastern college football independents records
| | Conf. | | | Overall |
| Team | W | L | T | W | | L | | T |
|---|---|---|---|---|---|---|---|---|
| Colgate | | – | | 9 | – | 1 | – | 0 |
| Fordham | | – | | 8 | – | 1 | – | 0 |
| No. 9 Army | | – | | 9 | – | 1 | – | 1 |
| No. 8 Dartmouth | | – | | 7 | – | 1 | – | 1 |
| St. John's | | – | | 7 | – | 1 | – | 0 |
| NYU | | – | | 7 | – | 3 | – | 0 |
| Cornell | | – | | 6 | – | 2 | – | 0 |
| Pittsburgh | | – | | 6 | – | 2 | – | 1 |
| Washington & Jefferson | | – | | 6 | – | 2 | – | 1 |
| Tufts | | – | | 5 | – | 2 | – | 0 |
| Temple | | – | | 7 | – | 3 | – | 0 |
| Bucknell | | – | | 6 | – | 3 | – | 0 |
| Carnegie Tech | | – | | 6 | – | 3 | – | 0 |
| Duquesne | | – | | 6 | – | 3 | – | 0 |
| Syracuse | | – | | 5 | – | 2 | – | 2 |
| Yale | | – | | 5 | – | 2 | – | 2 |
| CCNY | | – | | 5 | – | 2 | – | 1 |
| Brown | | – | | 6 | – | 3 | – | 1 |
| Drexel | | – | | 6 | – | 3 | – | 1 |
| Franklin & Marshall | | – | | 5 | – | 3 | – | 1 |
| Manhattan | | – | | 4 | – | 3 | – | 1 |
| Columbia | | – | | 5 | – | 4 | – | 0 |
| Penn | | – | | 5 | – | 4 | – | 0 |
| Boston College | | – | | 5 | – | 5 | – | 0 |
| Villanova | | – | | 5 | – | 5 | – | 0 |
| Penn State | | – | | 3 | – | 4 | – | 2 |
| Harvard | | – | | 3 | – | 4 | – | 1 |
| Providence | | – | | 3 | – | 4 | – | 1 |
| Princeton | | – | | 1 | – | 5 | – | 1 |
| Boston University | | – | | 1 | – | 7 | – | 1 |
| Vermont | | – | | 1 | – | 7 | – | 1 |
| Massachusetts | | – | | 1 | – | 8 | – | 0 |
Rankings from Dickinson System

The 1930 Penn State Nittany Lions football team represented the Pennsylvania State University as an independent during the 1930 college football season. The team was coached by Bob Higgins and played its home games in New Beaver Field in State College, Pennsylvania.

== Schedule ==
| Date | Opponent | Site | Result | Attendance | Source |
|---|---|---|---|---|---|
| September 27 | Niagara | New Beaver Field; State College, PA | W 31–14 | 4,000 | |
| October 4 | Lebanon Valley | New Beaver Field; State College, PA | W 27–0 | 4,000 | |
| October 11 | Marshall | New Beaver Field; State College, PA | W 65–0 | 5,000 | |
| October 18 | at Lafayette | Fisher Field; Easton, PA | T 0–0 | | |
| October 25 | Colgate^{†} | New Beaver Field; State College, PA | L 0–40 | 15,000 | |
| November 1 | at Bucknell | Memorial Stadium; Lewisburg, PA | L 7–19 | 15,000 | |
| November 8 | Syracuse | New Beaver Field; State College, PA (rivalry) | T 0–0 | 7,000 | |
| November 15 | at Iowa | Iowa Stadium; Iowa City, IA | L 0–19 | 20,000 | |
| November 26 | at Pittsburgh | Pitt Stadium; Pittsburgh, PA (rivalry) | L 12–19 | 10,000 | |
^{†}Homecoming
