= 1930 Colgate football team =

American college football season

1930 Colgate football
- Conference: Independent
- Record: 9–1
- Head coach: Andrew Kerr (2nd season)
- Captain: J. Leslie Hart
- Home stadium: Whitnall Field

1930 Eastern college football independents records
	Conf.			Overall
Team	W	L	T	W		L		T
Colgate		–		9	–	1	–	0
Fordham		–		8	–	1	–	0
No. 9 Army		–		9	–	1	–	1
No. 8 Dartmouth		–		7	–	1	–	1
St. John's		–		7	–	1	–	0
NYU		–		7	–	3	–	0
Cornell		–		6	–	2	–	0
Pittsburgh		–		6	–	2	–	1
Washington & Jefferson		–		6	–	2	–	1
Tufts		–		5	–	2	–	0
Temple		–		7	–	3	–	0
Bucknell		–		6	–	3	–	0
Carnegie Tech		–		6	–	3	–	0
Duquesne		–		6	–	3	–	0
Syracuse		–		5	–	2	–	2
Yale		–		5	–	2	–	2
CCNY		–		5	–	2	–	1
Brown		–		6	–	3	–	1
Drexel		–		6	–	3	–	1
Franklin & Marshall		–		5	–	3	–	1
Manhattan		–		4	–	3	–	1
Columbia		–		5	–	4	–	0
Penn		–		5	–	4	–	0
Boston College		–		5	–	5	–	0
Villanova		–		5	–	5	–	0
Penn State		–		3	–	4	–	2
Harvard		–		3	–	4	–	1
Providence		–		3	–	4	–	1
Princeton		–		1	–	5	–	1
Boston University		–		1	–	7	–	1
Vermont		–		1	–	7	–	1
Massachusetts		–		1	–	8	–	0
Rankings from Dickinson System

The 1930 Colgate football team was an American football team that represented Colgate University as an independent during the 1930 college football season. In its second season under head coach Andrew Kerr, the team compiled a 9–1 record, shut out seven of ten opponents, and outscored all opponents by a total of 383 to 27.

Fullback Leonard Macaluso led the country in scoring with 145 points. His points were scored on 19 touchdowns, 28 points after touchdown, and one field goal. He was also a consensus first-team pick on the 1930 All-America team. He was also the subject of press reports that he had played in two games in 1927 and was therefore ineligible. The team's other notable teams included:

- Halfback J. Leslie Hart was the team captain and a triple-threat man. He also competed for Colgate in track. He also was chosen by the Newspaper Enterprise Association (NEA) as a first-team player on the 1930 All-Eastern football team.
- End John Orsi also received first-team All-Eastern honors from the NEA. In Colgate's post-season 7–6 victory over NYU, Orsi scored Colgate's only touchdown and blocked NYU's point after touchdown kick to preserve the victory.

Coach Kerr was an early inductee into the College Football Hall of Fame in 1951.

The team played its home games on Whitnall Field in Hamilton, New York.

== Schedule ==
Date	Opponent	Site	Result	Attendance	Source
September 27	St. Lawrence	Whitnall Field; Hamilton, NY	W 38–0		
October 4	Bethany (WV)	Whitnall Field; Hamilton, NY	W 99–0		
October 11	Lafayette	Whitnall Field; Hamilton, NY	W 41–0	10,000	
October 18	at Michigan State	College Field; East Lansing, MI	L 7–14	12,000	
October 25	at Penn State	New Beaver Field; State College, PA	W 40–0	15,000	
November 1	Mississippi College	Whitnall Field; Hamilton, NY	W 34–0		
November 8	at Columbia	Baker Field; New York, NY	W 54–0	10,000	
November 15	at Syracuse	Archbold Stadium; Syracuse, NY (rivalry)	W 36–7	30,000	
November 27	at Brown	Andrews Field; Providence, RI	W 27–0		
December 6	at NYU	Yankee Stadium; Bronx, NY	W 7–6	20,000	
