= 1930 Princeton Tigers football team =

American college football season

1930 Princeton Tigers football
- Conference: Independent
- Record: 1–5–1
- Head coach: Bill Roper (17th season)
- Captain: Ricardo A. Mestres
- Home stadium: Palmer Stadium

1930 Eastern college football independents records
	Conf.			Overall
Team	W	L	T	W		L		T
Colgate		–		9	–	1	–	0
Fordham		–		8	–	1	–	0
No. 9 Army		–		9	–	1	–	1
No. 8 Dartmouth		–		7	–	1	–	1
St. John's		–		7	–	1	–	0
NYU		–		7	–	3	–	0
Cornell		–		6	–	2	–	0
Pittsburgh		–		6	–	2	–	1
Washington & Jefferson		–		6	–	2	–	1
Tufts		–		5	–	2	–	0
Temple		–		7	–	3	–	0
Bucknell		–		6	–	3	–	0
Carnegie Tech		–		6	–	3	–	0
Duquesne		–		6	–	3	–	0
Syracuse		–		5	–	2	–	2
Yale		–		5	–	2	–	2
CCNY		–		5	–	2	–	1
Brown		–		6	–	3	–	1
Drexel		–		6	–	3	–	1
Franklin & Marshall		–		5	–	3	–	1
Manhattan		–		4	–	3	–	1
Columbia		–		5	–	4	–	0
Penn		–		5	–	4	–	0
Boston College		–		5	–	5	–	0
Villanova		–		5	–	5	–	0
Penn State		–		3	–	4	–	2
Harvard		–		3	–	4	–	1
Providence		–		3	–	4	–	1
Princeton		–		1	–	5	–	1
Boston University		–		1	–	7	–	1
Vermont		–		1	–	7	–	1
Massachusetts		–		1	–	8	–	0
Rankings from Dickinson System

The 1930 Princeton Tigers football team was an American football team that represented Princeton University as an independent during the 1930 college football season. In their 17th and final year under head coach Bill Roper, the Tigers finished with a 1–5–1 record and were outscored by a total of 164 to 55.

Guard Ricardo A. Mestres was elected as the team captain. No Princeton players were selected as first-team honorees on the 1930 College Football All-America Team.

== Schedule ==
Date	Opponent	Site	Result	Attendance	Source
October 4	Amherst	Palmer Stadium; Princeton, NJ	W 23–0	17,000	
October 11	Brown	Palmer Stadium; Princeton, NJ	L 0–7	35,000	
October 18	Cornell	Palmer Stadium; Princeton, NJ	L 7–12	40,000	
October 25	Navy	Palmer Stadium; Princeton, NJ	L 0–31	45,000	
November 1	at Chicago	Stagg Field; Chicago, IL	T 0–0	35,000	
November 8	Lehigh	Palmer Stadium; Princeton, NJ	L 9–13	20,000	
November 15	Yale	Palmer Stadium; Princeton, NJ (rivalry)	L 7–10	60,000	
