= 1930 Drexel Dragons football team =

American college football season

1930 Drexel Dragons football
- Conference: Independent
- Record: 6–3–1
- Head coach: Walter Halas (4th season)
- Captain: Walt McFayden
- Home stadium: Drexel Field

1930 Eastern college football independents records
	Conf.			Overall
Team	W	L	T	W		L		T
Colgate		–		9	–	1	–	0
Fordham		–		8	–	1	–	0
No. 9 Army		–		9	–	1	–	1
No. 8 Dartmouth		–		7	–	1	–	1
St. John's		–		7	–	1	–	0
NYU		–		7	–	3	–	0
Cornell		–		6	–	2	–	0
Pittsburgh		–		6	–	2	–	1
Washington & Jefferson		–		6	–	2	–	1
Tufts		–		5	–	2	–	0
Temple		–		7	–	3	–	0
Bucknell		–		6	–	3	–	0
Carnegie Tech		–		6	–	3	–	0
Duquesne		–		6	–	3	–	0
Syracuse		–		5	–	2	–	2
Yale		–		5	–	2	–	2
CCNY		–		5	–	2	–	1
Brown		–		6	–	3	–	1
Drexel		–		6	–	3	–	1
Franklin & Marshall		–		5	–	3	–	1
Manhattan		–		4	–	3	–	1
Columbia		–		5	–	4	–	0
Penn		–		5	–	4	–	0
Boston College		–		5	–	5	–	0
Villanova		–		5	–	5	–	0
Penn State		–		3	–	4	–	2
Harvard		–		3	–	4	–	1
Providence		–		3	–	4	–	1
Princeton		–		1	–	5	–	1
Boston University		–		1	–	7	–	1
Vermont		–		1	–	7	–	1
Massachusetts		–		1	–	8	–	0
Rankings from Dickinson System

1930 Drexel Dragons football team represented Drexel Institute—now known as Drexel University—in the 1930 college football season. Led by Walter Halas in his fourth season as head coach, the team compiled a record of 6–3–1.

== Schedule ==
Date	Opponent	Site	Result	Attendance	Source
September 20	West Chester	Drexel Field; Philadelphia, PA	L 0–13		
September 27	Swarthmore	Drexel Field; Philadelphia, PA	W 7–0	5,000	
October 4	Cooper Union	Drexel Field; Philadelphia, PA	W 43–0		
October 11	Juniata	Drexel Field; Philadelphia, PA	W 13–8		
October 18	at St. John's (NY)	Dexter Park; Queens, NY	L 0–6	3,000	
October 25	at CCNY	Lewisohn Stadium; New York, NY	L 6–18	3,000	
November 1	at Washington College	Chestertown, MD	W 44–0		
November 8	Saint Joseph's	Drexel Field; Philadelphia, PA	W 18–6	5,000	
November 15	Delaware	Drexel Field; Philadelphia, PA	T 13–13		
November 22	Randolph–Macon	Drexel Field; Philadelphia, PA	W 26–2		

== Roster ==
1930 Drexel Dragons football team roster
Players			Coaches
Offense: Pos. / # / Name / Class; [[American football positions|]] / 1 / Walt McFayden (C) / Jr	Defense: Pos. / # / Name / Class	Special teams: Pos. / # / Name / Class	Head coach: Walter Halas (Illinois); Coordinators/assistant coaches: Albert H. Repscha (Maine); Rae Crowther (Colgate); Legend: (C) Team captain; (S) Suspended; (I) Ineligible; Injured; Redshirt
