= 1930 Michigan State Spartans football team =

American college football season

1930 Michigan State Spartans football
- Conference: Independent
- Record: 5–1–2
- Head coach: Jim Crowley (2nd season)
- Captain: Harold E. Smead
- Home stadium: College Field

1930 Midwestern college football independents records
	Conf.			Overall
Team	W	L	T	W		L		T
No. 1 Notre Dame		–		10	–	0	–	0
Marquette		–		8	–	0	–	1
Haskell		–		9	–	1	–	0
Michigan State		–		5	–	1	–	2
DePaul		–		4	–	2	–	1
Detroit		–		5	–	3	–	2
Kent State		–		3	–	3	–	1
Saint Louis		–		3	–	3	–	2
John Carroll		–		3	–	5	–	2
Loyola (IL)		–		2	–	6	–	1
Michigan Tech		–		1	–	5	–	0
Rankings from Dickinson System

The 1930 Michigan State Spartans football team represented Michigan State College as an independent during the 1930 college football season. In their second season under head coach Jim Crowley, the Spartans compiled a 5–1–2 record and played to a scoreless tie in their annual rivalry game with Michigan. In inter-sectional play, the team defeated Colgate (14–7) and North Dakota State (19–11) and lost to Georgetown (14–13).

The 1930 Michigan State team played "iron man" football with few substitutions. Sophomore halfback Bob Monnett led the way, playing 440 minutes for the team, missing only 40 minutes from the team's eight games. Center Francis "Buddy" Meyers ranked second with 434 minutes played followed by quarterback Roger Grove (419 minutes), end Cecil Fogg (418 minutes), and tackles Ralph Brunette (414 minutes) and Don Ridler (411 minutes).

== Schedule ==
Date	Opponent	Site	Result	Attendance	Source
September 27	Alma	College Field; East Lansing, MI	W 28–0		
October 4	at Michigan	Michigan Stadium; Ann Arbor, MI (rivalry)	T 0–0	50,000	
October 11	Cincinnati	College Field; East Lansing, MI	W 32–0		
October 18	Colgate^{†}	College Field; East Lansing, MI	W 14–7	12,000	
October 25	Case	College Field; East Lansing, MI	W 45–0		
October 31	at Georgetown	Griffith Stadium; Washington, DC	L 13–14		
November 8	North Dakota Agricultural	College Field; East Lansing, MI	W 19–11	9,000	
November 22	Detroit	College Field; East Lansing, MI	T 0–0	> 20,000	
^{†}Homecoming

== Game summaries ==
=== Michigan ===
	1	2	3	4	Total
Spartans	0	0	0	0	0
Wolverines	0	0	0	0	0

On October 4, 1930, the Spartans and Michigan Wolverines played to a scoreless tie in front of a crowd of 49,900 at Michigan Stadium. The game marked the end of a losing streak for the Spartans against the Wolverines dating back to 1916. Michigan had crossed the goal line near the end of the first half, but the play was called back on an offside penalty; the first half ended before Michigan could conclude the drive. One of Michigan's key players, Bill Hewitt sustained an injured ankle while playing at left end of the game; Hewitt did not play the rest of the season. The Associated Press reported that Michigan's passing attack kept the ball in Michigan State's territory much of the time but the Wolverines "lacked the scoring punch."

== Roster ==
The following individuals were awarded varsity letters:

- Gerald Breen, halfback, Holland, MI
- Ralph H. Brunette, tackle, Green Bay, WI
- Abe Eliowitz, fullback, Detroit
- Jacob B. "Jake" Fase, end, Grand Haven, MI
- Cecil C. Fogg, end, Jackson, MI
- Milton C. Gross, guard, Saline, MI
- Roger Grove, quarterback, Sturgis, MI
- George B. Handy, guard, Detroit
- Joseph Kowatch, fullback, Ionia, MI
- Francis H. "Buddy" Meiers, center, Muskegon, MI
- Bob Monnett, halfback, Bucyrus, OH
- Carl A. Nordberg, halfback, St. Joseph, MI
- Don Ridler, tackle, Detroit
- Harold E. Smead (captain), Sturgis, MI
- Claude R. Streb, guard, Birmingham, MI
- Myron L. Vandermeer, end, Grand Rapids, MI

Thomas L. Woodworth also received a letter for his service as the team's manager.
