= 1930 Oklahoma A&M Cowboys football team =

American college football season

1930 Oklahoma A&M Cowboys football

MVC co-champion
- Conference: Missouri Valley Conference
- Record: 7–2–1 (2–0 MVC)
- Head coach: Pappy Waldorf (2nd season)
- Home stadium: Lewis Field

1930 Missouri Valley Conference football standings
	Conf.					Overall
Team	W		L		T	W		L		T
Drake +	3	–	0	–	0	5	–	4	–	0
Oklahoma A&M +	2	–	0	–	0	7	–	2	–	1
Washington University	2	–	2	–	0	4	–	2	–	2
Grinnell	1	–	2	–	0	5	–	4	–	0
Creighton	0	–	4	–	0	1	–	7	–	0
+ – Conference co-champions

The 1930 Oklahoma A&M Cowboys football team represented Oklahoma A&M College in the 1930 college football season. This was the 30th year of football at A&M and the second under Pappy Waldorf. The Cowboys played their home games at Lewis Field in Stillwater, Oklahoma. They finished the season 7–2–1, 2–0 in the Missouri Valley Conference.

== Schedule ==
Date	Opponent	Site	Result	Attendance	Source
September 26	Wichita*	Lewis Field; Stillwater, OK	W 12–0		
October 4	at Iowa*	Iowa Stadium; Iowa City, IA	W 6–0		
October 11	at Indiana*	Memorial Stadium; Bloomington, IN	T 7–7		
October 18	at Oklahoma City*	Goldbug Field; Oklahoma City, OK	L 0–6		
October 24	Washington University	Lewis Field; Stillwater, OK	W 28–7		
October 31	Haskell*	Lewis Field; Stillwater, OK	L 12–13	8,500	
November 8	at Arkansas*	The Hill; Fayetteville, AR	W 26-0		
November 22	Oklahoma*^{†}	Lewis Field; Stillwater, OK (Bedlam Series)	W 7–0	18,000	
November 27	at Creighton	Creighton Stadium; Omaha, NE	W 13–0		
December 13	at Tulsa*	Skelly Field; Tulsa, OK (rivalry)	W 13–7		
*Non-conference game; ^{†}Homecoming
