= 1930 Loyola Ramblers football team =

American college football season

1930 Loyola Ramblers football
- Conference: Independent
- Record: 2–6–1
- Head coach: Edwin J. Norton (1st season)
- Home stadium: Loyola Stadium

1930 Midwestern college football independents records
| | Conf. | | | Overall |
| Team | W | L | T | W | | L | | T |
|---|---|---|---|---|---|---|---|---|
| No. 1 Notre Dame | | – | | 10 | – | 0 | – | 0 |
| Marquette | | – | | 8 | – | 0 | – | 1 |
| Haskell | | – | | 9 | – | 1 | – | 0 |
| Michigan State | | – | | 5 | – | 1 | – | 2 |
| DePaul | | – | | 4 | – | 2 | – | 1 |
| Detroit | | – | | 5 | – | 3 | – | 2 |
| Kent State | | – | | 3 | – | 3 | – | 1 |
| Saint Louis | | – | | 3 | – | 3 | – | 2 |
| John Carroll | | – | | 3 | – | 5 | – | 2 |
| Loyola (IL) | | – | | 2 | – | 6 | – | 1 |
| Michigan Tech | | – | | 1 | – | 5 | – | 0 |
Rankings from Dickinson System

The 1930 Loyola Ramblers football team was an American football team that represented Loyola University Chicago as an independent during the 1930 college football season. Led by Edwin J. Norton in his only season as head coach, the Ramblers compiled an overall record of 2–6–1. Dr. Norton was hired as head coach after serving for the previous three years as an assistant at Loyola.

In December, university president Rev. Robert M. Kelley announced intercollegiate football at Loyola was to be abandoned and only offered as an intramural sport. This announcement made the 1930 Ramblers season the final one in program history.

== Schedule ==
| Date | Opponent | Site | Result | Attendance | Source |
|---|---|---|---|---|---|
| September 27 | Carroll (WI) | Loyola Stadium; Chicago, IL | W 43–12 | | |
| October 3 | Georgetown | Loyola Stadium; Chicago, IL | L 6–16 | 10,000 | |
| October 10 | Duquesne | Loyola Stadium; Chicago, IL | L 6–7 | | |
| October 17 | at Loyola (LA) | Loyola Stadium; New Orleans, LA | L 0–25 | | |
| October 24 | Coe | Loyola Stadium; Chicago, IL | L 0–12 | | |
| November 2 | vs. DePaul | Soldier Field; Chicago, IL | L 0–6 | | |
| November 7 | at Saint Louis | Edward J. Walsh Memorial Stadium; St. Louis, MO | W 7–6 | 6,500 | |
| November 14 | Boston College | Loyola Stadium; Chicago, IL | L 0–19 | | |
| November 21 | South Dakota State | Loyola Stadium; Chicago, IL | T 7–7 | | |
