= 1930 Missouri Tigers football team =

American college football season

1930 Missouri Tigers football
- Conference: Big Six Conference
- Record: 2–5–2 (1–2–2 Big 6)
- Head coach: Gwinn Henry (8th season)
- Captain: Leonard McGirl
- Home stadium: Memorial Stadium

1930 Big Six Conference football standings
	Conf.					Overall
Team	W		L		T	W		L		T
Kansas $	4	–	1	–	0	6	–	2	–	0
Oklahoma	3	–	1	–	1	4	–	3	–	1
Kansas State	3	–	2	–	0	5	–	3	–	0
Nebraska	2	–	2	–	1	4	–	3	–	2
Missouri	1	–	2	–	2	2	–	5	–	2
Iowa State	0	–	5	–	0	0	–	9	–	0
$ – Conference champion

The 1930 Missouri Tigers football team was an American football team that represented the University of Missouri in the Big Six Conference (Big 6) during the 1930 college football season. The team compiled a 2–5–2 record (1–2–2 against Big 6 opponents), finished in fifth place in the Big 6, and was outscored by a total of 132 to 41. Gwinn Henry was the head coach for the eighth of nine seasons. The team played its home games at Memorial Stadium in Columbia, Missouri.

The team's leading scorer was John Van Dyne with 14 points.

== Schedule ==
Date	Opponent	Site	Result	Attendance	Source
October 4	Colorado*	Memorial Stadium; Columbia, MO	L 0–9	6,000	
October 11	at Saint Louis*	Edward J. Walsh Memorial Stadium; St. Louis, MO	L 0–20	10,000	
October 18	at NYU*	Yankee Stadium; Bronx, NY	L 0–38	27,000	
October 25	Drake*	Memorial Stadium; Columbia, MO	W 14–13		
November 1	at Kansas State	Memorial Stadium; Manhattan, KS	L 13–20		
November 8	Iowa State	Memorial Stadium; Columbia, MO (rivalry)	W 14–0	4,488	
November 15	at Nebraska	Memorial Stadium; Lincoln, NE (rivalry)	T 0–0		
November 22	Kansas	Memorial Stadium; Columbia, MO (rivalry)	L 0–32	24,000	
November 27	at Oklahoma	Memorial Stadium; Norman, OK (rivalry)	T 0–0		
*Non-conference game
