= 1930 Baylor Bears football team =

American college football season

1930 Baylor Bears football
- Conference: Southwest Conference
- Record: 6–3–1 (3–1–1 SWC)
- Head coach: Morley Jennings (5th season)
- Captain: Barton Koch
- Home stadium: Carroll Field

1930 Southwest Conference football standings
	Conf.					Overall
Team	W		L		T	W		L		T
Texas $	4	–	1	–	0	8	–	1	–	1
Baylor	3	–	1	–	1	6	–	3	–	1
TCU	4	–	2	–	0	9	–	2	–	1
SMU	2	–	2	–	1	6	–	3	–	1
Arkansas	2	–	2	–	0	3	–	6	–	0
Rice	2	–	4	–	0	8	–	4	–	0
Texas A&M	0	–	5	–	0	2	–	7	–	0
$ – Conference champion

The 1930 Baylor Bears football team represented Baylor University in the Southwest Conference (SWC) during the 1930 college football season. In their fifth season under head coach Morley Jennings, the Bears compiled a 6–3–1 record (3–1–1 against conference opponents), finished in second place in the conference, and outscored opponents by a combined total of 205 to 80. They played their home games at Carroll Field in Waco, Texas. Barton "Botchey" Koch was the team captain.

== Schedule ==
Date	Opponent	Site	Result	Source
September 27	North Texas State Teachers*	Carroll Field; Waco, TX	W 33–0	
October 4	at Purdue*	Ross–Ade Stadium; West Lafayette, IN	L 7–20	
October 11	Trinity (TX)*	Carroll Field; Waco, TX	W 54–0	
October 18	SMU	Carroll Field; Waco, TX	T 14–14	
October 25	at Centenary*	Fairgrounds Stadium; Shreveport, LA	L 2–7	
November 1	at Oklahoma Baptist*	Shawnee, OK	W 31–0	
November 8	Texas^{†}	Carroll Field; Waco, TX (rivalry)	L 0–14	
November 15	at Arkansas	The Hill; Fayetteville, AR	W 22–7	
November 22	at TCU	Amon G. Carter Stadium; Fort Worth, TX (rivalry)	W 35–14	
November 29	Rice	Carroll Field; Waco, TX	W 7–4	
*Non-conference game; ^{†}Homecoming
