= 1932 Oklahoma City Goldbugs football team =

American college football season

1932 Oklahoma City Goldbugs football
- Conference: Big Four Conference
- Record: 5–5–1 (1–2 Big Four)
- Head coach: Vee Green (4th season)
- Captain: Jimmie Leverich
- Home stadium: Goldbug Field

1932 Big Four Conference (Oklahoma) football standings
	Conf.					Overall
Team	W		L		T	W		L		T
Tulsa $	3	–	0	–	0	7	–	1	–	1
Oklahoma Baptist	2	–	1	–	0	5	–	4	–	0
Oklahoma City	1	–	2	–	0	5	–	5	–	1
Phillips	0	–	3	–	0	3	–	7	–	0
$ – Conference champion

The 1932 Oklahoma City Goldbugs football team represented Oklahoma City University as a member of the Big Four Conference during the 1932 college football season. In Vee Green's fifth and final season as head coach, the Goldbugs compiled an overall record of 5–5–1 with a mark of 1–2 in conference play, placing third in the Big Four. The team's captain was Jimmie Leverich, who played quarterback.

== Schedule ==
Date	Time	Opponent	Site	Result	Attendance	Source
September 15	7:45 p.m.	Maryville (MO)*	Goldbug Field; Oklahoma City, OK	T 0–0	3,500	
September 23	8:00 p.m.	at Jefferson (TX)*	Fair Park Stadium; Dallas, TX	L 12–20	5,000	
September 30	7:45 p.m.	Central State Teachers*	Goldbug Field; Oklahoma City, OK	W 25–7	4,000	
October 7	8:00 p.m.	at Nebraska Wesleyan*	Nebraska Bowl; Lincoln, NE	W 39–13		
October 14		at North Dakota Agricultural*	Dacotah Field; Fargo, ND	L 7–27		
October 21	8:00 p.m.	Oklahoma A&M*^{†}	Goldbug Field; Oklahoma City, OK	L 6–14	7,500	
October 28	8:00 p.m.	McPherson*	Goldbug Field; Oklahoma City, OK	W 47–6		
November 4	7:45 p.m.	at Oklahoma Baptist	Hurt Field; Shawnee, OK	L 6–8		
November 12	2:30 p.m.	Phillips	Goldbug Field; Oklahoma City, OK	W 27–14		
November 18	2:30 p.m.	West Texas State*	Goldbug Field; Oklahoma City, OK	W 19–9		
November 24	2:30 p.m.	Tulsa	Goldbug Field; Oklahoma City, OK	L 0–14	10,000	
*Non-conference game; ^{†}Homecoming; All times are in Central time
