= 1930 Nebraska Cornhuskers football team =

American college football season

1930 Nebraska Cornhuskers football
- Conference: Big Six Conference
- Record: 4–3–2 (2–2–1 Big 6)
- Head coach: Dana X. Bible (2nd season)
- Home stadium: Memorial Stadium

1930 Big Six Conference football standings
	Conf.					Overall
Team	W		L		T	W		L		T
Kansas $	4	–	1	–	0	6	–	2	–	0
Oklahoma	3	–	1	–	1	4	–	3	–	1
Kansas State	3	–	2	–	0	5	–	3	–	0
Nebraska	2	–	2	–	1	4	–	3	–	2
Missouri	1	–	2	–	2	2	–	5	–	2
Iowa State	0	–	5	–	0	0	–	9	–	0
$ – Conference champion

The 1930 Nebraska Cornhuskers football team was an American football team that represented the University of Nebraska in the Big Six Conference during the 1930 college football season. In its second season under head coach Dana X. Bible, the team compiled a 4–3–2 record (2–2–1 against conference opponents), finished fourth in the Big Six, and outscored opponents by a total of 119 to 61. The team played its home games at Memorial Stadium in Lincoln, Nebraska.

== Before the season ==
Nebraska had secured both league titles since the MVIAA had evolved into the Big 6, once under departing coach Bearg and then again under new coach Bible even while adapting to a new playing style. With coach Bible's system now in place, expectations were high to continue holding sole ownership of the Big 6 championship in 1930.

== Schedule ==
Date	Time	Opponent	Site	Result	Attendance	Source
October 4	2:00 p.m.	Texas A&M*	Memorial Stadium; Lincoln, NE	W 13–0	15,000	
October 11	2:00 p.m.	at Oklahoma	Memorial Stadium; Norman, OK (rivalry)	L 7–20		
October 18	2:00 p.m.	at Iowa State	State Field; Ames, IA (rivalry)	W 14–12	5,611	
October 25	2:00 p.m.	Montana State*	Memorial Stadium; Lincoln, NE	W 53–7		
November 1	2:00 p.m.	Pittsburgh*	Memorial Stadium; Lincoln, NE	T 0–0	30,000	
November 8	2:00 p.m.	at Kansas	Memorial Stadium; Lawrence, KS (rivalry)	W 32–0	20,000	
November 15	2:00 p.m.	Missouri^{†}	Memorial Stadium; Lincoln, NE (rivalry)	T 0–0		
November 22	2:00 p.m.	at Iowa*	Iowa Stadium; Iowa City, IA (rivalry)	L 7–12	12,000	
November 27	2:00 p.m.	Kansas State	Memorial Stadium; Lincoln, NE (rivalry)	L 9–10		
*Non-conference game; ^{†}Homecoming; All times are in Central time

== Roster ==
Adam, Jerry #34 G Bokenkroger, William #18 E Broadstone, Marion #46 T Brown, Lewis #26 QB; Byrnes, Charles #65 E Campbell, Clare #41 C Durkee, Bert #37 E Ely, Lawrence #39 C Eno, Gordon #45 T Frahm, Harold #33 HB; Gartner, Ludwig #57 G Greenberg, Elmer #29 G Hokuf, Stephen #48 E Hulbert, Corwin #58 G Jenkins, Rollin #22 T Justice, Charles #56 G Koster, George #35 G Kreizinger, Everett #15 HB; Kroger, Roscoe #36 T Long, Andrew #12 HB; Maasdam, Felber #59 C	Manley, Robert #14 QB; Marrow, Wallace #55 QB; Mathis, Chris #23 QB; McPherson, Forrest #21 C Miller, L.H. #31 G Milne, James #32 E Nelson, Clarence #16 HB; Nesmith, Norris #11 E Packer, Berne #50 FB; Paul, Marvin #19 FB; Penny, Thomas Lee #10 HB; Perry, Art #52 FB; Petersen, Ardean #44 T Prucka, Frank #63 E Rhea, Hugh #53 T Rowley, Claude #17 HB; Staab, Carlyle #24 HB; Stansberry, Robert #38 HB; Swanson, Melvin #54 HB; Young, Robert #25 HB

== Coaching staff ==
Name	Title	First year in this position	Years at Nebraska	Alma mater
Dana X. Bible	Head coach	1929	1929–1936	Carson-Newman
Bill Day	Centers Coach	1928	1921–1925, 1928–1931	Nebraska
Ed Weir		1929	1926, 1929–1937, 1943	Nebraska
Charlie T. Black	Backfield Coach	1926	1926–1930	
Bunny Oakes	Line Coach	1926	1926–1930	
R. G. Lehman		1928	1928–1931	
W. Harold Browne	Freshmen Coach	1930	1930–1940	

== Game summaries ==
=== Texas A&M ===
Texas A&M at Nebraska

Team	1	2	3	4	Total
Texas A&M	0	0	0	0	0
• Nebraska	0	0	7	6	13

- Date: October 4
- Location: Memorial Stadium • Lincoln, Nebraska

Nebraska met Texas A&M for the first time, in Lincoln, to open the 1930 schedule. Neither team was able to impress greatly in the first half, though the Aggies did pull within three yards of the Nebraska end zone at the end of the half, failing in two attempts to score before the break. The Cornhuskers punched in a third-quarter touchdown to finally get rolling, and pulled the starters out of the game after another touchdown in the fourth. Even against the backups, Texas A&M was unable to get on the scoreboard.

=== Oklahoma ===
Nebraska at Oklahoma

Team	1	2	3	4	Total
Nebraska	0	0	0	7	7
• Oklahoma	7	7	6	0	20

- Date: October 11
- Location: Oklahoma Memorial Stadium • Norman, Oklahoma

Nebraska opened conference play in Norman by facing a Sooner team that had succeeded in putting away the Cornhuskers only once in all nine of their attempts. Events looked to repeat at first, but a 15-yard penalty in the first quarter deflated Nebraska's momentum and the team never quite recovered. By the time the Cornhuskers found the personnel and the schemes to get some points it was the fourth quarter and too late to catch up. Hopes for a league title were severely dampened by the 0–1 conference start, but Nebraska still owned the series at 6–2–2.

=== Iowa State ===
Nebraska at Iowa State

Team	1	2	3	4	Total
• Nebraska	7	7	0	0	14
Iowa State	0	0	6	6	12

- Date: October 18
- Location: Clyde Williams Field • Ames, Iowa
- Game attendance: 5,611

Nebraska came out strong and jumped to an early lead, padding a second touchdown on to hold a comfortable 14–0 lead by halftime. The Cyclones were undaunted and managed to shut down further scoring by Nebraska while putting up a couple touchdowns of their own to catch up, though both kicks after failed. Down by two points, Iowa State was driving and had all the momentum after a 55-yard pass put them close to scoring when they were subsequently intercepted at the Nebraska 3-yard line and the game was decided. Iowa State was losing sight of the series now, lagging behind the Cornhuskers 4–20–1.

=== Montana State ===
Montana State at Nebraska

Team	1	2	Total
Montana State			7
• Nebraska			53

- Date: October 25
- Location: Memorial Stadium • Lincoln, Nebraska

Nebraska's second meeting with the Bobcats of Montana State did not start well, as the Bobcats struck first and had the Cornhuskers down 7–0 at the end of the first quarter, seemingly ready to avenge their 6–26 loss from 1928. It was not to be their day, however, as Nebraska unleashed a scoring onslaught of 53 unanswered points to entirely humble the visiting team. Nebraska's scoring total was the highest since a 58–0 blanking of Grinnell in 1927. Montana State and Nebraska never again met on the football field, leaving the Bobcats winless in their two attempts against the Cornhuskers.

=== Pittsburgh ===
Pittsburgh at Nebraska

Team	1	2	3	4	Total
Pittsburgh	0	0	0	0	0
Nebraska	0	0	0	0	0

- Date: November 1
- Location: Memorial Stadium • Lincoln, Nebraska

Nebraska brought a history of pent up frustration to the field when Pittsburgh arrived in Lincoln, as the Cornhuskers owned only one victory against the Panthers in four tries, the single win from their first meeting in 1921. The task would be tall this year as well, as Pitt stood as the reigning east champions and had lost only to Notre Dame so far in 1930. The battle was evenly matched through the first half, but Pitt began to find the edge afterwards. The Cornhuskers mounted an excellent defensive stand and twice turned the Panthers back from inside the Nebraska 5-yard line in the third quarter before the Cornhuskers regained some better defensive control and fought Pitt to a scoreless standoff until time ran out. The record still stood slightly in Pittsburgh's favor, at 2–1–2.

=== Kansas ===
Nebraska at Kansas

Team	1	2	3	4	Total
• Nebraska	7	6	0	3	16
Kansas	0	0	0	0	0

- Date: November 8
- Location: Memorial Stadium • Lawrence, Kansas

Kansas was unbeaten in conference play and gaming for the 1930 league title when Nebraska arrived, looking as beatable as it could be in recent memory. Once the game started though, Kansas was frustrated at every turn, unable to get much accomplished except for one big 50-yard pass play in a drive that ultimately reached the Nebraska 10 before the Cornhuskers repelled the threat. Nebraska was up by 13 at the half and capped the effort with a fourth-quarter field goal to shut out the Jayhawks in what would be their only conference loss. Kansas went on to claim the league title despite the blanking handed to them by the Cornhuskers, who improved to 26–9–2 over the Jayhawks.

=== Missouri ===
Missouri at Nebraska

Team	1	2	3	4	Total
Missouri	0	0	0	0	0
Nebraska	0	0	0	0	0

- Date: November 15
- Location: Memorial Stadium • Lincoln, Nebraska
- Game weather: Light rain

Missouri was still sore over last year's tie that denied them custody of the Missouri-Nebraska Bell, and came to Lincoln to get it back. Both teams fought to a virtual standstill for the entire game, neither team ever getting beyond the opposite 10-yard line before being turned away. Blocked punts, incompletions, fumbles and other miscues contributed to the scoreless affair. Yet again, Missouri was denied taking home the Bell, and had much ground to cover if they hoped to chip away at their 6–15–3 record against the Cornhuskers.

=== Iowa ===
Nebraska at Iowa

Team	1	2	3	4	Total
Nebraska	7	0	0	0	7
• Iowa	0	12	0	0	12

- Date: November 22
- Location: Iowa Stadium • Iowa City, Iowa

The Cornhuskers were visibly lacking spirit when they met old rival Iowa for the first time in ten years, yet still managed to score first and keep the 7–0 lead at the end of the first quarter. The lack of spark hampered Nebraska going forward from there, as Iowa managed to respond with 12 straight before the break. A weak rally by the Cornhuskers in the final quarter was their last chance to extract the win, starting with a first down on the Iowa 5-yard line, but came away empty handed and were sent home on the losing end of the score. Iowa drew up to within five games of Nebraska overall, bringing the series to 7–12–3.

=== Kansas State ===
Kansas State at Nebraska

Team	1	2	Total
• Kansas State			10
Nebraska			9

- Date: November 27
- Location: Memorial Stadium • Lincoln, Nebraska

After two disappointing games, the Cornhusker squad could at least look to close the season with a win against Kansas State with some confidence, as Nebraska had never lost a game to the Aggies. But the Cornhuskers came out flat in the first half, and the single Kansas State field goal was enough for the lead by halftime. Nebraska came back in the third quarter to take the lead with a touchdown, only to be soon answered by the Aggies with their own touchdown. Nebraska had a chance to put the pressure on Kansas State, but the Aggies willingly allowed Nebraska to score the safety instead of taking over on downs or turnover, and thereby held a one-point lead when kicking back off to Nebraska as the game waned. The final Cornhusker attempt to pull out a win was snuffed by an interception, and Kansas State ended Nebraska's season by winning against them for the first time in 15 attempts, adding insult to injury by pulling off the defeat in Lincoln. This game marked just the 10th Nebraska conference defeat since the 1907 formation of the Missouri Valley Intercollegiate Athletic Association.

== After the season ==
After taking the league title in his first season, coach Bible's 1930 squad took a harsh turn for the worse, ending the season with a painful 4–3–2 (.556) record, the worst since the abbreviated and stunted 1918 season, and the post-war, post-pandemic recovery season of the following year. Still, overall it was a winning season, though it brought coach Bible's career record down to 8–4–5 (.618). The program's overall record fell to 228–78–25 (.727) while Nebraska's Big 6 record fell severely, to 59–10–8 (.818). Even though all records took a significant hit relative to Nebraska's typical performance, the Cornhuskers clearly still held winning percentages well above average and envied by programs nationwide.
