= Albert Sharpe (American football) =

American football player and athletic director (1877–1966)

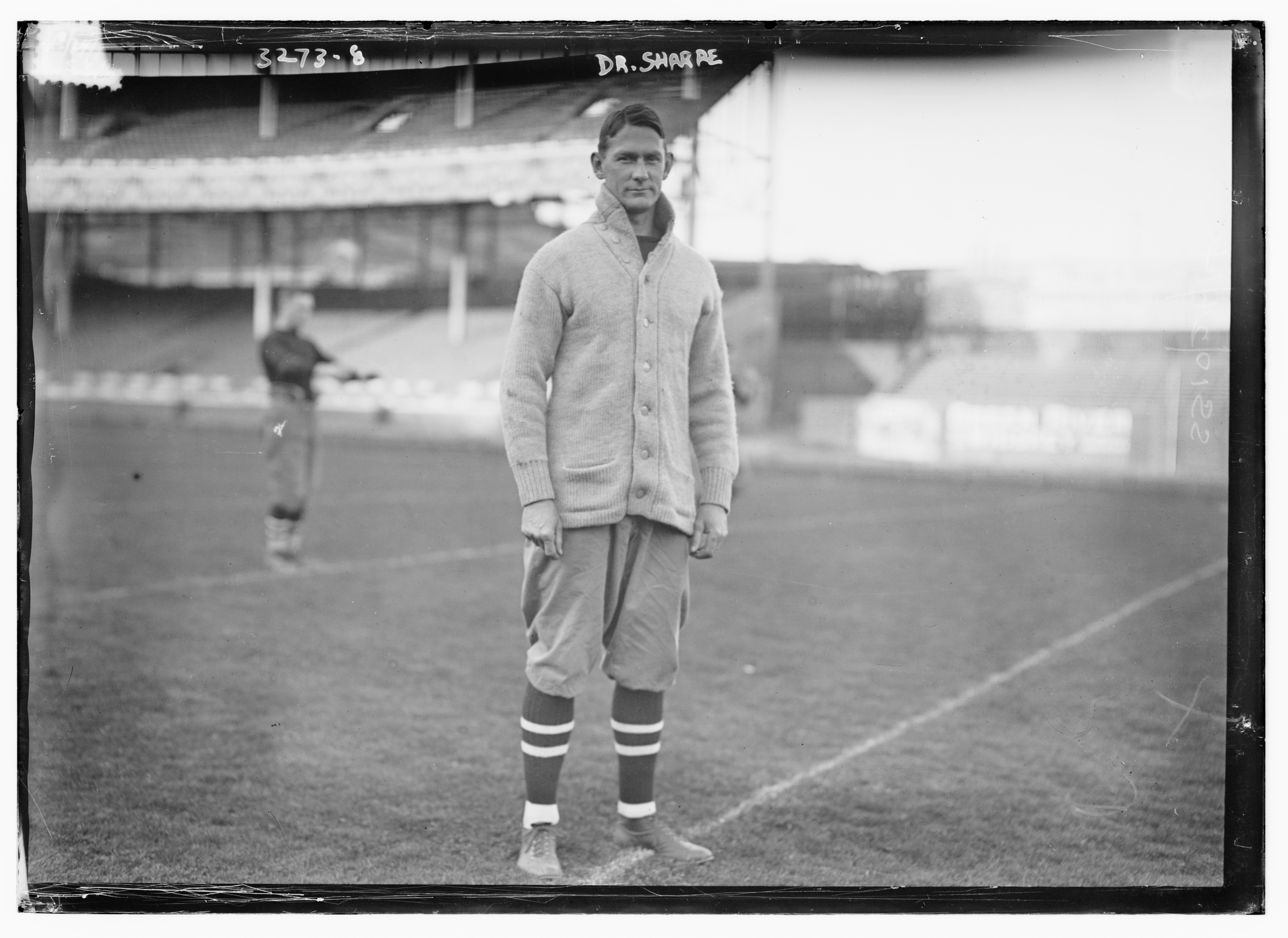
- Sharpe in 1914

Biographical details
- Born: October 7, 1877
- Died: May 17, 1966 (aged 88); Buffalo, New York, U.S.

Playing career

Football
- 1897–1900: Yale

Baseball
- 1900–1901: Yale
- Position: Halfback

Coaching career (HC unless noted)

Football
- 1912–1917: Cornell
- 1919: Yale
- 1928–1931: Washington University

Basketball
- 1912–1919: Cornell
- 1919–1921: Yale

Baseball
- 1913–1919: Cornell

Administrative career (AD unless noted)
- 1919–1921: Yale
- 1928–?: Washington University

Head coaching record
- Overall: 50–42–5 (football); 103–58 (basketball); 60–65–1 (baseball)

Accomplishments and honors

Championships
- As coach: National (1915); As player: National (1900)

Awards
- Consensus All-American (1899); Third-team All-American (1900)

Albert Hayes Sharpe (October 7, 1877 – May 17, 1966) was an All-American football player, coach and athletic director and medical doctor. He played football for Yale University and was selected as a halfback for the 1899 College Football All-America Team. Sharpe was also a star basketball player in the early years of the college game. Sharpe also excelled in baseball, gymnastics, rowing and track. In 1915, Sharpe was selected by one sporting expert as the greatest living athlete in the United States. He later served as a coach and administrator at Cornell University, Yale, the Ithaca School of Physical Education and Washington University in St. Louis.

== Athlete at Yale ==
=== Football ===
Sharpe began his athletic career as a student at the William Penn Charter School in Philadelphia. After graduating from the Penn School, Sharpe enrolled at Yale University, where he played halfback for the Yale football team from 1898 to 1900. He also handled punting and place-kicking responsibilities for the team. In 1899, he was selected as an All-American in football. On the gridiron, Sharpe's "end running and kicking thrilled Yale students." In 1929, sports writer Lawrence Perry wrote that Sharpe was best recalled for a 50-yard dropkick in the 1899 Yale-Princeton game. In an October 1900 game against Amherst, Sharpe had one of his best games. A contemporary newspaper account reported: "Sharpe was again the sensational hero of the game. He got Yale's first touchdown by a series of three runs that carried the ball for 85 yards. He got Yale's second touchdown when the first half was almost ended by a 95-yard run that set the grand stand wild."

=== Basketball pioneer ===
Sharpe was also a pioneer of college basketball. Intercollegiate basketball did not gain traction until the 1900s, but Yale students organized a team in the 1890s. In February 1898, Sharpe led Yale's basketball team to a 27–7 win over New York's Knickerbocker Athletic Club. A newspaper account of the game praised Yale for its "signal work" in passing the ball from one to another without a hitch. Sharpe led all scorers with five goals including a halfcourt shot described as follows:

"In the second half Sharp wound up the good work of his team by throwing a goal from the centre of the field on a backward pass from Lockwood. The ball sailed through the air and landed in the basket without touching anything. This was an unusual feat."

In January and February 1899, Sharpe played left forward and center on a Yale basketball team that played games against teams from the New Britain Athletic Club, the Fourth Separate Company of Yonkers, and Trinity College. In December 1899, Sharpe was elected captain of the Yale basketball team. On the day after Christmas 1899, Sharpe led the Yale basketball team on a road trip for a series of seven games against teams from the Midwest, including the Western University of Pennsylvania, Ohio State, a team made up from the Wisconsin Second Regiment of Fond du Lac, Wisconsin. After returning from the Western trip, Sharpe led Yale to a 30–10 victory over the Dreadnought Athletic Club—a New York team considered one of the best in basketball at the time.

=== All round athlete ===
Sharpe also excelled in other sports. He was referred to in 1919 as "the best all around athlete Yale has produced, having won his varsity letter when at Yale, in three branches of sport—football, baseball and crew." In addition to football and basketball, Sharpe was also a fine baseball player and a skilled gymnast. In 1900, The New York Times noted that "Sharpe of Yale is as good a first baseman as he is a halfback, which is saying a good deal." In 1915, Dr. A.C. May, a noted athletic trainer, rated Sharpe as "the greatest living all round athlete today." May supported his selection as follows:

"Look at him once and you will see the reason for his success. He is 6 feet, 1 inch tall and weights 196 pounds. He is evenly proportioned and owes his build, not to athletics, but in gymnastics, and he owed his athletic success not to his build so much as his ability to handle his body, which he developed in the gymnasium. He can handle himself on the bars and rings and other apparatus with as much skill as he can play football or other sports. He can turn a backward and forward flip and he knows the other tricks of a gymnast. ... Sharpe could row, run a fine relay, jump, put the shot, and, in fact, do about anything on the athletic field."

After completing his undergraduate studies, Sharpe attended Yale Medical School and became a medical doctor.

== Athletic coach, administrator and official ==
In 1901, Sharpe accepted a position as the director of physical education at the William Penn Charter School. He remained at the William Penn school for nine years.

During his time at William Penn, Sharpe remained active in college football, serving as an official at important college football games, including the Army–Navy Games. Sharpe also spoke out about various proposals to reform or change the rules of football. He was quoted as saying that young men in the United States needed football, because it was "the only game in which a gentleman can fight." While defending the game, Sharpe conceded that some rule changes were appropriate: "Slight changes will be made in the rules by us, fully believing that the accidents this year were due to coincidence rather than to any unnecessary roughness in the game."

Sharpe also advocated relaxation on the rule against professionalism. In 1905, amid calls to rid college athletics of professionalism, Sharpe spoke in favor of allowing college baseball players to play summer baseball to earn some money. He proposed that "scholarship, not professionalism, should be the basis of eligibility tests."

=== Cornell ===
In February 1912, Sharpe was hired by Cornell University where he served as the coach of the football, basketball and baseball teams. In 1915, he coached the first Cornell football team that ranked at the top of the Eastern schools. At the end of the 1915 season, sports writer Frank G. Menke offered Sharpe (along with Amos Alonzo Stagg, Glenn Warner and Percy Haughton) as one of the coaches deserving of consideration as the All-American coach. Menke wrote:

"Al Sharpe at Cornell started the season with only one real star from his 1914 eleven -- Charles Barrett, the amazing quarterback. But Sharpe wasn't discouraged. He took the material that offered and built it around Barrett. He tinkered with that machine; he worked at it unceasingly. As a result, he has given to Cornell the greatest team it has had in a decade; a team that beat Harvard decisively; a team that has swept along, unbeaten, toward the championship goal."

Sharpe's six-year record as football coach at Cornell was 34–21–1. His best seasons at Cornell were the three years from 1914 to 1916, when the Big Red football teams were 23–4 and outscored opponents 709 to 177.

=== Yale ===
In 1919, Sharpe returned to Yale as athletic director and football coach. Sharpe had built a reputation at Cornell as one of the country's best athletic coaches. The Washington Post reported on Sharpe's hiring as follows:

"Yale undergraduates and alumni welcome the news that Dr. Albert Sharpe, long athletic coach at Cornell, will return to his alma mater after an absence of sixteen years. Sharpe has made a reputation since he became the dominant figure in Cornell athletics as the greatest all round coach in the country. ... Sharpe's appointment is in keeping with the new athletic .policy of the colleges and universities of the country. As the active director of major sports, he in reality will be a member of the faculty. Instead of being a seasonal coach he will be at New Haven the year round."

After a disappointing 5–3 performance by the Yale football team in 1919, Sharpe was replaced as Yale's football coach by Tad Jones. Sharpe remained the athletic director until 1921.

=== Ithaca College ===
In March 1921, Sharpe announced that he would resign as Yale's athletic director when his contract expired in June. After leaving Yale, Sharpe founded and served as the president of the Ithaca School of Physical Education, later part as Ithaca College. Sharpe remained at the Ithaca School of Physical Education from 1921 to 1927. While at the Ithaca school, Sharpe also developed a reputation as one of the leading football and basketball officials in the East.

=== Washington University in St. Louis ===
In 1928, Sharpe became the athletic director and head football coach at Washington University in St. Louis. When he was hired at Washington University, sports writer Lawrence Perry wrote: "No athletic director and coach coulc by any possibility have more friends pulling for him than this former Yale backfield star whose character is so outstanding that no young men ever came in contact with him without being better for it." In four years as head football coach (1928–1931), Sharpe's teams compiled a disappointing record of 11–18–4. In 1932, Pro Football Hall of Fame inductee Jimmy Conzelman replaced Sharpe as football coach, but Sharpe stayed on as the university's athletic director.

== Later years ==
In the 1930s, Sharpe was also the president of the Touchdown Club, an organization of former football players, and an executive with the Red Cross. Sharpe lived in East Aurora, New York in his later years. He died at Buffalo General Hospital in 1966 at age 88.

== Head coaching record ==
Year	Team	Overall	Conference	Standing	Bowl/playoffs
Cornell Big Red (Independent) (1912–1917)
1912	Cornell	3–7			
1913	Cornell	5–4–1			
1914	Cornell	8–2			
1915	Cornell	9–0			
1916	Cornell	6–2			
1917	Cornell	3–6			
Cornell:		34–21–1			
Yale Bulldogs (Independent) (1919)
1919	Yale	5–3			
Yale:		5–3			
Washington University Bears (Missouri Valley Conference) (1928–1931)
1928	Washington University	2–5–1	0–2	5th	
1929	Washington University	3–4–1	0–1–1	4th	
1930	Washington University	4–2–2	2–2	3rd	
1931	Washington University	2–7	0–3	5th	
Washington University:		11–18–4	2–8–1		
Total:		50–42–5			
National championship Conference title Conference division title or championship game berth
