= 1930 Washington University Bears football team =

American college football season

1930 Washington University Bears football
- Conference: Missouri Valley Conference
- Record: 4–2–2 (2–2 MVC)
- Head coach: Albert Sharpe (3rd season)
- Home stadium: Francis Field

1930 Missouri Valley Conference football standings
	Conf.					Overall
Team	W		L		T	W		L		T
Drake +	3	–	0	–	0	5	–	4	–	0
Oklahoma A&M +	2	–	0	–	0	7	–	2	–	1
Washington University	2	–	2	–	0	4	–	2	–	2
Grinnell	1	–	2	–	0	5	–	4	–	0
Creighton	0	–	4	–	0	1	–	7	–	0
+ – Conference co-champions

The 1930 Washington University Bears football team represented Washington University in St. Louis as a member of the Missouri Valley Conference (MVC) during the 1930 college football season. In its third season under head coach Albert Sharpe, the team compiled a 4–2–2 record, finished third in the MVC, and outscored opponents by a total of 88 to 47. The team played its home games at Francis Field in St. Louis.

== Schedule ==
Date	Opponent	Site	Result	Attendance	Source
October 3	Illinois College*	Francis Field; St. Louis, MO	W 41–0		
October 11	William Jewell*	Francis Field; St. Louis, MO	T 0–0	5,500	
October 18	Westminster (MO)*	Francis Field; St. Louis, MO	W 14–0		
October 25	at Oklahoma A&M	Lewis Field; Stillwater, OK	L 7–28		
November 1	at Drake	Drake Stadium; Des Moines, IA	L 0–12		
November 8	Grinnell	Francis Field; St. Louis, MO	W 6–0		
November 15	Creighton	Francis Field; St. Louis, MO	W 13–0		
November 27	Saint Louis*	Francis Field; St. Louis, MO	T 7–7	15,381	
*Non-conference game
