= 1929 Tulsa Golden Hurricane football team =

American college football season

1929 Tulsa Golden Hurricane football

Big Four champion
- Conference: Big Four Conference
- Record: 6–3–1 (4–0–1 Big Four)
- Head coach: Gus Henderson (5th season)
- Home stadium: McNulty Park

1929 Big Four Conference (Oklahoma) football standings
	Conf.					Overall
Team	W		L		T	W		L		T
Tulsa $	4	–	0	–	1	6	–	3	–	1
Oklahoma Baptist	2	–	3	–	0	5	–	3	–	0
Oklahoma City	2	–	3	–	0	5	–	5	–	0
Phillips	1	–	3	–	1	4	–	4	–	3
$ – Conference champion

The 1929 Tulsa Golden Hurricane football team represented the University of Tulsa during the 1929 college football season. In their fifth year under head coach Gus Henderson, the Golden Hurricane compiled a 6–3–1 record, won the Big Four Conference championship, and outscored their opponents by a total of 107 to 81.

== Schedule ==
Date	Opponent	Site	Result	Attendance	Source
September 28	at Wichita*	Wichita, KS	W 19–0		
October 5	Phillips	McNulty Park; Tulsa, OK	W 14–0		
October 12	at Detroit*	University of Detroit Stadium; Detroit, MI	L 6–21		
October 19	Oklahoma City	McNulty Park; Tulsa, OK	W 15–0		
October 26	at Phillips	Enid, OK	T 7–7		
November 2	at Oklahoma A&M*	Lewis Field; Stillwater, OK (rivalry)	L 0–20		
November 9	Oklahoma Baptist^{†}	McNulty Park; Tulsa, OK	W 7–3		
November 16	Washburn*	McNulty Park; Tulsa, OK	W 19–7		
November 28	Oklahoma City	W. League Park; Tulsa, OK	W 6–3		
December 7	Haskell*	McNulty Park; Tulsa, OK	L 14–20	5,000	
*Non-conference game; ^{†}Homecoming
