= 1930 TCU Horned Frogs football team =

American college football season

1930 TCU Horned Frogs football
- Conference: Southwest Conference
- Record: 9–2–1 (4–2 SWC)
- Head coach: Francis Schmidt (2nd season)
- Home stadium: Clark Field; Amon G. Carter Stadium

1930 Southwest Conference football standings
	Conf.					Overall
Team	W		L		T	W		L		T
Texas $	4	–	1	–	0	8	–	1	–	1
Baylor	3	–	1	–	1	6	–	3	–	1
TCU	4	–	2	–	0	9	–	2	–	1
SMU	2	–	2	–	1	6	–	3	–	1
Arkansas	2	–	2	–	0	3	–	6	–	0
Rice	2	–	4	–	0	8	–	4	–	0
Texas A&M	0	–	5	–	0	2	–	7	–	0
$ – Conference champion

The 1930 TCU Horned Frogs football team represented Texas Christian University (TCU) as a member the Southwest Conference (SWC) during the 1930 college football season. Led by second-year head coach Francis Schmidt, the Horned Frogs compiled and overall record of 9–2–1 overall with a mark of 4–2 in conference play, placing third. TCU hosted their first two home game as Clark Field, before moving to the newly constructed Amon G. Carter Stadium for their game with Arkansas on October 11.

== Schedule ==
Date	Time	Opponent	Site	Result	Attendance	Source
September 19		at North Texas State Teachers*	Eagle Field; Denton, TX	W 47–0		
September 20		East Texas State*	Clark Field; Fort Worth, TX	W 40–0		
September 27		Austin*	Clark Field; Fort Worth, TX	W 33–7		
October 4	2:30 p.m.	vs. Simmons*	Buckaroo Field; Breckenridge, TX	T 0–0		
October 11		Arkansas	Amon G. Carter Stadium; Fort Worth, TX	W 40–0	10,000	
October 18		at Texas A&M	Kyle Field; College Station, TX (rivalry)	W 3–0		
October 25		Texas Tech*	Amon G. Carter Stadium; Fort Worth, TX (rivalry)	W 26–0	4,000	
November 1		Abilene Christian*	Amon G. Carter Stadium; Fort Worth, TX	W 62–0		
November 8		at Rice	Rice Field; Houston, TX	W 20–0		
November 15		Texas	Amon G. Carter Stadium; Fort Worth, TX (rivalry)	L 0–7		
November 22		Baylor	Amon G. Carter Stadium; Fort Worth, TX (rivalry)	L 14–35		
November 29		at SMU	Ownby Stadium; University Park, TX (rivalry)	W 13–0		
*Non-conference game; All times are in Central time
