= Big Four Conference (Oklahoma) =

The Big Four Conference was an intercollegiate athletic conference that existed from 1929 to 1932. Its membership was centered on the state of Oklahoma.

== Former members ==
Institution	Location	Founded	Nickname	Current conference
Oklahoma Baptist University	Shawnee, Oklahoma	1910	Bison	Great American (NCAA D-II)
Oklahoma City University	Oklahoma City, Oklahoma	1904	Goldbugs (Note: Oklahoma City was known as the Goldbugs at the time.)	Sooner (NAIA)
Phillips University	Enid, Oklahoma	1906	Haymakers	Closed in 1998
University of Tulsa	Tulsa, Oklahoma	1894	Tulsa Golden Hurricane	American Athletic (NCAA D-I)

== Football champions ==
		Record		
Year	Champions	Conference	Overall	Head coach
1929	Tulsa	4–0–1	6–3–1	Gus Henderson
1930	Tulsa	3–0	7–2	Gus Henderson
1931	Oklahoma City	3–0	12–0	Vee Green
1932	Tulsa	3–0	7–1–1	Gus Henderson

== Yearly football standings ==
1929 Big Four Conference (Oklahoma) football standings
	Conf.					Overall
Team	W		L		T	W		L		T
Tulsa $	4	–	0	–	1	6	–	3	–	1
Oklahoma Baptist	2	–	3	–	0	5	–	3	–	0
Oklahoma City	2	–	3	–	0	5	–	5	–	0
Phillips	1	–	3	–	1	4	–	4	–	3
$ – Conference champion

1930 Big Four Conference (Oklahoma) football standings
	Conf.					Overall
Team	W		L		T	W		L		T
Tulsa $	3	–	0	–	0	7	–	2	–	0
Oklahoma City	2	–	1	–	0	9	–	1	–	0
Phillips	1	–	2	–	0	6	–	3	–	0
Oklahoma Baptist	0	–	3	–	0	4	–	5	–	0
$ – Conference champion

1931 Big Four Conference (Oklahoma) football standings
	Conf.					Overall
Team	W		L		T	W		L		T
Oklahoma City $	3	–	0	–	0	12	–	0	–	0
Tulsa	2	–	1	–	0	8	–	3	–	0
Oklahoma Baptist	1	–	2	–	0	3	–	6	–	0
Phillips	0	–	3	–	0	1	–	5	–	0
$ – Conference champion

1932 Big Four Conference (Oklahoma) football standings
	Conf.					Overall
Team	W		L		T	W		L		T
Tulsa $	3	–	0	–	0	7	–	1	–	1
Oklahoma Baptist	2	–	1	–	0	5	–	4	–	0
Oklahoma City	1	–	2	–	0	5	–	5	–	1
Phillips	0	–	3	–	0	3	–	7	–	0
$ – Conference champion

== See also ==
- List of defunct college football conferences
