= 1930 Haskell Indians football team =

American college football season

1930 Haskell Indians football
- Conference: Independent
- Record: 9–1
- Head coach: William Henry Dietz (2nd season)
- Captain: Louis Weller
- Home stadium: Haskell Stadium

1930 Midwestern college football independents records
	Conf.			Overall
Team	W	L	T	W		L		T
No. 1 Notre Dame		–		10	–	0	–	0
Marquette		–		8	–	0	–	1
Haskell		–		9	–	1	–	0
Michigan State		–		5	–	1	–	2
DePaul		–		4	–	2	–	1
Detroit		–		5	–	3	–	2
Kent State		–		3	–	3	–	1
Saint Louis		–		3	–	3	–	2
John Carroll		–		3	–	5	–	2
Loyola (IL)		–		2	–	6	–	1
Michigan Tech		–		1	–	5	–	0
Rankings from Dickinson System

The 1930 Haskell Indians football team was an American football that represented the Haskell Institute (now known as Haskell Indian Nations University) during the 1930 college football season. In its second year under head coach William Henry Dietz, the team compiled a 9–1 record. Louis Weller was the team captain.

== Schedule ==
Date	Opponent	Site	Result	Attendance	Source
September 26	at Washburn	Moore Bowl; Topeka, KS	W 27–14		
October 10	at Kansas	Memorial Stadium; Lawrence, KS	L 7–33	15,000	
October 17	at Wichita	Wichita, KS	W 38–6		
October 25	at Creighton	Creighton Stadium; Omaha, NE	W 19–12		
October 31	at Oklahoma A&M	Lewis Field; Stillwater, OK	W 13–12	8,500	
November 11	at Gonzaga	Gonzaga Stadium; Spokane, WA	W 19–7		
November 15	at Idaho Southern Branch	Pocatello, ID	W 43–0	1,500	
November 22	at Butler	Butler Bowl; Indianapolis, IN	W 27–0		
November 27	at Xavier	Corcoran Field; Cincinnati, OH	W 33–7	8,000	
December 6	at Tulsa	Skelly Field; Tulsa, OK	W 34–7		
