= Bert Metzger =

American football player (1909–1986)

Profile
- Position: Guard

Personal information
- Born: January 31, 1909; Chicago, Illinois, U.S.
- Died: March 7, 1986 (aged 77); Hinsdale, Illinois, U.S.
- Listed height: 5 ft 9 in (1.75 m)
- Listed weight: 155 lb (70 kg)

Career information
- High school: Loyola Academy (IL)
- College: Notre Dame (1928–1930)

Awards and highlights
- 2× National champion (1929, 1930); First-team All-American (1930)
- College Football Hall of Fame (Class of 1982)

Bertram L. Metzger (Note: Some online sources list Metzger's middle name as Leo; however, his Draft Registration Card of October 1940 listed "Bertram L. Metzger" as his full name.) (January 31, 1909 – March 7, 1986) was an American gridiron football player, best known for playing college football for the University of Notre Dame at the end of the 1920s. He was inducted to the College Football Hall of Fame in 1982.

== Biography ==
Metzger was born in Chicago in 1909 an attended Loyola Academy in nearby Wilmette, Illinois. For the 1925 season, Metzger was named a first-team all-star of the Chicago Catholic League, Loyola's high school athletic conference.

Metzger went on to play guard for the Notre Dame Fighting Irish football teams of 1928–1930, the latter two of which were recognized as national champions. Only 5 feet 9 inches (175 cm) and 155 pounds (70 kg), (Note: Metzger's listed college playing weight varies somewhat by source; 155 pounds is per the College Football Hall of Fame.) Metzger was sometimes referred to as a "watch-charm guard" (Note: A watch charm is "a small ornament designed to dangle from a watch chain.") because of his relatively small size. (Note: The "watch-charm" descriptor was used for small guards at Notre Dame as far back as the 1923 season.) He was named to the 1930 College Football All-America Team by some selectors. Remarking on the final game of his college career, a 27–0 Notre Dame win over USC in December 1930, the United Press wrote, "Metzger seemed to be in on every play. His vicious tackling, hard charging and perfect blocking featured in almost every play." Coach Knute Rockne said Metzger was the best guard he had ever seen.

Metzger was a 1931 graduate at Notre Dame. He then worked at Bowman-Dean Foods for 43 years; starting as a milkman, he became a company executive. He was inducted into the College Football Hall of Fame in 1982. He is also an inductee of the athletic hall of fame at Loyola Academy.

In the summer of 1931, Metzger's engagement to Marian E. Masterson of Chicago was announced, with a spring 1932 wedding. The couple had two sons; (Note: One son was known as Bert Jr.) Marian died in June 1965. Metzger died in 1986 at the age of 77; he was survived by his second wife, Dorothy, and four children.
