= 1930 Detroit Titans football team =

American college football season

1930 Detroit Titans football
- Conference: Independent
- Record: 5–3–2
- Head coach: Gus Dorais (6th season)
- Home stadium: University of Detroit Stadium

1930 Midwestern college football independents records
	Conf.			Overall
Team	W	L	T	W		L		T
No. 1 Notre Dame		–		10	–	0	–	0
Marquette		–		8	–	0	–	1
Haskell		–		9	–	1	–	0
Michigan State		–		5	–	1	–	2
DePaul		–		4	–	2	–	1
Detroit		–		5	–	3	–	2
Kent State		–		3	–	3	–	1
Saint Louis		–		3	–	3	–	2
John Carroll		–		3	–	5	–	2
Loyola (IL)		–		2	–	6	–	1
Michigan Tech		–		1	–	5	–	0
Rankings from Dickinson System

The 1930 Detroit Titans football team represented the University of Detroit in the 1930 college football season. Detroit outscored opponents by a combined total of 208 to 35 and finished with a 5–3–2 record in their sixth year under head coach and College Football Hall of Fame inductee, Gus Dorais. Significant games included a victory over West Virginia (23–0), a scoreless tie with Michigan State (0–0), and a loss to Iowa (3–7).

== Schedule ==
Date	Opponent	Site	Result	Attendance	Source
September 26	Adrian	University of Detroit Stadium; Detroit, MI	W 59–0	> 11,000	
October 3	Albion	University of Detroit Stadium; Detroit, MI	W 51–0	> 14,000	
October 10	Grinnell	University of Detroit Stadium; Detroit, MI	W 47–6		
October 17	West Virginia	University of Detroit Stadium; Detroit, MI	W 23–0	20,000	
November 1	Iowa	University of Detroit Stadium; Detroit, MI	L 3–7		
November 8	Fordham	University of Detroit Stadium; Detroit, MI	L 7–13		
November 15	at Marquette	Marquette Stadium; Milwaukee, WI	T 0–0	23,000	
November 22	at Michigan State	College Field; East Lansing, MI	T 0–0	> 20,000	
November 29	Georgetown	University of Detroit Stadium; Detroit, MI	W 12–0		
December 6	at Loyola (LA)	Loyola University Stadium; New Orleans, LA	L 6–9		
