= 1930 Texas A&M Aggies football team =

American college football season

1930 Texas A&M Aggies football
- Conference: Southwest Conference
- Record: 2–7 (0–5 SWC)
- Head coach: Matty Bell (2nd season)
- Home stadium: Kyle Field

1930 Southwest Conference football standings
	Conf.					Overall
Team	W		L		T	W		L		T
Texas $	4	–	1	–	0	8	–	1	–	1
Baylor	3	–	1	–	1	6	–	3	–	1
TCU	4	–	2	–	0	9	–	2	–	1
SMU	2	–	2	–	1	6	–	3	–	1
Arkansas	2	–	2	–	0	3	–	6	–	0
Rice	2	–	4	–	0	8	–	4	–	0
Texas A&M	0	–	5	–	0	2	–	7	–	0
$ – Conference champion

The 1930 Texas A&M Aggies football team represented the Agricultural and Mechanical College of Texas—now known as Texas A&M University—as a member the Southwest Conference (SWC) during the 1930 college football season. Led by second-year head coach Matty Bell, the Aggies compiled and overall record of 2–7, with a mark of 0–5 in conference play, placing last in the SWC.

== Schedule ==
Date	Opponent	Site	Result	Source
September 27	Southwestern (TX)*	Kyle Field; College Station, TX	W 43–0	
October 4	at Nebraska*	Memorial Stadium; Lincoln, NE	L 0–13	
October 11	vs. Tulane*	Fair Park; Dallas, TX	L 9–19	
October 18	at Arkansas	Kavanaugh Field; Little Rock, AR (rivalry)	L 0–13	
October 25	TCU	Kyle Field; College Station, TX (rivalry)	L 0–3	
November 1	Centenary*	Kyle Field; College Station, TX	W 7–6	
November 8	at SMU	Ownby Stadium; University Park, TX	L 7–13	
November 15	Rice	Kyle Field; College Station, TX	L 0–7	
November 27	at Texas	War Memorial Stadium; Austin, TX (rivalry)	L 0–26	
*Non-conference game
