= 1930 Creighton Bluejays football team =

American college football season

1930 Creighton Bluejays football
- Conference: Missouri Valley Conference
- Record: 1–7 (0–4 MVC)
- Head coach: Arthur R. Stark (1st season)
- Home stadium: Creighton Stadium

1930 Missouri Valley Conference football standings
	Conf.					Overall
Team	W		L		T	W		L		T
Drake +	3	–	0	–	0	5	–	4	–	0
Oklahoma A&M +	2	–	0	–	0	7	–	2	–	1
Washington University	2	–	2	–	0	4	–	2	–	2
Grinnell	1	–	2	–	0	5	–	4	–	0
Creighton	0	–	4	–	0	1	–	7	–	0
+ – Conference co-champions

The 1930 Creighton Bluejays football team was an American football team that represented Creighton University as a member of the Missouri Valley Conference (MVC) during the 1930 college football season. In its first season under head coach Arthur R. Stark, the team compiled a 1–7 record (0–4 against MVC opponents) and was outscored by a total of 147 to 40. The team played its home games at Creighton Stadium in Omaha, Nebraska.

== Schedule ==
Date	Opponent	Site	Result	Source
September 27	St. Mary's (KS)*	Creighton Stadium; Omaha, NE	W 13–0	
October 4	Kansas*	Creighton Stadium; Omaha, NE	L 0–26	
October 18	Marquette*	Creighton Stadium; Omaha, NE	L 7–19	
October 25	Haskell*	Creighton Stadium; Omaha, NE	L 12–19	
October 31	at Grinnell	Ward Field; Grinnell, IA	L 2–19	
November 8	Drake	Creighton Stadium; Omaha, NE	L 6–38	
November 15	at Washington University	Francis Field; St. Louis, MO	L 0–13	
November 27	Oklahoma A&M	Creighton Stadium; Omaha, NE	L 0–13	
*Non-conference game
