= 1930 Texas Longhorns football team =

American college football season

1930 Texas Longhorns football

SWC champion
- Conference: Southwest Conference
- Record: 8–1–1 (4–1 SWC)
- Head coach: Clyde Littlefield (4th season)
- Captain: Dexter Shelley
- Home stadium: War Memorial Stadium

1930 Southwest Conference football standings
	Conf.					Overall
Team	W		L		T	W		L		T
Texas $	4	–	1	–	0	8	–	1	–	1
Baylor	3	–	1	–	1	6	–	3	–	1
TCU	4	–	2	–	0	9	–	2	–	1
SMU	2	–	2	–	1	6	–	3	–	1
Arkansas	2	–	2	–	0	3	–	6	–	0
Rice	2	–	4	–	0	8	–	4	–	0
Texas A&M	0	–	5	–	0	2	–	7	–	0
$ – Conference champion

The 1930 Texas Longhorns football team was an American football team that represented the University of Texas (now known as the University of Texas at Austin) as a member of the Southwest Conference during the 1930 college football season. In their fourth season under head coach Clyde Littlefield, Texas compiled an 8–1–1 record and finished as SWC champion.

== Schedule ==
Date	Opponent	Site	Result	Attendance	Source
September 20	Southwest Texas State*	Memorial Stadium; Austin, TX	W 36–0	2,000	
September 27	Texas Mines*	Memorial Stadium; Austin, TX	W 28–0		
October 4	Centenary*	Memorial Stadium; Austin, TX	T 0–0		
October 11	Howard Payne*	Memorial Stadium; Austin, TX	W 26–0		
October 18	vs. Oklahoma*	Fair Park Stadium; Dallas, TX (Red River Rivalry)	W 17–7		
October 25	at Rice	Rice Field; Houston, TX (rivalry)	L 0–6		
November 1	SMU	Memorial Stadium; Austin, TX	W 25–7		
November 8	at Baylor	Carroll Field; Waco, TX (rivalry)	W 14–0		
November 15	at TCU	Amon G. Carter Stadium; Fort Worth, TX (rivalry)	W 7–0		
November 27	Texas A&M	Memorial Stadium; Austin, TX (rivalry)	W 26–0		
*Non-conference game
