= 1930 Tulsa Golden Hurricane football team =

American college football season

1930 Tulsa Golden Hurricane football

Big Four champion
- Conference: Big Four Conference
- Record: 7–2 (3–0 Big Four)
- Head coach: Gus Henderson (6th season)
- Home stadium: Skelly Field

1930 Big Four Conference (Oklahoma) football standings
	Conf.					Overall
Team	W		L		T	W		L		T
Tulsa $	3	–	0	–	0	7	–	2	–	0
Oklahoma City	2	–	1	–	0	9	–	1	–	0
Phillips	1	–	2	–	0	6	–	3	–	0
Oklahoma Baptist	0	–	3	–	0	4	–	5	–	0
$ – Conference champion

The 1930 Tulsa Golden Hurricane football team represented the University of Tulsa during the 1930 college football season. In their sixth year under head coach Gus Henderson, the Golden Hurricane compiled a 7–2 record, won the Big Four Conference championship, and outscored their opponents by a total of 171 to 79.

== Schedule ==
Date	Time	Opponent	Site	Result	Attendance	Source
October 4		Arkansas*	Skelly Field; Tulsa, OK	W 26–6		
October 17	8:15 p.m.	Hendrix*	Skelly Field; Tulsa, OK	W 27–0		
October 25		Phillips^{†}	Skelly Field; Tulsa, OK	W 25–0		
October 31		George Washington*	Skelly Field; Tulsa, OK	W 14–7		
November 8		at Oklahoma Baptist	Shawnee, OK	W 14–6		
November 15		Missouri Mines*	Skelly Field; Tulsa, OK	W 18–0		
November 27		Oklahoma City	Skelly Field; Tulsa, OK	W 33–13	15,000	
December 6		Haskell*	Skelly Field; Tulsa, OK	L 7–34		
December 13		Oklahoma A&M*	Skelly Field; Tulsa, OK (rivalry)	L 7–13		
*Non-conference game; ^{†}Homecoming; All times are in Central time
