= 1930 Rice Owls football team =

American college football season

1930 Rice Owls football
- Conference: Southwest Conference
- Record: 8–4 (2–4 SWC)
- Head coach: Jack Meagher (2nd season)
- Home stadium: Rice Field

1930 Southwest Conference football standings
	Conf.					Overall
Team	W		L		T	W		L		T
Texas $	4	–	1	–	0	8	–	1	–	1
Baylor	3	–	1	–	1	6	–	3	–	1
TCU	4	–	2	–	0	9	–	2	–	1
SMU	2	–	2	–	1	6	–	3	–	1
Arkansas	2	–	2	–	0	3	–	6	–	0
Rice	2	–	4	–	0	8	–	4	–	0
Texas A&M	0	–	5	–	0	2	–	7	–	0
$ – Conference champion

The 1930 Rice Owls football team was an American football team that represented Rice Institute as a member of the Southwest Conference (SWC) during the 1930 college football season. In its second season under head coach Jack Meagher, the team compiled an 8–4 record (2–4 against SWC opponents) and was outscored by a total of 135 to 91.

== Schedule ==
Date	Opponent	Site	Result	Attendance	Source
September 20	Southwestern (TX)*	Rice Field; Houston, TX	W 32–6	5,000	
September 27	Sam Houston State*	Rice Field; Houston, TX	W 13–12		
October 4	St. Edward's*	Rice Field; Houston, TX	W 20–0		
October 11	Arizona*	Rice Field; Houston, TX	W 21–0		
October 18	at Arkansas	The Hill; Fayetteville, AR	L 6–7		
October 25	Texas	Rice Field; Houston, TX (rivalry)	W 6–0		
November 1	Sewanee*	Rice Field; Houston, TX	W 12–0		
November 8	TCU	Rice Field; Houston, TX	L 0–20		
November 15	at Texas A&M	Kyle Field; College Station, TX	W 7–0		
November 22	SMU	Rice Field; Houston, TX (rivalry)	L 0–32		
November 29	at Baylor	Carroll Field; Waco, TX	L 4–7		
December 6	Iowa State*	Rice Field; Houston, TX	W 14–7	2,500	
*Non-conference game
