= 1930 SMU Mustangs football team =

American college football season

1930 SMU Mustangs football
- Conference: Southwest Conference
- Record: 6–3–1 (2–2–1 SWC)
- Head coach: Ray Morrison (11th season)
- Captains: Ira Hopper; Louie Long; Malcolm Powell; Bill Skeeters
- Home stadium: Ownby Stadium, Fair Park Stadium

1930 Southwest Conference football standings
	Conf.					Overall
Team	W		L		T	W		L		T
Texas $	4	–	1	–	0	8	–	1	–	1
Baylor	3	–	1	–	1	6	–	3	–	1
TCU	4	–	2	–	0	9	–	2	–	1
SMU	2	–	2	–	1	6	–	3	–	1
Arkansas	2	–	2	–	0	3	–	6	–	0
Rice	2	–	4	–	0	8	–	4	–	0
Texas A&M	0	–	5	–	0	2	–	7	–	0
$ – Conference champion

The 1930 SMU Mustangs football team represented Southern Methodist University (SMU) as a member the Southwest Conference (SWC) during the 1930 college football season. Led by 11th head coach Ray Morrison, the Mustangs compiled and overall record of 6–3–1 overall with a mark of 2–2–1 in conference play, placing fourth.

== Schedule ==
Date	Opponent	Site	Result	Attendance	Source
September 25	Howard Payne*	Ownby Stadium; University Park, TX	W 26–0		
October 4	at Notre Dame*	Notre Dame Stadium; South Bend, IN	L 14–20	14,751	
October 10	Austin*	Ownby Stadium; University Park, TX	W 34–0		
October 18	at Baylor	Carroll Field; Waco, TX	T 14–14		
October 25	Indiana*	Fair Park Stadium; Dallas, TX	W 27–0	25,000	
November 1	at Texas	War Memorial Stadium; Austin, TX	L 7–25	20,000	
November 8	Texas A&M	Ownby Stadium; University Park, TX	W 13–7		
November 15	at Navy*	Memorial Stadium; Baltimore, MD (rivalry)	W 20–7		
November 22	at Rice	Rice Field; Houston, TX (rivalry)	W 32–0		
November 29	TCU	Ownby Stadium; University Park, TX (rivalry)	L 0–13		
*Non-conference game
