= Al Culver =

American football player (1908–1982)

No. 27, 54
- Position: Tackle

Personal information
- Born: June 11, 1908; Glencoe, Illinois, U.S.
- Died: February 7, 1982 (aged 73); Plymouth, Indiana, U.S.
- Listed height: 6 ft 2 in (1.88 m)
- Listed weight: 245 lb (111 kg)

Career information
- High school: St. Thomas (Mendota Heights, Minnesota)
- College: Notre Dame

Career history
- Chicago Bears (1932); Green Bay Packers (1932)

Awards and highlights
- 2× National champion (1929, 1930); Second-team All-American (1930)

Career NFL statistics
- Games played: 4
- Games started: 1
- Stats at Pro Football Reference

Alvin Sager Culver (June 11, 1908 – February 7, 1982) was an American professional football player who was a tackle in the National Football League (NFL) with the Chicago Bears and Green Bay Packers in 1932. He played college football for the Notre Dame Fighting Irish, and was named a second-team All-American in 1930.

== Early life ==
Alvin Sager Culver was born on June 11, 1908, in Glencoe, Illinois. For high school, he attended St. Thomas Military Academy in Mendota Heights, Minnesota. He was a letterman in football, basketball, track, and tennis. Culver played tackle for three years on the football team and was a two-time team captain. He helped the 1926 squad go undefeated. He was a center in basketball, and threw weights on the track team. In May 1926, Culver was reported as being 6 feet 3 inches (1.91 m) tall and weighing 240 pounds (110 kg). He was named St. Thomas' most outstanding athlete for the 1925–26 school year.

== College career ==
Culver initially planned on enrolling at Northwestern University, where his father Alvin H. Culver used to be the head football coach. However, he instead decided to attend the University of Notre Dame. Culver was on the Fighting Irish freshman team during the 1927 season and earned a letter. He sat on the bench during the 1928 season and did not play in any games, although The Morning Union noted that he was a promising prospect. Culver played in varsity games for Notre Dame from 1929 to 1931, helping them win the national championship in 1929 and 1930. He was also named a second-team All-American by the United Press in 1930 at tackle. He wore jersey number 81 while at Notre Dame, and graduated in 1932.

== Professional career ==
Culver played in three games for the Chicago Bears during the 1932 NFL season as a tackle. He was then released and signed by the Green Bay Packers. He spent two weeks with the Packers, starting one game, before being released again.

== Personal life ==
In 1933, at the Chicago World's Fair, Culver jumped into Lake Michigan in an attempt to save a drowning man. The man ended up dying. In 1947, Culver married Ada Madden. He died on February 7, 1982, at a nursing home in Plymouth, Indiana. He was a Catholic.
