= 1930 Kansas State Wildcats football team =

American college football season

1930 Kansas State Wildcats football
- Conference: Big Six Conference
- Record: 5–3 (3–2 Big 6)
- Head coach: Bo McMillin (3rd season)
- Home stadium: Memorial Stadium

1930 Big Six Conference football standings
	Conf.					Overall
Team	W		L		T	W		L		T
Kansas $	4	–	1	–	0	6	–	2	–	0
Oklahoma	3	–	1	–	1	4	–	3	–	1
Kansas State	3	–	2	–	0	5	–	3	–	0
Nebraska	2	–	2	–	1	4	–	3	–	2
Missouri	1	–	2	–	2	2	–	5	–	2
Iowa State	0	–	5	–	0	0	–	9	–	0
$ – Conference champion

The 1930 Kansas State Wildcats football team represented the Kansas State Agricultural College (now known as Kansas State University) as a member the Big Six Conference during the 1930 college football season. Led by third-year head coach Bo McMillin, the Wildcats compiled and overall record of 5–3 overall with a mark of 3–2 in conference play, placing third.

== Schedule ==
Date	Opponent	Site	Result	Attendance	Source
October 4	Washburn*	Memorial Stadium; Manhattan, KS	W 14–0		
October 18	Kansas^{†}	Memorial Stadium; Manhattan, KS (rivalry)	L 0–14	18,000	
October 25	at Oklahoma	Oklahoma Memorial Stadium; Norman, OK	L 0–7	16,000	
November 1	Missouri	Memorial Stadium; Manhattan, KS	W 20–13	6,000	
November 8	at West Virginia*	Mountaineer Field; Morgantown, WV	L 7–23	10,000	
November 15	at Iowa State	State Field; Ames, IA (rivalry)	W 13–0		
November 22	Centre*	Memorial Stadium; Manhattan, KS	W 27–0	5,000	
November 27	at Nebraska	Memorial Stadium; Lincoln, NE (rivalry)	W 10–9		
*Non-conference game; ^{†}Homecoming
