= Lynn King =

American baseball player (1907–1972)

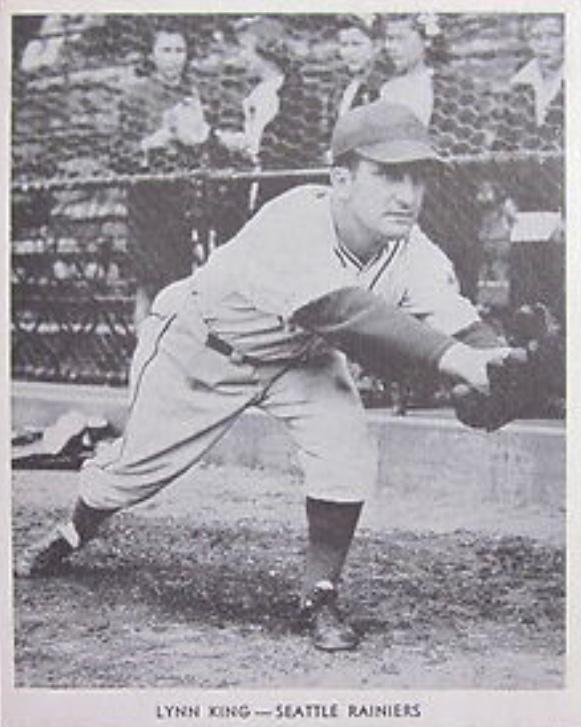
- Outfielder
- Born: November 28, 1907; Villisca, Iowa, U.S.
- Died: May 11, 1972 (aged 64); Atlantic, Iowa, U.S.
- Batted: Left Threw: Right

MLB debut
- September 21, 1935, for the St. Louis Cardinals

Last MLB appearance
- September 30, 1939, for the St. Louis Cardinals

MLB statistics
- Batting average: .208
- Home runs: 0
- Runs batted in: 21
- Stats at Baseball Reference

Teams
- St. Louis Cardinals (1935–1936; 1939)

Lynn Paul King (November 28, 1907 – May 11, 1972) was an American Major League Baseball player from 1935 to 1936 and in 1939. King was born in Villisca, Iowa and died in Atlantic, Iowa. King attended Drake University in Des Moines, Iowa, where he letter in football, basketball, and baseball. He was the starting quarterback for the Drake Bulldogs from 1928 to 1930 and captain of the 1930 Drake Bulldogs football team.
