= 1930 Notre Dame Fighting Irish football team =

American college football season

1930 Notre Dame Fighting Irish football

National champion (Dickinson System)
- Conference: Independent
- Record: 10–0
- Head coach: Knute Rockne (13th season)
- Offensive scheme: Notre Dame Box
- Base defense: 7–2–2
- Captain: Tom Conley
- Home stadium: Notre Dame Stadium

1930 Midwestern college football independents records
	Conf.			Overall
Team	W	L	T	W		L		T
No. 1 Notre Dame		–		10	–	0	–	0
Marquette		–		8	–	0	–	1
Haskell		–		9	–	1	–	0
Michigan State		–		5	–	1	–	2
DePaul		–		4	–	2	–	1
Detroit		–		5	–	3	–	2
Kent State		–		3	–	3	–	1
Saint Louis		–		3	–	3	–	2
John Carroll		–		3	–	5	–	2
Loyola (IL)		–		2	–	6	–	1
Michigan Tech		–		1	–	5	–	0
Rankings from Dickinson System

The 1930 Notre Dame Fighting Irish football team was an American football team that represented the University of Notre Dame as an independent during the 1930 college football season. In their 13th and final season under head coach Knute Rockne, the Fighting Irish compiled a perfect 10–0 record and outscored their opponents by a total of 256 to 74 with three shutouts.

The Dickinson System ranked Notre Dame No. 1 with 25.13 points, ahead of No. 2 Washington State (20.44) and No. 3 Alabama (20.18). By topping the Dickinson Ratings the Irish won the Jack F. Rissman National Intercollegiate Football Trophy; it was the team's third Dickinson national championship and granted the school permanent possession of the trophy. Later analyses also rated Notre Dame as the 1930 national champion, including the Billingsley Report, Boand System, Dunkel System, Helms Athletic Foundation, Houlgate System, National Championship Foundation, Parke H. Davis (co-champion), and Poling System.

The new Notre Dame Stadium made its debut on October 4; it was dedicated the next week. The closest game was a one-point win in late November over previously undefeated Army; the Irish won the annual rivalry game, 7–6, at Soldier Field in Chicago with over 100,000 in attendance. A week later in Los Angeles, Notre Dame shut out once-beaten USC, 27–0, for their 19th consecutive victory.

Two Notre Dame players, quarterback Frank Carideo and halfback Marchy Schwartz, were consensus first-team players on the 1930 All-America college football team. Other Notre Dame players receiving 1930 All-America honors included guard Bert Metzger (first-team selection by the Associated Press and United Press); halfback Marty Brill (first-team selection by the All-America Board); end Tom Conley (second-team selection by the Associated Press, United Press, and Newspaper Enterprise Association); fullback Joe Savoldi (second-team selection by the Associated Press); and tackle Al Culver (second-team selection by the United Press).

Four months after the season ended, on March 31, 1931, Rockne and seven others were killed when a Transcontinental and Western Airline plane crashed in Kansas as Rockne traveled from Kansas City to California.

== Schedule ==
Date	Opponent	Site	Result	Attendance	Source
October 4	SMU	Notre Dame Stadium; Notre Dame, IN	W 20–14	14,751	
October 11	Navy	Notre Dame Stadium; South Bend, IN (rivalry)	W 26–2	40,593	
October 18	Carnegie Tech	Notre Dame Stadium; Notre Dame, IN	W 21–6	30,009	
October 25	at Pittsburgh	Pitt Stadium; Pittsburgh, PA (rivalry)	W 35–19	66,586–74,233	
November 1	Indiana	Notre Dame Stadium; Notre Dame, IN	W 27–0	15,000	
November 8	at Penn	Franklin Field; Philadelphia, PA	W 60–20	75,657	
November 15	Drake	Notre Dame Stadium; Notre Dame, IN	W 28–7	10,106	
November 22	at Northwestern	Dyche Stadium; Evanston, IL (rivalry)	W 14–0	44,648	
November 29	vs. Army	Soldier Field; Chicago, IL (rivalry)	W 7–6	110,000	
December 6	at USC	Memorial Coliseum; Los Angeles, CA (rivalry)	W 27–0	73,967	

== Personnel ==
=== Players ===
The following players participated on the 1930 Notre Dame football team.

- Roy Bailie, left end
- Marty Brill, right halfback, All-American
- Frank Butler, center
- Frank Carideo, quarterback, All-American and College Football Hall of Fame
- Norbert Christman, quarterback
- Tom Conley, captain and right end
- Carl Cronin, quarterback, College Football Hall of Fame
- Al Culver, left tackle
- Dick Donoghue, right tackle
- Norman Greeney, left guard
- Dan Hanley, fullback
- James Harriss, left guard
- Frank Hoffman, left tackle
- Paul Host, left end
- Al Howard, fullback
- Charles Jaskwhich, quarterback
- Clarence Kaplan, right halfback
- Thomas Kassis, left guard
- Frank Kerjes, right guard
- Mike Koken, left halfback
- Ed Kosky, left end
- Joe Kurth, right tackle
- Bernie Leahy, left halfback
- Frank Leahy, left tackle, College Football Hall of Fame
- Richard Mahoney, right end
- Arthur McManmon, right tackle
- Regis McNamara, left tackle
- Bert Metzger, right guard, All-American and College Football Hall of Fame
- Larry Mullins, fullback
- Emmett Murphy, quarterback
- John O'Brien, left end
- Paul O'Connor, right halfback
- Bill Pierce, right guard
- John Rogers, center
- Joe Savoldi, fullback
- Marchmont Schwartz, left halfback, All-American and College Football Hall of Fame
- Joseph Sheeketski, right halfback
- Fred Staab, fullback
- Robert Terlaak, right guard
- George Vlk, right end
- Tommy Yarr, center

=== Staff ===
- Knute Rockne, head coach and director of athletics, College Football Hall of Fame
- Hunk Anderson, assistant coach, College Football Hall of Fame
- Jack Chevigny, assistant coach
- John T. "Ike" Voedisch, assistant coach
- Tim Moynihan, assistant coach
- William B. Jones, freshman coach
- H. Manfred Vezie, freshman coach
- Rev. Michael A. Mulcaire, Chairman Athletic Board of Control
