= 1930 Arkansas Razorbacks football team =

American college football season

1930 Arkansas Razorbacks football
- Conference: Southwest Conference
- Record: 3–6 (2–2 SWC)
- Head coach: Fred Thomsen (2nd season)
- Captain: Milan Creighton
- Home stadium: The Hill

1930 Southwest Conference football standings
	Conf.					Overall
Team	W		L		T	W		L		T
Texas $	4	–	1	–	0	8	–	1	–	1
Baylor	3	–	1	–	1	6	–	3	–	1
TCU	4	–	2	–	0	9	–	2	–	1
SMU	2	–	2	–	1	6	–	3	–	1
Arkansas	2	–	2	–	0	3	–	6	–	0
Rice	2	–	4	–	0	8	–	4	–	0
Texas A&M	0	–	5	–	0	2	–	7	–	0
$ – Conference champion

The 1930 Arkansas Razorbacks football team represented the University of Arkansas in the Southwest Conference (SWC) during the 1930 college football season. In their second year under head coach Fred Thomsen, the Razorbacks compiled a 3–6 record (2–2 against SWC opponents), finished in fifth place in the SWC, and were outscored by their opponents by a combined total of 154 to 78.

== Schedule ==
Date	Opponent	Site	Result	Source
September 27	Ozarks*	The Hill; Fayetteville, AR	W 27–0	
October 4	at Tulsa*	Skelly Field; Tulsa, OK	L 6–26	
October 11	at TCU	Amon G. Carter Stadium; Fort Worth, TX	L 0–40	
October 18	Rice^{†}	The Hill; Fayetteville, AR	W 7–6	
October 25	Texas A&M	Kavanaugh Field; Little Rock, AR (rivalry)	W 13–0	
November 1	vs. LSU*	State Fair Stadium; Shreveport, LA (rivalry)	L 12–27	
November 8	Oklahoma A&M*	The Hill; Fayetteville, AR	L 0–26	
November 15	Baylor	The Hill; Fayetteville, AR	L 7–22	
November 27	at Centenary*	State Fair Stadium; Shreveport, LA	L 6–7	
*Non-conference game; ^{†}Homecoming

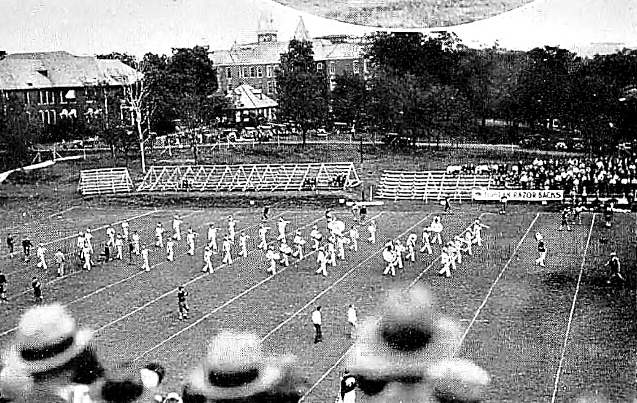
The Arkansas Marching Band in 1930
