= 1930 Oklahoma Sooners football team =

American college football season

1930 Oklahoma Sooners football
- Conference: Big Six Conference
- Record: 4–3–1 (3–1–1 Big 6)
- Head coach: Adrian Lindsey (4th season)
- Captain: Bob Fields
- Home stadium: Memorial Stadium

1930 Big Six Conference football standings
	Conf.					Overall
Team	W		L		T	W		L		T
Kansas $	4	–	1	–	0	6	–	2	–	0
Oklahoma	3	–	1	–	1	4	–	3	–	1
Kansas State	3	–	2	–	0	5	–	3	–	0
Nebraska	2	–	2	–	1	4	–	3	–	2
Missouri	1	–	2	–	2	2	–	5	–	2
Iowa State	0	–	5	–	0	0	–	9	–	0
$ – Conference champion

The 1930 Oklahoma Sooners football team represented the University of Oklahoma in the 1930 college football season. In their fourth year under head coach Adrian Lindsey, the Sooners compiled a 4–3–1 record (3–1–1 against conference opponents), finished in second place in the Big Six Conference, and outscored their opponents by a combined total of 119 to 71.

No Sooners received All-America honors in 1930, but two Sooners received all-conference honors: guard Hilary Lee and back Buster Mills.

== Schedule ==
Date	Opponent	Site	Result	Attendance	Source
October 4	New Mexico*	Memorial Stadium; Norman, OK	W 47–0		
October 11	Nebraska	Memorial Stadium; Norman, OK (rivalry)	W 20–7		
October 18	vs. Texas*	Fair Park Stadium; Dallas, TX (Red River Shootout)	L 7–17	25,000	
October 25	Kansas State	Memorial Stadium; Norman, OK	W 7–0		
November 1	at Iowa State	State Field; Ames, IA	W 19–13	4,645	
November 15	at Kansas	Memorial Stadium; Lawrence, KS	L 0–13		
November 22	at Oklahoma A&M*	Lewis Field; Stillwater, OK (Bedlam)	L 0–7	18,000	
November 27	Missouri	Memorial Stadium; Norman, OK (rivalry)	T 0–0		
*Non-conference game
