= 1930 Kent State Golden Flashes football team =

American college football season

1930 Kent State Golden Flashes football
- Conference: Independent
- Record: 3–3–1
- Head coach: Merle E. Wagoner (6th season)
- Home stadium: Rockwell Field

1930 Midwestern college football independents records
	Conf.			Overall
Team	W	L	T	W		L		T
No. 1 Notre Dame		–		10	–	0	–	0
Marquette		–		8	–	0	–	1
Haskell		–		9	–	1	–	0
Michigan State		–		5	–	1	–	2
DePaul		–		4	–	2	–	1
Detroit		–		5	–	3	–	2
Kent State		–		3	–	3	–	1
Saint Louis		–		3	–	3	–	2
John Carroll		–		3	–	5	–	2
Loyola (IL)		–		2	–	6	–	1
Michigan Tech		–		1	–	5	–	0
Rankings from Dickinson System

The 1930 Kent State Golden Flashes football team was an American football team that represented Kent State College (later renamed Kent State University) during the 1930 college football season. In its sixth season under head coach Merle E. Wagoner, Kent State compiled a 3–3–1 record and outscored opponents by a total of 61 to 42.

== Schedule ==
Date	Opponent	Site	Result	Attendance	Source
October 3	at Mount Union	Alliance, OH	L 6–18	3,000	
October 11	at Akron	Buchtel Field; Akron, OH (rivalry)	L 6–12		
October 18	at Case	Cleveland, OH	L 0–6		
October 25	Ashland	Rockwell Field; Kent, OH	T 0–0		
November 1	Hiram	Rockwell Field; Kent, OH	W 6–0		
November 8	at Capital	Columbus, OH	W 26–0		
November 15	Defiance^{†}	Bowers Field; Kent, OH	W 13–6		
^{†}Homecoming
