= 1930 Marquette Golden Avalanche football team =

American college football season

1930 Marquette Golden Avalanche football
- Conference: Independent
- Record: 8–0–1
- Head coach: Frank Murray (9th season)
- Home stadium: Marquette Stadium

1930 Midwestern college football independents records
	Conf.			Overall
Team	W	L	T	W		L		T
No. 1 Notre Dame		–		10	–	0	–	0
Marquette		–		8	–	0	–	1
Haskell		–		9	–	1	–	0
Michigan State		–		5	–	1	–	2
DePaul		–		4	–	2	–	1
Detroit		–		5	–	3	–	2
Kent State		–		3	–	3	–	1
Saint Louis		–		3	–	3	–	2
John Carroll		–		3	–	5	–	2
Loyola (IL)		–		2	–	6	–	1
Michigan Tech		–		1	–	5	–	0
Rankings from Dickinson System

The 1930 Marquette Golden Avalanche football team represented Marquette University as an independent during the 1930 college football season. In its ninth season under head coach Frank Murray, the team compiled an undefeated 8–0–1 record, shut out eight of nine opponents, and outscored all opponents by a total of 155 to 7. The sole setback was a scoreless tie with Gus Dorais' Detroit Titans on November 15. Marquette played its home games at Marquette Stadium in Milwaukee.

Frank Murray was Marquette's head football coach for 19 years and was posthumously inducted into the College Football Hall of Fame in 1983.

== Schedule ==
Date	Opponent	Site	Result	Attendance	Source
September 27	Lawrence	Marquette Stadium; Milwaukee, WI	W 27–0		
October 3	Grinnell	Marquette Stadium; Milwaukee, WI	W 6–0		
October 11	Drake	Marquette Stadium; Milwaukee, WI	W 12–0	15,000	
October 18	at Creighton	Creighton Stadium; Omaha, NE	W 19–7		
October 24	Ripon	Marquette Stadium; Milwaukee, WI	W 53–0	12,000	
November 1	at Boston College	Fenway Park; Boston, MA	W 6–0	7,000	
November 8	Iowa^{†}	Marquette Stadium; Milwaukee, WI	W 7–0	17,000	
November 15	Detroit	Marquette Stadium; Milwaukee, WI	T 0–0	23,000	
November 27	at Butler	Sellick Bowl; Indianapolis, IN	W 25–0		
^{†}Homecoming
