= 1932 Tulsa Golden Hurricane football team =

American college football season

1932 Tulsa Golden Hurricane football

Big Four champion
- Conference: Big Four Conference
- Record: 7–1–1 (3–0 Big Four)
- Head coach: Gus Henderson (8th season)
- Home stadium: Skelly Field

1932 Big Four Conference (Oklahoma) football standings
	Conf.					Overall
Team	W		L		T	W		L		T
Tulsa $	3	–	0	–	0	7	–	1	–	1
Oklahoma Baptist	2	–	1	–	0	5	–	4	–	0
Oklahoma City	1	–	2	–	0	5	–	5	–	1
Phillips	0	–	3	–	0	3	–	7	–	0
$ – Conference champion

The 1932 Tulsa Golden Hurricane football team represented the University of Tulsa during the 1932 college football season. In their eighth year under head coach Gus Henderson, the Golden Hurricane compiled a 7–1–1 record, won the Big Four Conference championship, and outscored 175 to 36. The team began the season with a loss to Oklahoma (0-7) and ended it with a win over Ole Miss (26-0).

== Schedule ==
Date	Time	Opponent	Site	Result	Attendance	Source
October 1		at Oklahoma*	Memorial Stadium; Norman, OK	L 0–7		
October 7		Washburn*	Skelly Field; Tulsa, OK	W 20–0		
October 15		Phillips	Skelly Field; Tulsa, OK	W 21–2		
October 22		George Washington*	Skelly Field; Tulsa, OK	W 29–14	7,000	
October 29		Oklahoma Baptist	Skelly Field; Tulsa, OK	W 39–13		
November 5		Oklahoma A&M*^{†}	Skelly Field; Tulsa, OK (rivalry)	T 0–0		
November 11		Missouri Mines*	Skelly Field; Tulsa, OK	W 26–0		
November 24	2:30 p.m.	at Oklahoma City	Goldbug Field; Oklahoma City, OK	W 14–0	10,000	
December 3		Ole Miss*	Skelly Field; Tulsa, OK	W 26–0		
*Non-conference game; ^{†}Homecoming; All times are in Central time
