= 1930 Drake Bulldogs football team =

American college football season

1930 Drake Bulldogs football

MVC co-champion
- Conference: Missouri Valley Conference
- Record: 5–4 (3–0 MVC)
- Head coach: Ossie Solem (10th season)
- Captain: Lynn King
- Home stadium: Drake Stadium

1930 Missouri Valley Conference football standings
	Conf.					Overall
Team	W		L		T	W		L		T
Drake +	3	–	0	–	0	5	–	4	–	0
Oklahoma A&M +	2	–	0	–	0	7	–	2	–	1
Washington University	2	–	2	–	0	4	–	2	–	2
Grinnell	1	–	2	–	0	5	–	4	–	0
Creighton	0	–	4	–	0	1	–	7	–	0
+ – Conference co-champions

The 1930 Drake Bulldogs football team was an American football team that represented Drake University in the Missouri Valley Conference (MVC) during the 1930 college football season. In its tenth season under head coach Ossie Solem, the team compiled a 5–4 record (3–0 against MVC opponents), tied for the MVC championship, and outscored all opponents by a total of 166 to 120.

Quarterback Lynn King was the team captain. Other key players included halfback Chuck Van Koten.

== Schedule ==
Date	Opponent	Site	Result	Attendance	Source
October 3	vs. Oregon*	Soldier Field; Chicago, IL	L 7–14	12,000	
October 11	at Marquette*	Marquette Stadium; Milwaukee, WI	L 0–12	15,000	
October 18	Grinnell	Drake Stadium; Des Moines, IA	W 20–7	17,000	
October 25	at Missouri*	Memorial Stadium; Columbia, MO	L 13–14		
November 1	Washington University	Drake Stadium; Des Moines, IA	W 12–0		
November 8	at Creighton	Creighton Stadium; Omaha, NE	W 38–6	8,000	
November 15	at Notre Dame*	Notre Dame Stadium; Notre Dame, IN	L 7–28	15,000	
November 22	Iowa State*	Drake Stadium; Des Moines, IA	W 20–19	12,500	
November 29	at Temple*	Temple Stadium; Philadelphia, PA	W 49–20		
*Non-conference game
