= 1930 DePaul Blue Demons football team =

American college football season

1930 DePaul Blue Demons football
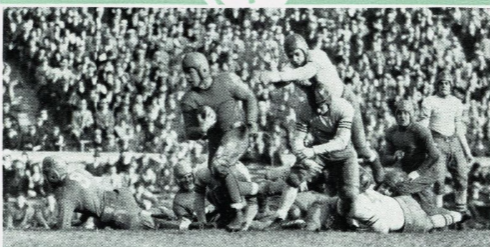
- DePaul's victory over Loyola on November 2 at Soldier Field
- Conference: Independent
- Record: 4–2–1
- Head coach: Eddie Anderson (6th season)
- Home stadium: DePaul Field, Soldier Field

1930 Midwestern college football independents records
	Conf.			Overall
Team	W	L	T	W		L		T
No. 1 Notre Dame		–		10	–	0	–	0
Marquette		–		8	–	0	–	1
Haskell		–		9	–	1	–	0
Michigan State		–		5	–	1	–	2
DePaul		–		4	–	2	–	1
Detroit		–		5	–	3	–	2
Kent State		–		3	–	3	–	1
Saint Louis		–		3	–	3	–	2
John Carroll		–		3	–	5	–	2
Loyola (IL)		–		2	–	6	–	1
Michigan Tech		–		1	–	5	–	0
Rankings from Dickinson System

The 1930 DePaul Blue Demons football team was an American football team that represented DePaul University as an independent during the 1930 college football season. In its sixth season under head coach Eddie Anderson, the team compiled a 4–2–1 record and outscored opponents by a total of 67 to 44.

== Schedule ==
Date	Opponent	Site	Result	Attendance	Source
October 4	Buena Vista	DePaul Field; Chicago, IL	W 28–13		
October 17	at Saint Mary's (MN)	College Field; Winona, MN	W 13–7	800	
November 2	vs. Loyola (IL)	Soldier Field; Chicago, IL	W 6–0		
November 8	Louisville	DePaul Field; Chicago, IL	W 14–0		
November 15	at Illinois JV	Memorial Stadium; Champaign, IL	T 6–6		
November 22	San Francisco	DePaul Field; Chicago, IL	L 0–14		
November 30	St. John's	Soldier Field; Chicago, IL	L 0–4		
