= Gus Henderson =

American football coach (1889–1965)

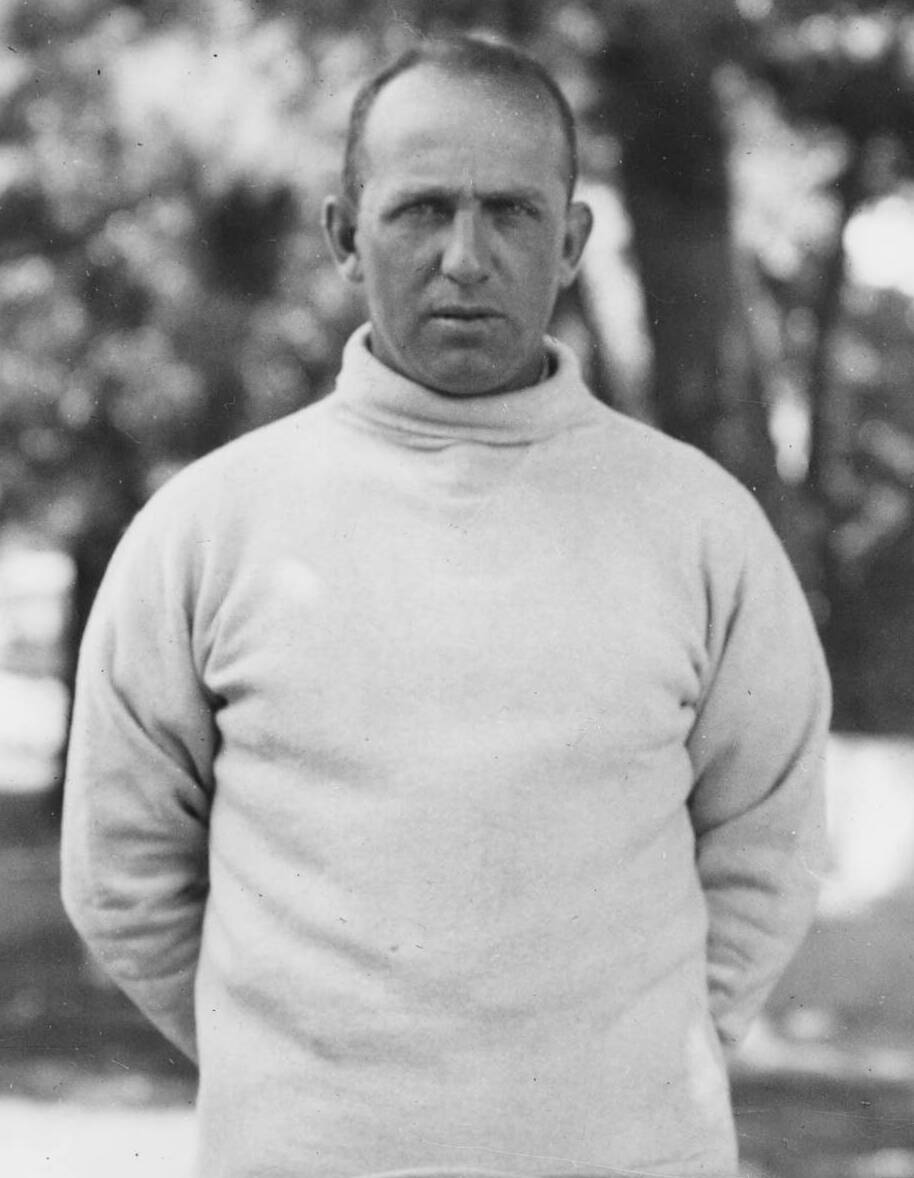
- Henderson, circa 1921

Biographical details
- Born: March 10, 1889; Oberlin, Ohio, U.S.
- Died: December 16, 1965 (aged 76); Desert Hot Springs, California, U.S.

Coaching career (HC unless noted)

Football
- 1919–1925: USC
- 1925–1935: Tulsa
- 1937: Los Angeles Bulldogs
- 1939: Detroit Lions
- 1940–1942: Occidental

Basketball
- 1919–1921: USC

Baseball
- 1920–1921: USC

Head coaching record
- Overall: 126–42–7 (college football); 18–6 (college basketball); 18–7–1 (college baseball); 8–0 (AFL); 6–5 (NFL)
- Bowls: 2–0

Accomplishments and honors

Championships
- Football; 1 OIC (1925); 3 Big Four (1929–1930, 1932); 1 MVC (1935); 1 SCC (1942)

Elmer Clinton "Gloomy Gus" Henderson (March 10, 1889 – December 16, 1965) was an American football coach. He served as the head coach at the University of Southern California (1919–1924), the University of Tulsa (1925–1935), and Occidental College (1940–1942), compiling a career college football record of 126–42–7. Henderson's career winning percentage of .865 at USC is the best of any Trojans football coach, and his 70 wins with the Tulsa Golden Hurricane remain a team record. In between his stints at Tulsa and Occidental, Henderson moved to the professional ranks, helming the Los Angeles Bulldogs of the American Football League in 1937 and the Detroit Lions of the National Football League (NFL) in 1939. Henderson also coached basketball and baseball at USC, each for two seasons.

== Early life ==
Henderson was born in Oberlin, Ohio on 10 March 1889. He graduated from Oberlin College, and then coached at Broadway High School in Seattle, Washington.

== USC ==
Henderson arrived at the University of Southern California (USC) in 1919 and set the Trojans football team on its first steps toward national prominence. He led USC to a 6–0 record in 1920, the team's first perfect season of at least three games, and their first appearance in the Rose Bowl in 1923. In the 1923 Rose Bowl, the first Rose Bowl game to be held in its namesake stadium, USC's faced their first opponent from east of the Rocky Mountains. The Trojans defeated the heavily favored Penn State Nittany Lions, 14–3. Penn State arrived at the game 45 minutes late and ten minutes after the scheduled kickoff because of a traffic jam. Henderson accused Penn State coach Hugo Bezdek of doing so as a psychological tactic, and the coaches nearly began throwing punches. Later, they exchanged public insults after the game.

Gordon Campbell, a halfback USC's 1923 Rose Bowl team, said of Henderson, "He put the Trojans on the map. He was a great coach when we needed one most because we were just growing up."

Under Henderson's tenure, USC joined the Pacific Coast Conference in 1922 and, in 1923, moved from Bovard Field on campus to play in the Los Angeles Memorial Coliseum. He received his nickname from Los Angeles Times sports editor Paul Lowry because of his tendency to poor-mouth the Trojans' prospects before a game. Gloomy Gus was a character in a popular era comic strip, Happy Hooligan.

Regarding his offensive tactics, which proved successful, Los Angeles Times sports editor Paul Zimmerman noted, "Until someone proves otherwise, it must be assumed that Henderson invented the spread formation, variations of which have become an important form of attack in modern day football."

During his time at USC, Henderson also coached the Trojans baseball team in 1920 and 1921 and school's basketball team for two seasons from 1919 to 1921.

Henderson left USC following the 1924 season, despite a 45–7 record, partly due to his inability to defeat rival California in five tries. USC's loss to California in 1924 loss followed one week later by an upset at the hands of Saint Mary's. Henderson's contract was bought out at the end of the year. At the time, USC also had strained relations with Cal and Stanford University, who threatened to sever conference ties with USC due to their belief that USC was using cash to recruit players.

USC quarterback Chet Dolley was dismissive of the idea, noting, "That was really a joke, because the university didn't have a dime." He stated that Henderson "made his players responsible for bringing in athletes. I came from Long Beach, so I was assigned to that area. So, naturally, I was in charge of getting Morley Drury."

Among the other players who arrived at USC during Henderson's tenure was the school's first two All-Americans, Brice Taylor and Mort Kaer, as well as future Pro Football Hall of Famer, Red Badgro.

Taylor recalled his former coach, "Not only was he a great coach, but he was a wonderful man. He was real person. I'll never forget the day I was standing on a corner, shivering, because it was cold, and Gus drives by in his car. He sees me, stops and backs up, and says, 'What's the matter Brice, are you cold?' And I said, 'I sure am coach.' So he reaches into the back seat and takes out his brand new, blue Chesterfield coat and says, 'Here, take this, it's yours.' You know, years after I left SC, when I was teaching in the South, I was still wearing that coat."

USC finished its 1924 regular season with their first-ever regularly scheduled game against an eastern team, winning at home over Syracuse, 16–0. The Trojans ended the year with a 20–7 win over Missouri in the Christmas Festival Bowl, held at the Coliseum. Howard Jones of Iowa succeeded Henderson as USC's head coach in 1925, and controversies quickly abated, although California still canceled its 1925 game against USC, the only year between 1920 and 2020 in which the teams have not met.

== Tulsa ==
Henderson moved to the University of Tulsa in 1925 and served as the Golden Hurricane head coach for the next 11 seasons. He oversaw the construction of the Skelly Field, which opened in 1930. Under Henderson, Tulsa captured five conference championships: the Oklahoma Collegiate Conference title in 1925, the Big Four Conference titles in 1929, 1930, and 1932, and the Missouri Valley Conference title in 1935. Henderson's final record at Tulsa was 70–25–5.

== Professional football ==
Henderson returned to Los Angeles and became the head coach of the professional Los Angeles Bulldogs, which operated as an independent team in 1936 before joining the American Football League in 1937 and capturing the conference title with a perfect 8–0 record. The Bulldogs returned to independent play in 1938 when the league folded.

In 1939, Henderson was hired as coach of the National Football League's Detroit Lions by team owner Dick Richards, who also owned Los Angeles radio station KMPC. Henderson replaced Earl "Dutch" Clark, who had resigned to take a job as head coach of the Cleveland Rams. The Lions posted a 6–5 record during their 1939 season, but the team was sold before the 1940 season. Despite a three-year contract, Henderson was released by new owner Fred Mandel.

== Later coaching career ==
Again, Henderson returned to Los Angeles to take over the football program at Occidental College. As a head coach from 1940 to 1942, he posted a record of 11–10–2, but the program was suspended due to World War II, and he ended his coaching career.

== Death ==
Henderson died on 16 December 1965 at age 76 in Desert Hot Springs, California of complications from pneumonia. He was survived by his wife, Kathryn, and their daughter. His cremated remains were returned to Oberlin, Ohio. He was inducted into the USC Athletic Hall of Fame in 2005.

== Head coaching record ==
=== College football ===
Year	Team	Overall	Conference	Standing	Bowl/playoffs
USC Trojans (Independent) (1919–1921)
1919	USC	4–1			
1920	USC	6–0			
1921	USC	10–1			
USC Trojans (Pacific Coast Conference) (1922–1924)
1922	USC	10–1	3–1	4th	W Rose
1923	USC	6–2	2–2	T–3rd	
1924	USC	9–2	2–1	T–4th	W Los Angeles Christmas Festival
USC:		45–7	7–4		
Tulsa Golden Hurricane (Oklahoma Intercollegiate Conference) (1925–1928)
1925	Tulsa	6–2	4–0	1st	
1926	Tulsa	7–2	5–1	2nd	
1927	Tulsa	8–1	3–1	T–3rd	
1928	Tulsa	7–2–1	3–1–1	2nd	
Tulsa Golden Hurricane (Big Four Conference) (1929–1932)
1929	Tulsa	6–3–1	4–0–1	1st	
1930	Tulsa	7–2	3–0	1st	
1931	Tulsa	8–3	2–1	2nd	
1932	Tulsa	7–1–1	3–0	1st	
Tulsa Golden Hurricane (Independent) (1933–1934)
1933	Tulsa	6–1			
1934	Tulsa	5–2–1			
Tulsa Golden Hurricane (Missouri Valley Conference) (1935)
1935	Tulsa	3–6–1	3–0	T–1st	
Tulsa:		70–25–5	30–4–3		
Occidental Tigers (Southern California Conference) (1940–1942)
1940	Occidental	3–4–1	2–2	3rd	
1941	Occidental	5–2–1	3–1	2nd	
1942	Occidental	3–4	2–1	T–1st	
Occidental:		11–10–2	6–4		
Total:		126–42–7			
National championship Conference title Conference division title or championship game berth
