= 1930 Kansas Jayhawks football team =

American college football season

1930 Kansas Jayhawks football

Big 6 champion
- Conference: Big Six Conference
- Record: 6–2 (4–1 Big 6)
- Head coach: Bill Hargiss (3rd season)
- Captain: Charles Smoot
- Home stadium: Memorial Stadium

1930 Big Six Conference football standings
	Conf.					Overall
Team	W		L		T	W		L		T
Kansas $	4	–	1	–	0	6	–	2	–	0
Oklahoma	3	–	1	–	1	4	–	3	–	1
Kansas State	3	–	2	–	0	5	–	3	–	0
Nebraska	2	–	2	–	1	4	–	3	–	2
Missouri	1	–	2	–	2	2	–	5	–	2
Iowa State	0	–	5	–	0	0	–	9	–	0
$ – Conference champion

The 1930 Kansas Jayhawks football team represented the University of Kansas in the Big Six Conference during the 1930 college football season. In their third season under head coach Bill Hargiss, the Jayhawks compiled a 6–2 record (4–1 against conference opponents), The Jayhawks only allowed 50 total points all season and recorded four shutouts. In each of the Jayhawks six victories they allowed 7 or fewer points. They played their home games at Memorial Stadium in Lawrence, Kansas. Charles Smoot was the team captain. The Jayhawks were Big 6 champions. It is to date the last conference championship Kansas has won without sharing the title.

== Schedule ==
Date	Opponent	Site	Result	Attendance	Source
October 4	at Creighton*	Creighton Stadium; Omaha, NE	W 26–0	13,000	
October 10	Haskell*	Memorial Stadium; Lawrence, KS	W 33–7	15,000	
October 18	at Kansas State	Memorial Stadium; Manhattan, KS (Sunflower Showdown)	W 14–0	17,000	
October 25	Iowa State	Memorial Stadium; Lawrence, KS	W 20–6	6,214	
November 1	at Penn*	Franklin Field; Philadelphia, PA	L 6–21	62,000	
November 8	Nebraska^{†}	Memorial Stadium; Lawrence, KS (rivalry)	L 0–16	20,000	
November 15	Oklahoma	Memorial Stadium; Lawrence, KS	W 13–0		
November 23	at Missouri	Memorial Stadium; Columbia, MO (Border War)	W 32–0	24,000	
*Non-conference game; ^{†}Homecoming
