= 1930 Saint Louis Billikens football team =

American college football season

1930 Saint Louis Billikens football
- Conference: Independent
- Record: 3–3–2
- Head coach: Chile Walsh (1st season)
- Captain: Harlan "Snakes" Gazelle
- Home stadium: Edward J. Walsh Memorial Stadium

1930 Midwestern college football independents records
	Conf.			Overall
Team	W	L	T	W		L		T
No. 1 Notre Dame		–		10	–	0	–	0
Marquette		–		8	–	0	–	1
Haskell		–		9	–	1	–	0
Michigan State		–		5	–	1	–	2
DePaul		–		4	–	2	–	1
Detroit		–		5	–	3	–	2
Kent State		–		3	–	3	–	1
Saint Louis		–		3	–	3	–	2
John Carroll		–		3	–	5	–	2
Loyola (IL)		–		2	–	6	–	1
Michigan Tech		–		1	–	5	–	0
Rankings from Dickinson System

The 1930 Saint Louis Billikens football team was an American football team that represented Saint Louis University as an independent during the 1930 college football season. In their first season under head coach Chile Walsh, the Billikens compiled a 3–3–2 record and outscored opponents by a total of 107 to 82. The team played its home games at its newly-constructed Edward J. Walsh Memorial Stadium in St. Louis. Halfback Harlan "Snakes" Gazelle was the team captain.

== Schedule ==
Date	Opponent	Site	Result	Attendance	Source
September 26	Cornell (IA)	Edward J. Walsh Memorial Stadium; St. Louis, MO	W 27–0		
October 3	at Oklahoma City	Goldbug Field; Oklahoma City, OK	L 0–21		
October 11	Missouri	Edward J. Walsh Memorial Stadium; St. Louis, MO	W 20–0	10,000	
October 17	at Butler	Fairview Bowl; Indianapolis, IN	W 7–0	8,000	
October 31	Missouri Mines	Edward J. Walsh Memorial Stadium; St. Louis, MO	T 33–33	11,000	
November 7	Loyola (IL)	Edward J. Walsh Memorial Stadium; St. Louis, MO	L 6–7	6,500	
November 14	Loyola (LA)	Edward J. Walsh Memorial Stadium; St. Louis, MO	L 7–14	6,000	
November 27	Washington University	Edward J. Walsh Memorial Stadium; St. Louis, MO	T 7–7	15,381	
