= 1930 Iowa State Cyclones football team =

American college football season

1930 Iowa State Cyclones football
- Conference: Big Six Conference
- Record: 0–9 (0–5 Big 6)
- Head coach: C. Noel Workman (5th season)
- Captain: Maynard Spear
- Home stadium: State Field

1930 Big Six Conference football standings
	Conf.					Overall
Team	W		L		T	W		L		T
Kansas $	4	–	1	–	0	6	–	2	–	0
Oklahoma	3	–	1	–	1	4	–	3	–	1
Kansas State	3	–	2	–	0	5	–	3	–	0
Nebraska	2	–	2	–	1	4	–	3	–	2
Missouri	1	–	2	–	2	2	–	5	–	2
Iowa State	0	–	5	–	0	0	–	9	–	0
$ – Conference champion

The 1930 Iowa State Cyclones football team represented Iowa State College of Agricultural and Mechanic Arts (later renamed Iowa State University) in the Big Six Conference during the 1930 college football season. In their fifth and final season under head coach C. Noel Workman, the Cyclones compiled a 0–9 record (0–5 against conference opponents), finished in last place in the conference, and were outscored by opponents by a combined total of 134 to 64. They played their home games at State Field in Ames, Iowa.

Maynard Spear was the team captain. No Iowa State player was selected as a first-team all-conference player.

== Schedule ==
Date	Time	Opponent	Site	Result	Attendance	Source
October 4	2:30 pm	at Illinois*	Memorial Stadium; Champaign, IL	L 0–7	32,718	
October 18	2:00 pm	Nebraska	State Field; Ames, IA (rivalry)	L 12–14	5,611	
October 25	2:00 pm	at Kansas	Memorial Stadium; Lawrence, KS	L 6–20	6,214	
November 1	2:00 pm	Oklahoma^{†}	State Field; Ames, IA	L 13–19	4,645	
November 8	2:00 pm	at Missouri	Memorial Stadium; Columbia, MO (rivalry)	L 0–14	4,488	
November 15	2:00 pm	Kansas State	State Field; Ames, IA (rivalry)	L 0–13	3,320	
November 22	2:00 pm	at Drake*	Drake Stadium; Des Moines, IA	L 19–20	8,079	
November 29	2:30 pm	at Loyola (LA)*	Loyola University Stadium; New Orleans, LA	L 7–14	8,000	
December 6	3:00 pm	at Rice*	Rice Field; Houston, TX	L 7–14	2,500	
*Non-conference game; ^{†}Homecoming; All times are in Central time
