= Tom Conley (American football) =

American football player and coach, basketball coach (1908–1976)

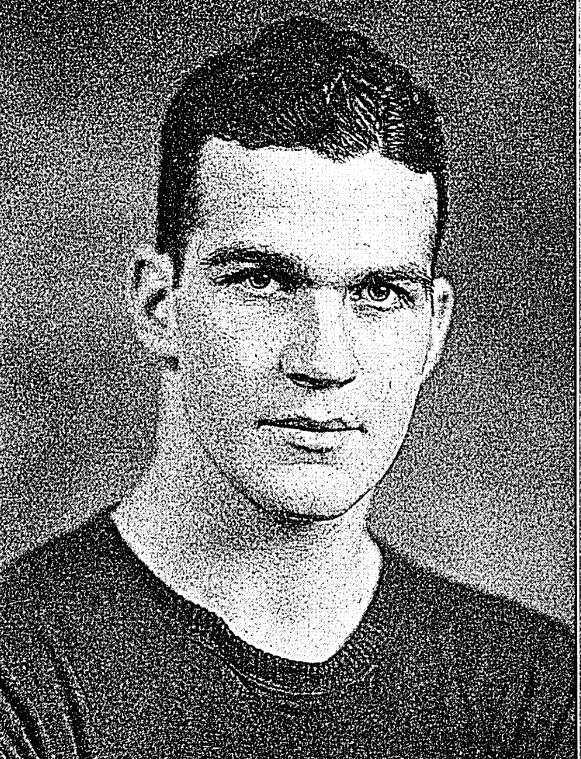
- Conley, 1930

Biographical details
- Born: May 7, 1908; Philadelphia, Pennsylvania, U.S.
- Died: December 14, 1976 (aged 68); Chicago, Illinois, U.S.

Playing career

Football
- 1928–1930: Notre Dame
- Position: End

Coaching career (HC unless noted)

Football
- 1931–1932: La Salle
- 1933–1935: Notre Dame (ends)
- 1936–1942: John Carroll

Basketball
- 1931–1933: La Salle
- 1936–1943: John Carroll

Head coaching record
- Overall: 33–34–7 (football); 86–87 (basketball)

Accomplishments and honors

Awards
- Second-team All-American (1930); Third-team All-American (1929)

Thomas Aquinas Conley (May 7, 1908 – December 14, 1976) was an American football player and coach of football and basketball. Conley played college football at the University of Notre Dame from 1928 to 1930. He was the captain of the 1930 Notre Dame Fighting Irish football team, which won a national championship. Conley was named a second-team All-American as an end that year. He served as the head football coach at La Salle University from 1931 to 1932 and at John Carroll University from 1936 to 1942, compiling a career college football coaching record of 33–34–7. Conley was also the head basketball coach at La Salle from 1931 to 1933 and at John Carroll from 1936 to 1943, tallying a career college basketball mark of 86–87. He worked as an assistant football coach in charge of the ends at his alma mater, Notre Dame, from 1933 to 1935. A native of Philadelphia, Conley attended Roman Catholic High School there.

Conley died from pneumonia, on December 14, 1976, in Chicago.

== Head coaching record ==
=== Football ===
Year	Team	Overall	Conference	Standing	Bowl/playoffs
La Salle Explorers (Independent) (1931–1932)
1931	La Salle	4–4			
1932	La Salle	4–2–2			
La Salle:		8–6–2			
John Carroll Blue Streaks (Ohio Athletic Conference) (1936–1942)
1936	John Carroll	2–7	1–4	T–18th	
1937	John Carroll	3–5	1–2	14th	
1938	John Carroll	6–2–1	4–0–2	2nd	
1939	John Carroll	7–1	2–1	T–8th	
1940	John Carroll	2–6	0–3	T–17th	
1941	John Carroll	2–5–1	1–2–1	T–11th	
1942	John Carroll	3–2–3	3–0–1	2nd	
John Carroll:		25–28–5	12–12–4		
Total:		33–34–7			

=== Basketball ===
Record table
Season	Team	Overall	Conference	Standing	Postseason
La Salle Explorers (Independent) (1931–1933)
1931–32	La Salle	15–8			
1932–33	La Salle	13–3			
La Salle:		28–11			
John Carroll Blue Streaks (Ohio Athletic Conference) (1936–1943)
1936–37	John Carroll	4–13	2–8	18th	
1937–38	John Carroll	5–9	3–5	11th	
1938–39	John Carroll	13–14	6–4	T–5h	
1939–40	John Carroll	12–8	5–4	T–6th	
1940–41	John Carroll	8–13	5–7	11th	
1941–42	John Carroll	8–10	5–6	9th	
1942–43	John Carroll	8–9	5–6	10th	
John Carroll:		58–76	31–40		
Total:		86–87			
