= Vee Green =

American college coach (1900–1967)

Biographical details
- Born: October 9, 1900; Oakwood, Illinois, U.S.
- Died: May 12, 1967 (aged 66); Urbana, Illinois, U.S.

Playing career

Football
- 1922–1923: Illinois
- 1926: Louisville Colonels
- Position: Center

Coaching career (HC unless noted)

Football
- 1924–1927: Waukegan HS (IL)
- 1928–1932: Oklahoma City
- 1933–1946: Drake

Basketball
- 1930–1933: Oklahoma City
- 1944–1946: Drake

Baseball
- 1940–1942: Drake

Administrative career (AD unless noted)
- ?–1933: Oklahoma City
- 1940–?: Drake

Head coaching record
- Overall: 103–72–10 (college football); 32–41 (college basketball); 24–7–1 (high school football)
- Bowls: 1–0

Accomplishments and honors

Championships
- Big Four (1931)

Vivian Julius "Vee" Green (October 9, 1900 – May 12, 1967) was an American football player, coach of football, basketball, and baseball, college athletics administrator, and radio color commentator and sports announcer. He served as the head football coach at Oklahoma City University from 1928 to 1932 and at Drake University for fourteen seasons from 1933 to 1946. Green was also the head basketball coach at Oklahoma City from 1930 to 1933 and at Drake from 1944 to 1946, tallying a career college basketball mark of 32–41. A native of Urbana, Illinois, Green played college football at the University of Illinois at Urbana–Champaign from 1922 to 1923. He played as a center and was a teammate of Red Grange.

Later in his life, Green did color commentary and football analysis for the AM station WHO in Des Moines, Iowa. He did frequent sports broadcasts alongside Jim Zabel including for Iowa's famous 1953 14–14 tie at Notre Dame.

In the fall of 1966, Green was diagnosed with glioblastoma. Green died at age 66 on May 12, 1967, from brain cancer.

== Personal life ==
Green was the son of Lincoln Hamlin Green of Ohio and Mary Esther (Cranston) Green of Illinois. Vee Green married Iowan Lois Hardaway on February 5, 1954. They had 3 children.

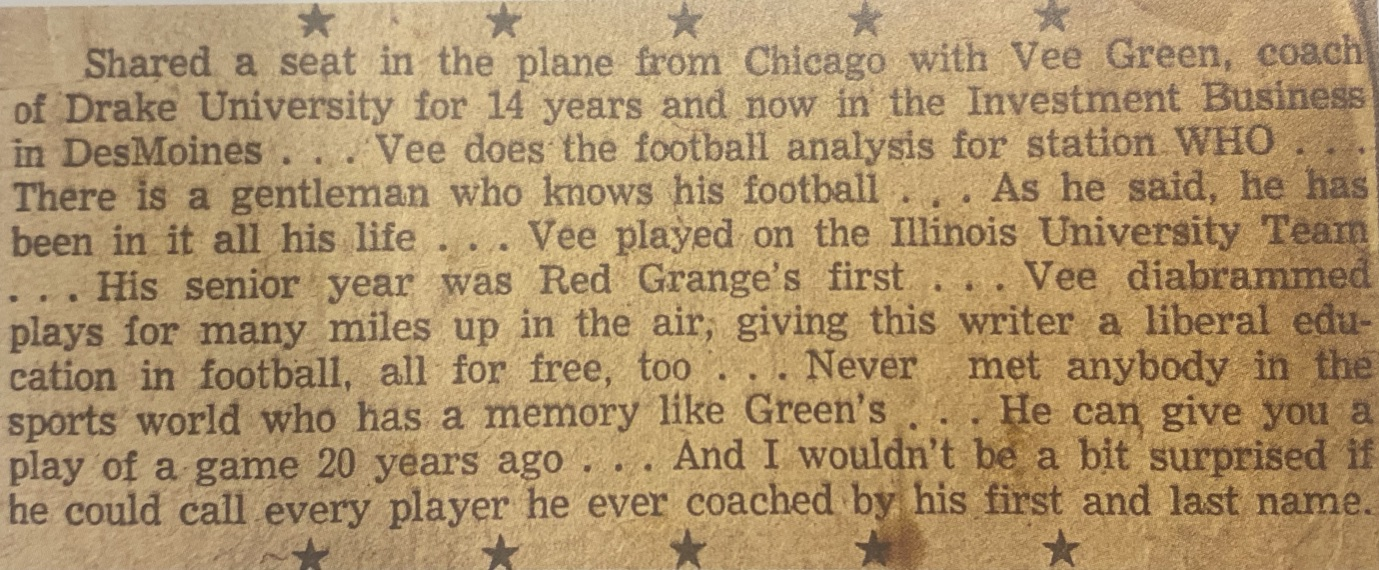
News Clipping Green Football Analysis for WHO

== Head coaching record ==
=== College football ===
Year	Team	Overall	Conference	Standing	Bowl/playoffs
Oklahoma City Goldbugs (Oklahoma Intercollegiate Conference) (1928)
1928	Oklahoma City	6–2–1	2–2–1	T–7th	
Oklahoma City Goldbugs (Big Four Conference) (1929–1932)
1929	Oklahoma City	5–5	2–3	T–2nd	
1930	Oklahoma City	9–1	2–1	2nd	
1931	Oklahoma City	12–0	3–0	1st	
1932	Oklahoma City	5–5–1	1–2	3rd	
Oklahoma City:		37–13–2	10–8–1		
Drake Bulldogs (Missouri Valley Conference) (1933–1946)
1933	Drake	6–3–1	5–1	2nd	
1934	Drake	3–6–1	2–2	T–3rd	
1935	Drake	4–4–2	1–2–1	4th	
1936	Drake	6–4	4–2	3rd	
1937	Drake	8–2	4–1	2nd	
1938	Drake	5–4–1	2–1–1	T–2nd	
1939	Drake	5–5	2–3	4th	
1940	Drake	4–5	2–2	T–3rd	
1941	Drake	4–5–1	0–3–1	6th	
1942	Drake	3–7	1–4	T–5th	
1943	Drake	4–2	0–0	NA	
1944	Drake	7–2	0–0	NA	
1945	Drake	5–4–1	1–2	4th	W Raisin
1946	Drake	2–6–1	0–4	5th	
Drake:		66–59–8	24–27–3		
Total:		103–72–10			
National championship Conference title Conference division title or championship game berth
