= 1930 Grinnell Pioneers football team =

American college football season

1930 Grinnell Pioneers football
- Conference: Missouri Valley Conference
- Record: 5–4 (1–2 MVC)
- Head coach: Lester Watt (4th season)
- Home stadium: Ward Field

1930 Missouri Valley Conference football standings
	Conf.					Overall
Team	W		L		T	W		L		T
Drake +	3	–	0	–	0	5	–	4	–	0
Oklahoma A&M +	2	–	0	–	0	7	–	2	–	1
Washington University	2	–	2	–	0	4	–	2	–	2
Grinnell	1	–	2	–	0	5	–	4	–	0
Creighton	0	–	4	–	0	1	–	7	–	0
+ – Conference co-champions

The 1930 Grinnell Pioneers football team was an American football team that represented Grinnell College during the 1930 college football season as a member of the Missouri Valley Conference. In their fourth year under head coach Lester Watt, the team compiled a 5–4 record.

== Schedule ==
Date	Opponent	Site	Result	Attendance	Source
September 27	Iowa Wesleyan*	Ward Field; Grinnell, IA	W 19–0		
October 3	at Marquette*	Marquette Stadium; Milwaukee, WI	L 0–6		
October 10	at Detroit*	University of Detroit Stadium; Detroit, MI	L 6–47		
October 18	at Drake	Drake Stadium; Des Moines, IA	L 7–20	17,000	
October 25	at Carleton*	Northfield, MN	W 14–13		
October 31	Creighton^{†}	Ward Field; Grinnell, IA	W 19–2		
November 8	at Washington University	Francis Field; St. Louis, MO	L 0–6		
November 14	Cornell (IA)*	Ward Field; Grinnell, IA	W 12–3		
November 21	Iowa State Teachers*	Ward Field; Grinnell, IA	W 12–0		
*Non-conference game; ^{†}Homecoming
