= Roger Grove =

American football player (1908–1986)

- Grove in 1935

No. 10, 11
- Positions: Blocking back Halfback (American football)

Personal information
- Born: June 19, 1908; Greenville, Ohio, USA
- Died: December 19, 1986 (aged 78); Torrance, California, USA

Career information
- High school: Sturgis (MI)
- College: Michigan State

Career history
- Green Bay Packers (1931–1935)

Awards and highlights
- NFL champion (1931); All-American (1930); MSU Athletics Hall of Fame (2000)

Career statistics
- Games: 51
- Starts: 26
- Rushing yards: 308 (3.1 average)
- Receiving yards: 489 (15.3 average)
- Touchdowns: 7
- Stats at Pro Football Reference

Roger Robert Grove (June 19, 1908 – December 19, 1986) was a professional American football running back in the National Football League (NFL). He played five seasons for the Green Bay Packers including the 1931 team that won the NFL Championship. He lettered at Michigan State in 1928, 1929, and 1930.

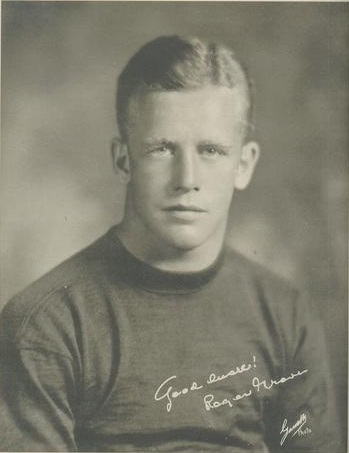

Grove was regarded as one of the fastest players on the Packers team during the first half of the 1930s, along with Bob Monnett, and distinguished himself as a punt returner for head coach Curly Lambeau's squad.
