= 1930 Oklahoma City Goldbugs football team =

American college football season

1930 Oklahoma City Goldbugs football
- Conference: Big Four Conference
- Record: 9–1 (2–1 Big Four)
- Head coach: Vee Green (3rd season)
- Home stadium: Goldbug Field

1930 Big Four Conference (Oklahoma) football standings
	Conf.					Overall
Team	W		L		T	W		L		T
Tulsa $	3	–	0	–	0	7	–	2	–	0
Oklahoma City	2	–	1	–	0	9	–	1	–	0
Phillips	1	–	2	–	0	6	–	3	–	0
Oklahoma Baptist	0	–	3	–	0	4	–	5	–	0
$ – Conference champion

The 1930 Oklahoma City Goldbugs football team was an American football team that represented Oklahoma City University during the 1930 college football season as a member of the Big Four Conference. In Vee Green's third season as head coach, the team compiled a 9–1 record.

== Schedule ==
Date	Time	Opponent	Site	Result	Attendance	Source
September 19		Abilene Christian*	Goldbug Field; Oklahoma City, OK	W 40–14		
September 26		Baker*	Goldbug Field; Oklahoma City, OK	W 30–0		
October 3		Saint Louis*	Goldbug Field; Oklahoma City, OK	W 21–0		
October 10	8:00 p.m.	Central State Teachers*	Goldbug Field; Oklahoma City, OK	W 27–0		
October 18		Oklahoma A&M*	Goldbug Field; Oklahoma City, OK	W 6–0		
October 24		Oklahoma Baptist	Goldbug Field; Oklahoma City, OK	W 26–0	4,000	
November 1		at Davis & Elkins*	Elkins, WV	W 13–2		
November 8		at Friends*	Wichita, KS	W 49–6		
November 14		Phillips	Goldbug Field; Oklahoma City, OK	W 27–14		
November 27		at Tulsa	Skelly Field; Tulsa, OK	L 13–33	15,000	
*Non-conference game
