= Edward J. Walsh Memorial Stadium =

Edward J Walsh Memorial Stadium
- Former names: Oakland Stadium
- Address: 5200 Oakland Avenue, St Louis, Missouri, US
- Owner: St Louis University
- Capacity: 18,000
- Record attendance: 18,000, 1934 Washington University Football Game

Construction
- Built: 1929-1930
- Opened: October 1930
- Closed: September 1956
- Demolished: April 1957
- Years active: 20
- Cost: $350,000, $6.5m in 2025
- Builder: Osborn Engineering Company

Tenants
- University of St Louis, Archdiocese of St. Louis, St Louis Public School District, St Louis University High School, St Louis Gunners, Various Midget & Stock Car Racing Promoters

The Edward J. Walsh Memorial Stadium was opened in 1930. Owned by and home to teams of St. Louis University, it was built primarily to host the university's football team. It was located at 5200 Oakland Avenue, St. Louis, Missouri, United States. Built by Osborn Engineering Company, it closed for university football in 1949 and all other uses in 1956, being demolished in 1957.

== Background ==
On December 5, 1929, it was announced that a very generous gift has been received from Mrs. Julia Maffitt Walsh for the development of an athletic campus and university stadium. The gift established these as a memorial to her son the late Edward J. Walsh Jr. who was a noted university athlete.

Previously the university had held sports events at a site subsequently taken over by The Backer Memorial High school and had used Handlan's Park and then Forest Park Boulevard for practice and scrimmages and Sportsman's Park was leased annually for important games. However, these arrangements proved unsatisfactory due to the necessity for and cost of travel and the inadequate park facilities.

Mrs. Walsh responded to the need for proper facilities. Her son, a 1902 graduate of the university, had touted a future plan regarding a stadium. At the time of his death in 1928 after an operation for appendicitis, he was a member of the university's President's Advisory committee and the Athletic Council of the institution.

The land that the stadium was built on was owned by the university who acquired it as part of the gift from Anna Backer. It had been a city dump before the development.

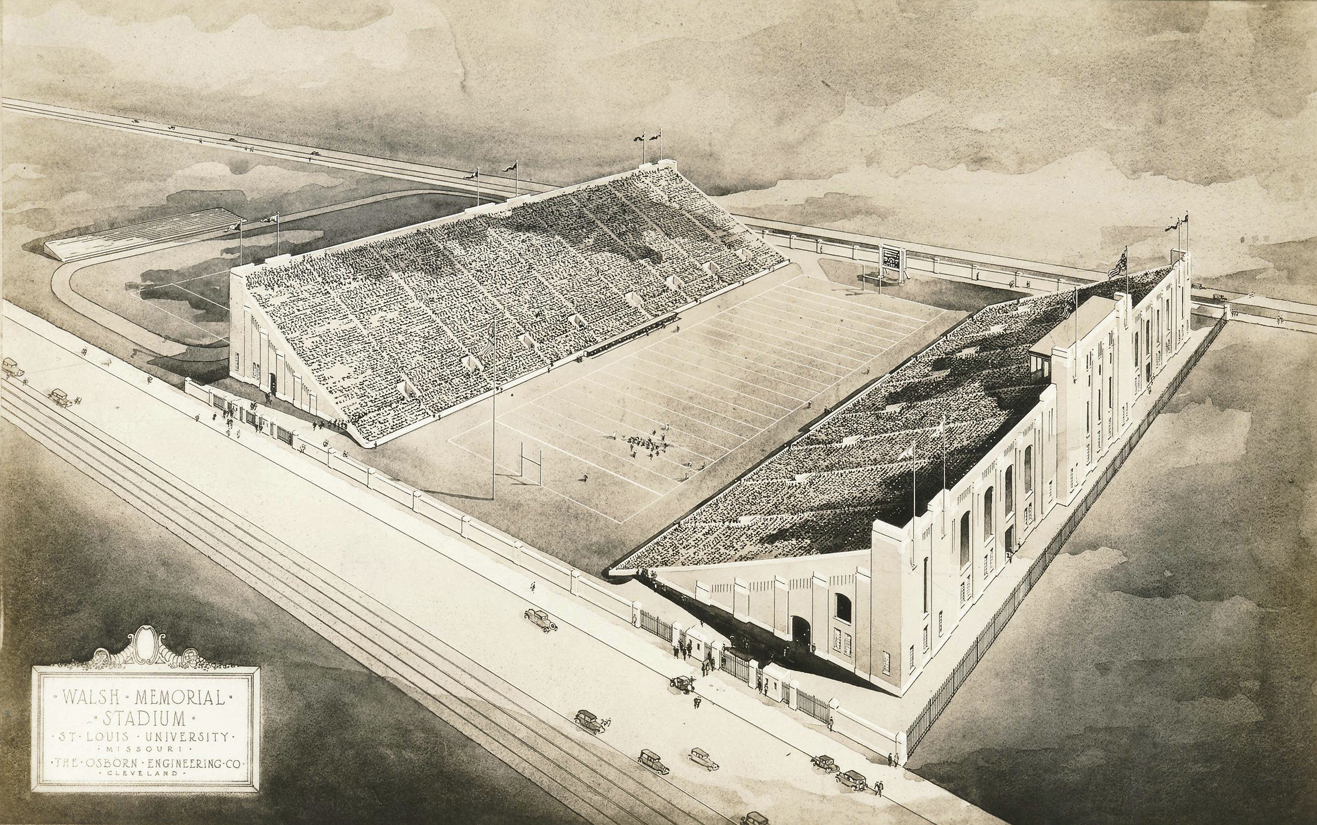
Artist's plan of the stadium, 1929

== Stadium design and construction ==
Site of Walsh Stadium

As a permanent home for the university football team, The Billikens, the stadium had locker rooms, showers, training rooms, and offices for the football staff.

The project cost $350,000 for a 15,000-capacity stadium, with both east and west stands having seven sections capable of holding 1,000 people. When temporary bleachers were added behind the end zones, capacity could reach 18,000. There was no cover for spectators, but it was equipped with lights and loudspeakers.

There was the potential to develop to a 40,000 capacity and add separate baseball pitch, track, and tennis facilities. No developments were undertaken.

== Stadium opening and football use ==
The 1930 season was a mixed one for the Billikens. They won their first competitive home game at the stadium beating Cornell College 27–0 on September 26. The stadium was dedicated on Saturday October 11, 1930, with Governor and Mrs. Henry Caulfield and distinguished guests attending the dedicatory exercises, which were immediately followed by a 20–0 win over Missouri University in front of a 10,500 crowd.

They finished with 2 wins, 2 losses and 2 ties in the six home games played. 15,381 turned out for the final game of the season, a 7–7 home tie in the annual Thanksgiving match with Washington University on November 27.

In 1935 and 1937 the stadium was home to the St. Louis Gunners, an independent professional football team, that played the last three games of the 1934 National Football League season, replacing the Cincinnati Reds on the league schedule after the Reds' league membership was suspended. The team were unsuccessful in being elected to the NFL in 1935 and played in various regional leagues until they folded in 1940.

A National League professional exhibition football game was played Saturday September 12, 1953, between the New York Giants and the Baltimore Colts for the benefit of Fontbonne College and St. Joseph's Academy.

Additionally local high school football games were played often with strong attendances. St. Louis University High School was next door to the stadium and were regular users.

== Non-football use ==
Apart from football, soccer was regularly hosted at the stadium. This was for the university team and also many important local and regional league and cup matches. From the early 1900s St Louis has been a hotbed for US soccer. The St. Louis Soccer League, founded in 1907, was the country's only fully professional soccer league of its day. In 1920 Ben Millers won the National Challenge Cup. Between then and 1939 St Louis teams went to the final thirteen times. The stadium also hosted visiting teams, The St Louis All-Stars beat Maccabi Tel Aviv of Palestine in October 1936.

On August 26 and 27, 1933, two one-day games of cricket were played by the visiting Vandals Cricket Club of Cambridge, England. The first against St. Louis District was a draw; they beat St Louis All-Stars by 5 wickets in the second game.

The stadium was regularly used for religious events, gatherings and worship over many years, especially by the Archdiocese of St Louis. Ten thousand people, including students from all the Catholic high schools and colleges in the city gathered for a Holy Hour on May 1, 1948, to pray for peace.

Many one-off events were also held at the stadium. The new 1949 Ford models were displayed in a special sale promotion show in June 1949. The show was sponsored by 23 local Ford dealers. In August 1953 a nine-day St. Louis firemen's rodeo and wild west show in aid of the Firemen's Relief Association to aid disabled firemen and the widows and orphans of deceased city fire fighters. Tex Ritter together with Duncan Renaldo and Leo Carrillo, famously known as the Cisco Kid and Pancho headlined.

== Auto racing ==
In 1935 a 1/5th mile dirt track was added outside of the football field to enable midget car racing, which ran in the football offseason until suspension in 1942 due to WWII. Once the ban was lifted in 1945, racing immediately returned to the stadium. It began once again with midget cars but by the early 1950s, stock car racing had taken over. Many of the races were sanctioned by the AAA Contest Board.

It is reputed that the track was added as the son of the Walsh family, Edward J. Walsh Jr., had become interested in automobile racing at an early age. A 1931 graduate of the university he went on to win championships in midget and sprint car competition. A business magnate, civic leader and philanthropist he was a successful Kurtis Kraft racecar dealer. Together they formed Kurtis Sports Cars, Inc., a company operating separately from Kurtis Kraft. One of their cars won the 1953 AAA Car Championship. He became president of the Sports Car Club of America in 1958.

== End of football ==
The 1949 university football season was a poor one for the Billikens with a record of 2 wins, 6 losses and one tie, with no wins in the Missouri Valley Conference. The final game was a 35–0 home loss to Houston on November 24 in front of 6,823 spectators. It was reported that the university had lost $100,000 in 1948 and 1949 due to conference payments and guarantees for visiting teams. After the end of the season the university decided to end its football program, and the stadium lost its main reason for existence.

From 1930 to 1949 the university played 116 games at the stadium. They won 65, lost 41 and drew 10 outscoring their opponents 1,935 to 1,173. The record attendance was 18,000 in 1934 for the annual game against Washington University which before WWII was a major draw for spectators. In 1946 17,951 watched Missouri University win 19–14 at the stadium.

== Renaming ==
On July 25, 1952, the stadium was renamed Oakland Stadium. The Very Rev. Paul C. Reinert, S.J., president of the university, explained that as most of the activities were no longer connected with the university, the predominant sentiment was that the memory of the Walsh would better be perpetuated by a building in use at the university all the time. A new dormitory was subsequently named in memory of Edward J. Walsh. Jr. The Gothic Revival-style building was listed on the National Register of Historic Places in 1977 and remains in use.

== Closure and demolition ==
Non-football events continued from 1950 onwards, most notably high school football games, religious events and stock car racing. As well as sanctioned racing many exhibition events were held. In June 1951 B. Ward Beam's world champion daredevils presented 15 of the world's greatest auto thrillers show.

The decision to close the stadium was made in 1956. On September 28, 1956, a football game between St. Louis University High School and St. Mary's High School was the final event. It was demolished in April 1957.

Nothing remains at the site of the stadium though the dedication stone has been preserved. A mixed retail and commercial unit now stand on the space where the stadium once stood including a brewery and bar facing Oakland Avenue.
