= List of Arizona State Sun Devils football seasons =

The Arizona State Sun Devils football team competes in the National Collegiate Athletic Association (NCAA) Division I Football Bowl Subdivision, representing Arizona State University.

== Seasons ==
Year	Coach	Overall	Conference	Standing	Bowl/playoffs	Coaches^{#}	AP^{°}
Fred Irish (Independent) (1897–1906)
1897	Fred Irish	0–1					
1898	No team						
1899	Fred Irish	3–0					
1900	Fred Irish	1-1					
1901	No team						
1902	Fred Irish	2–1					
1903	Fred Irish	2–0					
1904	Fred Irish	4–0					
1905	Fred Irish	0–3					
1906	Fred Irish	0–2					
1907–13	No team						
George Schaeffer (Independent) (1914–1916)
1914	George Schaeffer	4–3					
1915	George Schaeffer	3–2					
1916	George Schaeffer	0–3					
1917–18	No team						
George Cooper (Independent) (1919)
1919	George Cooper	0–2					
1920–21	No team						
Ernest Wills (Independent) (1922)
1922	Ernest Wills	0–3–1					
Aaron McCreary (Independent) (1923–1929)
1923	Aaron McCreary	4–2					
1924	Aaron McCreary	7–1–1					
1925	Aaron McCreary	6–2					
1926	Aaron McCreary	4–1–1					
1927	Aaron McCreary	2–3–1					
1928	Aaron McCreary	3–2–1					
1929	Aaron McCreary	0–6					
Ted Shipkey (Independent) (1930)
1930	Ted Shipkey	3–5–1					
Ted Shipkey (Border Conference) (1931–1932)
1931	Ted Shipkey	6–2	2–2	1st			
1932	Ted Shipkey	4–3–1	2–2–1	3rd			
Rudy Lavik (Border Conference) (1933–1937)
1933	Rudy Lavik	3–5	1–3	5th			
1934	Rudy Lavik	4–3–1	2–2	4th			
1935	Rudy Lavik	2–5–1	2–3–1	4th			
1936	Rudy Lavik	4–5	2–3	4th			
1937	Rudy Lavik	0–8–1	0–5	7th			
Dixie Howell (Border Conference) (1938–1941)
1938	Dixie Howell	3–6	0–4	7th			
1939	Dixie Howell	8–2–1	4–1	1st	T Sun		
1940	Dixie Howell	7–2–2	3–1–1	1st	L Sun		
1941	Dixie Howell	5–5–1	2–4–1	7th			
Hilman Walker (Border Conference) (1942)
1942	Hilman Walker	2–8	2–5	7th			
1943–45	No team						
Steve Coutchie (Border Conference) (1946)
1946	Steve Coutchie	2–7–2	1–4–1	8th			
Ed Doherty (Border Conference) (1947–1950)
1947	Ed Doherty	4–7	3–4	6th			
1948	Ed Doherty	5–5	3–2	T–3rd			
1949	Ed Doherty	7–3	4–1	2nd	L Salad		
1950	Ed Doherty	9–2	4–1	2nd	L Salad		
Larry Siemering (Border Conference) (1951)
1951	Larry Siemering	6–3–1	4–1	2nd			
Clyde Smith (Border Conference) (1952–1954)
1952	Clyde Smith	6–3	4–0	1st			
1953	Clyde Smith	4–5–1	1–3	5th			
1954	Clyde Smith	5–5	3–1	2nd			
Dan Devine (Border Conference) (1955–1957)
1955	Dan Devine	8–2–1	4–1	2nd			
1956	Dan Devine	9–1	3–1	2nd			
1957	Dan Devine	10–0	4–0	1st		12	12
Frank Kush (Border Conference) (1958–1961)
1958	Frank Kush	7–3	4–1	2nd			
1959	Frank Kush	10–1	5–0	1st			
1960	Frank Kush	7–3	3–2	3rd			
1961	Frank Kush	7–3	3–0	1st			
Frank Kush (Western Athletic Conference) (1962–1977)
1962	Frank Kush	7–2–1	1–1	(Note: Arizona State played fewer than qualifying number of conference games.)		T–18	
1963	Frank Kush	8–1	3–0			13	
1964	Frank Kush	8–2	0–2				
1965	Frank Kush	6–4	3–1	2nd			
1966	Frank Kush	5–5	3–2	3rd			
1967	Frank Kush	8–2	4–1	2nd		20	
1968	Frank Kush	8–2	5–1	2nd			
1969	Frank Kush	8–2	6–1	1st			
1970	Frank Kush	11–0	7–0	1st	W Peach	8	6
1971	Frank Kush	11–1	7–0	1st	W Fiesta	6	8
1972	Frank Kush	10–2	5–1	1st	W Fiesta	13	13
1973	Frank Kush	11–1	6–1	1st	W Fiesta	10	9
1974	Frank Kush	7–5	4–3	3rd			
1975	Frank Kush	12–0	7–0	1st	W Fiesta	2	2
1976	Frank Kush	4–7	4–3	3rd			
1977	Frank Kush	9–3	6–1	1st	L Fiesta	18	18
Frank Kush (Pacific-10 Conference) (1978–1979)
1978	Frank Kush	9–3	4–3	4th	W Garden State	T–19	
1979	Frank Kush (Note: The first five games were coached by Frank Kush prior to his firing and Bob Owens finished out the season. Arizona State later forfeited four of their wins, including three conference victories.)	6–6	3–4	7th			
Darryl Rogers (Pacific-10 Conference) (1980–1984)
1980	Darryl Rogers	7–4	5–3	4th			
1981	Darryl Rogers	9–2	5–2	2nd			16
1982	Darryl Rogers	10–2	5–2	2nd	W Fiesta	6	6
1983	Darryl Rogers	6–4–1	3–3–1	6th			
1984	Darryl Rogers	5–6	3–4	6th			
John Cooper (Pacific-10 Conference) (1985–1987)
1985	John Cooper	8–4	5–2	3rd	L Holiday		
1986	John Cooper	10–1–1	5–1–1	1st	W Rose	5	4
1987	John Cooper	7–4–1	3–3–1	4th	W Freedom		20
Larry Marmie (Pacific-10 Conference) (1988–1991)
1988	Larry Marmie	6–5	3–4	5th			
1989	Larry Marmie	6–4–1	3–3–1	5th			
1990	Larry Marmie	4–7	2–5	8th			
1991	Larry Marmie	6–5	4–4	5th			
Bruce Snyder (Pacific-10 Conference) (1992–2000)
1992	Bruce Snyder	6–5	4–4	6th			
1993	Bruce Snyder	6–5	4–4	6th			
1994	Bruce Snyder	3–8	2–6	10th			
1995	Bruce Snyder	6–5	4–4	7th			
1996	Bruce Snyder	11–1	8–0	1st	L Rose	4	4
1997	Bruce Snyder	9–3	6–2	3rd	W Sun	14	14
1998	Bruce Snyder	5-6	4–4	6th			
1999	Bruce Snyder	6–6	5–3	4th	L Aloha		
2000	Bruce Snyder	6–6	3–5	6th	L Aloha		
Dirk Koetter (Pacific-10 Conference) (2001–2006)
2001	Dirk Koetter	4–7	1–7	9th			
2002	Dirk Koetter	8–6	5–3	3rd	L Holiday		
2003	Dirk Koetter	5–7	2–6	T–8th			
2004	Dirk Koetter	9–3	5–3	T–3rd	W Sun	20	19
2005	Dirk Koetter	7–5	4–4	T–4th	W Insight		
2006	Dirk Koetter	7–6	4–5	T–5th	L Hawaii		
Dennis Erickson (Pacific-10 / Pac-12 Conference) (2007–2011)
2007	Dennis Erickson	10–3	7–2	T–1st	L Holiday	13	16
2008	Dennis Erickson	5–7	4–5	6th			
2009	Dennis Erickson	4–8	2–7	9th			
2010	Dennis Erickson	6–6	4–5	T–5th			
2011	Dennis Erickson	6–7	4–5	T–3rd (South)	L Maaco		
Todd Graham (Pac-12 Conference) (2012–2017)
2012	Todd Graham	8–5	5–4	T–2nd (South)	W Fight Hunger		
2013	Todd Graham	10–4	8–1	1st (South)	L Holiday	20	21
2014	Todd Graham	10–3	6–3	T–2nd (South)	W Sun	14	12
2015	Todd Graham	6–7	4–5	4th (South)	L Cactus		
2016	Todd Graham	5–7	2–7	T–4th (South)			
2017	Todd Graham	7–6	6–3	2nd (South)	L Sun		
Herm Edwards (Pac-12 Conference) (2018–2022)
2018	Herm Edwards	7–6	5–4	2nd (South)	L Las Vegas		
2019	Herm Edwards	8–5	4–5	3rd (South)	W Sun		
2020	Herm Edwards	2–2	2–2	4th (South)			
2021	Herm Edwards	0–5^{[Note A]}	0–3^{[Note A]}	3rd (South)	L Las Vegas		
2022	Herm Edwards (Note: After starting the season with 1–2, head coach Herm Edwards was fired on September 18. Shaun Aguano took over as interim head coach.)	1–9^{[Note A]}	0–7^{[Note A]}	10th			
Kenny Dillingham (Pac-12 Conference) (2023)
2023	Kenny Dillingham	3–9	2–7	T–9th			
Kenny Dillingham (Big 12 Conference) (2024–present)
2024	Kenny Dillingham	11–3	7–2	T–1st	L Peach^{†} (CFP Quarterfinal)	7	7
2025	Kenny Dillingham	8–5	6–3	T–4th	L Sun^{†}		
Total:		648–428–24					
National championship Conference title Conference division title or championship game berth
^{†}Indicates Bowl Coalition, Bowl Alliance, BCS, or CFP / New Years' Six bowl.; ^{#}Rankings from final Coaches Poll.

^A. Arizona State finished with a 8–5 overall record for the 2021 season and 3–9 for 2022, but the NCAA later vacated 8 of Arizona State's victories and their 2021 bowl appearance, resulting in an official season record of 0–5 in 2021 and 1–9 in 2022.
