= List of Arizona State Sun Devils head football coaches =

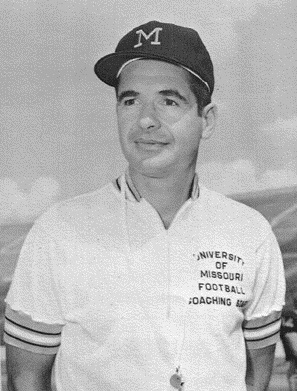
Dan Devine served as head coach of the Sun Devils from 1955 to 1957 and has the highest winning percentage in program history.

The Arizona State Sun Devils college football team represents Arizona State University in the Big 12 Conference. The Sun Devils compete as part of the NCAA Division I Football Bowl Subdivision. The program has had 24 head coaches and two interim head coaches since it began play during the 1897 season. Since November 2022, Kenny Dillingham has served as head coach at Arizona State.

Eleven coaches have led Arizona State in postseason bowl games: Dixie Howell, Ed Doherty, Frank Kush, Darryl Rogers, John Cooper, Bruce Snyder, Dirk Koetter, Dennis Erickson, Todd Graham, Herm Edwards, and Dillingham. Eight of those coaches also won conference championships: Ted Shipkey, Clyde B. Smith, and Dan Devine each captured one and Kush two as a member of the Border Conference; Kush captured seven as a member of the Western Athletic Conference; Cooper and Snyder each captured one as a member of the Pacific-10; and Dillingham captured one as a member of the Big 12.

Kush is the leader in seasons coached and games won, with 176 victories during his 22 years with the program. Devine has the highest winning percentage at 0.887. George E. Cooper has the lowest winning percentage of those who have coached more than one game, with 0.000. Of the 24 different head coaches who have led the Sun Devils, Howell, Devine, Kush, Cooper, and Erickson have been inducted into the College Football Hall of Fame.

== Key ==
Key to symbols in coaches list
General		Overall		Conference		Postseason (Note: Although the first Rose Bowl Game was played in 1902, it has been continuously played since the 1916 game, and is recognized as the oldest bowl game by the NCAA. "—" indicates any season prior to 1916 when postseason games were not played.)	
No.	Order of coaches (Note: A running total of the number of head coaches, with coaches who served separate tenures being counted only once. Interim head coaches are represented with "Int" and are not counted in the running total. "—" indicates the team played but either without a coach or no coach is on record. "X" indicates an interim year without play.)	GC	Games coached	CW	Conference wins	PW	Postseason wins
DC	Division championships	OW	Overall wins	CL	Conference losses	PL	Postseason losses
CC	Conference championships	OL	Overall losses	CT	Conference ties	PT	Postseason ties
NC	National championships	OT	Overall ties (Note: Overtime rules in college football were introduced in 1996, making ties impossible in the period since.)	C%	Conference winning percentage		
†	Elected to the College Football Hall of Fame	O%	Overall winning percentage (Note: When computing the win–loss percentage, a tie counts as half a win and half a loss.)				

== Coaches ==
List of head football coaches showing season(s) coached, overall records, conference records, postseason records, championships and selected awards (Note: Statistics correct as of the end of the 2025 NCAA Division I FBS football season.)
No.	Name	Season(s) (Note: Arizona State did not field teams for the 1898, 1901, 1907–1913, 1917, 1918, 1920, 1921, and 1943–1945 seasons.)	GC	OW	OL	OT	O%	CW	CL	CT	C%	PW	PL	PT	CC	NC	Awards
1	Frederick M. Irish	1897; 1899–1900; 1902–1906	20	12	8	0	0.600	—	—	—	—	—	—	—	—	—	—
2	George Schaeffer	1914–1916	15	7	8	0	0.467	—	—	—	—	—	—	—	—	—	—
3	George E. Cooper	1919	2	0	2	0	.000	—	—	—	—	—	—	—	—	—	—
4	Ernest C. Wills	1922	4	0	3	1	0.125	—	—	—	—	—	—	—	—	—	—
5	Aaron McCreary	1923–1929	46	25	17	4	0.587	—	—	—	—	—	—	—	—	—	—
6	Ted Shipkey	1930–1932	25	13	10	2	0.560	5	2	0	0.714	—	—	—	1	—	—
7	Rudy Lavik	1933–1937	42	13	26	3	0.345	8	15	2	0.360	—	—	—	0	—	—
8	Dixie Howell^{†}	1938–1941	42	23	15	4	0.595	11	11	2	0.500	0	1	1	0	—	—
9	Hilman Walker	1942	10	2	8	0	0.200	2	5	0	0.286	0	0	0	0	—	—
10	Steve Coutchie	1946	11	2	7	2	0.273	1	4	1	0.250	0	0	0	0	—	—
11	Ed Doherty	1947–1950	42	25	17	0	0.595	14	8	0	0.636	0	2	0	0	—	—
12	Larry Siemering	1951	10	6	3	1	0.650	4	1	0	0.800	0	0	0	0	—	—
13	Clyde B. Smith	1952–1954	29	15	13	1	0.534	8	4	0	0.667	0	0	0	1	—	—
14	Dan Devine^{†}	1955–1957	31	27	3	1	0.887	11	2	0	0.846	0	0	0	1	—	—
15	Frank Kush^{†}	1958–1979	231	176	54	1	0.764	92	25	0	0.786	6	1	0	9	—	AFCA Coach of the Year (1975); Walter Camp Coach of the Year Award (1975)
Int.	Bob Owens	1979	7	3	4	0	0.429	1	3	0	0.250	0	0	0	0	—	—
16	Darryl Rogers	1980–1984	56	37	18	1	0.670	21	14	1	0.597	1	0	0	0	—	—
17	John Cooper^{†}	1985–1987	36	25	9	2	0.722	13	6	2	0.667	2	1	0	1	—	Sporting News College Football COY (1986)
18	Larry Marmie	1988–1991	44	22	21	1	0.511	12	16	1	0.431	0	0	0	0	—	—
19	Bruce Snyder	1992–2000	103	58	45	0	0.563	40	32	0	0.556	1	3	0	1	—	AFCA Coach of the Year (1996); Eddie Robinson Coach of the Year (1996); George Munger Award (1996); Paul "Bear" Bryant Award (1996); Sporting News College Football COY (1996); Walter Camp Coach of the Year Award (1996)
20	Dirk Koetter	2001–2006	74	40	34	—	0.541	21	28	—	0.429	2	2	—	0	—	—
21	Dennis Erickson^{†}	2007–2011	62	31	31	—	0.500	21	24	—	0.467	0	2	—	1	—	—
22	Todd Graham	2012–2017	78	46	32	—	0.590	31	23	—	0.574	2	3	—	0	—	—
23	Herm Edwards	2018–2022	46	26	20	—	0.565	17	14	—	0.548	1	2	—	0	—	—
Int.	Shaun Aguano	2022	9	2	7	—	0.222	2	7	—	0.222	0	0	—	0	—	—
24	Kenny Dillingham	2023–present	39	22	17	—	0.564	15	12	—	0.556	0	2	—	1	—	—
