= List of Arizona State Sun Devils men's basketball seasons =

This is a list of seasons completed by the Arizona State Sun Devils men's college basketball team.

== Seasons ==
Record table
Season	Coach	Overall	Conference	Standing	Postseason
C.W. Adams (1911–1913)
1911–12	C.W. Adams	8–2	7–1		
1912–13	C.W. Adams	3–3	2–2		
G.W. Henry (1913–1914)
1913–14	G.W. Henry	6–5	5–3		
George Schaeffer (1914–1917)
1914–15	George Schaeffer	2–2	1–1		
1916–17	George Schaeffer	0–1	0–1		
George E. Cooper (1917–1922)
1917–18	George E. Cooper	14–4	12–4		
1918–19	George E. Cooper	3–4	3–3		
1919–20	George E. Cooper	5–3	4–2		
1920–21	George E. Cooper	11–3	8–2		
1921–22	George E. Cooper	10–1	9–1		
Ernest C. Wills (1922–1923)
1922–23	Ernest C. Wills	8–4	4–0	1st	
Aaron McCreary (1923–1930)
1923–24	Aaron McCreary	3–9	1–4	4th	
1924–25	Aaron McCreary	11–6	9–5	1st	
1925–26	Aaron McCreary	9–3	4–1	1st	
1926–27	Aaron McCreary	4–8			
1927–28	Aaron McCreary	10–5	7–1	1st	
1928–29	Aaron McCreary	5–12			
1929–30	Aaron McCreary	6–11	3–10	5th	
Ted Shipkey (1930–1931)
1930–31	Ted Shipkey	12–6	8–4	1st	
Ted Shipkey (Border Conference) (1931–1933)
1931–32	Ted Shipkey	7–12	4–8	5th	
1932–33	Ted Shipkey	13–12	7–9	5th	
Rudy Lavik (Border Conference) (1933–1935)
1933–34	Rudy Lavik	9–11	8–10	4th	
1934–35	Rudy Lavik	8–11	3–9	6th	
Earl Pomeroy (Border Conference) (1935–1939)
1935–36	Earl Pomeroy	12–14	11–7	2nd	
1936–37	Earl Pomeroy	8–12	7–11	6th	
1937–38	Earl Pomeroy	11–12	9–9	3rd	
1938–39	Earl Pomeroy	13–13	11–11	3rd	
Rudy Lavik (Border Conference) (1939–1948)
1939–40	Rudy Lavik	8–13	7–11	5th	
1940–41	Rudy Lavik	8–11	6–9	5th	
1941–42	Rudy Lavik	10–10	10–6	3rd	
1942–43	Rudy Lavik	10–9	6–6	5th	
1943–44	Rudy Lavik	12–2			
1944–45	Rudy Lavik	5–9	3–5	4th	
1945–46	Rudy Lavik	12–16	6–8	5th	
1946–47	Rudy Lavik	7–13	6–11	7th	
1947–48	Rudy Lavik	13–11	9–7	3rd	NAIA Second Round
Bill Kajikawa (Border Conference) (1948–1957)
1948–49	Bill Kajikawa	12–17	4–12	9th	
1949–50	Bill Kajikawa	12–14	10–6	4th	
1950–51	Bill Kajikawa	9–16	6–10	7th	
1951–52	Bill Kajikawa	8–16	6–8	T–4th	
1952–53	Bill Kajikawa	13–12	10–4	T–2nd	NAIA Second Round
1953–54	Bill Kajikawa	5–18	3–9	T–6th	
1954–55	Bill Kajikawa	10–14	8–4	T–3rd	
1955–56	Bill Kajikawa	10–16	5–7	6th	
1956–57	Bill Kajikawa	10–15	4–6	4th	
Ned Wulk (Border Conference) (1957–1962)
1957–58	Ned Wulk	13–13	8–2	1st	NCAA University Division First Round
1958–59	Ned Wulk	17–9	7–3	T–1st	
1959–60	Ned Wulk	16–7	7–3	T–2nd	
1960–61	Ned Wulk	23–6	9–1	T–1st	NCAA University Division Elite Eight
1961–62	Ned Wulk	23–4	10–0	1st	NCAA University Division First Round
Ned Wulk (Western Athletic Conference) (1962–1978)
1962–63	Ned Wulk	26–3	9–1	1st	NCAA University Division Elite Eight
1963–64	Ned Wulk	16–11	7–3	T–1st	NCAA University Division First Round
1964–65	Ned Wulk	13–14	4–6	5th	
1965–66	Ned Wulk	12–14	3–7	6th	
1966–67	Ned Wulk	5–21	1–9	6th	
1967–68	Ned Wulk	11–17	4–6	T–4th	
1968–69	Ned Wulk	11–15	4–6	T–5th	
1969–70	Ned Wulk	4–22	2–12	8th	
1970–71	Ned Wulk	16–10	8–6	4th	
1971–72	Ned Wulk	18–8	9–5	T–2nd	
1972–73	Ned Wulk	19–9	10–4	1st	NCAA University Division Sweet Sixteen
1973–74	Ned Wulk	18–9	9–5	T–2nd	NCIT First Round
1974–75	Ned Wulk	25–4	12–2	T–1st	NCAA Division I Elite Eight
1975–76	Ned Wulk	17–10	5–9	T–6th	
1976–77	Ned Wulk	15–13	6–8	5th	
1977–78	Ned Wulk	13–14	6–8	T–4th	
Ned Wulk (Pac-10 Conference) (1978–1982)
1978–79	Ned Wulk	16–14	7–11	T–6th	
1979–80	Ned Wulk	22–7	15–3	2nd	NCAA Division I Second Round
1980–81	Ned Wulk	24–4	16–2	2nd	NCAA Division I First Round
1981–82	Ned Wulk	13–14	8–10	T–6th	
Bob Weinhauer (Pac-10 Conference) (1982–1985)
1982–83	Bob Weinhauer	19–14	12–6	T–3rd	NIT Second Round
1983–84	Bob Weinhauer	13–15	8–10	T–5th	
1984–85	Bob Weinhauer	12–16	7–11	7th	
Steve Patterson (Pac-10 Conference) (1985–1989)
1985–86	Steve Patterson	14–14	8–10	T–5th	
1986–87	Steve Patterson	11–17	6–12	8th	
1987–88	Steve Patterson	13–16	6–12	7th	
1988–89	Steve Patterson; Bob Schermerhorn	12–16	5–13	7th	
Bill Frieder (Pac-10 Conference) (1989–1997)
1989–90	Bill Frieder	15–16	6–12	T–7th	NIT First Round
1990–91	Bill Frieder	20–10	10–8	T–3rd	NCAA Division I Second Round
1991–92	Bill Frieder	19–14	9–9	T–5th	NIT Second Round
1992–93	Bill Frieder	18–10	11–7	T–3rd	NIT First Round
1993–94	Bill Frieder	15–13	10–8	T–4th	NIT First Round
1994–95	Bill Frieder	24–9	12–6	3rd	NCAA Division I Sweet Sixteen
1995–96	Bill Frieder	11–16	6–12	8th	
1996–97	Bill Frieder	10–20	2-16	5th	
Don Newman (Pac-10 Conference) (1997–1998)
1997–98	Don Newman	18–14	8–10	T–5th	NIT First Round
Rob Evans (Pac-10 Conference) (1998–2006)
1998–99	Rob Evans	14–16	6–12	9th	
1999–00	Rob Evans	19–13	10–8	T–4th	NIT Second Round
2000–01	Rob Evans	13–16	5–13	T–6th	
2001–02	Rob Evans	12–14	7–11	7th	NIT First Round
2002–03	Rob Evans	19–11	11–7	4th	NCAA Division I Second Round
2003–04	Rob Evans	10–17	4–14	10th	
2004–05	Rob Evans	18–13	7–11	6th	NIT First Round
2005–06	Rob Evans	11–17	5–13	9th	
Herb Sendek (Pac-10/12 Conference) (2006–2015)
2006–07	Herb Sendek	8–22	2–16	10th	
2007–08	Herb Sendek	21–12	9–9	5th	NIT Quarterfinal
2008–09	Herb Sendek	25–10	11–7	3rd	NCAA Division I Second Round
2009–10	Herb Sendek	22–11	12–6	2nd	NIT First Round
2010–11	Herb Sendek	12–19	4–14	10th	
2011–12	Herb Sendek	10–21	6–12	10th	
2012–13	Herb Sendek	21–12	9–9	6th	NIT Second Round
2013–14	Herb Sendek	21–12	10–8	3rd	NCAA Division I First Round
2014–15	Herb Sendek	18–16	9–9	T–5th	NIT Second Round
Bobby Hurley (Pac-12 Conference) (2015–2024)
2015–16	Bobby Hurley	15–17	5–13	11th	
2016–17	Bobby Hurley	15–18	7–11	8th	
2017–18	Bobby Hurley	20–10	8–10	9th	NCAA Division I First Four
2018–19	Bobby Hurley	23–11	12–6	2nd	NCAA Division I First Round
2019–20	Bobby Hurley	20–11	11–7	3rd	No postseason held
2020–21	Bobby Hurley	11–14	7–10	9th	
2021–22	Bobby Hurley	14–17	10–10	8th	
2022–23	Bobby Hurley	23–13	11–9	5th	NCAA Division I First Round
2023–24	Bobby Hurley	14–18	8–12	T–10th	
Bobby Hurley (Big 12 Conference) (2024–2026)
2024–25	Bobby Hurley	13–20	4–16	15th	Crown First Round
2025–26	Bobby Hurley	17–16	7–11	T–11th	
Total:		1,460–1,312 (.527)			
National champion Postseason invitational champion Conference regular season champion Conference regular season and conference tournament champion Division regular season champion Division regular season and conference tournament champion Conference tournament champion
