= List of Arizona State Sun Devils men's basketball head coaches =

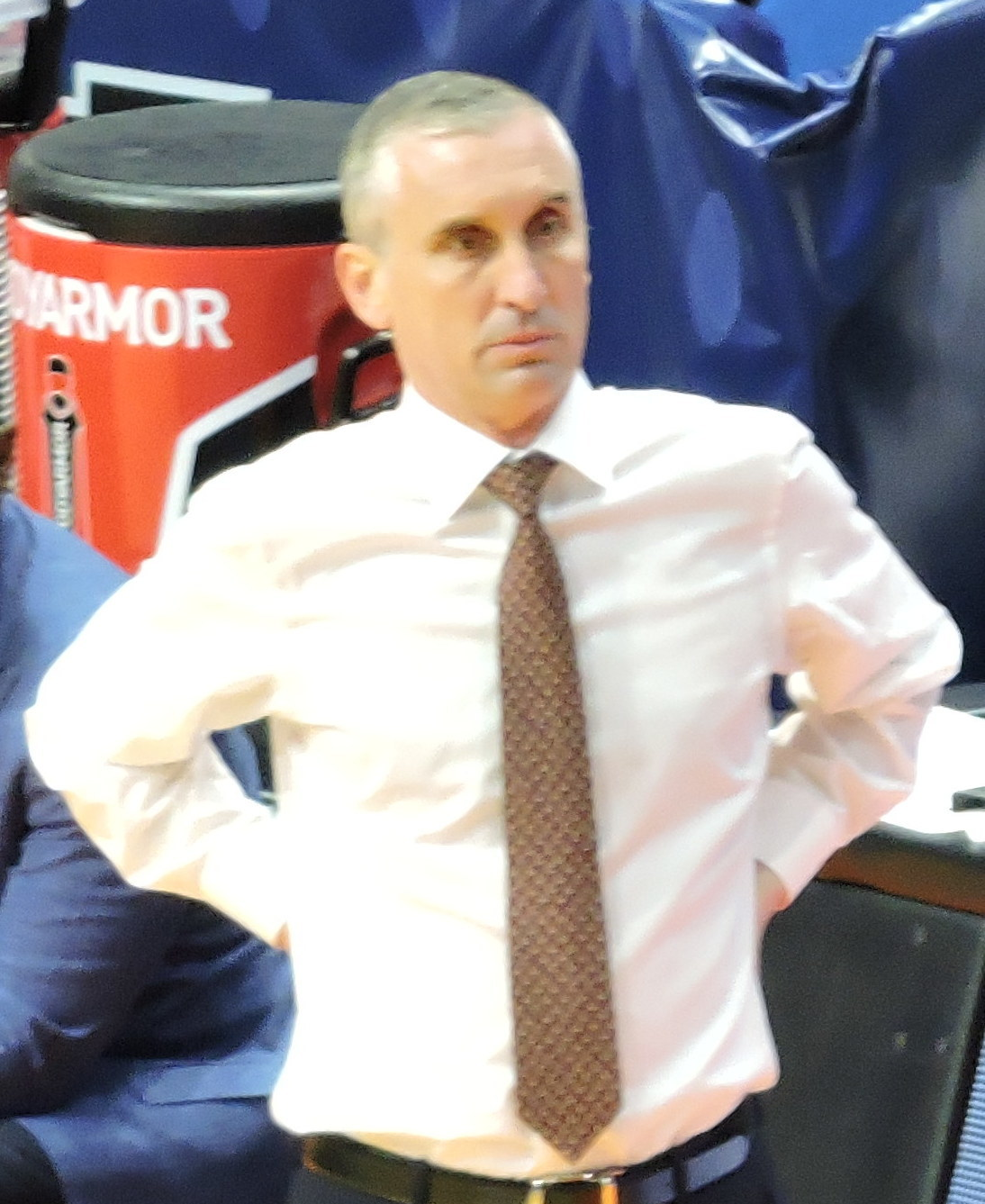
Bobby Hurley, the previous head coach of the Arizona State Sun Devils.

The following is a list of Arizona State Sun Devils men's basketball head coaches. The Sun Devils have had 19 head coaches in their 113-season history.

Arizona State's current head coach is Vacant.

No.	Tenure	Coach	Years	Record	Pct.
1	1911–1913	C. W. Adams	2	11–5	.688
2	1913–1914	G. W. Henry	1	6–5	.545
3	1914–1915; 1916–1917	George Schaeffer	2	2–3	.400
4	1917–1922	George E. Cooper	5	43–15	.741
5	1922–1923	Ernest C. Wells	1	8–4	.667
6	1923–1930	Aaron McCreary	7	48–54	.471
7	1930–1933	Ted Shipkey	3	32–30	.516
8	1933–1935; 1939–1948	Rudy Lavik	11	102–116	.468
9	1935–1939	Earl Pomeroy	4	44–51	.463
10	1948–1957	Bill Kajikawa	9	88–137	.391
11	1957–1982	Ned Wulk	25	406–272	.599
12	1982–1985	Bob Weinhauer	3	44–45	.494
13	1985–1989 (Note: Steve Patterson resigned as head coach on February 4, 1989. Bob Schermerhorn served as interim coach for the remainder of the season.)	Steve Patterson	4	48–56	.462
–	1989*	Bob Schermerhorn	1	2–7	.222
14	1989–1997 (Note: Bill Frieder resigned as head coach prior to the 1997–98 season. Don Newman served as interim coach to replace him.)	Bill Frieder	8	130–107	.549
–	1997–1998*	Don Newman	1	18–14	.563
15	1998–2006	Rob Evans	8	119–120	.498
16	2006–2015	Herb Sendek	9	159–137	.537
17	2015–2026	Bobby Hurley	11	185–167	.526
Totals		19 coaches	114 seasons	1,464–1,310	.528
Records updated through end of 2024–25 season * - Denotes interim head coach. Source
