= List of New Mexico State Aggies football seasons =

The following is a complete list of the New Mexico State Aggies football seasons. As of 2025, The Aggies currently compete in Conference USA and have an overall record of 462–688–30 in 129 seasons. In addition they have appeared in 6 bowl games with a record of 4–1–1.

== Seasons ==
Year	Team	Overall	Conference	Standing	Bowl/playoffs	Coaches^{#}	AP^{°}
W. M. Clutte (Independent) (1893)
1893	New Mexico A&M	1–1					
W. M. Clutte:		1–1					
Alfred Holt (Independent) (1894)
1894	New Mexico A&M	2–0					
Alfred Holt:		2–0					
No Coach (Independent) (1895–1896)
1895	New Mexico A&M	1–1					
1896	New Mexico A&M	0–2					
No Coach:		1–3					
Charles M. Barber (Independent) (1895–1896)
1897	New Mexico A&M	1–0–1					
1898	New Mexico A&M	2–1					
Charles M. Barber:		3–1–1					
John O. Miller (Independent) (1899)
1899	New Mexico A&M	1–0					
William A. Sutherland (Independent) (1900)
1900	New Mexico A&M	3–3–1					
William A. Sutherland:		3–3–1					
John O. Miller (Independent) (1901–1907)
1901	New Mexico A&M	2–1					
1902	New Mexico A&M	0–1–2					
1903	New Mexico A&M	2–0–1					
1904	New Mexico A&M	1–2–1					
1905	New Mexico A&M	3–0					
1906	New Mexico A&M	4–0					
1907	New Mexico A&M	3–0					
John O. Miller:		16–4–4					
William G. Hummell (Independent) (1908)
1908	New Mexico A&M	4–2					
William G. Hummell:		4–2					
J. H. Squires (Independent) (1909)
1909	New Mexico A&M	1–3–1					
J. H. Squires:		1–3–1					
Art Badenoch (Independent) (1910–1913)
1910	New Mexico A&M	3–2					
1911	New Mexico A&M	7–0					
1912	New Mexico A&M	5–1					
1913	New Mexico A&M	7–0–1					
Art Badenoch:		22–3–1					
Clarence W. Russell (Independent) (1914–1916)
1914	New Mexico A&M	4–2–1					
1915	New Mexico A&M	5–2					
1916	New Mexico A&M	2–4–1					
Clarence W. Russell:		11–8–2					
John G. Griffith (Independent) (1917)
1917	New Mexico A&M	4–2					
John G. Griffith:		4–2					
Anthony Savage (Independent) (1919)
1919	New Mexico A&M	2–3–1					
Anthony Savage:		2–3–1					
Dutch Bergman (Independent) (1920–1922)
1920	New Mexico A&M	5–1–1					
1921	New Mexico A&M	4–2					
1922	New Mexico A&M	6–2					
Dutch Bergman:		15–5–1					
R. R. Brown (Independent) (1923–1925)
1923	New Mexico A&M	9–0					
1924	New Mexico A&M	7–3					
1925	New Mexico A&M	5–3–1					
R. R. Brown:		21–6–1					
Arthur Burkholder (Independent) (1926)
1926	New Mexico A&M	5–3–1					
Arthur Burkholder:		5–3–1					
Ted Coffman (Independent) (1927–1928)
1927	New Mexico A&M	3–5					
1928	New Mexico A&M	4–5					
Ted Coffman:		8–10					
Jerry Hines (Independent/Border Conference) (1929–1939)
1929	New Mexico A&M	3–2–3					
1930	New Mexico A&M	5–3					
1931	New Mexico A&M	6–4	1–2	5th			
1932	New Mexico A&M	4–5–1	1–2–1	5th			
1933	New Mexico A&M	2–6	0–4	6th			
1934	New Mexico A&M	4–1–3	0–1–3	5th			
1935	New Mexico A&M	7–1–2	4–1	2nd	T Sun		
1936	New Mexico A&M	6–4–1	3–2	3rd			
1937	New Mexico A&M	7–2	4–1	2nd			
1938	New Mexico A&M	7–2	4–1	T–1st			
1939	New Mexico A&M	3–6	1–4	6th			
Jerry Hines:		54–36–10	18–18–4				
Julius H. Johnston (Border Conference) (1940–1942)
1940	New Mexico A&M	3–6	1–4	5th			
1941	New Mexico A&M	2–7	0–6	9th			
1942	New Mexico A&M	1–8	0–6	9th			
Julius H. Johnston:		6–21	1–16				
Maurice Moulder (Border Conference) (1943)
1943	New Mexico A&M	4–0	0–0	NA			
Maurice Moulder:		4–0	0–0				
Raymond A. Curfman (Border Conference) (1946–1947)
1946	New Mexico A&M	5–5	1–4	9th			
1947	New Mexico A&M	3–6	1–4	8th			
Raymond A. Curfman:		8–11	2–8				
Vaughn Corley (Border Conference) (1948–1950)
1948	New Mexico A&M	3–7	0–4	9th			
1949	New Mexico A&M	4–6	1–4	7th			
1950	New Mexico A&M	2–7	1–4	8th			
Vaughn Corley:		9–20	2–12				
Joseph T. Coleman (Border Conference) (1951–1952)
1951	New Mexico A&M	1–9	1–4	6th			
1952	New Mexico A&M	2–6–1	1–2–1	6th			
Joseph T. Coleman:		3–15–1	2–6–1				
James Patton (Border Conference) (1953–1954)
1953	New Mexico A&M	2–7	1–4	6th			
1954	New Mexico A&M	0–9	0–4	7th			
James Patton:		2–16	1–8				
Tony Cavallo (Border Conference) (1955–1957)
1955	New Mexico A&M	3–7	0–4	7th			
1956	New Mexico A&M	1–9	0–4	6th			
1957	New Mexico A&M	3–7	0–4	T–5th			
Tony Cavallo:		7–23	0–12				
Warren B. Woodson (Border Conference/Independent) (1958–1967)
1958	New Mexico A&M	4–6	1–3	4th			
1959	New Mexico A&M	8–3	2–2	T–3rd	W Sun		
1960	New Mexico State	11–0	4–0	1st	W Sun	19	17
1961	New Mexico State	5–4–1	2–1	3rd			
1962	New Mexico State	4–6					
1963	New Mexico State	3–6–1					
1964	New Mexico State	6–4					
1965	New Mexico State	8–2					
1966	New Mexico State	7–3					
1967	New Mexico State	7–2–1					
Warren B. Woodson:		63–36–3	9–6				
Jim Wood (Independent/Missouri Valley Conference) (1968–1972)
1968	New Mexico State	5–5					
1969	New Mexico State	5–5					
1970	New Mexico State	4–6					
1971	New Mexico State	5–5–1	4–0 (Note: Not eligible for conference championship.)	1st			
1972	New Mexico State	2–9	1–3	7th			
Jim Wood:		21–30–1	1–3				
Jim Bradley (Missouri Valley Conference) (1973–1977)
1973	New Mexico State	5–6	3–2	T–3rd			
1974	New Mexico State	5–6	2–3	5th			
1975	New Mexico State	5–6	2–2	T–2nd			
1976	New Mexico State	4–6–1	2–1–1	T–1st			
1977	New Mexico State	4–7	3–2	3rd			
Jim Bradley:		23–31–1	12–10–1				
Gil Krueger (Missouri Valley Conference) (1978–1982)
1978	New Mexico State	6–5	5–1	1st			
1979	New Mexico State	2–9	1–5	T–6th			
1980	New Mexico State	3–7–1	1–4–1	6th			
1981	New Mexico State	3–8	1–5	7th			
1982	New Mexico State	3–8	1–4	T–6th			
Gil Krueger:		17–37–1	9–19–1				
Fred Zechman (Missouri Valley Conference/Big West Conference) (1983–1985)
1983	New Mexico State	5–6	3–2	3rd			
1984	New Mexico State	3–8	1–5	8th			
1985	New Mexico State	1–10	0–7	8th			
Fred Zechman:		9–24	4–14				
Mike Knoll (Big West Conference) (1986–1989)
1986	New Mexico State	1–10	1–6	8th			
1987	New Mexico State	2–9	0–7	8th			
1988	New Mexico State	1–10	0–7	8th			
1989	New Mexico State	0–11	0–7	8th			
Mike Knoll:		4–40	1–27				
Jim Hess (Big West Conference) (1990–1996)
1990	New Mexico State	1–10	1–6	7th			
1991	New Mexico State	2–9	2–5	7th			
1992	New Mexico State	6–5	3–3	T–4th			
1993	New Mexico State	5–6	4–3	4th			
1994	New Mexico State	3–8	2–5	8th			
1995	New Mexico State	4–7	3–4	T–6th			
1996	New Mexico State	1–10	0–5	6th			
Jim Hess:		22–55	15–32				
Tony Samuel (Big West Conference/Sun Belt Conference) (1997–2004)
1997	New Mexico State	2–9	0–5	6th			
1998	New Mexico State	3–8	1–4	6th			
1999	New Mexico State	6–5	3–2	3rd			
2000	New Mexico State	3–8	1–4	4th			
2001	New Mexico State	5–7	4–2	3rd			
2002	New Mexico State	7–5	5–1	2nd			
2003	New Mexico State	3–9	2–5	7th			
2004	New Mexico State	5–6	4–3	T–3rd			
Tony Samuel:		34–57	20–26				
Hal Mumme (Western Athletic Conference) (2005–2008)
2005	New Mexico State	0–12	0–8	9th			
2006	New Mexico State	4–8	2–6	7th			
2007	New Mexico State	4–9	1–7	8th			
2008	New Mexico State	3–9	1–7	T–8th			
Hal Mumme:		11–38	4–28				
DeWayne Walker (Western Athletic Conference) (2009–2012)
2009	New Mexico State	3–10	1–7	T–8th			
2010	New Mexico State	2–10	1–7	8th			
2011	New Mexico State	4–9	2–5	7th			
2012	New Mexico State	1–11	0–6	7th			
DeWayne Walker:		10–40	4–25				
Doug Martin (Division I FBS Independent/Sun Belt Conference) (2013–2021)
2013	New Mexico State	2–10					
2014	New Mexico State	2–10	1–7	T–9th			
2015	New Mexico State	3–9	3–5	T–5th			
2016	New Mexico State	3–9	2–6	T–8th			
2017	New Mexico State	7–6	4–4	T–5th	W Arizona		
2018	New Mexico State	3–9	–	–			
2019	New Mexico State	2–10	–	–			
2020	New Mexico State	1–1	–	–			
2021	New Mexico State	2–10	–	–			
Doug Martin:		25–74	10–22				
Jerry Kill (Division I FBS Independent/Conference USA) (2022–2023)
2022	New Mexico State	7–6	–	–	W Quick Lane		
2023	New Mexico State	10–5	7–1	2nd	L Isleta New Mexico		
Jerry Kill:		17–11	7–1				
Tony Sanchez (Conference USA) (2024–present)
2024	New Mexico State	3–9	2–6	T–8th			
2025	New Mexico State	4–8	2–6	T–9th			
Tony Sanchez:		7–17	4–12				
Total:		462–688–30					
National championship Conference title Conference division title or championship game berth
^{†}Indicates Bowl Coalition, Bowl Alliance, BCS, or CFP / New Years' Six bowl.; ^{#}Rankings from final Coaches Poll.; ^{°}Rankings from final AP Poll.

Notes
