= List of Texas Tech Red Raiders football seasons =

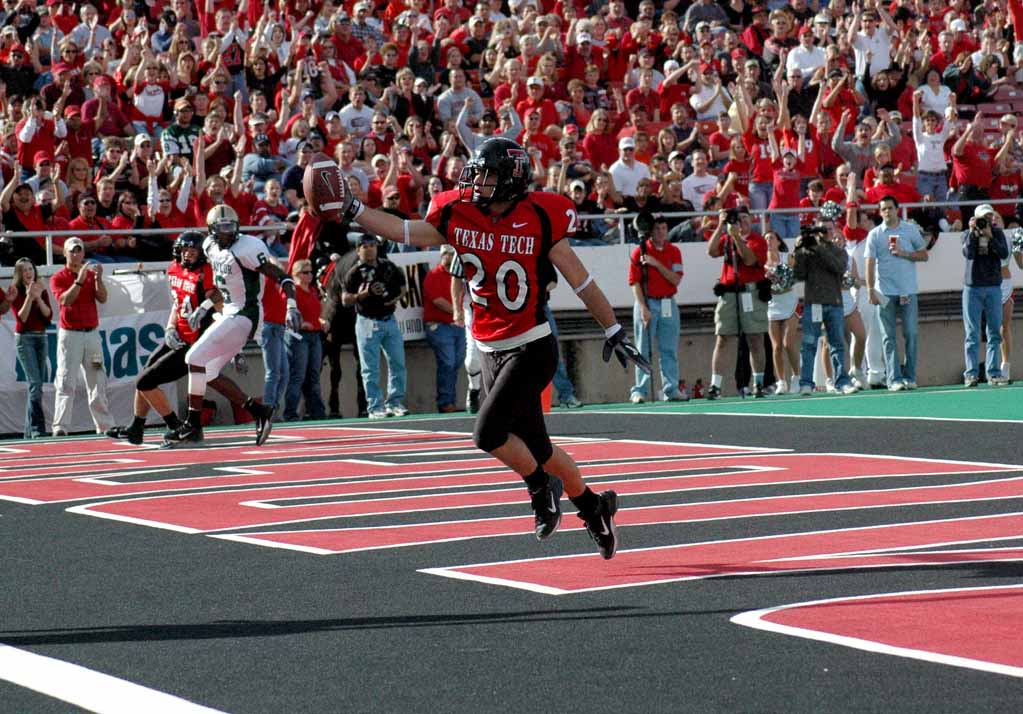
Danny Amendola scores a touchdown in the 2004 game against the Baylor Bears

The Texas Tech Red Raiders college football team competes in the NCAA Division I Football Bowl Subdivision (formerly known as Division I-A), representing Texas Tech University in the Big 12 Conference. Texas Tech has played its home games at Galaxy Stadium in Lubbock, Texas since 1947.

Texas Tech (then known as Texas Technological College) fielded its first intercollegiate football team during the 1925 season. The team was known as the "Matadors" from 1925 to 1936, a name suggested by the wife of E. Y. Freeland, the first football coach, to reflect the influence of the Spanish Renaissance architecture on campus. In 1932, Texas Tech joined the Border Intercollegiate Athletic Association, also known as the Border Conference. The school's short-lived Matadors moniker was replaced officially in 1937 with "Red Raiders", a nickname bestowed upon them by a sportswriter impressed by their bright scarlet uniforms that remains to this today. That same year, the team won its first conference championship and was invited to the Sun Bowl. The game was played on January 1, 1938, and resulted in a 7–6 loss to the West Virginia Mountaineers. Texas Tech suffered four more bowl losses before their first postseason win in the 1952 Sun Bowl. Before withdrawing from the Border Conference in 1956, the Red Raiders won nine conference championships, the most held by a Border Conference member.

In 1956, Texas Tech was admitted to the Southwest Conference (SWC) but was ineligible for any title during a four-year probationary period. It gained full SWC membership and began official conference play in 1960. The Red Raiders won conference championships in 1976 and 1994. The team remained in the SWC until the conference dissolved in 1996. The university was invited and became a charter member in the South Division of the Big 12 Conference.

This is a list of their annual results.

== Seasons ==
Year	Coach	Overall	Conference	Standing	Bowl/playoffs	Coaches^{#}	AP^{°}
Ewing Y. Freeland (Independent) (1925–1928)
1925	Ewing Y. Freeland	6–1–2					
1926	Ewing Y. Freeland	6–1–3					
1927	Ewing Y. Freeland	5–4					
1928	Ewing Y. Freeland	4–4–1					
Grady Higginbotham (Independent) (1929)
1929	Grady Higginbotham	1–7–2					
Pete Cawthon (Independent) (1930–1931)
1930	Pete Cawthon	3–6					
1931	Pete Cawthon	6–3					
Pete Cawthon (Border Conference) (1932–1940)
1932	Pete Cawthon	10–2	2–0	1st (Note: Although Texas Tech went undefeated in conference play, Border Intercollegiate Athletic Association rules forbade an official conference championship being awarded to a team without a minimum of three games played between conference members.)			
1933	Pete Cawthon	8–1	1–0	1st			
1934	Pete Cawthon	7–2–1	1–0	1st			
1935	Pete Cawthon	5–3–2	0–1	6th			
1936	Pete Cawthon	5–4–1	0–0	7th			
1937	Pete Cawthon	8–4	3–0	1st	L Sun		
1938	Pete Cawthon	10–1	2–0	1st	L Cotton		11
1939	Pete Cawthon	5–5–1	2–1	3rd			
1940	Pete Cawthon	9–1–1	0–1	6th			
Dell Morgan (Border Conference) (1941–1950)
1941	Dell Morgan	9–2	2–0	1st	L Sun		
1942	Dell Morgan	4–5–1	3–0–1	T–1st			
1943	Dell Morgan	4–6	0–0	N/A			
1944	Dell Morgan	4–7	2–0	1st			
1945	Dell Morgan	3–5–2	1–0–1	T–1st			
1946	Dell Morgan	8–3	3–1	2nd			
1947	Dell Morgan	6–5	4–0	1st	L Sun		
1948	Dell Morgan	7–3	5–0	1st			
1949	Dell Morgan	7–5	5–0	1st	L Raisin		
1950	Dell Morgan	3–8	3–2	4th			
DeWitt Weaver (Border Conference) (1951–1956)
1951	DeWitt Weaver	7–4	5–0	1st	W Sun		
1952	DeWitt Weaver	3–7–1	2–1–1	2nd			
1953	DeWitt Weaver	11–1	5–0	1st	W Gator	12	12
1954	DeWitt Weaver	7–2–1	4–0	1st			
1955	DeWitt Weaver	7–3–1	3–0–1	1st	L Sun		
1956	DeWitt Weaver	2–7–1	1–3	N/A			
DeWitt Weaver (Independent) (1957–1959)
1957	DeWitt Weaver	2–8					
1958	DeWitt Weaver	3–7					
1959	DeWitt Weaver	4–6					
DeWitt Weaver (Southwest Conference) (1960)
1960	DeWitt Weaver	3–6–1	1–5–1	6th			
J. T. King (Southwest Conference) (1961–1969)
1961	J. T. King	4–6	2–5	T–8th			
1962	J. T. King	1–9	0–7	8th			
1963	J. T. King	5–5	2–5	T–6th			
1964	J. T. King	6–4–1	3–3–1	T–4th	L Sun		
1965	J. T. King	8–3	5–3	T–2nd	L Gator	10	
1966	J. T. King	4–6	2–5	T–6th			
1967	J. T. King	6–4	5–2	2nd			
1968	J. T. King	5–3–2	4–3	4th			
1969	J. T. King	5–5	4–3	T–6th			
Jim Carlen (Southwest Conference) (1970–1974)
1970	Jim Carlen	8–4	5–2	3rd			
1971	Jim Carlen	4–7	2–5	5th			
1972	Jim Carlen	8–4	4–3	T–2nd	L Sun		
1973	Jim Carlen	11–1	6–1	2nd	W Gator	11	11
1974	Jim Carlen	6–4–2	3–4	6th	T Peach		
Steve Sloan (Southwest Conference) (1975–1977)
1975	Steve Sloan	6–5	4–3	4th			
1976	Steve Sloan	10–2	6–1	T–1st	L Bluebonnet	13	13
1977	Steve Sloan	7–5	4–4	T–4th	L Tangerine		
Rex Dockery (Southwest Conference) (1978–1980)
1978	Rex Dockery	7–4	5–3	4th			
1979	Rex Dockery	3–6–2	2–5–1	7th			
1980	Rex Dockery	5–6	3–5	T–6th			
Jerry Moore (Southwest Conference) (1981–1985)
1981	Jerry Moore	1–9–1	0–7–1	9th			
1982	Jerry Moore	4–7	3–5	T–6th			
1983	Jerry Moore	3–7–1	3–4–1	T–5th			
1984	Jerry Moore	4–7	2–6	8th			
1985	Jerry Moore	4–7	1–7	8th			
David McWilliams (Southwest Conference) (1986)
1986	David McWilliams (Note: McWilliams then spent the 1986 season as head coach at Texas Tech, leading the Red Raiders to a bowl bid, before accepting the head coach position of Texas. The team was coached in the bowl game by Spike Dykes.)	7–5	5–3	T–4th	L Independence		
Spike Dykes (Southwest Conference) (1986–1995)
1987	Spike Dykes	6–4–1	3–3–1	4th			
1988	Spike Dykes	5–6	4–3	4th			
1989	Spike Dykes	9–3	5–3	4th	W All-American	16	19
1990	Spike Dykes	4–7	3–5	T–5th			
1991	Spike Dykes	6–5	5–3	T–2nd			
1992	Spike Dykes	5–6	4–3	T–2nd			
1993	Spike Dykes	6–6	5–2	T–2nd	L John Hancock		
1994	Spike Dykes	6–6	4–3	T–1st	L Cotton		
1995	Spike Dykes	9–3	5–2	T–2nd	W Copper	20	23
Spike Dykes (Big 12 Conference) (1996–1999)
1996	Spike Dykes	7–5	5–3	2nd (South)	L Alamo		
1997	Spike Dykes	6–5	5–3	T–2nd (South)			
1998	Spike Dykes	7–5	4–4	3rd (South)	L Independence		
1999	Spike Dykes	6–5	5–3	T–2nd (South)			
Mike Leach (Big 12 Conference) (2000–2009)
2000	Mike Leach	7–6	3–5	4th (South)	L Galleryfurniture.com		
2001	Mike Leach	7–5	4–4	T–3rd (South)	L Alamo		
2002	Mike Leach	9–5	5–3	T–3rd (South)	W Tangerine		
2003	Mike Leach	8–5	4–4	4th (South)	W Houston		
2004	Mike Leach	8–4	5–3	T–3rd (South)	W Holiday	17	18
2005	Mike Leach	9–3	6–2	T–2nd (South)	L Cotton	19	20
2006	Mike Leach	8–5	4–4	4th (South)	W Insight		
2007	Mike Leach	9–4	4–4	T–3rd (South)	W Gator	23	22
2008	Mike Leach	11–2	7–1	T–1st (South)	L Cotton	12	12
2009	Mike Leach (Note: On December 28, Leach was suspended by Texas Tech pending investigation of alleged inappropriate treatment of Adam James, a redshirt sophomore wide receiver. Leach was terminated by the university on December 30. Ruffin McNeill, the team's defensive coordinator, was named interim head coach and led the team during their appearance in the Alamo Bowl.)	9–4	5–3	T–3rd (South)	W Alamo	23	21
Tommy Tuberville (Big 12 Conference) (2010–2012)
2010	Tommy Tuberville	8–5	3–5	5th (South)	W TicketCity		
2011	Tommy Tuberville	5–7	2–7	9th			
2012	Tommy Tuberville (Note: At the end of the regular season, Tuberville resigned to take the same position at Cincinnati. Offensive line coach Chris Thomsen served as interim head coach for the team's bowl game.)	8–5	4–5	T–5th	W Texas		
Kliff Kingsbury (Big 12 Conference) (2013–2018)
2013	Kliff Kingsbury	8–5	4–5	6th	W Holiday		
2014	Kliff Kingsbury	4–8	2–7	8th			
2015	Kliff Kingsbury	7–6	4–5	T–5th	L Texas		
2016	Kliff Kingsbury	5–7	3–6	T–6th			
2017	Kliff Kingsbury	6–7	3–6	7th	L Birmingham		
2018	Kliff Kingsbury	5–7	3–6	T–7th			
Matt Wells (Big 12 Conference) (2019–2021)
2019	Matt Wells	4–8	2–7	9th			
2020	Matt Wells	4–6	3–6	8th			
2021	Matt Wells (Note: The team was led by third-year head coach Matt Wells for the first eight games. Wells was fired on October 25, with offensive coordinator Sonny Cumbie being named interim head coach. Baylor associate head coach/outside linebackers coach Joey McGuire was named as Texas Tech's 17th head coach on November 8; Cumbie continued to serve as interim head coach for the remainder of the season.)	7–6	3–6	T–7th	W Liberty		
Joey McGuire (Big 12 Conference) (2022–present)
2022	Joey McGuire	8–5	5–4	4th	W Texas		
2023	Joey McGuire	7–6	5–4	T-7th	W Independence		
2024	Joey McGuire	8–5	6–3	T-2nd	L Liberty		
2025	Joey McGuire	12–2	8–1	1st	L Orange^{†} (CFP Quarterfinal)	7	7
Total:		605–486–32					
National championship Conference title Conference division title or championship game berth
^{†}Indicates Bowl Coalition, Bowl Alliance, BCS, or CFP / New Years' Six bowl.; ^{#}Rankings from final Coaches Poll.
