= 1934 New Mexico Lobos football team =

American college football season

1934 New Mexico Lobos football
- Conference: Border Conference
- Record: 8–1 (3–1 Border)
- Head coach: Gwinn Henry (1st season)
- Captain: Guyton Hays
- Home stadium: University Field

1934 Border Conference football standings
| | Conf. | | | | | Overall |
| Team | W | | L | | T | W | | L | | T |
|---|---|---|---|---|---|---|---|---|---|---|
| Texas Tech | 1 | – | 0 | – | 0 | 7 | – | 2 | – | 1 |
| New Mexico | 3 | – | 1 | – | 0 | 8 | – | 1 | – | 0 |
| Arizona | 2 | – | 1 | – | 1 | 7 | – | 2 | – | 1 |
| Arizona State | 2 | – | 2 | – | 1 | 4 | – | 3 | – | 1 |
| New Mexico A&M | 0 | – | 1 | – | 3 | 4 | – | 1 | – | 3 |
| Arizona State–Flagstaff | 0 | – | 3 | – | 1 | 1 | – | 5 | – | 1 |

The 1934 New Mexico Lobos football team represented the University of New Mexico as a member of the Border Conference during the 1934 college football season. In their first season under head coach Gwinn Henry, the Lobos compiled an overall record of 8–1 record with a mark of 3–1 against conference opponents, placing second in the Border Conference, and outscored all opponents by a total of 251 to 73. Guyton Hays was the team captain.

== Schedule ==
| Date | Opponent | Site | Result | Attendance | Source |
|---|---|---|---|---|---|
| September 29 | New Mexico Normal* | University Field; Albuquerque, NM | W 76–7 | | |
| October 6 | Arizona State–Flagstaff | University Field; Albuquerque, NM | W 33–6 | 4,000 | |
| October 13 | at Texas Mines* | Kidd Field; El Paso, TX | W 21–15 | 3,500 | |
| October 20 | at Arizona State | Irish Field; Tempe, AZ | W 18–12 | | |
| October 27 | New Mexico Military* | University Field; Albuquerque, NM | W 26–7 | | |
| November 3 | at Arizona | Arizona Stadium; Tucson, AZ (rivalry) | L 6–14 | | |
| November 12 | Silver City Teachers* | University Field; Albuquerque, NM | W 26–0 | 4,000 | |
| November 17 | New Mexico A&M^{†} | University Field; Albuquerque, NM (rivalry) | W 12–6 | 4,500 | |
| November 29 | Colorado College* | University Field; Albuquerque, NM | W 33–6 | 3,900 | |
*Non-conference game; ^{†}Homecoming
