= 1934 Arizona State–Flagstaff Lumberjacks football team =

American college football season

1934 Arizona State–Flagstaff Lumberjacks football
- Conference: Border Conference
- Record: 1–5–1 (0–3–1 Border)
- Head coach: Ira MacIntosh (2nd season)
- Home stadium: Skidmore Field

1934 Border Conference football standings
	Conf.					Overall
Team	W		L		T	W		L		T
Texas Tech	1	–	0	–	0	7	–	2	–	1
New Mexico	3	–	1	–	0	8	–	1	–	0
Arizona	2	–	1	–	1	7	–	2	–	1
Arizona State	2	–	2	–	1	4	–	3	–	1
New Mexico A&M	0	–	1	–	3	4	–	1	–	3
Arizona State–Flagstaff	0	–	3	–	1	1	–	5	–	1

The 1934 Arizona State–Flagstaff Lumberjacks football team represented the Arizona State Teachers College at Flagstaff (now known as Northern Arizona University) as a member of the Border Conference during the 1934 college football season. Led by second-year head coach Ira MacIntosh, the Lumberjacks compiled an overall record of 1–5–1, with a mark of 0–3–1 in conference play, and finished sixth in the Border.

== Schedule ==
Date	Opponent	Site	Result	Attendance	Source
September 29	Whittier*	Skidmore Field; Flagstaff, AZ	L 6–7		
October 6	at New Mexico	University Field; Albuquerque, NM	L 6–33	4,000	
October 13	Fresno State*	Skidmore Field; Flagstaff, AZ	L 14–26		
October 19	at New Mexico A&M	Quesenberry Field; Las Cruces, NM	T 6–6		
October 27	Arizona State	Skidmore Field; Flagstaff, AZ	L 0–21		
November 3	at Western State (CO)*	Gunnison, CO	W 12–0		
November 24	at Arizona State	Irish Field; Tempe, AZ	L 0–6		
*Non-conference game
