= 1935 Texas Mines Miners football team =

American college football season

1935 Texas Mines Miners football
- Conference: Border Conference
- Record: 1–8 (0–3 Border)
- Head coach: Mack Saxon (7th season)

1935 Border Conference football standings
	Conf.					Overall
Team	W		L		T	W		L		T
Arizona $	4	–	0	–	0	7	–	2	–	0
New Mexico A&M	4	–	1	–	0	7	–	1	–	2
New Mexico	3	–	2	–	0	6	–	4	–	0
Arizona State	2	–	3	–	1	2	–	5	–	1
Arizona State–Flagstaff	0	–	3	–	1	3	–	3	–	3
Texas Tech	0	–	1	–	0	5	–	3	–	2
Texas Mines	0	–	3	–	0	1	–	8	–	0
$ – Conference champion

The 1935 Texas Mines Miners football team was an American football team that represented Texas School of Mines (now known as the University of Texas at El Paso) as a member of the Border Conference during the 1935 college football season. In its seventh season under head coach Mack Saxon, the team compiled a 1–8 record (0–3 against Border Conference opponents), finished last in the conference, and was outscored by a total of 178 to 23.

== Schedule ==
Date	Opponent	Site	Result	Source
September 28	at New Mexico	University Stadium; Albuquerque, NM	L 0–20	
October 5	St. Mary's (TX)*	Kidd Field; El Paso, TX	L 0–38	
October 12	at New Mexico Military*	Roswell, NM	L 6–13	
October 19	vs. Sul Ross*	Highland Fairgrounds; Marfa, TX	L 7–19	
October 25	West Texas State*	Kidd Field; El Paso, TX	L 0–14	
November 11	at Arizona State	Irish Field; Tempe, AZ	L 0–14	
November 15	Silver City Teachers*^{†}	Kidd Field; El Paso, TX	W 9–7	
November 23	Hardin–Simmons*	Kidd Field; El Paso, TX	L 0–46	
November 28	at New Mexico A&M	Quesenberry Field; Las Cruces, NM (rivalry)	L 0–7	
*Non-conference game; ^{†}Homecoming
