= Ernest Wills =

Ernest Wills may refer to:

- Ernest C. Wills, American football, basketball and baseball coach
- Sir Ernest Wills, 3rd Baronet (1869–1958), Lord Lieutenant of Wiltshire
