= 1935 Arizona State–Flagstaff Lumberjacks football team =

American college football season

1935 Arizona State–Flagstaff Lumberjacks football
- Conference: Border Conference
- Record: 3–3–3 (0–3–1 Border)
- Head coach: Ira MacIntosh (3rd season)
- Home stadium: Skidmore Field

1935 Border Conference football standings
	Conf.					Overall
Team	W		L		T	W		L		T
Arizona $	4	–	0	–	0	7	–	2	–	0
New Mexico A&M	4	–	1	–	0	7	–	1	–	2
New Mexico	3	–	2	–	0	6	–	4	–	0
Arizona State	2	–	3	–	1	2	–	5	–	1
Arizona State–Flagstaff	0	–	3	–	1	3	–	3	–	3
Texas Tech	0	–	1	–	0	5	–	3	–	2
Texas Mines	0	–	3	–	0	1	–	8	–	0
$ – Conference champion

The 1935 Arizona State–Flagstaff Lumberjacks football team represented the Arizona State Teachers College at Flagstaff (now known as Northern Arizona University) as a member of the Border Conference during the 1935 college football season. Led by third-year head coach Ira MacIntosh, the Lumberjacks compiled an overall record of 3–3–3, with a mark of 0–3–1 in conference play, and finished sixth in the Border.

== Schedule ==
Date	Opponent	Site	Result	Attendance	Source
September 21	Adams State*	Skidmore Field; Flagstaff, AZ	W 61–0		
September 28	Occidental*	Skidmore Field; Flagstaff, AZ	T 0–0	700	
October 5	New Mexico A&M	Skidmore Field; Flagstaff, AZ	L 0–7		
October 12	Western State (CO)*^{†}	Skidmore Field; Flagstaff, AZ	W 23–12		
October 19	at New Mexico	University Field; Albuquerque, NM	L 0–20		
October 26	Arizona State	Skidmore Field; Flagstaff, AZ	L 0–6		
November 2	Pomona*	Skidmore Field; Flagstaff, AZ	T 0–0		
November 16	at Arizona State	Irish Field; Tempe, AZ	T 0–0	3,000	
November 28	at Cal Poly*	Mustang Stadium; San Luis Obispo, CA	W 15–12		
*Non-conference game; ^{†}Homecoming
