= 1933 New Mexico Lobos football team =

1993 football season

1933 New Mexico Lobos football
- Conference: Border Conference
- Record: 3–4–1 (2–2 Border)
- Head coach: Chuck Riley (3rd season)
- Captain: Jack Walton
- Home stadium: University Field

1933 Border Conference football standings
| | Conf. | | | | | Overall |
| Team | W | | L | | T | W | | L | | T |
|---|---|---|---|---|---|---|---|---|---|---|
| Texas Tech | 1 | – | 0 | – | 0 | 8 | – | 1 | – | 0 |
| Arizona State–Flagstaff | 3 | – | 1 | – | 0 | 5 | – | 1 | – | 0 |
| Arizona | 3 | – | 2 | – | 0 | 5 | – | 3 | – | 0 |
| New Mexico | 2 | – | 2 | – | 0 | 3 | – | 4 | – | 1 |
| Arizona State | 2 | – | 2 | – | 0 | 3 | – | 5 | – | 0 |
| New Mexico A&M | 0 | – | 4 | – | 0 | 2 | – | 6 | – | 0 |
Arizona State and Arizona State–Flagstaff played twice, but only the first meeting counted in the conference standings.

The 1933 New Mexico Lobos football team represented the University of New Mexico as a member of the Border Conference during the 1933 college football season. In their third and final season under head coach Chuck Riley, the Lobos compiled an overall record of 3–4–1 record with a mark of 2–2 against conference opponents, tying for fourth place in the Border Conference, and were outscored 108 to 92. Jack Walton was the team captain.

In January 1934, the university's board of regents announced that Riley's contract as head football coach would not be renewed.

== Schedule ==
| Date | Opponent | Site | Result | Attendance | Source |
|---|---|---|---|---|---|
| September 30 | Arizona State–Flagstaff | University Field; Albuquerque, NM | L 0–14 | 2,500 | |
| October 14 | at New Mexico Military* | Roswell, NM | T 6–6 | 3,000 | |
| October 21 | Arizona State | University Field; Albuquerque, NM | L 13–26 | | |
| October 28 | Loyola (CA)* | University Field; Albuquerque, NM | L 7–43 | 2,000 | |
| November 4 | New Mexico Normal* | University Field; Albuquerque, NM | W 45–6 | 3,000 | |
| November 11 | Arizona^{†} | University Field; Albuquerque, NM (rivalry) | W 7–0 | | |
| November 24 | at New Mexico A&M | Quesenberry Field; Las Cruces, NM (rivalry) | W 14–7 | | |
| November 30 | Colorado Teachers* | University Field; Albuquerque, NM | L 0–6 | | |
*Non-conference game; ^{†}Homecoming
