= 1934 Arizona Wildcats football team =

American college football season

1934 Arizona Wildcats football
- Conference: Border Conference
- Record: 7–2–1 (2–1–1 Border)
- Head coach: Tex Oliver (2nd season)
- Captain: Bud Robinson
- Home stadium: Arizona Stadium

1934 Border Conference football standings
	Conf.					Overall
Team	W		L		T	W		L		T
Texas Tech	1	–	0	–	0	7	–	2	–	1
New Mexico	3	–	1	–	0	8	–	1	–	0
Arizona	2	–	1	–	1	7	–	2	–	1
Arizona State	2	–	2	–	1	4	–	3	–	1
New Mexico A&M	0	–	1	–	3	4	–	1	–	3
Arizona State–Flagstaff	0	–	3	–	1	1	–	5	–	1

The 1934 Arizona Wildcats football team represented the University of Arizona in the Border Conference during the 1934 college football season. In their second season under head coach Tex Oliver, the Wildcats compiled a 7–2–1 record (2–1–1 against Border opponents), finished in third place in the conference, and outscored their opponents, 138 to 54. The team captain was Bud Robinson. The team played its home games at Arizona Stadium in Tucson, Arizona.

== Schedule ==
Date	Time	Opponent	Site	Result	Attendance	Source
September 29		San Diego State*	Arizona Stadium; Tucson, AZ	W 7–0	6,000	
October 5		at Colorado Agricultural*	Colorado Field; Fort Collins, CO	W 7–3		
October 12		at Whittier*	Hadley Field; Whittier, CA	W 14–7		
October 20		Loyola (CA)*	Arizona Stadium; Tucson, AZ	L 0–6	9,000	
October 26		New Mexico A&M	Arizona Stadium; Tucson, AZ	T 0–0		
November 3		New Mexico	Arizona Stadium; Tucson, AZ (rivalry)	W 14–6		
November 9	7:00 p.m.	at Oklahoma City*	Goldbug Field; Oklahoma City, OK	W 26–6		
November 17		Arizona State	Arizona Stadium; Tucson, AZ (rivalry)	W 32–6		
November 29		Texas Tech	Arizona Stadium; Tucson, AZ	L 7–13	5,000–7,000	
December 7		vs. Pacific (CA)*	Phoenix Stadium; Phoenix, AZ	W 31–7	7,000	
*Non-conference game; All times are in Mountain time
