= 1933 Arizona Wildcats football team =

American college football season

1933 Arizona Wildcats football
- Conference: Border Conference
- Record: 5–3 (3–2 Border)
- Head coach: Tex Oliver (1st season)
- Captain: Clarence Sample
- Home stadium: Arizona Stadium

1933 Border Conference football standings
	Conf.					Overall
Team	W		L		T	W		L		T
Texas Tech	1	–	0	–	0	8	–	1	–	0
Arizona State–Flagstaff	3	–	1	–	0	5	–	1	–	0
Arizona	3	–	2	–	0	5	–	3	–	0
New Mexico	2	–	2	–	0	3	–	4	–	1
Arizona State	2	–	2	–	0	3	–	5	–	0
New Mexico A&M	0	–	4	–	0	2	–	6	–	0
Arizona State and Arizona State–Flagstaff played twice, but only the first meeting counted in the conference standings.

The 1933 Arizona Wildcats football team represented the University of Arizona in the Border Conference during the 1933 college football season. In their first season under head coach Tex Oliver, the Wildcats compiled a 5–3 record (3–2 against Border opponents), finished in third place in the conference, and outscored their opponents, 113 to 35. The team captain was Clarence Sample. The team played its home games at Arizona Stadium in Tucson, Arizona.

== Schedule ==
Date	Opponent	Site	Result	Attendance	Source
September 29	Occidental*	Arizona Stadium; Tucson, AZ	W 18–0		
October 6	at Loyola (CA)*	Wrigley Field; Los Angeles, CA	L 13–14	5,000	
October 14	Texas Tech	Arizona Stadium; Tucson, AZ	L 0–7	5,000	
October 27	at New Mexico A&M	Quesenberry Field; Las Cruces, NM	W 6–0		
November 4	Arizona State–Flagstaff	Arizona Stadium; Tucson, AZ	W 24–0	5,000	
November 11	at New Mexico	University Field; Albuquerque, NM (rivalry)	L 0–7		
November 18	at Arizona State	Phoenix Stadium; Phoenix, AZ (rivalry)	W 26–7	6,000	
November 30	Whittier*	Arizona Stadium; Tucson, AZ	W 26–0	4,000	
*Non-conference game
