= 1933 Arizona State–Flagstaff Lumberjacks football team =

American college football season

1933 Arizona State–Flagstaff Lumberjacks football
- Conference: Border Conference
- Record: 5–1 (3–1 Border)
- Head coach: Ira MacIntosh (1st season)
- Home stadium: Skidmore Field

1933 Border Conference football standings
	Conf.					Overall
Team	W		L		T	W		L		T
Texas Tech	1	–	0	–	0	8	–	1	–	0
Arizona State–Flagstaff	3	–	1	–	0	5	–	1	–	0
Arizona	3	–	2	–	0	5	–	3	–	0
New Mexico	2	–	2	–	0	3	–	4	–	1
Arizona State	2	–	2	–	0	3	–	5	–	0
New Mexico A&M	0	–	4	–	0	2	–	6	–	0
Arizona State and Arizona State–Flagstaff played twice, but only the first meeting counted in the conference standings.

The 1933 Arizona State–Flagstaff Lumberjacks football team was an American football team that represented Arizona State Teachers College at Flagstaff (now known as Northern Arizona University) in the Border Conference during the 1933 college football season. In their first year under head coach Ira MacIntosh, the Lumberjacks compiled an overall record of 5–1 with a mark of 3–1 in conference play, placing second in the Border Conference, and outscored opponents 59 to 38.

On October 14, 1933, the school dedicated Skidmore Field, its new turf-covered gridiron.

== Schedule ==
Date	Opponent	Site	Result	Attendance	Source
September 30	Redlands*	Skidmore Field; Flagstaff, AZ	W 13–6		
October 7	at New Mexico	University Stadium; Albuquerque, NM	W 14–0	2,500	
October 14	New Mexico A&M^{†}	Skidmore Field; Flagstaff, AZ	W 13–7		
October 28	Arizona State	Skidmore Field; Flagstaff, AZ	W 13–0		
November 4	at Arizona	Arizona Stadium; Tucson, AZ	L 0–24	5,000	
November 30	at Arizona State* (Note: The second game between Arizona State–Flagstaff and Arizona State did not count in the Border Conference standings.)	Irish Field; Tempe, AZ	W 6–0		
*Non-conference game; ^{†}Homecoming
