= 1935 Arizona State Bulldogs football team =

American college football season

1935 Arizona State Bulldogs football
- Conference: Border Conference
- Record: 2–5–1 (2–2–1 Border)
- Head coach: Rudy Lavik (3rd season)
- Captain: Dan Pace
- Home stadium: Irish Field

1935 Border Conference football standings
	Conf.					Overall
Team	W		L		T	W		L		T
Arizona $	4	–	0	–	0	7	–	2	–	0
New Mexico A&M	4	–	1	–	0	7	–	1	–	2
New Mexico	3	–	2	–	0	6	–	4	–	0
Arizona State	2	–	3	–	1	2	–	5	–	1
Arizona State–Flagstaff	0	–	3	–	1	3	–	3	–	3
Texas Tech	0	–	1	–	0	5	–	3	–	2
Texas Mines	0	–	3	–	0	1	–	8	–	0
$ – Conference champion

The 1935 Arizona State Bulldogs football team was an American football team that represented Arizona State Teachers College (later renamed Arizona State University) in the Border Conference during the 1935 college football season. In their third season under head coach Rudy Lavik, the Bulldogs compiled a 2–5–1 record (2–2–1 against Border opponents) and were outscored by their opponents by a combined total of 66 to 29. The team captain was left tackle Dan Pace. The Bulldogs finished 1-2-1 at home and 1-3 on the road. All home games were played at Irish Field in Tempe, Arizona.

== Schedule ==
Date	Opponent	Site	Result	Attendance	Source
September 28	at Arizona	Arizona Stadium; Tucson, AZ (rivalry)	L 0–26		
October 5	Loyola (CA)*	Phoenix High School Stadium; Phoenix, AZ	L 3–7	5,000	
October 19	at New Mexico A&M	Quesenberry Field; Las Cruces, NM	L 6–7		
October 26	at Arizona State–Flagstaff	Skidmore Field; Flagstaff, AZ	W 6–0		
November 2	at New Mexico	University Field; Albuquerque, NM	L 0–13		
November 11	Texas Mines	Irish Field; Tempe, AZ	W 14–0		
November 16	Arizona State–Flagstaff^{†}	Irish Field; Tempe, AZ	T 0–0	3,000	
November 23	BYU*	Montgomery Stadium; Phoenix, AZ	L 0–13	9,000	
*Non-conference game; ^{†}Homecoming

== Game summaries ==
In the rivalry matchup, Arizona State Teacher's College suffered a 26-0 road shutout against Arizona. During their home opener in Tempe, the Bulldogs dropped a 7-3 contest to Loyola. ASTC fell 7-6 in a road matchup against New Mexico State. The Bulldogs bounced back with a 6-0 shutout road victory at Arizona State Teachers College at Flagstaff (ASTCF, later renamed Northern Arizona University). Arizona State was shutout, 13-0, against New Mexico on the road. The Bulldogs rebounded with a 14-0 home shutout win over Texas-El Paso at Irish Field. In the rematch at Tempe, ASTC ended in a 0-0 tie with ASTCF. The Bulldogs closed the season with a 13-0 home shutout loss to BYU. It marked the first ever meeting between the teams in school history.

== Roster ==
The usual Arizona State lineup included left end Clare Van Hoorebeke, left tackle Don Pace, left guard Al Dalmolin, center Bob Buntz, right guard Howard Wynn, right tackle Al Northern, right end John Rouse, quarterback Ted Miller, halfbacks Bill Parry and Bill Kajikawa, and fullback Everett Jenkens.

William Ball, Francis Clevenger, & Bennet Davis were also on the roster.

== Awards and honors ==
Left guard Al Dalmolin earned All-Border Conference honors for the 1935 football season.
