= 1933 Arizona State Bulldogs football team =

American college football season

1933 Arizona State Bulldogs football
- Conference: Border Conference
- Record: 3–5 (2–2 Border)
- Head coach: Rudy Lavik (1st season)
- Captain: Paul Griffin
- Home stadium: Irish Field

1933 Border Conference football standings
	Conf.					Overall
Team	W		L		T	W		L		T
Texas Tech	1	–	0	–	0	8	–	1	–	0
Arizona State–Flagstaff	3	–	1	–	0	5	–	1	–	0
Arizona	3	–	2	–	0	5	–	3	–	0
New Mexico	2	–	2	–	0	3	–	4	–	1
Arizona State	2	–	2	–	0	3	–	5	–	0
New Mexico A&M	0	–	4	–	0	2	–	6	–	0
Arizona State and Arizona State–Flagstaff played twice, but only the first meeting counted in the conference standings.

The 1933 Arizona State Bulldogs football team was an American football team that represented Arizona State Teachers College (later renamed Arizona State University) in the Border Conference during the 1933 college football season. Led by first-year head coach Rudy Lavik, the Bulldogs compiled an overall record of 3–5 record with a mark of 2–2 in conference play, tying for fourth place in the Border Conference, and were outscored by opponents 125 to 73.

Lavik was hired as the team's head coach in July 1933, replacing Ted Shipkey. He had previously served for six years as the football coach at Arizona State Teachers College at Flagstaff—now known as Northern Arizona University. Prior to that, Lavik coached at Colorado State Agricultural College—now known as Colorado State University. The team captain was Paul Griffin. Earl Pomeroy was an assistant coach. The Bulldogs finished 2–2 at home and 1–3 on the road.

== Schedule ==
Date	Opponent	Site	Result	Attendance
September 29	at Whittier*	Whittier, CA	L 0–27	
October 7	at San Diego Marines*	San Diego, CA	L 0–26	
October 21	at New Mexico	University Field; Albuquerque, NM	W 26–13	
October 28	at Arizona State–Flagstaff	Skidmore Field; Flagstaff, AZ	L 0–13	
November 4	Fresno State*	High school stadium; Phoenix, AZ	W 21–7	
November 11	New Mexico A&M^{†}	Irish Field; Tempe, AZ	W 19–7	3,000
November 18	Arizona	Phoenix Stadium; Phoenix, AZ (rivalry)	L 7–26	6,000
November 30	Arizona State–Flagstaff (Note: The second game between Arizona State–Flagstaff and Arizona State did not count in the Border Conference standings.)*	Irish Field; Tempe, AZ	L 0–6	
*Non-conference game; ^{†}Homecoming

== Game summaries ==
On September 29, Arizona State lost its season opener on the road against the Whittier College Poets by a 27–0 score.

On October 7, the Bulldogs lost to the San Diego Marines, 26–0, at Sports Field in San Diego. It was the first meeting between the two football programs.

On October 21, Arizona State delivered a 26–13 road win at New Mexico.

On October 28, the Bulldogs fell 13–0 on the road against Arizona State-Flagstaff (later renamed Northern Arizona University).

On November 4, in their home opener, Arizona State defeated Fresno State, 21–7, at the high school stadium in Phoenix.

On November 11, the Bulldogs earned their second consecutive win with a 19–7 victory over New Mexico A&M (later renamed New Mexico State University) before a crowd of 3,000 persons in Tempe.

On November 18, in the Arizona–Arizona State football rivalry game in Tempe, Arizona State lost to Arizona, 26–7, in front of 6,000 spectators at Phoenix.

On November 30 (Thanksgiving Day), the Bulldogs were shut out, 6–0, by Arizona State-Flagstaff at Irish Field.

== Roster ==
The usual Arizona State lineup included left end Landon Hardesty, left tackle Anson Cooper, left guard Clarence Sexton, center Bill Boyle, right guard Claude Duval, right tackle Elton Harper, right end Tom Lillico, quarterback John McTeeley, halfbacks Wendell Pickens and Cyrus Lusher, and fullback Bill Baxter.

Sidney Anderson, William Ball, Johnny Burke, Lowell Callahan, George Ellingson, Bert Fireman, Vomen Fry, Meryl Furrey, Maurice Graham, London Hardesty, Leon Jones, and Heber Kleinman were also on the roster.

== Awards and honors ==
Fullback Bill Baxter earned first-team All-Border Conference honors for the 1933 football season.
