= 1935 Arizona Wildcats football team =

American college football season

1935 Arizona Wildcats football

Border champion
- Conference: Border Conference
- Record: 7–2 (4–0 Border)
- Head coach: Tex Oliver (3rd season)
- Captain: Bud Robinson
- Home stadium: Arizona Stadium

1935 Border Conference football standings
	Conf.					Overall
Team	W		L		T	W		L		T
Arizona $	4	–	0	–	0	7	–	2	–	0
New Mexico A&M	4	–	1	–	0	7	–	1	–	2
New Mexico	3	–	2	–	0	6	–	4	–	0
Arizona State	2	–	3	–	1	2	–	5	–	1
Arizona State–Flagstaff	0	–	3	–	1	3	–	3	–	3
Texas Tech	0	–	1	–	0	5	–	3	–	2
Texas Mines	0	–	3	–	0	1	–	8	–	0
$ – Conference champion

The 1935 Arizona Wildcats football team represented the University of Arizona in the Border Conference during the 1935 college football season. In their third season under head coach Tex Oliver, the Wildcats compiled a 7–2 record (4–0 against Border opponents), won the conference championship, and outscored their opponents, 218 to 45. The team captain was Charles Cochran. The team played its home games at Arizona Stadium in Tucson, Arizona.

== Schedule ==
Date	Opponent	Site	Result	Attendance	Source
September 28	Arizona State	Arizona Stadium; Tucson, AZ (rivalry)	W 26–0		
October 5	at Centenary*	Centenary Field; Shreveport, LA	L 7–14	5,000	
October 12	Whittier*	Arizona Stadium; Tucson, AZ	W 45–0		
October 19	at Loyola (CA)*	Gilmore Stadium; Los Angeles, CA	L 6–13	17,000	
October 26	New Mexico A&M	Arizona Stadium; Tucson, AZ	W 9–6		
November 2	Oklahoma City*	Arizona Stadium; Tucson, AZ	W 27–0		
November 11	at Texas Tech	Tech Field; Lubbock, TX	W 7–6	5,500	
November 23	at New Mexico	University Field; Albuquerque, NM (rivalry)	W 38–6		
November 28	Drake*	Arizona Stadium; Tucson, AZ	W 53–0		
*Non-conference game
