= Tex Oliver =

American football coach

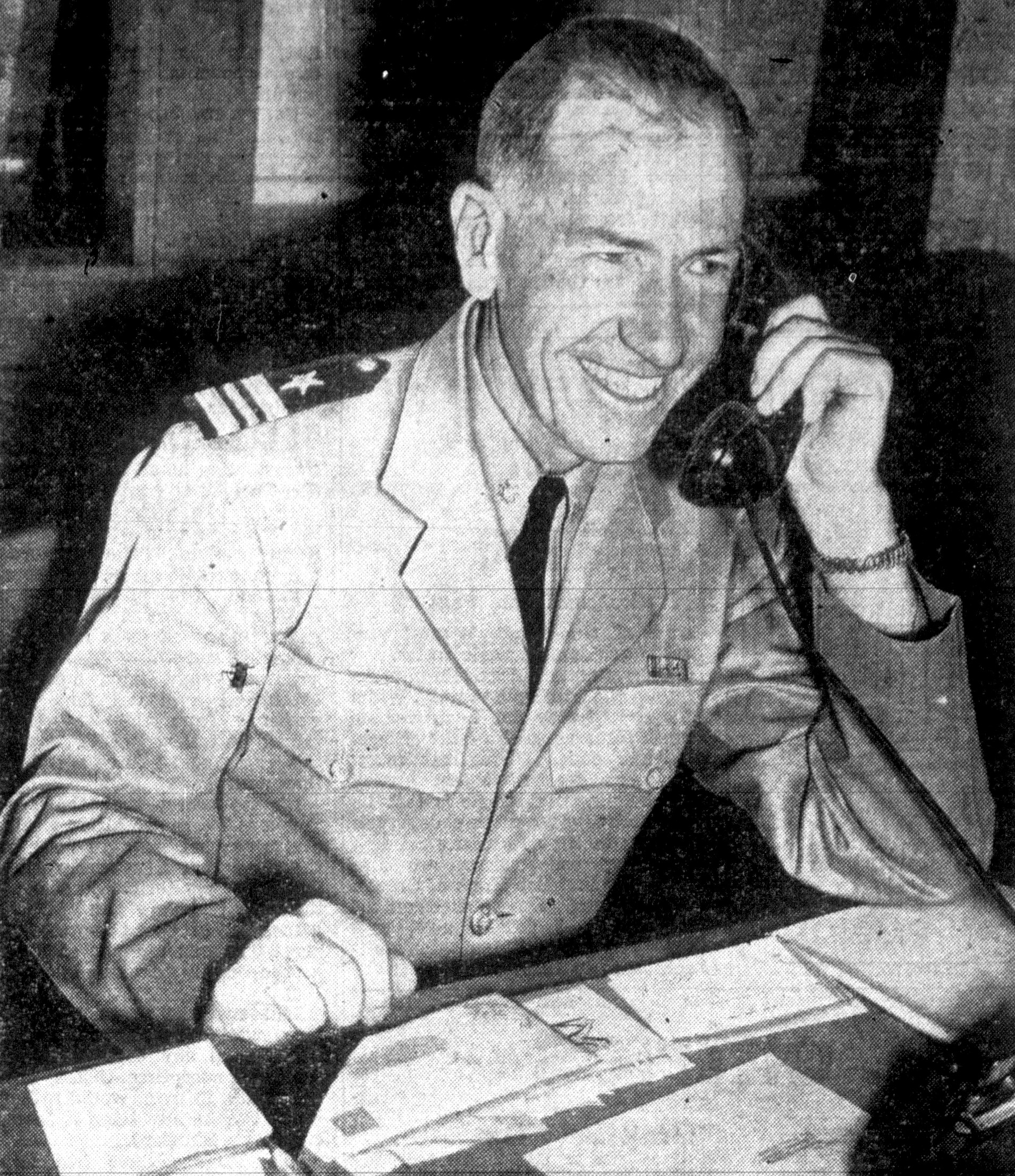
- Oliver, circa 1942

Biographical details
- Born: November 21, 1899
- Died: April 10, 1988 (aged 88); Costa Mesa, California, U.S.

Coaching career (HC unless noted)
- 1926–1932: Santa Ana HS (CA)
- 1933–1937: Arizona
- 1938–1941: Oregon
- 1942: Saint Mary's Pre-Flight
- 1945–1946: Oregon
- 1950–1951: Fullerton

Head coaching record
- Overall: 61–42–8 (college); 8–10–2 (junior college)

Accomplishments and honors

Championships
- 2 Border (1935–1936)

Gerald Allen "Tex" Oliver (November 21, 1899 – April 10, 1988) was an American football coach. He served as the head coach at the University of Arizona from 1933 to 1937 and at the University of Oregon from 1938 to 1941 and again from 1945 to 1946.

== Coaching career ==
From 1933 to 1937, Oliver coached the Arizona Wildcats to a 32–11–4 record. During that stretch, he never had a losing season. From 1938 to 1946, he coached the Oregon Webfoots to a 23–28–3 record.

== Later life and death ==
After retiring from coaching, Oliver worked as a school administrator in Compton and Lancaster, California. He retired as superintendent of schools in Lancaster in 1966. Oliver died of cancer on April 10, 1988, at his home in Costa Mesa, California.

== Head coaching record ==
=== College ===
Year	Team	Overall	Conference	Standing	Bowl/playoffs
Arizona Wildcats (Border Conference) (1933–1937)
1933	Arizona	5–3	3–2	T–3rd	
1934	Arizona	7–2–1	2–1–1	3rd	
1935	Arizona	7–2	4–0	1st	
1936	Arizona	5–2–3	3–0	1st	
1937	Arizona	8–2	3–1	3rd	
Arizona:		32–11–4	15–4–1		
Oregon Webfoots/Ducks (Pacific Coast Conference) (1938–1941)
1938	Oregon	4–5	4–4	5th	
1939	Oregon	3–4–1	3–3–1	5th	
1940	Oregon	4–4–1	3–4–1	5th	
1941	Oregon	5–5	4–4	5th	
Saint Mary's Pre-Flight Air Devils (Independent) (1942)
1942	Saint Mary's Pre-Flight	6–3–1			
Saint Mary's Pre-Flight:		6–3–1			
Oregon Ducks (Pacific Coast Conference) (1945–1946)
1945	Oregon	3–6	3–6	7th	
1946	Oregon	4–4–1	3–4–1	6th	
Oregon:		23–28–3	20–25–3		
Total:		61–42–8			
National championship Conference title Conference division title or championship game berth

=== Junior college ===
Year	Team	Overall	Conference	Standing	Bowl/playoffs
Fullerton Hornets (Eastern Conference) (1950–1951)
1950	Fullerton	4–4–2	1–3–2	5th	
1951	Fullerton	4–6	2–4	T–4th	
Fullerton:		8–10–2	3–7–2		
Total:		8–10–2			

== See also ==
- List of college football head coaches with non-consecutive tenure
