= 1935 New Mexico Lobos football team =

American college football season

1935 New Mexico Lobos football
- Conference: Border Conference
- Record: 6–4 (3–2 Border)
- Head coach: Gwinn Henry (2nd season)
- Home stadium: University Field

1935 Border Conference football standings
	Conf.					Overall
Team	W		L		T	W		L		T
Arizona $	4	–	0	–	0	7	–	2	–	0
New Mexico A&M	4	–	1	–	0	7	–	1	–	2
New Mexico	3	–	2	–	0	6	–	4	–	0
Arizona State	2	–	3	–	1	2	–	5	–	1
Arizona State–Flagstaff	0	–	3	–	1	3	–	3	–	3
Texas Tech	0	–	1	–	0	5	–	3	–	2
Texas Mines	0	–	3	–	0	1	–	8	–	0
$ – Conference champion

The 1935 New Mexico Lobos football team represented the University of New Mexico as a member of the Border Conference during the 1935 college football season. In their second season under head coach Gwinn Henry, the Lobos compiled a 6–4 record with a mark of 3–2 against conference opponents, finished third in the Border Conference, and outscored all opponents by a total of 145 to 102.

== Schedule ==
Date	Opponent	Site	Result	Attendance	Source
September 21	Silver City Teachers*	University Field; Albuquerque, NM	W 46–0		
September 28	Texas Mines	University Field; Albuquerque, NM	W 20–0		
October 5	at Oklahoma*	Memorial Stadium; Norman, OK	L 0–25	7,000	
October 12	at Colorado College*	Washburn Field; Colorado Springs, CO	W 13–0		
October 19	Arizona State–Flagstaff	University Field; Albuquerque, NM	W 20–0		
October 26	at New Mexico Military*	Roswell, NM	W 21–0		
November 2	Arizona State	University Field; Albuquerque, NM	W 13–0		
November 11	at New Mexico A&M	Quesenberry Field; Las Cruces, NM (rivalry)	L 0–32	4,000	
November 23	Arizona^{†}	University Field; Albuquerque, NM (rivalry)	L 6–38		
November 28	Colorado A&M*	University Field; Albuquerque, NM	L 6–7		
*Non-conference game; ^{†}Homecoming
