= 1933 New Mexico A&M Aggies football team =

American college football season

1933 New Mexico A&M Aggies football
- Conference: Border Conference
- Record: 2–6 (0–4 Border)
- Head coach: Jerry Hines (5th season)
- Home stadium: Quesenberry Field

1933 Border Conference football standings
	Conf.					Overall
Team	W		L		T	W		L		T
Texas Tech	1	–	0	–	0	8	–	1	–	0
Arizona State–Flagstaff	3	–	1	–	0	5	–	1	–	0
Arizona	3	–	2	–	0	5	–	3	–	0
New Mexico	2	–	2	–	0	3	–	4	–	1
Arizona State	2	–	2	–	0	3	–	5	–	0
New Mexico A&M	0	–	4	–	0	2	–	6	–	0
Arizona State and Arizona State–Flagstaff played twice, but only the first meeting counted in the conference standings.

The 1933 New Mexico A&M Aggies football team was an American football team that represented New Mexico College of Agriculture and Mechanical Arts (now known as New Mexico State University) as a member of the Border Conference during the 1933 college football season. In its fifth year under head coach Jerry Hines, the team compiled a 2–6 record (0–4 against conference opponents), finished last in the conference, and outscored opponents by a total of 100 to 72.

== Schedule ==
Date	Opponent	Site	Result	Attendance	Source
September 30	Wayland*	Quesenberry Field; Las Cruces, NM	W 63–0		
October 6	at New Mexico Normal*	Las Vegas, NM	W 14–4		
October 14	at Arizona State–Flagstaff	Skidmore Field; Flagstaff, AZ	L 7–13		
October 27	Arizona	Quesenberry Field; Las Cruces, NM	L 0–6		
November 4	at Texas Mines*	Mines Stadium; El Paso, TX (rivalry)	L 0–9		
November 11	at Arizona State	Irish Field; Tempe, AZ	L 7–19	3,000	
November 24	New Mexico^{†}	Quesenberry Field; Las Cruces, NM (rivalry)	L 7–14		
November 30	New Mexico Military*	Quesenberry Field; Las Cruces, NM	L 2–7		
*Non-conference game; ^{†}Homecoming
