= Ira MacIntosh =

American football player (1903–1973)

Biographical details
- Born: April 12, 1903; Providence, Rhode Island, U.S.
- Died: October 13, 1973; California, U.S.

Playing career

Football
- 1922–1923: Rhode Island State
- 1925–1926: Providence Steam Roller

Coaching career (HC unless noted)

Football
- 1927–1928: Lake Forest (assistant)
- 1929–1932: Lake Forest
- 1933–1935: Arizona State–Flagstaff
- 1936–1937: Swarthmore

Basketball
- 1929–1932: Lake Forest
- ?–1939: Swarthmore

Administrative career (AD unless noted)
- 1936–1939: Swarthmore

Head coaching record
- Overall: 24–29–11 (football); 16–30 (basketball, Lake Forest only)

Ira Daniel MacIntosh, also known as Mark MacIntosh, (April 12, 1903 – October 13, 1973) was an American football player and coach of football and basketball. He played college football at Rhode Island State College—now known as the University of Rhode Island—and professionally in the National Football League (NFL) with the Providence Steam Roller, in 1925 and 1926. McIntosh served as the head football coach at Lake Forest College from 1929 to 1932, Arizona State Teacher's College at Flagstaff—now known as Northern Arizona University—from 1933 to 1935, and Swarthmore College from 1936 to 1937, compiling a career college football coaching record of 24–29–11. He was also the head basketball coach at Lake Forest from 1929 to 1932, tallying a mark of 16–30.

== Head coaching record ==
=== College football ===
| Year | Team | Overall | Conference | Standing | Bowl/playoffs |
|---|---|---|---|---|---|
Lake Forest Foresters (Illinois Intercollegiate Athletic Conference) (1929–1932)
| 1929 | Lake Forest | 2–5 | 1–2 | 17th | |
| 1930 | Lake Forest | 5–1–1 | 2–1 | T–8th | |
| 1931 | Lake Forest | 0–2–4 | 0–2–2 | T–21st | |
| 1932 | Lake Forest | 4–3–1 | 2–2 | T–10th | |
| Lake Forest: | | 11–11–6 | 5–7–2 | | |
Arizona State Flagstaff–Lumberjacks (Border Conference) (1933–1935)
| 1933 | Arizona State–Flagstaff | 5–1 | 3–1 | 2nd | |
| 1934 | Arizona State–Flagstaff | 1–5–1 | 0–3–1 | 5th | |
| 1935 | Arizona State–Flagstaff | 3–3–3 | 0–3–1 | 5th | |
| Arizona State–Flagstaff: | | 9–9–4 | 3–7–2 | | |
Swarthmore Garnet Tide (Independent) (1936–1937)
| 1936 | Swarthmore | 2–5 | | | |
| 1937 | Swarthmore | 2–4–1 | | | |
| Swarthmore: | | 4–9–1 | | | |
| Total: | | 24–29–11 | | | |
