= 1934 Arizona State Bulldogs football team =

American college football season

1934 Arizona State Bulldogs football
- Conference: Border Conference
- Record: 4–3–1 (2–2 Border)
- Head coach: Rudy Lavik (2nd season)
- Captain: Clarence Sexton
- Home stadium: Irish Field

1934 Border Conference football standings
	Conf.					Overall
Team	W		L		T	W		L		T
Texas Tech	1	–	0	–	0	7	–	2	–	1
New Mexico	3	–	1	–	0	8	–	1	–	0
Arizona	2	–	1	–	1	7	–	2	–	1
Arizona State	2	–	2	–	1	4	–	3	–	1
New Mexico A&M	0	–	1	–	3	4	–	1	–	3
Arizona State–Flagstaff	0	–	3	–	1	1	–	5	–	1

The 1934 Arizona State Bulldogs football team was an American football team that represented Arizona State Teachers College (later renamed Arizona State University) in the Border Conference during the 1934 college football season. In their second season under head coach Rudy Lavik, the Bulldogs compiled a 4–3–1 record (2–2 against Border opponents) and were outscored by their opponents by a combined total of 113 to 91. The team captain was right end Clarence Sexton. The Bulldogs finished 2–1 at home and 2-2-1 on the road. All home games were played at Irish Field in Tempe, Arizona.

== Schedule ==
Date	Opponent	Site	Result	Attendance	Source
September 28	Caltech*	Irish Field; Tempe, AZ	W 25–7		
October 6	at Loyola (CA)*	Gilmore Stadium; Los Angeles, CA	L 0–43	10,000	
October 20	New Mexico	Irish Field; Tempe, AZ	L 12–18		
October 27	at Arizona State–Flagstaff	Skidmore Field; Flagstaff, AZ	W 21–0		
November 10	at New Mexico A&M	Quesenberry Field; Las Cruces, NM	T 7–7		
November 17	at Arizona	Arizona Stadium; Tucson, AZ (Territorial Cup)	L 6–32		
November 24	Arizona State–Flagstaff	Irish Field; Tempe, AZ	W 6–0		
November 29	at San Diego State*	Balboa Stadium; San Diego, CA	W 14–6	4,000	
*Non-conference game

== Game summaries ==
In the season opener, Arizona State defeated California Tech 25–7 at Irish Field. It marked the first ever meeting between the teams in school history. The Bulldogs suffered a 43–0 shutout loss against Loyola of Los Angeles on the road. Despite a 92-yard interception returned for a touchdown by William Baxter, Arizona State dropped an 18–12 home contest to New Mexico. The Bulldogs delivered a 21–0 shutout road victory at Arizona State Teachers College at Flagstaff (ASTCF, later renamed Northern Arizona University). Arizona State finished in a 7–7 tie during a road game against New Mexico State. During the rivalry matchup in Tucson, the Bulldogs dropped a 32-6 road game to Arizona. Arizona State produced a 6–0 shutout win over ASTCF in Tempe. The Bulldogs closed the season with a 14-6 road victory at San Diego State. It marked the first ever meeting between the teams in school history.

== Roster ==
The usual Arizona State lineup included left end John Rouse, left tackle Don Pace, left guard Bert Fireman, center Ron Hackleman, right guard Bill Boyle, right guard Al Dalmolin, right tackle Claude Duval, right end Clarence Sexton, quarterback Claude English, halfbacks Cyrus Lusher and Bill Parry, and fullback Bill Baxter.

William Ball, Stanford Brimhall, Bob Buntz, and Bennet Davis were also on roster.

== Awards and honors ==
Fullback William Baxter and right end Clarence Sexton earned All-Border Conference honors for the 1934 football season.
