= 1936 Sun Bowl =

American college football game

- 2nd Sun Bowl
New Mexico A&M Aggies	Hardin–Simmons Cowboys
(6–1–2)	(6–3)
Border Conference	Independent
14	14
Head coach: Jerry Hines	Head coach: Frank Kimbrough
	1	2	3	4	Total
New Mexico A&M	0	0	7	7	14
Hardin–Simmons	0	7	7	0	14
- Date: January 1, 1936
- Season: 1935
- Stadium: Jones Stadium
- Location: El Paso, Texas
- Referee: Harry Phillips
- Attendance: 11,000

The 1936 Sun Bowl was an American football postseason bowl game. The second edition of the game and the first Sun Bowl held between college teams, the idea was devised by Dr. Charles M. Hendricks. The festivities included a parade and a Sun Court.

== Background ==
The Cowboys finished second in the Border Conference to Arizona, who gave the Aggies (then known as New Mexico A&M) their only loss of the season.

== Game summary ==
- Hardin Simmons – Scroggins 15-yard touchdown pass from Tyler (Calloway kick)
- New Mexico State – Spanogle 1-yard touchdown run (A. Apodaca kick)
- Hardin-Simmons – Cherry 1-yard touchdown run (Green kick)
- New Mexico State – L. Apodaca 35-yard touchdown run, lateral from A. Apodaca on pass from Lem Pratt (A. Apodaca kick)

Despite four touchdowns combined in the game, play was marred by 15 turnovers that had 10 fumbles and five interceptions. An NCAA record was set for most punts combined, with 29. It was a physical game that was only 7–7 at halftime. After Ed Cherry gave the Cowboys the lead again on a touchdown run, the Aggies went to work again. Despite four interceptions on the day, Lem Pratt managed to throw a pass to Hooky Apodaca that he lateraled to Lauro Apodaca, who ran 35 yards to score the tying touchdown. The game had no more points from that point on despite desperate efforts on both sides, clinching the first tie game in Sun Bowl history.

== Aftermath ==
The Cowboys would make four more appearances, the last in 1958. The Aggies would make two more appearances, the last in 1960. There would not be a tie Sun Bowl game again until the 1940 Sun Bowl.

== Statistics ==
Statistics	New Mexico A&M	Hardin-Simmons
First downs	8	15
Yards rushing	83	210
Yards passing	121	92
Total yards	204	302
Fumbles-Lost	3-1	7–5
Interceptions	4	1
Penalties-Yards	8-75	10–86
