= 1935 New Mexico A&M Aggies football team =

American college football season

1935 New Mexico A&M Aggies football

Sun Bowl, T 14–14 vs. Hardin–Simmons
- Conference: Border Conference
- Record: 7–1–2 (4–1 Border)
- Head coach: Jerry Hines (7th season)
- Home stadium: Quesenberry Field

1935 Border Conference football standings
	Conf.					Overall
Team	W		L		T	W		L		T
Arizona $	4	–	0	–	0	7	–	2	–	0
New Mexico A&M	4	–	1	–	0	7	–	1	–	2
New Mexico	3	–	2	–	0	6	–	4	–	0
Arizona State	2	–	3	–	1	2	–	5	–	1
Arizona State–Flagstaff	0	–	3	–	1	3	–	3	–	3
Texas Tech	0	–	1	–	0	5	–	3	–	2
Texas Mines	0	–	3	–	0	1	–	8	–	0
$ – Conference champion

The 1935 New Mexico A&M Aggies football team was an American football team that represented New Mexico College of Agriculture and Mechanical Arts (now known as New Mexico State University) as a member of the Border Conference during the 1935 college football season. In their seventh year under head coach Jerry Hines, the team compiled a 7–1–2 record, finished second in the conference, played Hardin–Simmons to a tie in the 1936 Sun Bowl, and outscored all opponents by a total of 210 to 42. The team played its six home games at Quesenberry Field in Las Cruces, New Mexico.

Three of the Aggies' players were selected to the 1935 All-Border Conference football team: halfback Lauro Apodaca; guard Anthony George; and halfback Lem Pratt.

== Schedule ==
Date	Opponent	Site	Result	Attendance	Source
September 28	Eastern New Mexico*	Quesenberry Field; Las Cruces, NM	W 34–0		
October 5	at Arizona State–Flagstaff	Skidmore Field; Flagstaff, AZ	W 7–0		
October 12	at New Mexico Normal*	Las Vegas, NM	W 56–6		
October 19	Arizona State	Quesenberry Field; Las Cruces, NM	W 7–6		
October 26	at Arizona	Arizona Stadium; Tucson, AZ	L 6–9		
November 2	New Mexico Military*	Quesenberry Field; Las Cruces, NM	W 47–7		
November 11	New Mexico	Quesenberry Field; Las Cruces, NM (rivalry)	W 32–0	4,000	
November 22	Silver City Teachers*	Quesenberry Field; Las Cruces, NM	T 0–0		
November 28	Texas Mines	Quesenberry Field; Las Cruces, NM (rivalry)	W 7–0		
January 1, 1936	vs. Hardin–Simmons*	Jones Stadium; El Paso, TX (Sun Bowl)	T 14–14	11,000	
*Non-conference game
