= 1934 Texas Tech Matadors football team =

American college football season

1934 Texas Tech Matadors football
- Conference: Border Conference
- Record: 7–2–1 (1–0 Border)
- Head coach: Pete Cawthon (5th season)
- Offensive scheme: Single-wing
- Base defense: 6–2
- Captain: Malcolm Martin
- Home stadium: Tech Field

1934 Border Conference football standings
	Conf.					Overall
Team	W		L		T	W		L		T
Texas Tech	1	–	0	–	0	7	–	2	–	1
New Mexico	3	–	1	–	0	8	–	1	–	0
Arizona	2	–	1	–	1	7	–	2	–	1
Arizona State	2	–	2	–	1	4	–	3	–	1
New Mexico A&M	0	–	1	–	3	4	–	1	–	3
Arizona State–Flagstaff	0	–	3	–	1	1	–	5	–	1

The 1934 Texas Tech Matadors football team represented Texas Technological College—now known as Texas Tech University—as a member of the Border Conference during the 1934 college football season. In their fifth season under head coach Pete Cawthon, the Matadors compiled a 7–2–1 record (1–0 against conference opponents) and outscored opponents by a combined total of 192 to 84. The team played its home games at Tech Field.

== Schedule ==
Date	Opponent	Site	Result	Attendance	Source
September 22	Texas*	Tech Field; Lubbock, TX (rivalry)	L 6–12	9,000	
September 29	McMurry*	Tech Field; Lubbock, TX	W 24–7		
October 5	Baylor*	Tech Field; Lubbock, TX (rivalry)	W 14–7	5,000	
October 12	at Oklahoma City*	Goldbug Field; Oklahoma City, OK	W 20–0		
October 26	at Loyola (CA)*	Gilmore Stadium; Los Angeles, CA	L 7–12	19,000–20,000	
November 2	Texas Mines*	Tech Field; Lubbock, TX	W 27–0		
November 9	Hardin–Simmons*	Tech Field; Lubbock, TX	W 13–0	3,500	
November 16	DePaul*^{†}	Tech Field; Lubbock, TX	W 48–19	4,000	
November 23	North Dakota Agricultural*	Tech Field; Lubbock, TX	T 20–20	3,500	
November 29	at Arizona	Arizona Stadium; Tucson, AZ	W 13–7	5,000–7,000	
*Non-conference game; ^{†}Homecoming
