= Pete Cawthon =

American football player and coach (1898–1962)

- Cawthon, c. 1930s

Biographical details
- Born: March 24, 1898; Houston, Texas, U.S.
- Died: December 31, 1962 (aged 64); Sherman, Texas, U.S.

Playing career

Football
- 1917–1919: Southwestern (TX)
- Position: Halfback

Coaching career (HC unless noted)

Football
- 1919: Beaumont HS (TX)
- 1921–1922: Terrill Prep (TX)
- 1923–1927: Austin
- 1930–1940: Texas Tech
- 1942: Alabama (line)
- 1943–1944: Brooklyn Dodgers/Tigers
- 1945–1946: Detroit Lions (assistant)

Basketball
- 1920–1921: Rice
- 1923–1927: Austin

Baseball
- 1920–1921: Rice

Administrative career (AD unless noted)
- 1930–1940: Texas Tech
- 1952–1953: Alabama

Head coaching record
- Overall: 98–50–10 (college football); 2–18 (NFL)
- Bowls: 0–2

Accomplishments and honors

Championships
- 1 TIAA (1923); 1 Border (1937)

Peter Willis Cawthon (March 24, 1898 – December 31, 1962) was an American football player and coach. In addition to his football career, he also coached basketball and baseball. He served as the head football coach at Austin College from 1923 to 1927 and at Texas Technological College—now Texas Tech University—from 1930 to 1940, compiling a career college football coaching record of 99–52–10. Cawthon was the head coach for the Brooklyn Dodgers/Tigers of the National Football League (NFL) from 1942 to 1943. He served as the athletic director at Texas Tech from 1930 to 1941 and the University of Alabama from 1952 to 1953.

== Playing career ==
Cawthon graduated from Houston Central High School in 1917 and went on to attend Southwestern University in Georgetown, Texas. He lettered in baseball, football, and basketball during his freshman year. When the baseball coach left to fight in World War I, Cawthon took over the position. Cawthon earned four letters his sophomore year and was selected as an All-State halfback.

== Coaching career ==
In 1919, Cawthon took his first regular coaching job at Beaumont High School before becoming the baseball and basketball coach at Rice Institute—now Rice University—in 1920. In 1921, he moved to Dallas and was the head football coach at Terrill Prep for two years. In 1923, he moved on to coach at Austin College in Sherman, Texas, where he established the Cawthon Trophy, given annually to an outstanding individual at the school on the basis of athletic participation, leadership, and sportsmanship. His record at Austin College was 23–18–4 from 1923 to 1927. Austin won the Texas Intercollegiate Athletic Association title in 1923.

In 1930, Cawthon was hired by Texas Technological College—now Texas Tech University. By 1932, the Matadors—now the Red Raiders—became the highest-scoring team in the nation. He coached at the school through the 1940 season. During his tenure, he compiled a record of 76–32–6.

Cawthon served as line coach in football with the Alabama Crimson Tide during the 1942 season. From 1943 to 1944, Cawthon coached in the National Football League for the Brooklyn Dodgers/Tigers. He posted a 2–18 record during his time in the NFL. From 1952 to 1953, Cawthon served as athletic director at the University of Alabama.

== Death ==
Cawthon died after a heart attack on December 31, 1962, in Sherman, Texas.

== Head coaching record ==
=== Football ===
| Year | Team | Overall | Conference | Standing | Bowl/playoffs | AP^{#} |
|---|---|---|---|---|---|---|
Austin Kangaroos (Texas Intercollegiate Athletic Association) (1923–1925)
| 1923 | Austin | 7–2–1 | 4–0–1 | 1st | | |
| 1924 | Austin | 7–2–1 | 2–2–1 | T–6th | | |
| 1925 | Austin | 4–4–1 | 2–3 | 7th | | |
Austin Kangaroos (Texas Conference) (1926–1927)
| 1926 | Austin | 4–5 | 1–2 | 4th | | |
| 1927 | Austin | 1–5–1 | 0–2–1 | 6th | | |
| Austin: | | 23–18–4 | 9–9–3 | | | |
Texas Tech Matadors (Independent) (1930–1931)
| 1930 | Texas Tech | 3–6 | | | | |
| 1931 | Texas Tech | 6–3 | | | | |
Texas Tech Matadors / Red Raiders (Border Conference) (1932–1940)
| 1932 | Texas Tech | 10–2 | 2–0 | | | |
| 1933 | Texas Tech | 8–1 | 1–0 | | | |
| 1934 | Texas Tech | 7–2–1 | 1–0 | | | |
| 1935 | Texas Tech | 5–3–2 | 0–1 | 6th | | |
| 1936 | Texas Tech | 5–4–1 | 0–0 | 7th | | |
| 1937 | Texas Tech | 8–4 | 3–0 | 1st | L Sun | |
| 1938 | Texas Tech | 10–1 | 2–0 | | L Cotton | 11 |
| 1939 | Texas Tech | 5–5–1 | 2–1 | T–2nd | | |
| 1940 | Texas Tech | 9–1–1 | 0–1 | T–6th | | |
| Texas Tech: | | 76–32–6 | 11–3 | | | |
| Total: | | 99–50–10 | | | | |
National championship Conference title Conference division title or championship game berth
^{#}Rankings from final AP Poll.

=== Basketball ===
Record table
| Season | Team | Overall | Conference | Standing | Postseason |
|---|---|---|---|---|---|
Rice Owls (Southwest Conference) (1920–1921)
| 1920–21 | Rice | 5–10 | | | |
| Rice: | | 5–10 | | | |
| Total: | | | | | |
