= 1934 New Mexico A&M Aggies football team =

American college football season

1934 New Mexico A&M Aggies football
- Conference: Border Conference
- Record: 4–1–3 (0–1–3 Border)
- Head coach: Jerry Hines (6th season)
- Home stadium: Quesenberry Field

1934 Border Conference football standings
	Conf.					Overall
Team	W		L		T	W		L		T
Texas Tech	1	–	0	–	0	7	–	2	–	1
New Mexico	3	–	1	–	0	8	–	1	–	0
Arizona	2	–	1	–	1	7	–	2	–	1
Arizona State	2	–	2	–	1	4	–	3	–	1
New Mexico A&M	0	–	1	–	3	4	–	1	–	3
Arizona State–Flagstaff	0	–	3	–	1	1	–	5	–	1

The 1934 New Mexico A&M Aggies football team was an American football team that represented New Mexico College of Agriculture and Mechanical Arts (now known as New Mexico State University) as a member of the Border Conference during the 1934 college football season. In its fifth year under head coach Jerry Hines, the team compiled a 4–1–3 record (0–1–3 against conference opponents), finished fifth in the conference, and outscored opponents by a total of 169 to 25.

== Schedule ==
Date	Opponent	Site	Result	Attendance	Source
September 28	Wayland*	Quesenberry Field; Las Cruces, NM	W 52–0		
October 6	New Mexico Normal*	Quesenberry Field; Las Cruces, NM	W 59–0		
October 13	Sul Ross*	Quesenberry Field; Las Cruces, NM	W 13–0		
October 19	Arizona State–Flagstaff	Quesenberry Field; Las Cruces, NM	T 6–6		
October 26	at Arizona	Arizona Stadium; Tucson, AZ	T 0–0		
November 10	Arizona State^{†}	Quesenberry Field; Las Cruces, NM	T 7–7		
November 17	at New Mexico	University Field; Albuquerque, NM (rivalry)	L 6–12	4,500	
November 29	at New Mexico Military*	Roswell, NM	W 26–0		
*Non-conference game; ^{†}Homecoming
