= 1933 Texas Tech Matadors football team =

American college football season

1933 Texas Tech Matadors football
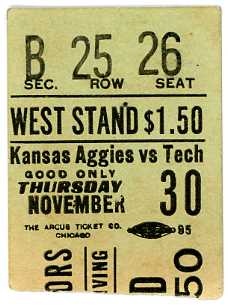
- Ticket stub from the November 30 game versus Kansas State
- Conference: Border Conference
- Record: 8–1 (1–0 Border)
- Head coach: Pete Cawthon (4th season)
- Offensive scheme: Single-wing
- Base defense: 6–2
- Captain: Ross Ayers
- Home stadium: Tech Field

1933 Border Conference football standings
	Conf.					Overall
Team	W		L		T	W		L		T
Texas Tech	1	–	0	–	0	8	–	1	–	0
Arizona State–Flagstaff	3	–	1	–	0	5	–	1	–	0
Arizona	3	–	2	–	0	5	–	3	–	0
New Mexico	2	–	2	–	0	3	–	4	–	1
Arizona State	2	–	2	–	0	3	–	5	–	0
New Mexico A&M	0	–	4	–	0	2	–	6	–	0
Arizona State and Arizona State–Flagstaff played twice, but only the first meeting counted in the conference standings.

The 1933 Texas Tech Matadors football team Texas Technological College—now known as Texas Tech University—as a member of the Border Conference during the 1933 college football season. In their fourth season under head coach Pete Cawthon, the Matadors compiled an 8–1 record (1–0 against conference opponents) and outscored opponents by a combined total of 144 to 30. The team played its home games at Tech Field.

== Schedule ==
Date	Time	Opponent	Site	Result	Attendance	Source
September 29		SMU*	Tech Field; Lubbock, TX	L 0–14	6,000	
October 6		Dixie (TX)*	Tech Field; Lubbock, TX	W 33–0		
October 14		at Arizona	Arizona Stadium; Tucson, AZ	W 7–0	5,000	
October 20		Louisiana Tech*	Tech Field; Lubbock, TX	W 40–10	4,178	
October 28		at Texas Mines*	Mines Stadium; El Paso, TX	W 12–0		
November 4	8:00 p.m.	Haskell*	Tech Field; Lubbock, TX	W 26–6		
November 11		Simmons (TX)*^{†}	Tech Field; Lubbock, TX	W 7–0	6,500	
November 17		Baylor*	Tech Field; Lubbock, TX (rivalry)	W 13–0	4,000	
November 30		Kansas State*	Tech Field; Lubbock, TX	W 6–0	7,500	
*Non-conference game; ^{†}Homecoming; All times are in Central time
