= 1935 Texas Tech Matadors football team =

American college football season

1935 Texas Tech Matadors football
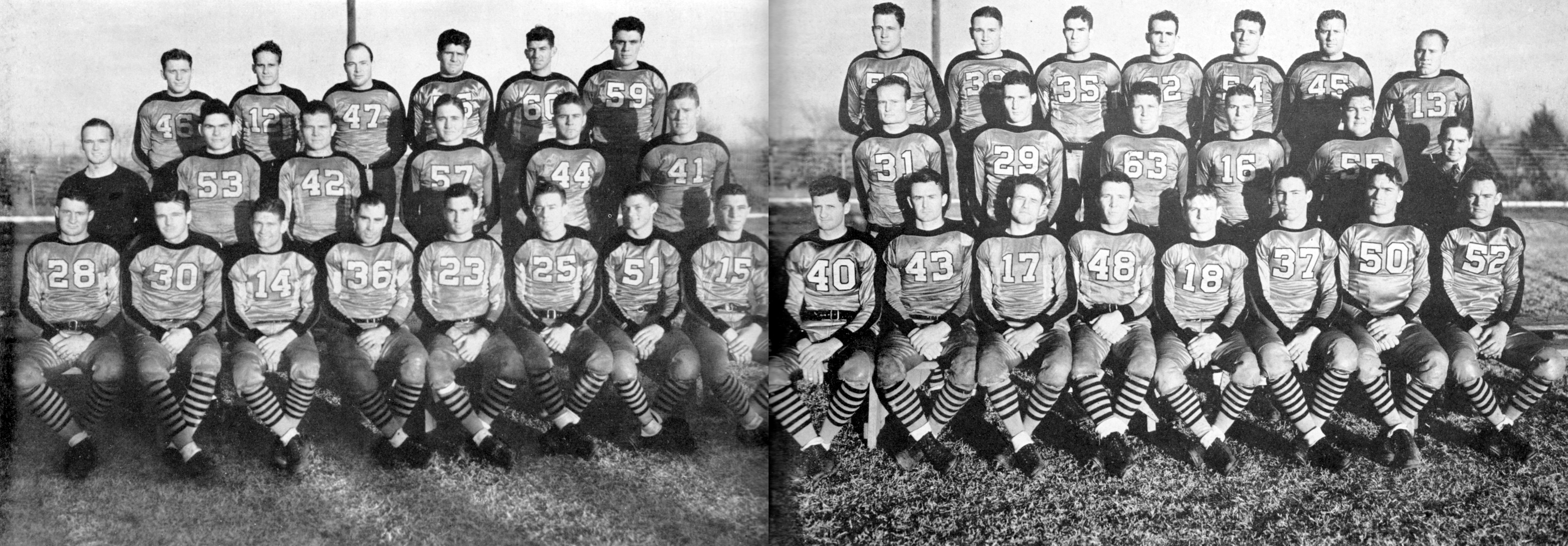
- Conference: Border Conference
- Record: 5–3–2 (0–1 Border)
- Head coach: Pete Cawthon (6th season)
- Offensive scheme: Single-wing
- Base defense: 6–2
- Captain: Walker Nichols
- Home stadium: Tech Field

1935 Border Conference football standings
	Conf.					Overall
Team	W		L		T	W		L		T
Arizona $	4	–	0	–	0	7	–	2	–	0
New Mexico A&M	4	–	1	–	0	7	–	1	–	2
New Mexico	3	–	2	–	0	6	–	4	–	0
Arizona State	2	–	3	–	1	2	–	5	–	1
Arizona State–Flagstaff	0	–	3	–	1	3	–	3	–	3
Texas Tech	0	–	1	–	0	5	–	3	–	2
Texas Mines	0	–	3	–	0	1	–	8	–	0
$ – Conference champion

The 1935 Texas Tech Matadors football team represented Texas Technological College—now known as Texas Tech University—as a member of the Border Conference during the 1935 college football season. In their sixth season under head coach Pete Cawthon, the Matadors compiled a 5–3–2 record (0–1 against conference opponents) and outscored opponents by a combined total of 110 to 55. The team played its home games at Tech Field.

== Schedule ==
Date	Opponent	Site	Result	Attendance	Source
September 20	at Hardin–Simmons*	Parramore Field; Abilene, TX	W 9–0	6,500	
September 27	Daniel Baker*	Tech Field; Lubbock, TX	W 27–6		
October 4	Wichita*	Tech Field; Lubbock, TX	W 13–7		
October 12	at DePaul*	Soldier Field; Chicago, IL	T 0–0	3,000	
October 25	at Loyola (CA)*	Gilmore Stadium; Los Angeles, CA	L 0–16	18,000	
November 2	Oklahoma A&M*	Tech Field; Lubbock, TX	W 14–0		
November 11	Arizona^{†}	Tech Field; Lubbock, TX	L 6–7	5,500	
November 23	at St. Mary's (TX)*	San Antonio, TX	W 27–0		
November 28	Detroit*	Tech Field; Lubbock, TX	T 7–12		
December 7	at Oklahoma City*	Goldbug Field; Oklahoma City, OK	T 7–7	2,000	
*Non-conference game; ^{†}Homecoming
