= Jerry Hines =

American football and basketball player and coach

Biographical details
- Born: 1903; Mesilla, New Mexico, U.S.
- Died: April 28, 1963 (aged 60); Albuquerque, New Mexico, U.S.

Playing career

Football
- 1922–1925: New Mexico A&M

Basketball
- 1923–1926: New Mexico A&M
- Positions: Quarterback (football); Guard (basketball)

Coaching career (HC unless noted)

Football
- c. 1927–1928: Las Cruces HS (NM)
- 1929–1939: New Mexico A&M

Basketball
- c. 1927–1929: Las Cruces HS (NM)
- 1929–1940: New Mexico A&M
- 1946–1947: New Mexico A&M

Administrative career (AD unless noted)
- 1929–1940: New Mexico A&M
- 1946–1947: New Mexico A&M

Head coaching record
- Overall: 54–36–10 (college football); 157–109 (college basketball)
- Bowls: 0–0–1
- Tournaments: Basketball; 2–1 (NAIA); 0–1 (NIT)

Accomplishments and honors

Championships
- Football; 1 Border (1938) Basketball; 4 Border (1937–1940)

Gerald H. Hines (1903 – April 28, 1963) was an American football and basketball player, coach and athletic director at New Mexico College of Agriculture and Mechanic Arts (New Mexico A&M), now known as New Mexico State University. Hines led the Aggies to multiple successful football and basketball seasons during the 1930s.

Hines was born in Mesilla, New Mexico in 1903 with twin brother, Harold, to Dr. Lemuel Hines and his wife, Minnie Hankins. Hines attended Las Cruces Union High School from 1918 to 1922 and New Mexico A&M from 1922 to 1926. Hines was a captain of the Aggie basketball team and a quarterback for the Aggie football team.

Hines became head basketball and football coach at New Mexico A&M in 1929, and athletics director in 1930. Both teams excelled under Hines. Between 1934 and 1938, football was 31–10–6, and from 1935 to 1940, the basketball team went 102–36. The football team was invited to the first Sun Bowl in 1936 where they tied the Hardin–Simmons Cowboys, 14–14.

World War II brought an early end to Hines’ coaching career. As a battery commander of the 120th Combat Engineers, a New Mexico National Guard unit assigned to the 45th Infantry Division, Hines was among the first called to military duty in September 1940. He served honorably in Africa, Sicily, and Italy.

Hines ended his coaching career at NMSU with records of 54–36–10 in football, and 157–109 in basketball. He died in Albuquerque, New Mexico in 1963 at age 59.

Hines entered the NMSU Athletics Hall of Fame in 1970 was inducted into the Aggie Basketball Ring of Honor in 2009.

== Head coaching record ==
=== Football ===
Year	Team	Overall	Conference	Standing	Bowl/playoffs
New Mexico A&M Aggies (Independent) (1929–1930)
1929	New Mexico A&M	3–2–3			
1930	New Mexico A&M	5–3			
New Mexico A&M Aggies (Border Conference) (1931–1939)
1931	New Mexico A&M	6–4	1–2	5th	
1932	New Mexico A&M	4–5–1	1–2–1	5th	
1933	New Mexico A&M	2–6	0–4	6th	
1934	New Mexico A&M	4–1–3	0–1–3	5th	
1935	New Mexico A&M	7–1–2	4–1	2nd	T Sun
1936	New Mexico A&M	6–4–1	3–2	3rd	
1937	New Mexico A&M	7–2	4–1	2nd	
1938	New Mexico A&M	7–2	4–1	T–1st	
1939	New Mexico A&M	3–6	1–4	6th	
New Mexico A&M:		54–36–10	18–18–4		
Total:		54–36–10			
National championship Conference title Conference division title or championship game berth

=== Basketball ===
Record table
Season	Team	Overall	Conference	Standing	Postseason
New Mexico A&M Aggies (Independent) (1929–1931)
1929–30	New Mexico A&M	12–14			
1930–31	New Mexico A&M	9–14			
New Mexico A&M Aggies (Border Conference) (1931–1940)
1931–32	New Mexico A&M	9–10	1–7	5th	
1932–33	New Mexico A&M	7–11	2–10	6th	
1933–34	New Mexico A&M	10–9	2–6	6th	
1934–35	New Mexico A&M	12–6	4–6	5th	
1935–36	New Mexico A&M	19–9	8–8	T–5th	
1936–37	New Mexico A&M	22–5	15–3	1st	
1937–38	New Mexico A&M	22–3	18–0	1st	NAIA Quarterfinal
1938–39	New Mexico A&M	20–4	14–2	1st	NIT Quarterfinal
1939–40	New Mexico A&M	16–7	12–4	T1st	
New Mexico A&M Aggies (Border Conference) (1946–1947)
1946–47	New Mexico A&M	8–17	2–14	9th	
Total:		157–109 (.590)			
National champion Postseason invitational champion Conference regular season champion Conference regular season and conference tournament champion Division regular season champion Division regular season and conference tournament champion Conference tournament champion
