= Hilman Walker =

American football player and coach (1912–1983)

Biographical details
- Born: October 10, 1912
- Died: June 12, 1983

Playing career

Football
- 1936: Alabama
- 1945: Saint Mary's Pre-Flight

Baseball
- 1934–1936: Alabama
- 1936: Macon Peaches
- 1937: Dayton Ducks
- 1937: Greensburg Green Sox
- 1938: Evansville Bees
- Positions: End (football); Outfielder (baseball)

Coaching career (HC unless noted)

Football
- 1937: Alabama (freshman)
- 1938–1941: Arizona State (line)
- 1942: Arizona State

Head coaching record
- Overall: 2–8

Hilman Bernard Walker (October 10, 1912 – May 12, 1983) was an American college football player and coach and college and Minor League Baseball player. Walker played football at the University of Alabama as an end. He served as the head football coach at Arizona State Teachers College at Tempe—now known as Arizona State University— for one season, in 1942, compiling a record of 2–8. Walker was the younger brother of Hub Walker and Gee Walker, who both played in Major League Baseball.

== Head coaching record ==
Year	Team	Overall	Conference	Standing	Bowl/playoffs
Arizona State Bulldogs (Border Conference) (1942)
1942	Arizona State	2–8	2–5	7th	
Arizona State:		2–8	2–5		
Total:		2–8			
