= Bill Kajikawa =

American sports player and coach (1912–2010)

Biographical details
- Born: September 6, 1912
- Died: February 12, 2010 (aged 97)

Playing career

Football
- 1934–1936: Arizona State

Coaching career (HC unless noted)

Football
- 1937–?: Arizona State (freshmen)
- ?–1978: Arizona State (freshmen)

Basketball
- 1948–1957: Arizona State

Baseball
- 1946–1952: Arizona State

Head coaching record
- Overall: 88–131 (basketball); 57–70 (baseball)

William Masao Kajikawa (September 6, 1912 – February 12, 2010) was an American football, basketball, and baseball coach. He served as the head basketball coach at Arizona State University from 1949 to 1957, compiling a record of 88–131, and the school's head baseball coach from 1946 to 1952, tallying a mark of 57–70. Kajikawa was also an assistant and freshmen football coach at Arizona State between 1937 and 1978.

Kajikawa attended Phoenix Union High School and played college football at Arizona State. During World War II Kajikawa was a member of the 442nd Regimental Combat Team. Kajikawa died on February 12, 2010. The football practice field on the Arizona State Tempe campus is named after him.
