= Bob Schermerhorn =

American basketball coach (1943–2018)

Biographical details
- Born: 1943
- Died: April 23, 2018 (aged 75)

Playing career
- 1968–1971: Orange Coast College

Coaching career (HC unless noted)
- 1974–1978: Canyon HS
- 1978–1980: Chaffey College
- 1980–1983: UC Irvine (assistant)
- 1983–1987: Southern Utah
- 1987–1989: Arizona State (assistant)
- 1989: Arizona State (interim)
- 1989–1998: Riverside City College
- 2005–2006: Fullerton College
- 2010–2013: Holy Cross College (Indiana)

Administrative career (AD unless noted)
- 1998–2005: Riverside City College
- 2006–2010: Santa Ana College

Robert Schermerhorn (1943 – April 23, 2018) was an American college basketball coach.

Schermerhorn came from South Bend, Indiana and played for church leagues but did not make varsity at South Bend Central High School. After high school, he joined the Marines and served in Vietnam, playing basketball in the jungle and improvising a court. He walked onto the basketball team at Orange Coast College in 1968 and seldom played, but impressed coach Herb Livesay with his knowledge of the game and Livesay set him up with basketball camps during the summer. Schermerhorn became head coach at Canyon High School in 1974 and coached for four seasons. He coached at Chaffey College until 1980, when it ceased its basketball program.

From 1980 to 1983, Schermerhorn served as assistant coach at UC Irvine under Bill Mulligan, where he helped develop the talents of Kevin Magee. In 1983, he became head coach at Southern Utah, serving until he accepted an assistant position at Arizona State in 1987. In 1989, he became the interim coach at Arizona State after Steve Patterson resigned under pressure. Schermerhorn guided the team to a 2–7 record but had an upset of UCLA. He was not retained when the administration wanted a big name coach.

Schermerhorn accepted the head coaching job at Riverside City College, where he went 17–16 his first season. By his fourth season, the team won 30 games. He was selected as the Orange Empire Conference (OEC) Coach of the Year in 1994 and 1996. By the end of his tenure in 1998, he had guided the team to a 225–98 record, becoming the second winningest coach in school history. He took over as the school's athletic director and was inducted into the California Community College Men's Basketball Hall of Fame in 2003. When Schermerhorn retired in 2005, he took over as the coach at Fullerton College for a season, then became the athletic director at Santa Ana College until 2010. He coached for three seasons at Holy Cross College (Indiana) and led the team to 32 wins and their first Chicagoland Collegiate Athletic Conference post-season tournament victory in 2012 before retiring the following year.

On April 23, 2018, Schermerhorn died of a heart attack after coming back from a doctor's appointment.
