= Steve Coutchie =

American football player and coach (1899–1983)

Biographical details
- Born: August 6, 1899; Budapest, Hungary
- Died: January 24, 1983 (aged 83); Bentonville, Arkansas, U.S.

Playing career
- 1922–1923: Illinois
- Position: Quarterback

Coaching career (HC unless noted)
- 1928–1945: Mesa HS (AZ)
- 1946: Arizona State

Head coaching record
- Overall: 2–7–2 (college football)

Stephen A. Coutchie (born Istvan Kuczaj; August 6, 1899 – January 24, 1983) was an American football player and coach. He served as the head football coach at Arizona State Teachers College at Tempe, now Arizona State University, in 1946, compiling a record of 2–7–2. Before coming to Arizona State, Coutchie coached both football and basketball at Mesa Union High School in Mesa, Arizona, winning a combined five state championships, two in football and three in basketball. He attended Thornton Township High School in Harvey, Illinois and played football as a quarterback at the University of Illinois at Urbana–Champaign from 1922 to 1923.

== Head coaching record ==
=== College football ===
Year	Team	Overall	Conference	Standing	Bowl/playoffs
Arizona State Sun Devils (Border Conference) (1946)
1946	Arizona State	2–7–2	1–4–1	8th	
Arizona State:		2–7–2	1–4–1		
Total:		2–7–2			
