= Frederick M. Irish =

American sports coach and athletics administrator, and science instructor (1870–1941)

Biographical details
- Born: May 16, 1870; Dubuque, Iowa, U.S.
- Died: April 12, 1941 (aged 70); Tempe, Arizona, U.S.

Coaching career (HC unless noted)
- 1897–1906: Arizona/Tempe Normal

Administrative career (AD unless noted)
- 1896–1913: Arizona/Tempe Normal

Head coaching record
- Overall: 12–8

Frederick Mortimer "Cap" Irish (May 16, 1870 – April 12, 1941) was an American football coach, college athletics administrator, and science instructor. He served as the first head football coach at the Territorial Normal School, renamed Tempe Normal School in 1903 and now known as Arizona State University, coaching from 1897 to 1906 and compiling a record of 12–8. Territorial Normal did not field a football team in 1898 or 1901. Irish was also the first athletic director at Territorial/Tempe Normal, serving from 1896 to 1913. In addition, he taught science at the school. Irish Field one of the original homes of Arizona State Football was also named after the coach and administrator.

Irish graduated from the University of Iowa in 1895 with a Bachelor of Science degree. He taught in his hometown of Dubuque, Iowa, before moving to Arizona.

Irish died at a hospital in Tempe, Arizona, on April 12, 1941. Irish Hall, a residence hall at Arizona State University, is named for him.

== Head coaching record ==
Year	Team	Overall	Conference	Standing	Bowl/playoffs
Arizona Normal Normals / Normal School Owls / Tempe Normal Owls (Independent) (1897–1906)
1897	Arizona Normal	0–1			
1898	No team				
1899	Normal School of Arizona	3–0			
1900	Normal School	1–1			
1901	No team				
1902	Tempe Normal	2–1			
1903	Tempe Normal	2–0			
1904	Tempe Normal	4–0			
1905	Tempe Normal	0–3			
1906	Tempe Normal	0–2			
Tempe Normal:		12–8			
Total:		12–8			
