= George E. Cooper =

American football player, sports coach, and college athletics administrator

Coaching career (HC unless noted)

Football
- 1919: Tempe Normal
- 1922–1927: Colorado State Teachers

Basketball
- 1917–1922: Tempe Normal
- 1922–1931: Colorado State Teachers

Baseball
- 1918–1922: Tempe Normal
- 1922–1926: Colorado State Teachers
- 1929: Colorado State Teachers

Administrative career (AD unless noted)
- 1917–1922: Tempe Normal

Head coaching record
- Overall: 15–13–1 (football); 130–62 (basketball); 60–28–1 (baseball)

George E. Cooper was an American football player, coach of football, basketball, and baseball, and college athletics administrator. He served as the head football coach at Tempe Normal School, now Arizona State University, in 1919 and at Colorado State Teachers College, now the University of Northern Colorado, from 1922 to 1927, compiling a career college football record of 15–13–1. Cooper was also the head basketball coach at Tempe Normal from 1917 to 1922 and at Colorado State Teachers from 1922 to 1931, tallying a career college basketball mark of 130–62. In addition, he coached baseball at the two schools, at Tempe Normal from 1918 to 1922, and at Colorado State Teachers from 1922 to 1926 and again in 1929, amassing a career college baseball record of 60–28–1. Cooper played football at Slippery Rock University of Pennsylvania.

== Head coaching record ==
=== Football ===
| Year | Team | Overall | Conference | Standing | Bowl/playoffs |
|---|---|---|---|---|---|
Tempe Normal Owls (Independent) (1919)
| 1919 | Tempe Normal | 0–2 | | | |
| Tempe Normal: | | 0–2 | | | |
Colorado State Teachers (Independent) (1922–1923)
| 1922 | Colorado State Teachers | 1–4–1 | | | |
| 1923 | Colorado State Teachers | 2–3–1 | | | |
| 1924 | Colorado State Teachers | 2–5 | | | |
Colorado State Teachers (Rocky Mountain Conference) (1925–1927)
| 1925 | Colorado State Teachers | 2–6–1 | 0–6 | 12th | |
| 1926 | Colorado State Teachers | 6–4 | 3–3 | T–6th | |
| 1927 | Colorado State Teachers | 2–7 | 1–6 | 12th | |
| Colorado State Teachers: | | 15–29–3 | 4–15 | | |
| Total: | | 15–31–3 | | | |
