= Ernest C. Wills =

American sports player and coach (1892–1976)

Biographical details
- Born: March 28, 1892; Clinton, Iowa, U.S.
- Died: December 24, 1976 (aged 84); Bryan, Texas, U.S.

Playing career
- 1913–1915: Iowa
- Position: Fullback

Coaching career (HC unless noted)

Football
- 1922: Tempe Normal
- 1923: Fremont HS (NE)
- 1924: Chadron Normal

Basketball
- 1922–1923: Tempe Normal
- 1924–1925: Chadron Normal

Baseball
- 1923: Tempe Normal

Administrative career (AD unless noted)
- 1922: Tempe Normal

Head coaching record
- Overall: 8–4–1 (college football); 12–14 (college basketball); 5–5 (college baseball)

Ernest Claude Wills (March 28, 1892 – December 24, 1976) was an American football, basketball, and baseball coach. He served as the head football coach at Tempe Normal School, now Arizona State University, in 1922 and at Chadron State College in 1924, compiling a career college football record of 8–4–1. Wills was also the head basketball coach at Tempe Normal in 1922–23, tallying a mark of 8–4, and the head baseball coach at the school in 1923, guiding his baseball squad to a 5–5 record. Wills graduated the University of Iowa in 1916 with a degree in engineering. He played on the Iowa Hawkeyes football team from 1913 through 1915.

Wills graduated from Clinton High School in Clinton, Iowa. In 1923, he was hired physical director and coach at Fremont High School in Fremont, Nebraska. Wills died on December 24, 1976, at St. Joseph Hospital in Bryan, Texas.

== Head coaching record ==
=== College football ===
Year	Team	Overall	Conference	Standing	Bowl/playoffs
Tempe Normal Bulldogs (Independent) (1919)
1922	Tempe Normal	0–3–1			
Tempe Normal:		0–3–1			
Chadron Normal Eagles (Nebraska College Athletic Conference) (1924)
1924	Chadron Normal	8–1	5–1	T–3rd	
Chadron Normal:		8–1	5–1		
Total:		8–4–1			
