= George Schaeffer =

American sports player, coach and athletics administrator

Coaching career (HC unless noted)

Football
- 1914–1916: Tempe Normal

Basketball
- 1914–1917: Tempe Normal

Baseball
- 1915–1917: Tempe Normal

Administrative career (AD unless noted)
- 1914–1917: Tempe Normal

Head coaching record
- Overall: 7–8 (football); 2–3 (basketball); 10–19 (baseball)

George Harrison Schaeffer was an American football player, coach of football, basketball, and baseball, and college athletics administrator. He served as the head football coach at Tempe Normal School, now Arizona State University, from 1914 to 1916, compiling a record of 7–8. Schaeffer was also the head basketball coach at Tempe Normal for the 1914–15 and 1916–17 seasons and the school's baseball coach from 1915 to 1917. He played football at Gettysburg College, graduating in 1914, and also attended Pennsylvania State College.

== Head coaching record ==
=== Football ===
Year	Team	Overall	Conference	Standing	Bowl/playoffs
Tempe Normal Owls (Independent) (1914–1916)
1914	Tempe Normal	4–3			
1915	Tempe Normal	3–2			
1916	Tempe Normal	0–3			
Tempe Normal:		7–8			
Total:		7–8			
