= Aaron McCreary =

American athlete and coach (1892–1984)

Biographical details
- Born: September 15, 1892; Winchester, California, U.S.
- Died: November 5, 1984 (aged 92); Festus, Missouri, U.S.

Playing career

Football
- 1914: Tempe Normal

Basketball
- 1913–1915: Tempe Normal

Baseball
- 1914–1915: Tempe Normal
- Position: Back (football)

Coaching career (HC unless noted)

Football
- 1923–1929: Tempe Normal / Tempe State / Arizona State

Basketball
- 1923–1930: Tempe Normal / Tempe State / Arizona State
- 1931–1940: Arizona State Flagstaff

Baseball
- 1924–1926: Tempe Normal / Tempe State
- 1928: Tempe State
- 1930–1931: Arizona State
- ?–1963: Arizona State Flagstaff

Administrative career (AD unless noted)
- 1923–1930: Tempe/Arizona State Teachers
- 1936–1949: Arizona State Flagstaff

Head coaching record
- Overall: 25–17–4 (football); 140–149 (basketball)

Aaron Monroe "Mac" McCreary (September 15, 1892 – November 5, 1984) was an American football, basketball, and baseball player, coach, and college athletics administrator. He served as the head football coach at Tempe State Teachers College—known at Arizona State Teachers College by 1929 and now called Arizona State University—compiling a career college football record of 25–17–4. McCreary was also the head basketball coach at Tempe/Arizona State Teachers from 1923 to 1930 and at Arizona State Teacher's College of Flagstaff—now known as Northern Arizona University—amassing a career college basketball record of 140–149. In addition, he coached baseball at Tempe/Arizona State Teachers (1924–1926, 1928, 1930–1931) and at Arizona State Teacher's Flagstaff. McCreary also coached track, skiing, and boxing, and assisted in football at Arizona State Teacher's Flagstaff before retiring in 1963. He is a member of the Northern Arizona University Athletics Hall of Fame.

McCreary letter in baseball, basketball, and track at Turlock High School in Turlock, California before graduating in 1913. He played football, basketball, and baseball at Arizona State, known as Tempe Normal College when he starred on the football team as a back in 1914. He earned a teaching diploma in 1915 from Tempe Normal and then enrolled at Pennsylvania College–now known as Gettysburg College—Gettysburg, Pennsylvania. McCreary joined the United States Army in 1917 and served overseas in World War I. After the war, he attended the University of Arizona and earned a bachelor of science degree in 1920.

McCreary died on November 5, 1984, in Festus, Missouri.

== Head coaching record ==
=== Football ===
Year	Team	Overall	Conference	Standing	Bowl/playoffs
Tempe Normal Owls / Tempe State Bulldogs / Arizona State Bulldogs (Independent) (1923–1929)
1923	Tempe Normal	4–2			
1924	Tempe Normal	6–1–1			
1925	Tempe State	6–2			
1926	Tempe State	4–1–1			
1927	Tempe State	2–3–1			
1928	Tempe State	3–2–1			
1929	Arizona State	0–6			
Tempe Normal / Tempe State / Arizona State:		25–17–4			
Total:		25–17–4			
