= Rudy Lavik =

American sports coach, college athletics administrator (1892–1979)

Biographical details
- Born: April 30, 1892; Forman, North Dakota, U.S.
- Died: September 29, 1979 (aged 87); Mesa, Arizona, U.S.

Playing career

Football
- 1916: Concordia (MN)
- 1917: Springfield YMCA
- 1919: Springfield YMCA

Basketball
- 1914–1917: Concordia (MN)
- 1919–1920: Springfield YMCA

Baseball
- c. 1915: Concordia (MN)
- Positions: Tackle (football); Center, guard (basketball); Pitcher (baseball)

Coaching career (HC unless noted)

Football
- 1920–1921: Concordia (MN)
- 1922–1924: Colorado College (assistant)
- 1925–1926: Colorado Agricultural (line)
- 1927–1932: Northern Arizona / Arizona State–Flagstaff
- 1933–1937: Arizona State

Basketball
- 1922–1925: Colorado College (assistant)
- 1925–1927: Colorado Agricultural
- 1927–1931: Northern Arizona / Arizona State–Flagstaff
- 1933–1935: Arizona State
- 1939–1948: Arizona State

Baseball
- 1923–1925: Colorado College
- 1927: Colorado Agricultural

Administrative career (AD unless noted)
- 1927–1933: Northern Arizona / Arizona State–Flagstaff
- 1933–1949: Arizona State

Head coaching record
- Overall: 43–43–9 (football); 152–156 (basketball)

Rudolph H. Lavik (April 30, 1892 – September 29, 1979) was an American football, basketball, baseball, and track and field coach, college athletics administrator, and educator. He served as the head football coach at Concordia College in Moorhead, Minnesota from 1920 to 1921, at Arizona State Teacher's College of Flagstaff—now known as Northern Arizona University—from 1927 to 1932, and at Arizona State Teachers College at Tempe—now known as Arizona State University—from 1933 to 1937, compiling a career college football head coaching record of 43–43–9. Lavik was also the head basketball coach at Arizona State Flagstaff (1927–1931), Colorado Agricultural College—now known as Colorado State University (1925–1927), and Arizona State Tempe (1933–1935, 1939–1948), tallying a career college basketball head coaching mark of 152–156. In addition, he served as the athletic director at Northern Arizona from 1927 to 1933 and Arizona State from 1933 to 1949. He remained a full-time member of Arizona State's faculty until 1962.

Lavik was a graduate of Concordia College in Moorhead, Minnesota and the International YMCA College—now known as Springfield College—in Springfield, Massachusetts. He played college football at both schools and also competed in other sports at Concordia.

== Early life, playing career, and education ==
Lavik was born on April 30, 1892 in Forman, North Dakota. Both of his parents were born in Norway. Lavik played football, basketball, baseball, and track in college, but he later recalled, "college scholarships were something I had never heard of. My father was a country minister with a salary of $600 a year, a free house and 10 children. All of them went to college, most became professional people and we were used to working our own way."

As a student-athlete, Lavik lettered in football, baseball, and basketball at Concordia College, and then football, basketball, and track and field at the International YMCA College. Lavik first attended Concordia College in Moorhead, Minnesota, where was elected captain of the football team in 1916. He majored in English and minored in history at Concordia. After graduating from Concordia, Lavik enrolled at the International YMCA College—now known as Springfield College—in Springfield, Massachusetts. He played football at Springfield at the tackle position, as he had at Concordia. Lavik also played basketball at Springfield at the center and guard positions and was a teammate of Carl Eggebrecht.

Lavik time's at Springfield was interrupted by military service during World War I. He served with the American Expeditionary Forces in the United States Army Corps of Engineers.

Lavik met his wife, Ethel Charlotte Larsen, at Concordia. The two were married in 1922.

== Coaching career ==
Lavik returned to Concordia in 1920 to begin his coaching career. In 1922, he was hired at Colorado College in Colorado Springs, Colorado to serve as head baseball coach and as an assistant in football and basketball under Telfer L. Mead.

In July 1927, Lavik attended a coaches clinic in Logan, Utah led by Knute Rockne, head football coach at the University of Notre Dame and Norwegian-American. Later that summer, Lavik was hired as athletic director and coach of all sports at Northern Arizona State Teacher's College of Flagstaff—now known as Northern Arizona University.

In 1933, Lavik was hired at athletic director, head football coach, and head basketball coach at Arizona State Teachers College—now known as Arizona State University—located in Tempe, Arizona. He retained his post as athletic director and chairman of the health and physical education department until 1949, when he was succeeded by Donn Kinzle.

== Later life and death ==
Lavik remained a full-time member of the Arizona State's faculty until 1962 and subsequently taught part-time at the school for several years. He also pitched batting practice for the Arizona State Sun Devils baseball team from 1955 to 1967.

Lavik continued to jog daily well into his 80s, running as much as two miles per day at Arizona State's track. He died on September 29, 1979, at Desert Samaritan Hospital in Mesa, Arizona, following a short illness.

Frank Kush, Arizona State's head football coach at the time of Lavik's death, said of Lavik, "I had a great deal of respect for him, not only as an individual, but as a teacher. In addition, he was an extremely fine football coach."

== Head coaching record ==
=== Football ===
Year	Team	Overall	Conference	Standing	Bowl/playoffs
Concordia Cobbers (Independent) (1920)
1920	Concordia	0–3			
Concordia Cobbers (Minnesota Intercollegiate Athletic Conference) (1921)
1921	Concordia	2–3–1	0–2	T–6th	
Concordia:		2–6–1	0–2		
Northern Arizona / Arizona State–Flagstaff Lumberjacks (Independent) (1927–1930)
1927	Northern Arizona	6–1–2			
1928	Northern Arizona	7–1			
1929	Arizona State–Flagstaff	5–0			
1930	Arizona State–Flagstaff	4–2–1			
Arizona State–Flagstaff Lumberjacks (Border Conference) (1931–1932)
1931	Arizona State–Flagstaff	3–5	1–3	5th	
1932	Arizona State–Flagstaff	3–2–2	2–2	T–3rd	
Northern Arizona / Arizona State–Flagstaff:		28–11–5	3–5		
Arizona State Bulldogs (Border Conference) (1933–1937)
1933	Arizona State	3–5	2–2	T–4th	
1934	Arizona State	4–3–1	2–2–1	4th	
1935	Arizona State	2–5–1	2–3–1	4th	
1936	Arizona State	4–5	2–3	4th	
1937	Arizona State	0–8–1	0–5	7th	
Arizona State:		13–26–3	8–15–2		
Total:		43–43–9			
