= Irish Field =

Former football stadium in Tempe, Arizona

- Full name: Irish Field
- Location: Tempe, Arizona
- Operator: Arizona State University
- Surface: Grass

Construction
- Built: 1927
- Opened: 1927
- Closed: 1935

Tenant
- Tempe Normal Owls (NCAA)

Irish Field served as the home to the Tempe Normal football team from 1927 to 1935 before being replaced by Goodwin Stadium in 1936.

== History ==
Tempe Normal gained accreditation as a 4-year institute in 1925. It was quickly decided the football team would need a new larger home. In 1927 ground was broken on the new stadium. The stadium was named for Fred Irish who was the head coach of the team for its first 8 seasons. Irish Field was located where the current Memorial Union sits on campus. Stadium lighting was added to Irish Field in 1930, allowing the team to play night games.
