= 1932 Buffalo Bulls football team =

American college football season

1932 Buffalo Bulls football
- Conference: Independent
- Record: 1–5–1
- Head coach: James B. Wilson (1st season)
- Captains: Bob Cleland; Chester Ward
- Home stadium: Rotary Field

1932 Eastern college football independents records
	Conf.			Overall
Team	W	L	T	W		L		T
No. 5 Colgate		–		9	–	0	–	0
Brown		–		7	–	1	–	0
Columbia		–		7	–	1	–	1
Pittsburgh		–		8	–	1	–	2
No. 8 Army		–		8	–	2	–	0
Drexel		–		5	–	1	–	1
Massachusetts State		–		7	–	2	–	0
Villanova		–		7	–	2	–	0
Duquesne		–		7	–	2	–	1
Fordham		–		6	–	2	–	0
Penn		–		6	–	2	–	0
Temple		–		5	–	1	–	2
Tufts		–		5	–	1	–	2
Cornell		–		5	–	2	–	1
Franklin & Marshall		–		4	–	2	–	1
Boston College		–		4	–	2	–	2
La Salle		–		4	–	2	–	2
Harvard		–		5	–	3	–	0
NYU		–		5	–	3	–	0
Washington & Jefferson		–		5	–	3	–	1
Manhattan		–		6	–	3	–	2
Carnegie Tech		–		4	–	3	–	2
Bucknell		–		4	–	4	–	1
Syracuse		–		4	–	4	–	1
Princeton		–		2	–	2	–	3
Yale		–		2	–	2	–	3
Boston University		–		2	–	3	–	2
Vermont		–		2	–	4	–	1
CCNY		–		2	–	5	–	0
Penn State		–		2	–	5	–	0
Rankings from Dickinson System

The 1932 Buffalo Bulls football team was an American football team that represented the University at Buffalo as an independent during the 1932 college football season. In their first season under head coach James B. Wilson, the Bulls compiled a 1–5–1 record and were outscored by a total of 208 to 19. The team played its home games at Rotary Field in Buffalo, New York.

== Schedule ==
Date	Opponent	Site	Result	Attendance	Source
September 23	at Cornell	Schoellkopf Field; Ithaca, NY	L 0–72		
October 1	at Harvard	Harvard Stadium; Boston, MA	L 0–66	3,000	
October 8	Alfred	Rotary Field; Buffalo, NY	T 6–6		
October 15	at Clarkson	Potsdam, NY	L 0–41		
October 22	Rochester	Rotary Field; Buffalo, NY	L 7–12		
October 29	Western Reserve	Rotary Field; Buffalo, NY	L 0–11		
November 12	Hobart	Rotary Field; Buffalo, NY	W 6–0		
