= 1932 Holy Cross Crusaders football team =

American college football season

1932 Holy Cross Crusaders football
- Conference: Independent
- Record: 6–2–2
- Head coach: John McEwan (3rd season; first 7 games); Bunny Corcoran (interim, final 3 games)
- Home stadium: Fitton Field

1932 Eastern college football independents records
| | Conf. | | | Overall |
| Team | W | L | T | W | | L | | T |
|---|---|---|---|---|---|---|---|---|
| No. 5 Colgate | | – | | 9 | – | 0 | – | 0 |
| Brown | | – | | 7 | – | 1 | – | 0 |
| Columbia | | – | | 7 | – | 1 | – | 1 |
| Pittsburgh | | – | | 8 | – | 1 | – | 2 |
| No. 8 Army | | – | | 8 | – | 2 | – | 0 |
| Drexel | | – | | 5 | – | 1 | – | 1 |
| Massachusetts State | | – | | 7 | – | 2 | – | 0 |
| Villanova | | – | | 7 | – | 2 | – | 0 |
| Duquesne | | – | | 7 | – | 2 | – | 1 |
| Fordham | | – | | 6 | – | 2 | – | 0 |
| Penn | | – | | 6 | – | 2 | – | 0 |
| Temple | | – | | 5 | – | 1 | – | 2 |
| Tufts | | – | | 5 | – | 1 | – | 2 |
| Cornell | | – | | 5 | – | 2 | – | 1 |
| Franklin & Marshall | | – | | 4 | – | 2 | – | 1 |
| Boston College | | – | | 4 | – | 2 | – | 2 |
| La Salle | | – | | 4 | – | 2 | – | 2 |
| Harvard | | – | | 5 | – | 3 | – | 0 |
| NYU | | – | | 5 | – | 3 | – | 0 |
| Washington & Jefferson | | – | | 5 | – | 3 | – | 1 |
| Manhattan | | – | | 6 | – | 3 | – | 2 |
| Carnegie Tech | | – | | 4 | – | 3 | – | 2 |
| Bucknell | | – | | 4 | – | 4 | – | 1 |
| Syracuse | | – | | 4 | – | 4 | – | 1 |
| Princeton | | – | | 2 | – | 2 | – | 3 |
| Yale | | – | | 2 | – | 2 | – | 3 |
| Boston University | | – | | 2 | – | 3 | – | 2 |
| Vermont | | – | | 2 | – | 4 | – | 1 |
| CCNY | | – | | 2 | – | 5 | – | 0 |
| Penn State | | – | | 2 | – | 5 | – | 0 |
Rankings from Dickinson System

The 1932 Holy Cross Crusaders football team was an American football team that represented the College of the Holy Cross as an independent during the 1932 college football season. Holy Cross was led by third-year head coach John McEwan for the first seven games of the season. McEwan was suspended and ultimately resigned after an argument with the team's trainer, Bart Sullivan, during Holy Cross's loss to Brown on November 5. Bunny Corcoran served as the team's interim head coach for the final three games of the season. Holy Cross finished the year with an overall record of 6–2–2. The Crusaders played their home games at Fitton Field in Worcester, Massachusetts.

== Schedule ==
| Date | Time | Opponent | Site | Result | Attendance | Source |
|---|---|---|---|---|---|---|
| September 24 | 3:00 p.m. | New River State | Fitton Field; Worcester, MA | W 13–6 | | |
| October 1 | 2:30 p.m. | Providence | Fitton Field; Worcester, MA | W 26–6 | | |
| October 8 | 2:00 p.m. | Maine | Fitton Field; Worcester, MA | W 32–6 | | |
| October 15 | | Detroit | Fitton Field; Worcester, MA | W 9–7 | | |
| October 22 | | at Rutgers | Neilson Field; New Brunswick, NJ | W 6–0 | | |
| October 29 | 2:00 p.m. | Catholic University | Fitton Field; Worcester, MA | W 8–0 | | |
| November 5 | | at Brown | Brown Stadium; Providence, RI | L 7–10 | 20,000 | |
| November 12 | 2:00 p.m. | at Harvard | Harvard Stadium; Boston, MA | L 0–7 | | |
| November 19 | | at Manhattan | Yankee Stadium; Bronx, NY | T 0–0 | 8,000 | |
| November 26 | 1:45 p.m. | Boston College | Fitton Field; Worcester, MA | T 0–0 | | |
All times are in Eastern time
