= 1932 Dartmouth Indians football team =

American college football season

1932 Dartmouth Indians football
- Conference: Independent
- Record: 4–4
- Head coach: Jackson Cannell (6th season)
- Captain: William Hoffman
- Home stadium: Memorial Field

1932 Eastern college football independents records
| | Conf. | | | Overall |
| Team | W | L | T | W | | L | | T |
|---|---|---|---|---|---|---|---|---|
| No. 5 Colgate | | – | | 9 | – | 0 | – | 0 |
| Brown | | – | | 7 | – | 1 | – | 0 |
| Columbia | | – | | 7 | – | 1 | – | 1 |
| Pittsburgh | | – | | 8 | – | 1 | – | 2 |
| No. 8 Army | | – | | 8 | – | 2 | – | 0 |
| Drexel | | – | | 5 | – | 1 | – | 1 |
| Massachusetts State | | – | | 7 | – | 2 | – | 0 |
| Villanova | | – | | 7 | – | 2 | – | 0 |
| Duquesne | | – | | 7 | – | 2 | – | 1 |
| Fordham | | – | | 6 | – | 2 | – | 0 |
| Penn | | – | | 6 | – | 2 | – | 0 |
| Temple | | – | | 5 | – | 1 | – | 2 |
| Tufts | | – | | 5 | – | 1 | – | 2 |
| Cornell | | – | | 5 | – | 2 | – | 1 |
| Franklin & Marshall | | – | | 4 | – | 2 | – | 1 |
| Boston College | | – | | 4 | – | 2 | – | 2 |
| La Salle | | – | | 4 | – | 2 | – | 2 |
| Harvard | | – | | 5 | – | 3 | – | 0 |
| NYU | | – | | 5 | – | 3 | – | 0 |
| Washington & Jefferson | | – | | 5 | – | 3 | – | 1 |
| Manhattan | | – | | 6 | – | 3 | – | 2 |
| Carnegie Tech | | – | | 4 | – | 3 | – | 2 |
| Bucknell | | – | | 4 | – | 4 | – | 1 |
| Syracuse | | – | | 4 | – | 4 | – | 1 |
| Princeton | | – | | 2 | – | 2 | – | 3 |
| Yale | | – | | 2 | – | 2 | – | 3 |
| Boston University | | – | | 2 | – | 3 | – | 2 |
| Vermont | | – | | 2 | – | 4 | – | 1 |
| CCNY | | – | | 2 | – | 5 | – | 0 |
| Penn State | | – | | 2 | – | 5 | – | 0 |
Rankings from Dickinson System

The 1932 Dartmouth Indians football team was an American football team that represented Dartmouth College as an independent during the 1932 college football season. In their sixth season under head coach Jackson Cannell, the Indians compiled a 4–4 record. William Hoffman was the team captain.

Wilbur Powers was the team's leading scorer, with 36 points, from six touchdowns.

Dartmouth played its home games at Memorial Field on the college campus in Hanover, New Hampshire.

== Schedule ==
| Date | Opponent | Site | Result | Attendance | Source |
|---|---|---|---|---|---|
| September 24 | Norwich | Memorial Field; Hanover, NH | W 73–0 | | |
| October 1 | Vermont | Memorial Field; Hanover, NH | W 32–0 | | |
| October 8 | Lafayette | Memorial Field; Hanover, NH | W 6–0 | 9,000 | |
| October 15 | at Penn | Franklin Field; Philadelphia, PA | L 7–14 | 50,000 | |
| October 22 | at Harvard | Harvard Stadium; Boston, MA (rivalry) | L 7–10 | 40,000 | |
| October 29 | at Yale | Yale Bowl; New Haven, CT | L 0–6 | 25,000 | |
| November 5 | New Hampshire | Memorial Field; Hanover, NH (rivalry) | W 25–0 | | |
| November 12 | at Cornell | Schoellkopf Field; Ithaca, NY (rivalry) | L 6–21 | 10,000 | |
