= 1932 college football rankings =

- Season: 1932
- Bowl season: 1932–33 bowl games
- End of season champions: USC (Note: per Boand System, Dunkel System, Houlgate System, Williamson System, Berryman QPRS, Billingsley Report, College Football Researchers Association, Helms Athletic Foundation, National Championship Foundation, Poling System, Sagarin Ratings Predictor method); Michigan (Note: per Dickinson System and Sagarin Ratings Elo chess method; co-champion (alongside Colgate) per Parke H. Davis (Spalding's Official Foot Ball Guide)); Colgate (not claimed) (Note: co-champion (alongside Michigan) per Parke H. Davis (Spalding's Official Foot Ball Guide))

The 1932 college football rankings ranked the best teams participating in the 1932 college football season. They included mathematical systems operated by William F. Boand, Frank G. Dickinson, and Dick Dunkel.

== Champions (by ranking) ==
All major rankings (both contemporary and retroactive) have identified the University of Southern California as the season's champions, with exception of Parke H. Davis's retroactive ranking for Spalding's Official Foot Ball Guide, which identified Pittsburgh and Purdue as co-champions.

- Berryman QPRS: USC
- Billingsley Report: USC
- Boand System: USC
- College Football Researchers Association: USC
- Parke H. Davis (Note: for Spalding's Official Foot Ball Guide): Colgate and Michigan (co-champions)
- Dickinson System: Michigan
- Dunkel System: USC
- Helms Athletic Foundation: USC
- Houlgate System: USC
- National Championship Foundation: USC
- Poling System: USC
- Sagarin Ratings Elo chess method: Michigan
- Sagarin Ratings Predictor method: USC
- Williamson System: USC

Note: Boand System, Dickinson System, Dunkel System, Houlgate System, and Williamson System were given contemporarily. All others were given retroactively

== Boand System ==
The Boand System was a mathematical ranking system developed by William F. Boand and sometimes billed as the "Azzi Ratem" (as I rate 'em) system. Boand's final rating, issued in January 1933, ranked the teams as follows:

1. USC - 166 points
2. Michigan - 158 points
3. Purdue - 151 points
4. Pittsburgh - 150 points
5. TCU - 143.4 points
6. Tennessee - 142.4 points
7. Notre Dame - 138.8 points
8. Colgate - 136.1 points
9. Auburn - 134.1 points
10. Centenary - 133.7 points

== Dickinson System ==
The Dickinson System was a mathematical rating system devised by University of Illinois economics professor Frank G. Dickinson.

1. Michigan - 28.47 points
2. USC - 26.81 points
3. Pittsburgh - 26.40 points
4. Purdue - 26.33 points
5. Colgate - 25.00 points
6. Ohio State - 23.60
7. Notre Dame - 20.44 points
8. Army - 20.00 points
9. Tennessee - 19.18 points
10. TCU - 19.12 points
11. Wisconsin - 18.80 points

== Dunkel System ==
The Dunkel System issued updated ratings for more than 600 teams throughout the season. The system was accurate in predicting the winner in 81.5% of games during the 1932 season. The top 100 teams in the final Dunkel rankings were as follows:

1. USC (10–0) - 65.5
2. Notre Dame (7–2) - 53.3
3. Purdue (7–0–1) - 50.1
4. Michigan (8–0) - 46.8
5. Colgate (9–0) - 46.4
6. Army (8–2) - 46.3
7. Ohio State (4–1–3) - 46.2
8. Tennessee (9–0–1) - 45.5
9. Wisconsin (6–1–1) - 45.4
10. Alabama (8–2) - 45.3
11. Washington (6–2–2) - 45.0
12. Minnesota (5–3) - 44.0
13. Pittsburgh (8–1–2) - 42.9
14. Northwestern - 42.8
15. California - 42.7
16. Stanford - 42.7
17. Fordham (6–2) - 42.5
18. TCU - 41.7
19. Penn - 41.7
20. Illinois - 41.7
21. Saint Mary's (6–2–1) - 41.6
22. Texas - 41.5
23. Michigan State - 40.8
24. Princeton - 40.7
25. Kansas - 40.2
26. Washington State - 40.2
27. Carnegie Tech - 39.8
28. Cornell - 39.8
29. NYU (5–3) - 39.7
30. Yale - 39.7
31. Oregon - 39.5
32. Detroit (8–2) - 39.4
33. Gonzaga (5–3) - 38.7
34. Tulane - 38.1
35. Nebraska - 37.9
36. Brown - 37.6
37. Oregon State - 37.6
38. Utah - 37.3
39. Auburn - 36.7
40. LSU - 36.7
41. Columbia State - 36.1
42. Georgia - 36.1
43. Vanderbilt - 36.1
44. Centenary (8–0–1) - 36.0
45. San Francisco - 36.0
46. Navy - 35.6
47. Catholic Univ. (6–1–1) - 35.6
48. Tulsa - 35.6
49. Duquesne - 35.5
50. Virginia Polytechnic - 35.5
51. Florida - 35.2
52. Rice - 35.2
53. Indiana - 34.7
54. Syracuse - 34.7
55. Georgia Tech - 34.6
56. Western Maryland (5–1–2) - 34.6
57. Villanova (7–2) - 34.3
58. Duke (7–3) - 34.1
59. George Washington (6–2–1) - 34.1
60. South Carolina (5–4–2) - 33.7
61. Marquette (4–3–1) - 33.6
62. Kentucky (4–5) - 33.6
63. Oklahoma (4–4–1) - 33.2
64. North Dakota (7–1) - 33.1
65. Kansas Aggies - 33.1
66. Miami (OH) (7–1) - 33.1
67. Dartmouth (4–4) - 33.0
68. Rutgers (6–3–1) - 33.0
69. Harvard (5–3) - 32.8
70. Chicago (3–4–1) - 32.7
71. Holy Cross (6–2–2) - 32.5
72. Washington & Jefferson (5–3–1) - 32.4
73. Furman (8–1) - 32.2
74. Idaho (3–5) - 32.2
75. Lafayette (3–5) - 32.1
76. Boston College (4–2–2) - 31.8
77. NC State (6–1–2) - 31.5
78. Ohio (7–2) - 31.4
79. BYU (8–1) - 31.3
80. West Virginia (5–5) - 31.3
81. Mercer (6–2) - 31.0
82. Loyola (Los Angeles) (4–4) - 30.9
83. Baylor (3–5–1) - 30.9
84. Olympic Club (CA) - 30.8
85. Jefferson (TX) (8–0) - 30.5
86. SMU (3–7–2) - 30.4
87. Ole Miss (5–6) - 30.0
88. Oklahoma A&M (9–1–2) - 30.0
89. Marshall (6–2–1) - 29.9
90. Providence (4–2–2) - 29.9
91. Whittier (10–1) - 29.9
92. Michigan State Normal (5–2) - 29.7
93. Temple (5–1–2) - 29.6
94. Arkansas (1–6–2) - 29.5
95. West Coast Navy - 29.5
96. Creighton (5–2–1) - 29.2
97. Colorado College (4–4) - 29.1
98. Saint Louis (5–2) - 29.0
99. South Dakota (4–5–1) - 29.0
100. Colorado Aggies (4–3–1) - 28.8

== Houlgate System ==
The Houlgate System was developed by USC alumnus and engineer Deke Houlgate. His final rankings, issued in December 1932, were as follows:

1. USC - 35 points
2. Pittsburgh - 34 points
3. Michigan - 32 points

== Williamson System ==
The Williamson System was created by Paul B. Williamson, a consulting engineer, geologist, and Auburn alumnus. His final 1932 rankings were as follows:

1. USC
2. Michigan
3. Auburn
4. Pittsburgh
5. Purdue
6. Tennessee
7. Colgate
8. TCU
9. Centenary
10. Notre Dame

== See also ==
- 1932 College Football All-America Team
