= John Burke =

John Burke may refer to:

== Government and politics ==
- John mac Richard Mór Burke, 10th Clanricarde or Mac William Uachtar (died 1536), Irish chieftain and noble
- John Burke, 9th Earl of Clanricarde (1642–1722), Irish soldier and peer
- John Smith de Burgh, 11th Earl of Clanricarde or John Smith Burke (1720–1782), Irish peer
- John Burke, Baron Leitrim or John "na Seamer" Burke or Seán mac an Iarla a Búrc, 1st Baron Leitrim (died 1583), Irish noble
- Sir John Burke, 2nd Baronet (1782–1847), Irish soldier and MP for Galway County
- John Burke (North Dakota politician) (1859–1937), 10th Governor of North Dakota and Treasurer of the United States
  - John Burke (Fairbanks), a 1963 bronze sculpture
- John H. Burke (politician) (1894–1951), American lawyer, real estate broker, and politician
- John Francis Burke (1923–2006), Canadian politician
- John Burke (mayor) (born 1946), mayor of Porirua City New Zealand, 1983–1998
- John R. Burke (1924–1993), U.S. ambassador to Guyana
- John P. Burke (born 1954), American politician in Massachusetts
- John Burke (Rhode Island politician) (born 1960), member of the Rhode Island Senate

== Military ==
- John Burke (spy) (1830–1871), Confederate spy in the American Civil War
- John Burke (colonel) (1838–1914), officer in the Union Army during the American Civil War
- John Luddy Burke (1909–2003), United States Navy officer and business executive
- John Oge Burke (died 1601), Irish gentleman and soldier

== Music ==
- Johnny Burke (lyricist) (1908–1964), American songwriter
- John Burke (composer) (1951–2020), Canadian composer
- Johnny Burke (Newfoundland songwriter) (1851–1930), Newfoundland songwriter
- Johnny Burke (Canadian singer) (1940–2017), Canadian country singer
- John Burke (American pianist) (born 1988), American composer & pianist

== Sports ==
- John Burke (1900s pitcher) (1877–1950), U.S. baseball player for the New York Giants
- John Burke (1990s pitcher) (born 1970), U.S. baseball player for the Colorado Rockies and the University of Florida
- John Burke (American football) (born 1971), played for the New England Patriots, New York Jets and San Diego Chargers
- John Burke (footballer, fl. 1927–1935), Irish footballer from Tipperary
- Johnny Burke (footballer) (1911–1987), Irish footballer
- John Burke (footballer, born 1956), Irish footballer from Dublin
- John Burke (footballer, born 1962), Scottish footballer for Exeter City and Chester City
- John Burke (rugby league, born 1948) (1948–2013), rugby league footballer of the 1970s for Leeds, Keighley
- John Burke (rugby league, born 1957), rugby league footballer of the 1970s for Wigan, and Workington Town
- Jack Burke Sr. (John Burke, 1888–1943), American golfer
- Jack Burke Jr. (John Burke, 1923–2024), American golfer
- John H. Burke (coach), American college football and basketball coach
- John H. Burke Jr., his son, American basketball coach

== Others ==
- John MacSeonin Burke, archbishop of Tuam, 1441–1450
- John J. Burke (1875–1936), Paulist priest and editor of the Catholic World
- John Burke (genealogist) (1786–1848), Irish genealogist, founder of Burke's Peerage
- Sir John Bernard Burke (1814–1892), British genealogist
- John Edward Burke (1871–1947), shipowner in Queensland, Australia
- John F. Burke (1922–2011), American medical researcher and co-inventor of synthetic skin in 1981
- Arizona John Burke (1842–1917), American publicist, press agent and author
- John P. Burke (unionist) (1884–1966), American labor unionist and socialist politician
- John Burke (author) (1922–2011), English writer of novels and short stories
- John Burke (artist) (1946–2006), Irish artist
- John Burke (photographer) (c. 1843–1900), British photographer
- John M. Burke (born 2001), American chess player
- John Burke, president of Trek Bicycle Corporation
- SS John Burke, an American Liberty Ship destroyed in a kamikaze attack

== See also ==
- Jack Burke (disambiguation)
- John Bourke (disambiguation)
