= Soleau =

Soleau is a surname. Notable people with the surname include:

- Bob Soleau (1941–2014), American football player
- Charles R. Soleau (1909–1963), American football player and coach
