= Jack Burke =

Jack Burke may refer to:

- Jack Burke Jr. (born 1923), American golfer
- Jack Burke Sr. (1888–1943), American golfer
- Jack Burke Jr. (politician), member of the Florida House of Representatives
- Jack Burke (boxer) (1875–1942), American boxer known for fighting the longest boxing match in history
- Jack Burke (footballer) (1918–2004), Australian footballer, who played for Hawthorn
- Jack Burke (cyclist) (born 1995), Canadian cyclist
- Jack Burke (hurdler) (born 1927), American hurdler, 1950 All-American for the Washington Huskies track and field team

== See also ==
- John Burke (disambiguation)
