= 1932 New Hampshire Wildcats football team =

American college football season

1932 New Hampshire Wildcats football
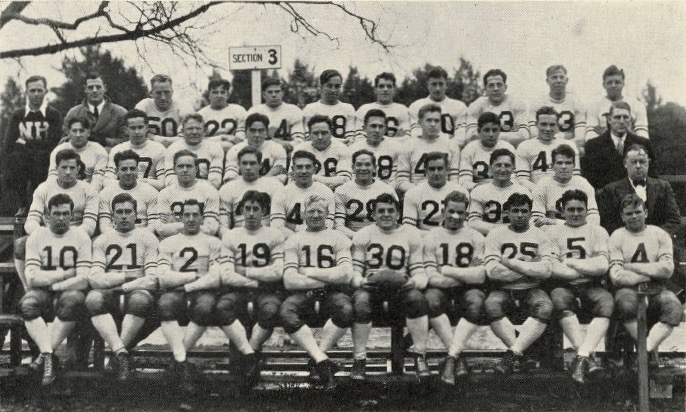
- The 1932 squad was the first New Hampshire Wildcats football team to appear in The Granite wearing numbers on the front of their uniforms.
- Conference: New England Conference
- Record: 3–4–1 (1–0–1 New England)
- Head coach: Butch Cowell (17th season)
- Captain: Arthur Learmonth
- Home stadium: Memorial Field

1932 New England Conference football standings
	Conf.					Overall
Team	W		L		T	W		L		T
Maine $	2	–	0	–	1	5	–	1	–	1
New Hampshire	1	–	0	–	1	3	–	4	–	1
Rhode Island State	0	–	1	–	1	2	–	5	–	1
Connecticut	0	–	2	–	1	0	–	6	–	2
$ – Conference champion

The 1932 New Hampshire Wildcats football team was an American football team that represented the University of New Hampshire as a member of the New England Conference during the 1932 college football season. In its 17th season under head coach William "Butch" Cowell, (Note: This was Cowell's 18th year and 17th season as head coach, as the school did not field a team in 1918 due to World War I.) the team played its home games in Durham, New Hampshire, at Memorial Field. (Note: Memorial Field remains in use by the New Hampshire women's field hockey team.) The team compiled a 3–4–1 record, (Note: New Hampshire's varsity record in 1932 was 3–4–1. College Football Data Warehouse lists an additional loss, to Saint Anselm; however, contemporary news reports are clear that it was New Hampshire's freshman team that played Saint Anselm.) and were outscored by their opponents, 110–105. All four losses came in away games, while the team recorded three wins and a tie in Durham.

== Schedule ==
Date	Opponent	Site	Result	Attendance	Source
October 1	at Boston University*	Nickerson Field (Note: This was a different venue than the like-named Nickerson Field in Boston, used by BU in later years.); Weston, MA	L 6–13		
October 8	at Harvard*	Harvard Stadium; Boston, MA	L 0–40		
October 15	Maine	Memorial Field; Durham, NH (rivalry)	T 7–7		
October 22	Vermont*^{†}	Memorial Field; Durham, NH	W 22–6		
October 29	Lowell Textile* (Note: Lowell Textile is now University of Massachusetts Lowell.)	Memorial Field; Durham, NH	W 20–7		
November 5	at Dartmouth*	Memorial Field; Hanover, NH (rivalry)	L 0–25		
November 12	at Springfield*	Pratt Field; Springfield, MA	L 7–12		
November 19	Connecticut	Memorial Field; Durham, NH	W 43–0		
*Non-conference game; ^{†}Homecoming; Source:

Boston University was coached by Myles Lane, who had played ice hockey with the Stanley Cup-winning 1928–29 Boston Bruins, and was inducted to the College Football Hall of Fame in 1970.

Wildcat captain Arthur Learmonth, who had been born in Orkney, Scotland, would go on to earn a master's degree in education; he served in the United States Navy, and worked for the United States Department of Labor for 35 years—he died in February 2004 at age 93.
