= 1932 West Virginia Wesleyan Bobcats football team =

American college football season

1932 West Virginia Wesleyan Bobcats football
- Conference: West Virginia Athletic Conference
- Record: 4–4–1 (2–1–1 WVAC)
- Head coach: Cebe Ross (8th season)

1932 West Virginia Athletic Conference football standings
	Conf.					Overall
Team	W		L		T	W		L		T
Fairmont State $	4	–	1	–	0	5	–	2	–	1
Glenville State	3	–	1	–	1	4	–	2	–	1
West Liberty State	3	–	1	–	0	7	–	2	–	0
West Virginia Wesleyan	2	–	1	–	1	4	–	4	–	1
Concord	1	–	3	–	1	4	–	4	–	1
Salem	1	–	5	–	0	2	–	5	–	0
Morris Harvey	0	–	4	–	0	0	–	9	–	0
Marshall *	3	–	0	–	0	6	–	2	–	1
Davis & Elkins *	2	–	0	–	0	6	–	5	–	0
Potomac State *	2	–	0	–	1	4	–	1	–	1
New River State *	1	–	1	–	0	3	–	3	–	1
Morehead State *	0	–	1	–	0	4	–	2	–	1
Shepherd *	0	–	2	–	0	4	–	3	–	0
Bethany (WV) *	0	–	2	–	0	0	–	5	–	2
$ – Conference champion; * – Did not qualify for conference standings Ties did not count in conference standings.

The 1932 West Virginia Wesleyan Bobcats football team represented West Virginia Wesleyan College as a member of the West Virginia Athletic Conference (WVAC) during the 1932 college football season. Led by eighth-year head coach Cebe Ross, the Bobcats compiled an overall record of 4–4–1 with a mark of 2–1–1 in conference play, placing fourth in the WVAC.

== Schedule ==
Date	Time	Opponent	Site	Result	Attendance	Source
October 1		at Washington & Jefferson*	Washington, PA	L 0–20		
October 8		Bethany (WV)	Buckhannon, WV	W 43–6		
October 15		at West Virginia*	Mountaineer Field; Morgantown, WV	L 0–14	5,000	
October 21	8:15 p.m.	at Duquesne*	Forbes Field; Pittsburgh, PA	W 7–6	7,000	
October 28		Salem	Buckhannon, WV	W 14–0		
November 5		Glenville State	Buckhannon, WV	T 21–21		
November 12	2:00 p.m.	at Georgetown*	Griffith Stadium; Washington, DC	W 14–0	5,000	
November 19		at Army*	Michie Stadium; West Point, NY	L 0–7		
November 24		at Marshall	Fairfield Stadium; Huntington, WV	L 0–22		
*Non-conference game; All times are in Eastern time
