= 1932 Connecticut Aggies football team =

American college football season

1932 Connecticut Aggies football
- Conference: New England Conference
- Record: 0–6–2 (0–2–1 New England)
- Head coach: Sumner Dole (10th season)
- Home stadium: Gardner Dow Athletic Fields

1932 New England Conference football standings
	Conf.					Overall
Team	W		L		T	W		L		T
Maine $	2	–	0	–	1	5	–	1	–	1
New Hampshire	1	–	0	–	1	3	–	4	–	1
Rhode Island State	0	–	1	–	1	2	–	5	–	1
Connecticut	0	–	2	–	1	0	–	6	–	2
$ – Conference champion

The 1932 Connecticut Aggies football team represented Connecticut Agricultural College, now the University of Connecticut, in the 1932 college football season. The Aggies were led by tenth-year head coach Sumner Dole, and completed the season with a record of 0–6–2.

== Schedule ==
Date	Opponent	Site	Result	Attendance	Source
October 1	at Maine	Alumni Field; Orono, ME	L 0–13		
October 8	at Wesleyan*	Andrus Field; Middletown, CT	L 2–24		
October 15	Massachusetts State*	Gardner Dow Athletic Fields; Storrs, CT (rivalry)	L 0–39		
October 22	Trinity (CT)*	Gardner Dow Athletic Fields; Storrs, CT	L 0–7		
October 29	Tufts*	Gardner Dow Athletic Fields; Storrs, CT	L 6–22		
November 5	at Coast Guard*	Jones Field; New London, CT	T 0–0		
November 12	Rhode Island State	Gardner Dow Athletic Fields; Storrs, CT (rivalry)	T 19–19	5,000	
November 19	at New Hampshire	Memorial Field; Durham, NH	L 0–43		
*Non-conference game
