= Charles R. Soleau =

American football player and coach (1909–1963)

Biographical details
- Born: October 24, 1909; Newark, New Jersey, U.S.
- Died: April 18, 1963 (aged 52); New Rochelle, New York, U.S.

Playing career
- 1931–1933: Colgate
- Position: Quarterback

Coaching career (HC unless noted)
- 1934–1935: Lafayette (freshmen)
- 1936–1941: Amherst (backfield/freshmen)
- 1942: North Carolina Pre-Flight (assistant)
- 1946–1947: Franklin & Marshall

Head coaching record
- Overall: 7–7–1

Accomplishments and honors

Awards
- Second-team All-American (1932)

Charles Richard Soleau (October 24, 1909 – April 18, 1963) was an American college football player and coach. He served as the head football coach at Franklin & Marshall College in Lancaster, Pennsylvania from 1946 to 1947, compiling a record of 7–7–1. Soleau played as a quarterback at Colgate University from 1931 to 1933. He was the father of National Football League (NFL) player Bob Soleau.

== Early life and playing career ==
A native of Montclair, New Jersey, Soleau attended the Peddie School, a prep school in Hightstown, New Jersey.

Soleau played college football as a quarterback at Colgate University from 1931 to 1933 under head coach Andrew Kerr. He was second-team selection by the United Press on the 1932 All-America college football team. He was also named to the 1932 "All-Scout" team by Boys' Life magazine. Parke H. Davis recognized the 1932 team as national champion.

== Coaching career ==
After graduating from Colgate in 1934, Soleau began his coaching career at Lafayette College, serving as freshman football coach for two seasons. In 1936, he went to Amherst College, where he was backfield coach for the football team until 1941. While serving in the United States Navy during World War II, Soleau served as an assistant coach for the North Carolina Pre-Flight Cloudbusters under head coach Jim Crowley.

In 1946, Soleau was appointed head football coach at the Franklin & Marshall College in Lancaster, Pennsylvania. He was also an associated professor of physical education at Franklin & Marshall before resigning in early 1948. He led the Franklin & Marshall Diplomats football team to a record of 7–7–1 in two seasons, 1946 and 1947.

== Later life and death ==
In 1948, Soleau went into the insurance business. He worked for the First Colony Insurance Company of Lynchburg, Virginia as a life insurance underwriter. Soleau died on April 18, 1963, at New Rochelle Hospital in New Rochelle, New York, following a short illness. He was interred at Kensico Cemetery in Valhalla, New York.

== Head coaching record ==
=== College football ===
Year	Team	Overall	Conference	Standing	Bowl/playoffs
Franklin & Marshall Diplomats (Independent) (1946–1947)
1946	Franklin & Marshall	3–4			
1947	Franklin & Marshall	4–3–1			
Franklin & Marshall:		7–7–1			
Total:		7–7–1			
