= 1932 Lehigh Engineers football team =

American college football season

1932 Lehigh Engineers football
- Conference: Middle Three Conference
- Record: 2–6–1 (0–2 Middle Three)
- Head coach: A. Austin Tate (5th season)
- Captain: Charles Halsted
- Home stadium: Taylor Stadium

1932 Middle Three Conference football standings
	Conf.					Overall
Team	W		L		T	W		L		T
Rutgers $	2	–	0	–	0	6	–	3	–	1
Lafayette	1	–	1	–	0	3	–	5	–	0
Lehigh	0	–	2	–	0	2	–	6	–	1
$ – Conference champion

The 1932 Lehigh Engineers football team was an American football team that represented Lehigh University during the 1932 college football season. In its fifth season under head coach A. Austin Tate, the team compiled a 2–6–1 record, and lost both games against its Middle Three Conference rivals. Lehigh played home games at Taylor Stadium in Bethlehem, Pennsylvania.

== Schedule ==
Date	Opponent	Site	Result	Attendance	Source
September 24	Drexel*	Taylor Stadium; Bethlehem, PA	T 13–13		
October 1	at Columbia*	Baker Field; New York, NY	L 6–41	20,000	
October 8	Pennsylvania Military*	Taylor Stadium; Bethlehem, PA	W 7–0		
October 15	at Johns Hopkins*	Homewood Field; Baltimore, MD	L 6–12	3,500	
October 22	at Penn*	Franklin Field; Philadelphia, PA	L 6–33	20,000	
October 29	Muhlenberg*	Taylor Stadium; Bethlehem, PA	W 25–6	7,000	
November 5	at Princeton*	Palmer Stadium; Princeton, NJ	L 0–53	20,000	
November 12	Rutgers	Taylor Stadium; Bethlehem, PA	L 6–37	5,000	
November 19	at Lafayette	Fisher Field; Easton, PA (rivalry)	L 6–25	10,000	
*Non-conference game
