= 1932 Maine Black Bears football team =

American college football season

1932 Maine Black Bears football

New England champion MIAA champion
- Conference: New England Conference, Maine Intercollegiate Athletic Association
- Record: 5–1–1 (2–0–1 New England, 3–0 MIAA)
- Head coach: Fred Brice (12th season)
- Home stadium: Alumni Field

1932 New England Conference football standings
| | Conf. | | | | | Overall |
| Team | W | | L | | T | W | | L | | T |
|---|---|---|---|---|---|---|---|---|---|---|
| Maine $ | 2 | – | 0 | – | 1 | 5 | – | 1 | – | 1 |
| New Hampshire | 1 | – | 0 | – | 1 | 3 | – | 4 | – | 1 |
| Rhode Island State | 0 | – | 1 | – | 1 | 2 | – | 5 | – | 1 |
| Connecticut | 0 | – | 2 | – | 1 | 0 | – | 6 | – | 2 |
$ – Conference champion

The 1932 Maine Black Bears football team was an American football team that represented the University of Maine as a member of the New England Conference and Maine Intercollegiate Athletic Association during the 1932 college football season. In its 12th season under head coach Fred Brice, the team compiled a 5–1–1 record (2–0–1 against New England and 3–0 against MIAA conference opponents) and won the conference championship. The team played its home games at Alumni Field in Orono, Maine. Julius Pike was the team captain.

== Schedule ==
| Date | Time | Opponent | Site | Result | Source |
|---|---|---|---|---|---|
| September 24 | | Rhode Island State | Alumni Field; Orono, ME | W 12–0 | |
| October 1 | | Connecticut | Alumni Field; Orono, ME | W 33–0 | |
| October 8 | 2:00 p.m. | at Holy Cross* | Fitton Field; Worcester, MA | L 6–32 | |
| October 15 | | at New Hampshire | Memorial Field; Durham, NH (rivalry) | T 7–7 | |
| October 22 | | Bates | Alumni Field; Orono, ME | W 6–0 | |
| October 29 | | Colby | Alumni Field; Orono, ME | W 6–0 | |
| November 5 | | at Bowdoin | Whittier Field; Brunswick, ME | W 7–6 | |
*Non-conference game; All times are in Eastern time
