= John Bourke =

John Bourke may refer to:

- John Bourke (Australian footballer) (born c. 1963), Australian footballer
- John Bourke (Australian politician) (1901–1970), Australian politician
- John Bourke (Scottish footballer) (born 1953), Scottish footballer
- John Bourke, 1st Earl of Mayo (c. 1705–1790), Irish politician and peer
- John Bourke, 2nd Earl of Mayo (c. 1729–1792), Irish politician and peer
- John Bourke, 4th Earl of Mayo (1766–1849), Irish politician and peer
- John Conway Bourke (1815– 1902), Australian mailman
- John Gregory Bourke (1846–1896), American Civil War medal of honor recipient
- John Philip Bourke (1860–1914), Australian poet
- Sir John Bourke of Brittas (1550–1607), Irish Roman Catholic, hanged for refusing to renounce his faith

== See also ==
- John Burke (disambiguation)
