= 1932 Rhode Island State Rams football team =

American college football season

1932 Rhode Island State Rams football
- Conference: New England Conference
- Record: 2–5–1 (0–1–1 New England)
- Head coach: Frank Keaney (13th season)

1932 New England Conference football standings
	Conf.					Overall
Team	W		L		T	W		L		T
Maine $	2	–	0	–	1	5	–	1	–	1
New Hampshire	1	–	0	–	1	3	–	4	–	1
Rhode Island State	0	–	1	–	1	2	–	5	–	1
Connecticut	0	–	2	–	1	0	–	6	–	2
$ – Conference champion

The 1932 Rhode Island Rams football team was an American football team that represented Rhode Island State College (later renamed the University of Rhode Island) as a member of the New England Conference during the 1932 college football season. In its 13th season under head coach Frank Keaney, the team compiled a 2–5–1 record (0–1–1 against conference opponents) and finished in third place in the conference.

== Schedule ==
Date	Opponent	Site	Result	Source
September 24	at Maine	Orono, ME	L 0–12	
October 1	at Brown*	Providence, RI (rivalry)	L 0–19	
October 8	Boston University*	Kingston, RI	L 0–7	
October 15	Bates*	Kingston, RI	L 0–6	
October 22	Arnold*	Kingston, RI	W 6–0	
October 29	at Coast Guard*	New London, CT	W 13–0	
November 5	Worcester Tech^{†}	Kingston, RI	L 0–12	
November 12	at Connecticut State*	Storrs, CT (rivalry)	T 19–19	
*Non-conference game; ^{†}Homecoming
