= Andrew Kerr =

American football, basketball, and track and field coach

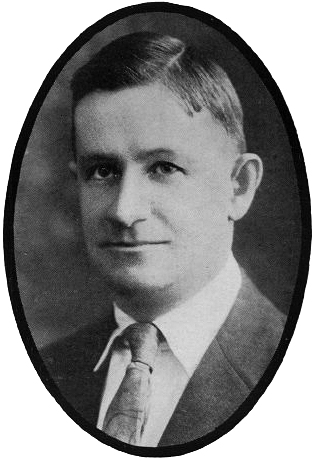
- Kerr at the University of Pittsburgh, c. 1920

Biographical details
- Born: October 7, 1878; Cheyenne, Wyoming, U.S.
- Died: February 17, 1969 (aged 90); Tucson, Arizona, U.S.

Coaching career (HC unless noted)

Football
- 1913–1921: Pittsburgh (assistant)
- 1922–1923: Stanford
- 1924–1925: Stanford (assistant)
- 1926–1928: Washington & Jefferson
- 1929–1946: Colgate
- 1947–1949: Lebanon Valley

Basketball
- 1921–1922: Pittsburgh
- 1922–1926: Stanford
- 1926–1928: Washington & Jefferson

Track and field
- 1913–1922: Pittsburgh

Head coaching record
- Overall: 137–71–14 (football); 70–39 (basketball)

Accomplishments and honors

Awards
- Amos Alonzo Stagg Award (1963)
- College Football Hall of Fame; Inducted in 1951 (profile)

Andrew Kerr IV (October 7, 1878 – February 17, 1969) was an American football, basketball, and track and field coach. He served as the head football coach at Stanford University (1922–1923), Washington & Jefferson College (1926–1928), Colgate University (1929–1946), and Lebanon Valley College (1947–1949), compiling a career college football record of 137–71–14. His 1932 Colgate team went a perfect 9–0, was not scored upon, and was named a national champion by Parke H. Davis. Kerr was also the head basketball coach at the University of Pittsburgh for one season (1921–1922) and at Stanford for four seasons (1922–1926), tallying a career college basketball mark of 54–26. In addition, he coached track and field at Pittsburgh from 1913 to 1921. Kerr was inducted into the College Football Hall of Fame in 1951. Colgate's home football stadium, Andy Kerr Stadium, was dedicated in his honor in 1966.

== Early years ==
Andy Kerr was born in Cheyenne, Wyoming, to Andrew and Mary Elizabeth Kerr. His family moved east to Carlisle, Pennsylvania, where Kerr attended secondary school. He attended Dickinson College, where he played baseball and ran track. He then moved to the University of Pittsburgh, where he served as the head track and field coach from 1913 until 1922, as an assistant football coach, and, for one season, the head basketball coach, leading that squad to a 12–8 record in 1921–22. While at Pitt as an assistant football coach also in charge of the freshman football squad, he served as a member of the staff of head coach Pop Warner.

== Football head coaching career ==
In 1922, Warner accepted the head coaching job at Stanford University. Due to Warner's contractual obligations at Pitt, he sent Kerr to act as Stanford's head coach until his arrival in 1924. Kerr posted an 11–7 record in his two seasons as head and remained with Warner as an assistant for two more seasons. He also coached the Stanford men's basketball team from 1922 to 1926.

Andy Kerr served as the 23rd head football coach at Colgate University. He held that position for eighteen seasons, from 1929 until 1946. His overall coaching record at Colgate was 95–50–7. Kerr's 95 wins are the second most in program in history. His 1932 Colgate squad was undefeated, and did not allow a single point all season. The team expected to be invited to play in the Rose Bowl but when Pitt got the invitation instead, he observed that his Colgate team was "undefeated, untied, unscored upon, and uninvited." he died in 1969 in Tucson Arizona of complications from heart failure

== Head coaching record ==
=== Football ===
Year	Team	Overall	Conference	Standing	Bowl/playoffs
Stanford (Pacific Coast Conference) (1922–1923)
1922	Stanford	4–5	1–3	T–5th	
1923	Stanford	7–2	2–2	T–3rd	
Stanford:		11–7	3–5		
Washington & Jefferson Presidents (Independent) (1926–1928)
1926	Washington & Jefferson	7–1–1			
1927	Washington & Jefferson	7–0–2			
1928	Washington & Jefferson	2–5–2			
Washington & Jefferson:		16–6–5			
Colgate Red Raiders (Independent) (1929–1946)
1929	Colgate	8–1			
1930	Colgate	9–1			
1931	Colgate	8–1			
1932	Colgate	9–0			
1933	Colgate	6–1–1			
1934	Colgate	7–1			
1935	Colgate	7–3			
1936	Colgate	6–3			
1937	Colgate	3–5			
1938	Colgate	2–5			
1939	Colgate	2–5–1			
1940	Colgate	5–3			
1941	Colgate	3–3–2			
1942	Colgate	6–2–1			
1943	Colgate	5–3–1			
1944	Colgate	2–5			
1945	Colgate	3–4–1			
1946	Colgate	4–4			
Colgate:		95–50–7			
Lebanon Valley Flying Dutchmen (Independent) (1947–1949)
1947	Lebanon Valley	5–2–1			
1948	Lebanon Valley	5–3–1			
1949	Lebanon Valley	5–3			
Lebanon Valley:		15–8–2			
Total:		137–71–14			
