= Colgate–Syracuse football rivalry =

American college football rivalry

- Colgate Raiders Syracuse Orange
- First meeting: November 7, 1891; Colgate, 22–16
- Latest meeting: September 12, 2025; Syracuse, 66–24
- Next meeting: 2028

Statistics
- Total meetings: 69
- All-time series: Syracuse, 33–31–5
- Largest victory: Syracuse, 71–0 (1959)
- Longest win streak: Syracuse, 18 (1951–present)
- Current win streak: Syracuse, 18 (1951–present)

Locations of Colgate and Syracuse

The Colgate–Syracuse football rivalry is an American college football rivalry between the Colgate Raiders and Syracuse Orange. The two schools are located 38 miles apart from each other in Central New York. The two teams have met 69 times, and despite Colgate not recording a victory since 1950, Syracuse leads the all-time series 33–31–5. The game has been infrequently played since the NCAA's divisional split in 1978, which placed Colgate in Division I-AA and Syracuse in Division I-A.

== History ==
Colgate University (located in Madison County) and Syracuse University (located in neighboring Onondaga County) are both private institutions, and their close proximity to each other quickly lead to a natural rivalry in athletics between the two schools. Colgate and Syracuse first played each other in football in 1891, with Colgate recording a 22–16 victory. The Red Raiders would go on the win 12 of the first 16 games in the series. Colgate's early dominance in the series quickly gave rise to the legend of the Hoodoo (a play on a corruption of the word Voodoo). The Hoodoo legend was based on a story that, during the construction of Syracuse's Archbold Stadium in 1907, a Colgate student snuck onto the construction site and buried a varsity maroon "C" sweater in the drying cement, thereby cursing Syracuse to failure against the Red Raiders. Colgate students even went so far as to rent planes to drop "Hoodoo" flyers to litter the Syracuse campus, prompting Syracuse students to respond by dropping their own flyers on the Colgate campus. After Syracuse students upped the ante by pouring orange dye into Colgate's Taylor Lake, Colgate students responded by renting a plane to drop red paint onto Archbold Stadium.

By the late 1950s, Syracuse had established itself as a major power in Eastern college football, while Colgate continued to lag behind and the games became increasingly one-sided. Following the 1961 contest, Colgate terminated the series, in order to focus on playing smaller, peer institutions. Following the NCAA's I-A/I-AA split in 1978, the rivalry was intermittently renewed in the 1980s, with Syracuse comfortably winning all three games played in the decade. In 2010, the rivalry was renewed again after a 23-year absence, with Syracuse recording a 42–7 victory. The series resumed again in 2016, when Syracuse hosted Colgate in a game played in the Carrier Dome, which Syracuse won 33–7. The series was scheduled to resume in 2020 but was canceled due to the COVID-19 pandemic. The series did resume in 2023, a Syracuse 65–0 win in which Syracuse took the lead in the all-time series for the first time in series history. The Orange extended their winning streak to 18 games with a 66–24 win in 2025.

== Notable games ==
- 1891: The first ever meeting between the two schools resulted in a 22–16 Colgate victory.
- 1897 – The Tackle: Colgate was hosting the game in Hamilton. With the game tied, a Colgate alumnus who was working as a newspaper reporter covering the game, ran out onto the field and tackled a Syracuse player who had broken away and was about to score the go-ahead touchdown. The game eventually ended in a 6–6 tie. The series would be suspended until 1902, at which point every subsequent game in the series would be played in Syracuse.
- 1916: Colgate defeats Syracuse 15–0 en route to the program's first national championship season.
- 1932: Colgate went into Archbold Stadium and shut out the Orangemen 16–0 en route to a perfect season and the program's second national championship season.
- 1950 – Colgate's Last Stand: Colgate pulls out a 19–14 victory over Syracuse in Archbold Stadium, Colgate's last victory in the series to date.
- 1956: Jim Brown scores an NCAA-record 43 points in Syracuse's 61–7 victory over Colgate.
- 1959: #1 ranked Syracuse hosted Colgate in front of 31,000 fans at Archbold Stadium and dominated the Red Raiders 71–0 en route to a perfect season and only national championship season to date.
- 1961 – The End: Syracuse records a 51–8 victory over Colgate in the last regularly scheduled annual meeting between the two schools. Colgate and Syracuse would not play again in football for the next 20 years.
- 2010: Colgate and Syracuse met on the gridiron for the first time since 1987, a 42–7 Syracuse victory in the Carrier Dome.

== Game results ==
Colgate victories	Syracuse victories	Tie games

No.	Date	Location	Winner	Score
1	November 7, 1891	Syracuse, NY	Colgate	22–16
2	October 26, 1893	Hamilton, NY	Colgate	58–0
3	October 6, 1894	Hamilton, NY	Colgate	32–8
4	November 9, 1895	Syracuse, NY	Syracuse	4–0
5	October 24, 1896	Syracuse, NY	Colgate	6–0
6	October 16, 1897	Hamilton, NY	Tie	6–6
7	October 11, 1902	Syracuse, NY	Syracuse	23–0
8	October 17, 1903	Syracuse, NY	Colgate	10–5
9	October 8, 1904	Syracuse, NY	Colgate	11–0
10	October 21, 1905	Syracuse, NY	Syracuse	11–5
11	October 20, 1906	Syracuse, NY	Colgate	5–0
12	November 7, 1908	Syracuse, NY	Colgate	6–0
13	November 13, 1909	Syracuse, NY	Colgate	6–5
14	November 12, 1910	Syracuse, NY	Colgate	11–6
15	November 16, 1912	Syracuse, NY	Colgate	7–0
16	November 15, 1913	Syracuse, NY	Colgate	35–13
17	November 14, 1914	Syracuse, NY	Tie	0–0
18	November 13, 1915	Syracuse, NY	Syracuse	38–0
19	November 18, 1916	Syracuse, NY	Colgate	15–0
20	November 17, 1917	Syracuse, NY	Syracuse	27–7
21	November 15, 1919	Syracuse, NY	Syracuse	13–7
22	November 20, 1920	Syracuse, NY	Syracuse	14–0
23	November 12, 1921	Syracuse, NY	Syracuse	14–0
24	November 18, 1922	Syracuse, NY	Syracuse	14–7
25	November 17, 1923	Syracuse, NY	Colgate	16–7
26	November 22, 1924	Syracuse, NY	Syracuse	7–3
27	November 14, 1925	Syracuse, NY	Colgate	19–6
28	November 13, 1926	Syracuse, NY	Tie	10–10
29	November 12, 1927	Syracuse, NY	Tie	13–13
30	November 17, 1928	Syracuse, NY	Colgate	30–6
31	November 16, 1929	Syracuse, NY	Colgate	21–0
32	November 15, 1930	Syracuse, NY	Colgate	36–7
33	November 14, 1931	Syracuse, NY	Colgate	21–7
34	November 12, 1932	Syracuse, NY	Colgate	16–0
35	November 18, 1933	Syracuse, NY	Colgate	13–3

No.	Date	Location	Winner	Score
36	November 17, 1934	Syracuse, NY	Colgate	13–2
37	November 16, 1935	Syracuse, NY	Colgate	27–0
38	November 21, 1936	Syracuse, NY	Colgate	13–0
39	November 20, 1937	Syracuse, NY	Colgate	7–0
40	November 5, 1938	Syracuse, NY	Syracuse	7–0
41	November 18, 1939	Syracuse, NY	Syracuse	7–0
42	November 16, 1940	Syracuse, NY	Colgate	7–6
43	November 15, 1941	Syracuse, NY	Tie	19–19
44	November 14, 1942	Syracuse, NY	Colgate	14–0
45	November 18, 1944	Syracuse, NY	Syracuse	43–13
46	November 17, 1945	Syracuse, NY	Colgate	7–6
47	November 16, 1946	Syracuse, NY	Colgate	25–7
48	November 15, 1947	Syracuse, NY	Syracuse	7–0
49	November 13, 1948	Syracuse, NY	Colgate	20–13
50	November 19, 1949	Syracuse, NY	Syracuse	35–7
51	November 18, 1950	Syracuse, NY	Colgate	19–14
52	November 17, 1951	Syracuse, NY	Syracuse	9–0
53	November 15, 1952	Syracuse, NY	No. 13 Syracuse	20–14
54	November 14, 1953	Syracuse, NY	Syracuse	34–18
55	November 13, 1954	Syracuse, NY	Syracuse	31–12
56	November 12, 1955	Syracuse, NY	Syracuse	26–19
57	November 17, 1956	Syracuse, NY	No. 9 Syracuse	61–7
58	November 16, 1957	Syracuse, NY	Syracuse	34–6
59	November 15, 1958	Syracuse, NY	No. 12 Syracuse	47–0
60	November 14, 1959	Syracuse, NY	No. 1 Syracuse	71–0
61	November 12, 1960	Syracuse, NY	No. 17 Syracuse	46–6
62	November 11, 1961	Syracuse, NY	Syracuse	51–8
63	October 31, 1981	Syracuse, NY	Syracuse	47–24
64	October 30, 1982	Syracuse, NY	Syracuse	49–15
65	October 24, 1987	Syracuse, NY	No. 9 Syracuse	52–6
66	September 25, 2010	Syracuse, NY	Syracuse	42–7
67	September 3, 2016	Syracuse, NY	Syracuse	33–7
68	September 2, 2023	Syracuse, NY	Syracuse	65–0
69	September 12, 2025	Syracuse, NY	Syracuse	66–24
Series: Syracuse leads 33–31–5

== See also ==
- List of NCAA college football rivalry games
