= 1932 Harvard Crimson football team =

American college football season

1932 Harvard Crimson football
- Conference: Independent
- Record: 5–3
- Head coach: Eddie Casey (2nd season)
- Captain: Carl H. Hageman Jr.
- Home stadium: Harvard Stadium

1932 Eastern college football independents records
	Conf.			Overall
Team	W	L	T	W		L		T
No. 5 Colgate		–		9	–	0	–	0
Brown		–		7	–	1	–	0
Columbia		–		7	–	1	–	1
Pittsburgh		–		8	–	1	–	2
No. 8 Army		–		8	–	2	–	0
Drexel		–		5	–	1	–	1
Massachusetts State		–		7	–	2	–	0
Villanova		–		7	–	2	–	0
Duquesne		–		7	–	2	–	1
Fordham		–		6	–	2	–	0
Penn		–		6	–	2	–	0
Temple		–		5	–	1	–	2
Tufts		–		5	–	1	–	2
Cornell		–		5	–	2	–	1
Franklin & Marshall		–		4	–	2	–	1
Boston College		–		4	–	2	–	2
La Salle		–		4	–	2	–	2
Harvard		–		5	–	3	–	0
NYU		–		5	–	3	–	0
Washington & Jefferson		–		5	–	3	–	1
Manhattan		–		6	–	3	–	2
Carnegie Tech		–		4	–	3	–	2
Bucknell		–		4	–	4	–	1
Syracuse		–		4	–	4	–	1
Princeton		–		2	–	2	–	3
Yale		–		2	–	2	–	3
Boston University		–		2	–	3	–	2
Vermont		–		2	–	4	–	1
CCNY		–		2	–	5	–	0
Penn State		–		2	–	5	–	0
Rankings from Dickinson System

The 1932 Harvard Crimson football team was an American football team that represented Harvard University as an independent during the 1932 college football season. In its second season under head coach Eddie Casey, the team compiled a 5–3 record and outscored opponents by a total of 169 to 99. Carl H. Hageman, Jr. was the team captain. The team played its home games at Harvard Stadium in Boston.

== Schedule ==
Date	Time	Opponent	Site	Result	Attendance	Source
October 1		Buffalo	Harvard Stadium; Boston, MA	W 66–0	3,000	
October 8		New Hampshire	Harvard Stadium; Boston, MA	W 40–0		
October 15		Penn State	Harvard Stadium; Boston, MA	W 46–13	20,000	
October 22		Dartmouth	Harvard Stadium; Boston, MA (rivalry)	W 10–7	40,000	
October 29		Brown	Harvard Stadium; Boston, MA	L 0–14	35,000	
November 5		Army	Harvard Stadium; Boston, MA	L 0–46		
November 12	2:00 p.m.	Holy Cross	Harvard Stadium; Boston, MA	W 7–0		
November 19		at Yale	Yale Bowl; New Haven, CT (rivalry)	L 0–19		
All times are in Eastern time
