= Jack Burke (footballer) =

Australian rules footballer

Personal information
- Full name: John Augustine Burke
- Born: 29 April 1918; Williamstown, Victoria
- Died: 17 January 2004 (aged 85); Mount Waverley, Victoria
- Original team: Caulfield Amateurs
- Height: 180 cm (5 ft 11 in)
- Weight: 72 kg (159 lb)
- Position: Follower / forward

Playing career^{1}
Years	Club	Games (Goals)
1939–45	Hawthorn	74 (83)
- ^{1} Playing statistics correct to the end of 1945.

John Augustine Burke (29 April 1918 – 17 January 2004) was an Australian rules footballer who played with Hawthorn in the Victorian Football League (VFL).

== Family ==
The son of Herbert James Burke and Mary Agnes Burke, nee O'Connor, John Augustine Burke was born at Williamstown on 29 April 1918.

== Football ==
After kicking 160 goals in 1938 while playing for Caulfield, Burke was recruited by Hawthorn at the start of the 1939 VFL season. After initially struggling in 1939, Burke established himself as Hawthorn's full-forward in the latter part of the 1940 season, kicking 7 goals against St Kilda in Round 13. Burke played the majority of games in 1941 to 1944, averaging over a goal a game until a knee injury forced his retirement in 1945.
