= John Burke (footballer, born 1956) =

Irish footballer (born 1956)

John Burke (born 1956) is an Irish former footballer who played as a central defender.

== Career ==
Along with Jackie Jameson he joined Shamrock Rovers in 1975 from Cherry Orchard. They both were in the 18 man Rovers party that toured Japan in September 1975.

He played three games in the UEFA Cup Winners' Cup for Rovers.

Burke signed for Shelbourne in 1981. And in 1984 signed for Sligo Rovers and played in the last ever game at Glenmalure Park on 12 April 1987.

== Sources ==
- Paul Doolan; Robert Goggins. The Hoops. ISBN 0-7171-2121-6.
