= 1932 Cornell Big Red football team =

American college football season

1932 Cornell Big Red football
- Conference: Independent
- Record: 5–2–1
- Head coach: Gil Dobie (13th season)
- Offensive scheme: Single-wing
- Base defense: 6–3–2
- Captain: Bart Viviano
- Home stadium: Schoellkopf Field

1932 Eastern college football independents records
	Conf.			Overall
Team	W	L	T	W		L		T
No. 5 Colgate		–		9	–	0	–	0
Brown		–		7	–	1	–	0
Columbia		–		7	–	1	–	1
Pittsburgh		–		8	–	1	–	2
No. 8 Army		–		8	–	2	–	0
Drexel		–		5	–	1	–	1
Massachusetts State		–		7	–	2	–	0
Villanova		–		7	–	2	–	0
Duquesne		–		7	–	2	–	1
Fordham		–		6	–	2	–	0
Penn		–		6	–	2	–	0
Temple		–		5	–	1	–	2
Tufts		–		5	–	1	–	2
Cornell		–		5	–	2	–	1
Franklin & Marshall		–		4	–	2	–	1
Boston College		–		4	–	2	–	2
La Salle		–		4	–	2	–	2
Harvard		–		5	–	3	–	0
NYU		–		5	–	3	–	0
Washington & Jefferson		–		5	–	3	–	1
Manhattan		–		6	–	3	–	2
Carnegie Tech		–		4	–	3	–	2
Bucknell		–		4	–	4	–	1
Syracuse		–		4	–	4	–	1
Princeton		–		2	–	2	–	3
Yale		–		2	–	2	–	3
Boston University		–		2	–	3	–	2
Vermont		–		2	–	4	–	1
CCNY		–		2	–	5	–	0
Penn State		–		2	–	5	–	0
Rankings from Dickinson System

The 1932 Cornell Big Red football team was an American football team that represented Cornell University during the 1932 college football season. In their 13th season under head coach Gil Dobie, the Big Red compiled a 5–2–1 record and outscored their opponents by a combined total of 174 to 39.

== Schedule ==
Date	Opponent	Site	Result	Attendance	Source
September 24	Buffalo	Schoellkopf Field; Ithaca, NY	W 72–0		
October 1	Niagara	Schoellkopf Field; Ithaca, NY	W 7–0		
October 8	Richmond	Schoellkopf Field; Ithaca, NY	W 27–0		
October 15	at Princeton	Palmer Stadium; Princeton, NJ	T 0–0		
October 29	at Columbia	Baker Field; New York, NY (rivalry)	L 0–6	35,000	
November 5	Albright	Schoellkopf Field; Ithaca, NY	W 40–14		
November 12	Dartmouth	Schoellkopf Field; Ithaca, NY (rivalry)	W 21–6		
November 24	at Penn	Franklin Field; Philadelphia, PA (rivalry)	L 7–13		
