= Bob Soleau =

American football player (1941–2014)

No. 34, 53, 65
- Position: Linebacker

Personal information
- Born: April 2, 1941; Amherst, Massachusetts, U.S.
- Died: June 21, 2014 (aged 73); Middletown, Connecticut, U.S.
- Listed height: 6 ft 2 in (1.88 m)
- Listed weight: 230 lb (104 kg)

Career information
- High school: North Hills (PA)
- College: William & Mary (1959-1963)
- NFL draft: 1964: 11th round, 150th overall pick

Career history

Playing
- Pittsburgh Steelers (1964); Hartford Charter Oaks (1966-1967); Hartford Knights (1968)

Coaching
- Hartford Knights (1969) Assistant coach

Awards and highlights
- 2× All-American (1962-1963); 2× SoCon Player of the Year (1962–1963)

Career NFL statistics
- Fumble recoveries: 1
- Stats at Pro Football Reference

Robert Heyde Soleau Jr. (April 2, 1941 – June 21, 2014) was an American professional football player who was a linebacker for the Pittsburgh Steelers of the National Football League (NFL) in 1964. Soleau played college football for the William & Mary Tribe and is the son of Charles R. Soleau, an All-American quarterback at Colgate in 1932. Later in life he was a successful businessman in the insurance industry and owned Diversified Group Brokerage in Marlborough, Connecticut.
