= John H. Burke (coach) =

American college football and basketball coach

Biographical details
- Education: Colby College

Coaching career (HC unless noted)

Football
- 1925–1930: Vermont Academy
- 1931: Vermont (freshman)
- 1932–1933: Vermont

Basketball
- 1925–1931: Vermont Academy
- 1931–1934: Vermont

Administrative career (AD unless noted)
- 1940–1942: Carteret Prep School
- 1942–?: Morristown School

Head coaching record
- Overall: 5–9–1 (college football); 16–27 (college basketball)

John Homer Burke was an American coach who was the head football and basketball at the University of Vermont.

== Biography ==
Burke graduated from West Orange High School and Colby College, took physical training courses at Columbia University, and attended Knute Rockne's coaching school at Bucknell University. In 1925, Burke became the football coach at the Vermont Academy. After and undefeated 1930 season, he was named freshman football and varsity basketball coach at the University of Vermont. In 1932, he took over as varsity coach following the departure following the departure of David L. Dunn. After two poor football seasons, Burke submitted his resignation effective the end of the basketball season. He returned to New Jersey, where he served as athletic director of Carteret Prep School and the Morristown School. His son, John H. Burke Jr., was a standout athlete at Morristown.

== Head coaching record ==
=== College football ===
Year	Team	Overall	Conference	Standing	Bowl/playoffs
Vermont Catamounts (Independent) (1932–1933)
1932	Vermont	2–4–1			
1933	Vermont	3–5			
Vermont:		5–9–1			
Total:		5–9–1			
