= 1932 Marshall Thundering Herd football team =

American college football season

1932 Marshall Thundering Herd football
- Conference: West Virginia Athletic Conference
- Record: 6–2–1 (3–0 WVAC)
- Head coach: Tom Dandelet (2nd season)
- Captain: Sammy McEwen
- Home stadium: Fairfield Stadium

1932 West Virginia Athletic Conference football standings
	Conf.					Overall
Team	W		L		T	W		L		T
Fairmont State $	4	–	1	–	0	5	–	2	–	1
Glenville State	3	–	1	–	1	4	–	2	–	1
West Liberty State	3	–	1	–	0	7	–	2	–	0
West Virginia Wesleyan	2	–	1	–	1	4	–	4	–	1
Concord	1	–	3	–	1	4	–	4	–	1
Salem	1	–	5	–	0	2	–	5	–	0
Morris Harvey	0	–	4	–	0	0	–	9	–	0
Marshall *	3	–	0	–	0	6	–	2	–	1
Davis & Elkins *	2	–	0	–	0	6	–	5	–	0
Potomac State *	2	–	0	–	1	4	–	1	–	1
New River State *	1	–	1	–	0	3	–	3	–	1
Morehead State *	0	–	1	–	0	4	–	2	–	1
Shepherd *	0	–	2	–	0	4	–	3	–	0
Bethany (WV) *	0	–	2	–	0	0	–	5	–	2
$ – Conference champion; * – Did not qualify for conference standings Ties did not count in conference standings.

The 1932 Marshall Thundering Herd football team was an American football team that represented Marshall College (now Marshall University) in the West Virginia Athletic Conference during the 1932 college football season. In its second season under head coach Tom Dandelet, the team compiled a 6–2–1 record, 3–0 against conference opponents, and outscored opponents by a total of 155 to 58. Sammy McEwen was the team captain.

== Schedule ==
Date	Opponent	Site	Result	Attendance	Source
September 24	Louisville*	Fairfield Stadium; Huntington, WV	W 60–0	9,000	
September 30	Morris Harvey	Fairfield Stadium; Huntington, WV	W 13–0		
October 8	Western Maryland*	Fairfield Stadium; Huntington, WV	T 13–13		
October 14	at Georgetown (KY)*	Georgetown, KY	W 7–0		
October 21	at Dayton*	University of Dayton Stadium; Dayton, OH	L 7–13		
October 28	Geneva*	Fairfield Stadium; Huntington, WV	L 0–12		
November 5	vs. Emory and Henry*	Wade Stadium; Bluefield, WV	W 14–6	3,000	
November 11	Salem	Fairfield Stadium; Huntington, WV	W 19–14		
November 24	West Virginia Wesleyan^{†}	Fairfield Stadium; Huntington, WV	W 22–0		
*Non-conference game; ^{†}Homecoming
