= 1932 Rutgers Queensmen football team =

American college football season

1932 Rutgers Queensmen football

Middle Three champion
- Conference: Middle Three Conference
- Record: 6–3–1 (2–0 Middle Three)
- Head coach: J. Wilder Tasker (2nd season)
- Captain: Jack Grossman
- Home stadium: Neilson Field

1932 Middle Three Conference football standings
	Conf.					Overall
Team	W		L		T	W		L		T
Rutgers $	2	–	0	–	0	6	–	3	–	1
Lafayette	1	–	1	–	0	3	–	5	–	0
Lehigh	0	–	2	–	0	2	–	6	–	1
$ – Conference champion

The 1932 Rutgers Queensmen football team represented Rutgers University in the 1932 college football season. In their second season under head coach J. Wilder Tasker, the Queensmen compiled a 6–3–1 record, won the Middle Three Conference championship, and outscored their opponents 159 to 58.

== Schedule ==
Date	Opponent	Site	Result	Attendance	Source
September 24	Providence	Neilson Field; New Brunswick, NJ	T 6–6	6,500	
October 1	Pennsylvania Military	Neilson Field; New Brunswick, NJ	W 20–6	6,000	
October 8	at NYU	Yankee Stadium; Bronx, NY	L 0–21	12,000	
October 15	Delaware	Neilson Field; New Brunswick, NJ	W 32–0		
October 22	Holy Cross	Neilson Field; New Brunswick, NJ	L 0–6		
October 29	Johns Hopkins	Neilson Field; New Brunswick, NJ	W 33–0		
November 5	Lafayette	Neilson Field; New Brunswick, NJ	W 7–6		
November 12	at Lehigh	Taylor Stadium; Bethlehem, PA	W 37–6		
November 19	at Springfield	Benedum Field; Springfield, MA	W 18–0		
December 3	at Manhattan	Ebbets Field; Brooklyn, NY	L 6–7	15,000	
