= John H. Burke Jr. =

American basketball coach (1924–2003)

Biographical details
- Born: July 4, 1924; West Orange, New Jersey, U.S.
- Died: January 27, 2003 (aged 78); Natick, Massachusetts, U.S.

Coaching career (HC unless noted)
- 1951–1955: Wesleyan (freshmen)
- 1955–1956: Grosse Point Country Day School
- 1956–1959: MIT
- 1959–1966: Boston University

Head coaching record
- Overall: 68–84

John Homer Burke Jr. (July 4, 1924 – January 27, 2003) was an American athlete and coach who was the head men's basketball coach at the Massachusetts Institute of Technology (MIT) and Boston University (BU).

== Early life ==
Burke was born in West Orange, New Jersey. His father, John H. Burke Sr. was the football and basketball coach at the University of Vermont and athletic director at the Morristown School. Burke Jr. was an all-state athlete in football, baseball, and basketball at Morristown. In 1943, he gained attention from the New York Yankees after throwing two consecutive no-hitters.

After graduating, Burke entered the United States Army. He was a private first class in the 393rd Infantry Regiment and fought in the Battle of Remagen. He was honorably discharged in 1946 and enrolled in Springfield College, where played football, baseball, and golf. That same year, he married his high school sweetheart, Lee Wilkie.

== Coaching ==
After graduating, Burke coached freshman sports at Wesleyan University for four years. He then spent one year as athletic director, teacher, and basketball coach at the Grosse Point Country Day School in Grosse Point, Michigan. From 1956 to 1959, he was the head men's basketball coach at the Massachusetts Institute of Technology. In 1959, he took the same position at Boston University. Over seven seasons, he compiled a 68–84 record. He resigned in 1966 to become the golf professional at the Needham Golf Club. A Class A member of the Professional Golfers' Association of America, Burke had been a part-time professional at Prouts Neck Country Club in Prouts Neck, Maine during his coaching career.

== Later life ==
In 1972, Burke and his wife divorced and he moved to Sudbury, Massachusetts. In 1980, he moved to Wayland, Massachusetts. He died on January 27, 2003 at a nursing home in Natick, Massachusetts.
