= 1932 Lafayette Leopards football team =

American football club

1932 Lafayette Leopards football
- Conference: Middle Three Conference
- Record: 3–5 (1–1 Middle Three)
- Head coach: Herb McCracken (9th season)
- Captain: Adam Cirillo
- Home stadium: Fisher Field

1932 Middle Three Conference football standings
	Conf.					Overall
Team	W		L		T	W		L		T
Rutgers $	2	–	0	–	0	6	–	3	–	1
Lafayette	1	–	1	–	0	3	–	5	–	0
Lehigh	0	–	2	–	0	2	–	6	–	1
$ – Conference champion

The 1932 Lafayette Leopards football team was an American football team that represented Lafayette College in the Middle Three Conference during the 1932 college football season. In its ninth season under head coach Herb McCracken, the team compiled a 3–5 record. Adam Cirillo was the team captain.

== Schedule ==
Date	Opponent	Site	Result	Source
October 1	Muhlenberg*	Fisher Field; Easton, PA	W 6–0	
October 8	at Dartmouth*	Memorial Field; Hanover, NH	L 0–6	
October 15	at Colgate*	Whitnall Field; Hamilton, NY	L 0–35	
October 22	at Bucknell*	Memorial Stadium; Lewisburg, PA	L 6–14	
October 29	Washington & Jefferson*	Fisher Field; Easton, PA	L 0–7	
November 5	at Rutgers	Neilson Field; New Brunswick, NJ	L 6–7	
November 12	St. John's (MD)*	Fisher Field; Easton, PA	W 51–0	
November 19	Lehigh	Fisher Field; Easton, PA (rivalry)	W 25–6	
*Non-conference game
