= 1932 Syracuse Orangemen football team =

American college football season

1932 Syracuse Orangemen football
- Conference: Independent
- Record: 4–4–1
- Head coach: Vic Hanson (3rd season)
- Captain: Thomas Lombardi
- Home stadium: Archbold Stadium

1932 Eastern college football independents records
	Conf.			Overall
Team	W	L	T	W		L		T
No. 5 Colgate		–		9	–	0	–	0
Brown		–		7	–	1	–	0
Columbia		–		7	–	1	–	1
Pittsburgh		–		8	–	1	–	2
No. 8 Army		–		8	–	2	–	0
Drexel		–		5	–	1	–	1
Massachusetts State		–		7	–	2	–	0
Villanova		–		7	–	2	–	0
Duquesne		–		7	–	2	–	1
Fordham		–		6	–	2	–	0
Penn		–		6	–	2	–	0
Temple		–		5	–	1	–	2
Tufts		–		5	–	1	–	2
Cornell		–		5	–	2	–	1
Franklin & Marshall		–		4	–	2	–	1
Boston College		–		4	–	2	–	2
La Salle		–		4	–	2	–	2
Harvard		–		5	–	3	–	0
NYU		–		5	–	3	–	0
Washington & Jefferson		–		5	–	3	–	1
Manhattan		–		6	–	3	–	2
Carnegie Tech		–		4	–	3	–	2
Bucknell		–		4	–	4	–	1
Syracuse		–		4	–	4	–	1
Princeton		–		2	–	2	–	3
Yale		–		2	–	2	–	3
Boston University		–		2	–	3	–	2
Vermont		–		2	–	4	–	1
CCNY		–		2	–	5	–	0
Penn State		–		2	–	5	–	0
Rankings from Dickinson System

The 1932 Syracuse Orangemen football team represented Syracuse University as an independent during the 1932 college football season. The Orangemen were led by third-year head coach Vic Hanson and played their home games at Archbold Stadium in Syracuse, New York.

== Schedule ==
Date	Opponent	Site	Result	Attendance	Source
September 24	Clarkson	Archbold Stadium; Syracuse, NY	W 13–6	5,000	
October 1	St. Lawrence	Archbold Stadium; Syracuse, NY	W 54–0	5,000	
October 8	Ohio Wesleyan	Archbold Stadium; Syracuse, NY	L 12–19	15,000	
October 15	SMU	Archbold Stadium; Syracuse, NY	L 6–16	15,000	
October 22	at Penn State	New Beaver Field; University Park, PA (rivalry)	W 12–6	6,000	
October 29	Michigan State	Archbold Stadium; Syracuse, NY	L 13–27		
November 5	Oglethorpe	Archbold Stadium; Syracuse, NY	W 27–6	15,000	
November 12	Colgate	Archbold Stadium; Syracuse, NY (rivalry)	L 0–16	25,000	
November 19	at Columbia	Baker Field; New York, NY	T 0–0	3,000	
