= 1932 Brown Bears football team =

American college football season

1932 Brown Bears football
- Conference: Independent
- Record: 7–1
- Head coach: Tuss McLaughry (7th season)
- Captain: Tom Gilbane
- Home stadium: Brown Stadium

1932 Eastern college football independents records
	Conf.			Overall
Team	W	L	T	W		L		T
No. 5 Colgate		–		9	–	0	–	0
Brown		–		7	–	1	–	0
Columbia		–		7	–	1	–	1
Pittsburgh		–		8	–	1	–	2
No. 8 Army		–		8	–	2	–	0
Drexel		–		5	–	1	–	1
Massachusetts State		–		7	–	2	–	0
Villanova		–		7	–	2	–	0
Duquesne		–		7	–	2	–	1
Fordham		–		6	–	2	–	0
Penn		–		6	–	2	–	0
Temple		–		5	–	1	–	2
Tufts		–		5	–	1	–	2
Cornell		–		5	–	2	–	1
Franklin & Marshall		–		4	–	2	–	1
Boston College		–		4	–	2	–	2
La Salle		–		4	–	2	–	2
Harvard		–		5	–	3	–	0
NYU		–		5	–	3	–	0
Washington & Jefferson		–		5	–	3	–	1
Manhattan		–		6	–	3	–	2
Carnegie Tech		–		4	–	3	–	2
Bucknell		–		4	–	4	–	1
Syracuse		–		4	–	4	–	1
Princeton		–		2	–	2	–	3
Yale		–		2	–	2	–	3
Boston University		–		2	–	3	–	2
Vermont		–		2	–	4	–	1
CCNY		–		2	–	5	–	0
Penn State		–		2	–	5	–	0
Rankings from Dickinson System

The 1932 Brown Bears football team was an American football team that represented Brown University as an independent during the 1932 college football season. In their seventh year under head coach Tuss McLaughry, the Bears compiled a 7–1 and outscored opponents by a total of 81 to 42. They won the first seven games of the season, including victories over Yale, Harvard, and Columbia. In the final game of the season, the Bears lost to undefeated Colgate, which was recognized by Parke H. Davis as a 1932 co-national champion.

No Brown player was a consensus pick for the 1932 All-America college football team, though center and team captain Tom Gilbane received first-team honors from the Central Press, Quarterback Bob Chase received first-team honors from the Central Press on the 1932 All-Eastern football team and was rated among the best quarterbacks to play for Brown.

The team played its home games at Brown Stadium in Providence, Rhode Island

== Schedule ==
Date	Opponent	Site	Result	Attendance	Source
October 1	Rhode Island State	Brown Stadium; Providence, RI	W 19–0		
October 8	Springfield	Brown Stadium; Providence, RI	W 13–6		
October 15	at Yale	Yale Bowl; New Haven, CT	W 7–2		
October 22	Tufts	Brown Stadium; Providence, RI	W 11–0		
October 29	at Harvard	Harvard Stadium; Boston, MA	W 14–0	35,000	
November 5	Holy Cross	Brown Stadium; Providence, RI	W 10–7	20,000	
November 12	at Columbia	Baker Field; New York, NY	W 7–6		
November 24	Colgate	Brown Stadium; Providence, RI	L 0–21		
