= 1932 Vermont Catamounts football team =

American college football season

1932 Vermont Catamounts football
- Conference: Independent
- Record: 2–4–1
- Head coach: John H. Burke (1st season)
- Home stadium: Centennial Field

1932 Eastern college football independents records
	Conf.			Overall
Team	W	L	T	W		L		T
No. 5 Colgate		–		9	–	0	–	0
Brown		–		7	–	1	–	0
Columbia		–		7	–	1	–	1
Pittsburgh		–		8	–	1	–	2
No. 8 Army		–		8	–	2	–	0
Drexel		–		5	–	1	–	1
Massachusetts State		–		7	–	2	–	0
Villanova		–		7	–	2	–	0
Duquesne		–		7	–	2	–	1
Fordham		–		6	–	2	–	0
Penn		–		6	–	2	–	0
Temple		–		5	–	1	–	2
Tufts		–		5	–	1	–	2
Cornell		–		5	–	2	–	1
Franklin & Marshall		–		4	–	2	–	1
Boston College		–		4	–	2	–	2
La Salle		–		4	–	2	–	2
Harvard		–		5	–	3	–	0
NYU		–		5	–	3	–	0
Washington & Jefferson		–		5	–	3	–	1
Manhattan		–		6	–	3	–	2
Carnegie Tech		–		4	–	3	–	2
Bucknell		–		4	–	4	–	1
Syracuse		–		4	–	4	–	1
Princeton		–		2	–	2	–	3
Yale		–		2	–	2	–	3
Boston University		–		2	–	3	–	2
Vermont		–		2	–	4	–	1
CCNY		–		2	–	5	–	0
Penn State		–		2	–	5	–	0
Rankings from Dickinson System

The 1932 Vermont Catamounts football team was an American football team that represented the University of Vermont as an independent during the 1932 college football season. In their first year under head coach John H. Burke, the team compiled a 2–4–1 record.

== Schedule ==
Date	Opponent	Site	Result	Source
September 24	Saint Michael's	Centennial Field; Burlington, VT	W 7–0	
October 1	at Dartmouth	Memorial Field; Hanover, NH	L 0–32	
October 8	Providence	Centennial Field; Burlington, VT	L 0–13	
October 15	at Colby	Seaverns Field; Waterville, ME	No contest	
October 22	at New Hampshire	Lewis Field; Durham, NH	L 6–22	
October 29	Norwich	Centennial Field; Burlington, VT	W 19–0	
November 5	Boston University	Centennial Field; Burlington, VT	T 0–0	
November 12	at Middlebury	Porter Field; Middlebury, VT	L 0–7	
