= 1932 Penn Quakers football team =

American college football season

1932 Penn Quakers football
- Conference: Independent
- Record: 6–2
- Head coach: Harvey Harman (2nd season)
- Captain: Stanley Sokolis
- Home stadium: Franklin Field

1932 Eastern college football independents records
| | Conf. | | | Overall |
| Team | W | L | T | W | | L | | T |
|---|---|---|---|---|---|---|---|---|
| No. 5 Colgate | | – | | 9 | – | 0 | – | 0 |
| Brown | | – | | 7 | – | 1 | – | 0 |
| Columbia | | – | | 7 | – | 1 | – | 1 |
| Pittsburgh | | – | | 8 | – | 1 | – | 2 |
| No. 8 Army | | – | | 8 | – | 2 | – | 0 |
| Drexel | | – | | 5 | – | 1 | – | 1 |
| Massachusetts State | | – | | 7 | – | 2 | – | 0 |
| Villanova | | – | | 7 | – | 2 | – | 0 |
| Duquesne | | – | | 7 | – | 2 | – | 1 |
| Fordham | | – | | 6 | – | 2 | – | 0 |
| Penn | | – | | 6 | – | 2 | – | 0 |
| Temple | | – | | 5 | – | 1 | – | 2 |
| Tufts | | – | | 5 | – | 1 | – | 2 |
| Cornell | | – | | 5 | – | 2 | – | 1 |
| Franklin & Marshall | | – | | 4 | – | 2 | – | 1 |
| Boston College | | – | | 4 | – | 2 | – | 2 |
| La Salle | | – | | 4 | – | 2 | – | 2 |
| Harvard | | – | | 5 | – | 3 | – | 0 |
| NYU | | – | | 5 | – | 3 | – | 0 |
| Washington & Jefferson | | – | | 5 | – | 3 | – | 1 |
| Manhattan | | – | | 6 | – | 3 | – | 2 |
| Carnegie Tech | | – | | 4 | – | 3 | – | 2 |
| Bucknell | | – | | 4 | – | 4 | – | 1 |
| Syracuse | | – | | 4 | – | 4 | – | 1 |
| Princeton | | – | | 2 | – | 2 | – | 3 |
| Yale | | – | | 2 | – | 2 | – | 3 |
| Boston University | | – | | 2 | – | 3 | – | 2 |
| Vermont | | – | | 2 | – | 4 | – | 1 |
| CCNY | | – | | 2 | – | 5 | – | 0 |
| Penn State | | – | | 2 | – | 5 | – | 0 |
Rankings from Dickinson System

The 1932 Penn Quakers football team was an American football team that represented the University of Pennsylvania as an independent during the 1932 college football season. In its second season under head coach Harvey Harman, the team compiled a 6–2 record and outscored opponents by a total of 178 to 58. The team played its home games at Franklin Field in Philadelphia.

Stanley Sokolis was the team captain, George Munger played at the halfback position, and Wallace D. Hall was quarterback.

== Schedule ==
| Date | Opponent | Site | Result | Attendance | Source |
|---|---|---|---|---|---|
| October 1 | Franklin & Marshall | Franklin Field; Philadelphia, PA | W 38–0 | 15,000 | |
| October 8 | Swarthmore | Franklin Field; Philadelphia, PA | W 54–0 | 20,000 | |
| October 15 | Dartmouth | Franklin Field; Philadelphia, PA | W 14–7 | 40,000 | |
| October 22 | Lehigh | Franklin Field; Philadelphia, PA | W 33–6 | 18,000 | |
| October 29 | Navy | Franklin Field; Philadelphia, PA | W 14–0 | 50,000 | |
| November 5 | Pittsburgh | Franklin Field; Philadelphia, PA | L 12–19 | 70,000 | |
| November 12 | at Ohio State | Ohio Stadium; Columbus, OH | L 0–19 | 19,301 | |
| November 24 | Cornell | Franklin Field; Philadelphia, PA (rivalry) | W 13–7 | 50,000 | |
