= 1932 Yale Bulldogs football team =

American college football season

1932 Yale Bulldogs football
- Conference: Independent
- Record: 2–2–3
- Head coach: Mal Stevens (5th season)
- Captain: John S. Wilbur
- Home stadium: Yale Bowl

1932 Eastern college football independents records
	Conf.			Overall
Team	W	L	T	W		L		T
No. 5 Colgate		–		9	–	0	–	0
Brown		–		7	–	1	–	0
Columbia		–		7	–	1	–	1
Pittsburgh		–		8	–	1	–	2
No. 8 Army		–		8	–	2	–	0
Drexel		–		5	–	1	–	1
Massachusetts State		–		7	–	2	–	0
Villanova		–		7	–	2	–	0
Duquesne		–		7	–	2	–	1
Fordham		–		6	–	2	–	0
Penn		–		6	–	2	–	0
Temple		–		5	–	1	–	2
Tufts		–		5	–	1	–	2
Cornell		–		5	–	2	–	1
Franklin & Marshall		–		4	–	2	–	1
Boston College		–		4	–	2	–	2
La Salle		–		4	–	2	–	2
Harvard		–		5	–	3	–	0
NYU		–		5	–	3	–	0
Washington & Jefferson		–		5	–	3	–	1
Manhattan		–		6	–	3	–	2
Carnegie Tech		–		4	–	3	–	2
Bucknell		–		4	–	4	–	1
Syracuse		–		4	–	4	–	1
Princeton		–		2	–	2	–	3
Yale		–		2	–	2	–	3
Boston University		–		2	–	3	–	2
Vermont		–		2	–	4	–	1
CCNY		–		2	–	5	–	0
Penn State		–		2	–	5	–	0
Rankings from Dickinson System

The 1932 Yale Bulldogs football team was an American football team that represented Yale University as an independent during the 1932 college football season. In its fifth year under head coach Mal Stevens, the team compiled a 2–2–3 record, scored 41 points, and allowed opponents also to score 41 points. The team played its home games at the Yale Bowl in New Haven, Connecticut.

Halfback Robert Lassiter was selected by Parke Davis on his 1932 All-America team. Tackle John Wilbur was selected by the New York Sun as a second-team All-American.

== Schedule ==
Date	Opponent	Site	Result	Attendance	Source
October 1	Bates	Yale Bowl; New Haven, CT	T 0–0		
October 8	Chicago	Yale Bowl; New Haven, CT	T 7–7	25,000	
October 15	Brown	Yale Bowl; New Haven, CT	L 2–7	15,000	
October 22	Army	Yale Bowl; New Haven, CT	L 0–20		
October 29	Dartmouth	Yale Bowl; New Haven, CT	W 6–0	27,000	
November 12	at Princeton	Palmer Stadium; Princeton, NJ (rivalry)	T 7–7	55,000	
November 19	Harvard	Yale Bowl; New Haven, CT (rivalry)	W 19–0		
