= 1932 CCNY Lavender football team =

American college football season

1932 CCNY Lavender football
- Conference: Independent
- Record: 2–5
- Head coach: Harold J. Parker (9th season)
- Home stadium: Lewisohn Stadium

1932 Eastern college football independents records
	Conf.			Overall
Team	W	L	T	W		L		T
No. 5 Colgate		–		9	–	0	–	0
Brown		–		7	–	1	–	0
Columbia		–		7	–	1	–	1
Pittsburgh		–		8	–	1	–	2
No. 8 Army		–		8	–	2	–	0
Drexel		–		5	–	1	–	1
Massachusetts State		–		7	–	2	–	0
Villanova		–		7	–	2	–	0
Duquesne		–		7	–	2	–	1
Fordham		–		6	–	2	–	0
Penn		–		6	–	2	–	0
Temple		–		5	–	1	–	2
Tufts		–		5	–	1	–	2
Cornell		–		5	–	2	–	1
Franklin & Marshall		–		4	–	2	–	1
Boston College		–		4	–	2	–	2
La Salle		–		4	–	2	–	2
Harvard		–		5	–	3	–	0
NYU		–		5	–	3	–	0
Washington & Jefferson		–		5	–	3	–	1
Manhattan		–		6	–	3	–	2
Carnegie Tech		–		4	–	3	–	2
Bucknell		–		4	–	4	–	1
Syracuse		–		4	–	4	–	1
Princeton		–		2	–	2	–	3
Yale		–		2	–	2	–	3
Boston University		–		2	–	3	–	2
Vermont		–		2	–	4	–	1
CCNY		–		2	–	5	–	0
Penn State		–		2	–	5	–	0
Rankings from Dickinson System

The 1932 CCNY Lavender football team was an American football team that represented the City College of New York (CCNY) as an independent during the 1932 college football season. In their ninth season under Harold J. Parker, the Lavender team compiled a 2–5 record.

== Schedule ==
Date	Opponent	Site	Result	Attendance	Source
October 1	Catholic University	Lewisohn Stadium; New York, NY	L 0–47		
October 8	at Lowell Textile	Lowell, MA	L 0–7		
October 15	RPI	Lewisohn Stadium; New York, NY	W 13–0		
October 22	Drexel	Lewisohn Stadium; New York, NY	L 0–20		
October 29	Brooklyn	Lewisohn Stadium; New York, NY	W 18–7		
November 5	at Providence	Providence, RI	L 0–46		
November 8	vs. Manhattan	Polo Grounds; New York, NY	L 6–13	7,000	
