= 1932 Boston University Pioneers football team =

American college football season

1932 Boston University Pioneers football
- Conference: Independent
- Record: 2–3–2
- Head coach: Myles Lane (1st season)
- Home stadium: Nickerson Field

1932 Eastern college football independents records
	Conf.			Overall
Team	W	L	T	W		L		T
No. 5 Colgate		–		9	–	0	–	0
Brown		–		7	–	1	–	0
Columbia		–		7	–	1	–	1
Pittsburgh		–		8	–	1	–	2
No. 8 Army		–		8	–	2	–	0
Drexel		–		5	–	1	–	1
Massachusetts State		–		7	–	2	–	0
Villanova		–		7	–	2	–	0
Duquesne		–		7	–	2	–	1
Fordham		–		6	–	2	–	0
Penn		–		6	–	2	–	0
Temple		–		5	–	1	–	2
Tufts		–		5	–	1	–	2
Cornell		–		5	–	2	–	1
Franklin & Marshall		–		4	–	2	–	1
Boston College		–		4	–	2	–	2
La Salle		–		4	–	2	–	2
Harvard		–		5	–	3	–	0
NYU		–		5	–	3	–	0
Washington & Jefferson		–		5	–	3	–	1
Manhattan		–		6	–	3	–	2
Carnegie Tech		–		4	–	3	–	2
Bucknell		–		4	–	4	–	1
Syracuse		–		4	–	4	–	1
Princeton		–		2	–	2	–	3
Yale		–		2	–	2	–	3
Boston University		–		2	–	3	–	2
Vermont		–		2	–	4	–	1
CCNY		–		2	–	5	–	0
Penn State		–		2	–	5	–	0
Rankings from Dickinson System

The 1932 Boston University Pioneers football team was an American football team that represented Boston University as an independent during the 1932 college football season. In its first and only season under head coach Myles Lane, the team compiled a 2–3–2 record and was outscored by a total of 100 to 47.

== Schedule ==
Date	Opponent	Site	Result	Attendance	Source
October 1	New Hampshire	Nickerson Field; Weston, MA	W 13–6		
October 8	at Rhode Island State	Kingston, RI	W 7–0		
October 15	Providence	Nickerson Field; Weston, MA	L 6–25		
October 22	at Geneva	Beaver Falls, PA	L 6–39		
November 5	at Vermont	Centennial Field; Burlington, VT	T 0–0		
November 12	Tufts	Nickerson Field; Weston, MA	T 9–9		
November 19	at Boston College	Alumni Field; Chestnut Hill, MA (rivalry)	L 6–21		
