= 1932 La Salle Explorers football team =

American college football season

1932 La Salle Explorers football
- Conference: Independent
- Record: 4–2–2
- Head coach: Tom Conley (2nd season)
- Home stadium: Philadelphia Ball Park; Passon Field

1932 Eastern college football independents records
	Conf.			Overall
Team	W	L	T	W		L		T
No. 5 Colgate		–		9	–	0	–	0
Brown		–		7	–	1	–	0
Columbia		–		7	–	1	–	1
Pittsburgh		–		8	–	1	–	2
No. 8 Army		–		8	–	2	–	0
Drexel		–		5	–	1	–	1
Massachusetts State		–		7	–	2	–	0
Villanova		–		7	–	2	–	0
Duquesne		–		7	–	2	–	1
Fordham		–		6	–	2	–	0
Penn		–		6	–	2	–	0
Temple		–		5	–	1	–	2
Tufts		–		5	–	1	–	2
Cornell		–		5	–	2	–	1
Franklin & Marshall		–		4	–	2	–	1
Boston College		–		4	–	2	–	2
La Salle		–		4	–	2	–	2
Harvard		–		5	–	3	–	0
NYU		–		5	–	3	–	0
Washington & Jefferson		–		5	–	3	–	1
Manhattan		–		6	–	3	–	2
Carnegie Tech		–		4	–	3	–	2
Bucknell		–		4	–	4	–	1
Syracuse		–		4	–	4	–	1
Princeton		–		2	–	2	–	3
Yale		–		2	–	2	–	3
Boston University		–		2	–	3	–	2
Vermont		–		2	–	4	–	1
CCNY		–		2	–	5	–	0
Penn State		–		2	–	5	–	0
Rankings from Dickinson System

The 1932 La Salle Explorers football team was an American football team that represented La Salle College (now known as La Salle University) as an independent during the 1932 college football season. In their second year under head coach Tom Conley, the Explorers compiled a 4–2–2 record.

== Schedule ==
Date	Opponent	Site	Result	Attendance	Source
September 24	Mount St. Mary's	Philadelphia Ball Park; Philadelphia, PA	T 0–0		
October 1	at Delaware	Frazer Field; Newark, DE	L 6–11	4,000	
October 8	at Moravian	Liberty H.S. Field; Bethlehem, PA	W 24–0		
October 14	Gallaudet	Passon Field; Philadelphia, PA	W 51–0	3,000	
October 22	Brooklyn	Philadelphia Ball Park; Philadelphia, PA	W 39–0		
October 29	West Chester	Philadelphia Ball Park; Philadelphia, PA	W 20–0	2,500	
November 13	at Canisius	Buffalo, NY	T 0–0		
November 20	at St. Thomas (PA)	Crystal Garden Stadium; Dickson City, PA	L 0–24	3,000	
