= 1932 Drexel Dragons football team =

American college football season

1932 Drexel Dragons football
- Conference: Independent
- Record: 5–1–1
- Head coach: Walter Halas (6th season)
- Captain: Ed Marsh
- Home stadium: Drexel Field

1932 Eastern college football independents records
	Conf.			Overall
Team	W	L	T	W		L		T
No. 5 Colgate		–		9	–	0	–	0
Brown		–		7	–	1	–	0
Columbia		–		7	–	1	–	1
Pittsburgh		–		8	–	1	–	2
No. 8 Army		–		8	–	2	–	0
Drexel		–		5	–	1	–	1
Massachusetts State		–		7	–	2	–	0
Villanova		–		7	–	2	–	0
Duquesne		–		7	–	2	–	1
Fordham		–		6	–	2	–	0
Penn		–		6	–	2	–	0
Temple		–		5	–	1	–	2
Tufts		–		5	–	1	–	2
Cornell		–		5	–	2	–	1
Franklin & Marshall		–		4	–	2	–	1
Boston College		–		4	–	2	–	2
La Salle		–		4	–	2	–	2
Harvard		–		5	–	3	–	0
NYU		–		5	–	3	–	0
Washington & Jefferson		–		5	–	3	–	1
Manhattan		–		6	–	3	–	2
Carnegie Tech		–		4	–	3	–	2
Bucknell		–		4	–	4	–	1
Syracuse		–		4	–	4	–	1
Princeton		–		2	–	2	–	3
Yale		–		2	–	2	–	3
Boston University		–		2	–	3	–	2
Vermont		–		2	–	4	–	1
CCNY		–		2	–	5	–	0
Penn State		–		2	–	5	–	0
Rankings from Dickinson System

The 1932 Drexel Dragons football team represented Drexel Institute—now known as Drexel University—in the 1932 college football season. Led by Walter Halas in his sixth season as head coach, the team compiled a record of 5–1–1.

== Schedule ==
Date	Opponent	Site	Result	Source
September 24	at Lehigh	Bethlehem, PA	T 13–13	
October 1	West Chester	Drexel Field; Philadelphia, PA	W 18–6	
October 8	Delaware	Frazer Field; Newark, DE	W 13–10	
October 15	Juniata	Drexel Field; Philadelphia, PA	W 20–0	
October 22	at CCNY	Lewisohn Stadium; New York, NY	W 20–0	
October 29	at Washington College	Chestertown, MD	W 28–13	
November 5	at Ursinus	Collegeville, PA	L 6–28	

== Roster ==
1932 Drexel Dragons football team roster
Players
Coaches
Offense

Pos.	#	Name	Class
TE	45	William Wright
OT	7	Ed Marsh (C)
G	17	Martin
C	57	Al Eckelmeyer
G	21	Keller
OT	40	Ted Markle
TE	59	Harry Brevda
HB	52	Samuel Potter
HB	14	Henry Schoeller
FB	31	Ralph Petchik
QB	25	Myron Fleming
TE	5	Finocharo
HB	16	Robert Kennedy
C	22	Dan Dugan
TE	24	James Reynolds
G	30	Thomas Lukens
FB	33	Joseph Guggenheim
TE	37	Henry Wallace
HB	38	Charlie Knapp
OT	43	Joseph Finnerty
TE	44	Raymond Wirth
G	46	Abel
G	56	Henry Kelly
TE	58	A. Mered Hoff
OT	69	John Goheen
QB	70	Frank Burns
HB	71	John Gabriel
QB	84	Jack Van Horn
FB	85	Jim Donnelley

Defense

Pos.	#	Name	Class

Special teams

Pos.	#	Name	Class

Head coach

- Walter Halas (Illinois)

Coordinators/assistant coaches

- Albert H. Repscha (Maine)
- Rae Crowther (Colgate)

Legend

- (C) Team captain
- (S) Suspended
- (I) Ineligible
- Injured
- Redshirt
