= 1932 Massachusetts State Aggies football team =

American college football season

1932 Massachusetts State Aggies football
- Conference: Independent
- Record: 7–2
- Head coach: Mel Taube (2nd season)
- Home stadium: Alumni Field

1932 Eastern college football independents records
	Conf.			Overall
Team	W	L	T	W		L		T
No. 5 Colgate		–		9	–	0	–	0
Brown		–		7	–	1	–	0
Columbia		–		7	–	1	–	1
Pittsburgh		–		8	–	1	–	2
No. 8 Army		–		8	–	2	–	0
Drexel		–		5	–	1	–	1
Massachusetts State		–		7	–	2	–	0
Villanova		–		7	–	2	–	0
Duquesne		–		7	–	2	–	1
Fordham		–		6	–	2	–	0
Penn		–		6	–	2	–	0
Temple		–		5	–	1	–	2
Tufts		–		5	–	1	–	2
Cornell		–		5	–	2	–	1
Franklin & Marshall		–		4	–	2	–	1
Boston College		–		4	–	2	–	2
La Salle		–		4	–	2	–	2
Harvard		–		5	–	3	–	0
NYU		–		5	–	3	–	0
Washington & Jefferson		–		5	–	3	–	1
Manhattan		–		6	–	3	–	2
Carnegie Tech		–		4	–	3	–	2
Bucknell		–		4	–	4	–	1
Syracuse		–		4	–	4	–	1
Princeton		–		2	–	2	–	3
Yale		–		2	–	2	–	3
Boston University		–		2	–	3	–	2
Vermont		–		2	–	4	–	1
CCNY		–		2	–	5	–	0
Penn State		–		2	–	5	–	0
Rankings from Dickinson System

The 1932 Massachusetts State Aggies football team represented Massachusetts State College in the 1932 college football season. The team was coached by Mel Taube and played its home games at Alumni Field in Amherst, Massachusetts. Mass State finished the season with a record of 7–2.

== Schedule ==
Date	Opponent	Site	Result
September 24	Cooper Union	Alumni Field; Amherst, MA	W 50–0
October 1	at Bowdoin	Whittier Field; Brunswick, ME	L 6–20
October 8	at Middlebury	Middlebury, VT	W 13–6
October 15	at Connecticut	Gardner Dow Athletic Fields; Storrs, CT (rivalry)	W 39–0
October 22	Worcester Tech	Alumni Field; Amherst, MA	W 25–0
October 29	Amherst	Alumni Field; Amherst, MA	W 21–6
November 5	RPI	Alumni Field; Amherst, MA	W 18–13
November 12	Coast Guard	Alumni Field; Amherst, MA	W 20–13
November 19	at Tufts	Tufts Oval; Somerville, MA	L 2–6
