= 1932 Penn State Nittany Lions football team =

American college football season

1932 Penn State Nittany Lions football
- Conference: Independent
- Record: 2–5
- Head coach: Bob Higgins (3rd season)
- Captain: George Collins
- Home stadium: New Beaver Field

1932 Eastern college football independents records
	Conf.			Overall
Team	W	L	T	W		L		T
No. 5 Colgate		–		9	–	0	–	0
Brown		–		7	–	1	–	0
Columbia		–		7	–	1	–	1
Pittsburgh		–		8	–	1	–	2
No. 8 Army		–		8	–	2	–	0
Drexel		–		5	–	1	–	1
Massachusetts State		–		7	–	2	–	0
Villanova		–		7	–	2	–	0
Duquesne		–		7	–	2	–	1
Fordham		–		6	–	2	–	0
Penn		–		6	–	2	–	0
Temple		–		5	–	1	–	2
Tufts		–		5	–	1	–	2
Cornell		–		5	–	2	–	1
Franklin & Marshall		–		4	–	2	–	1
Boston College		–		4	–	2	–	2
La Salle		–		4	–	2	–	2
Harvard		–		5	–	3	–	0
NYU		–		5	–	3	–	0
Washington & Jefferson		–		5	–	3	–	1
Manhattan		–		6	–	3	–	2
Carnegie Tech		–		4	–	3	–	2
Bucknell		–		4	–	4	–	1
Syracuse		–		4	–	4	–	1
Princeton		–		2	–	2	–	3
Yale		–		2	–	2	–	3
Boston University		–		2	–	3	–	2
Vermont		–		2	–	4	–	1
CCNY		–		2	–	5	–	0
Penn State		–		2	–	5	–	0
Rankings from Dickinson System

The 1932 Penn State Nittany Lions football team represented the Pennsylvania State University as an independent during the 1932 college football season. The team was coached by Bob Higgins and played its home games in New Beaver Field in State College, Pennsylvania.

== Schedule ==
Date	Opponent	Site	Result	Attendance	Source
October 1	Lebanon Valley	New Beaver Field; State College, PA	W 27–0	2,500	
October 8	Waynesburg	New Beaver Field; State College, PA	L 6–7	4,000	
October 15	at Harvard	Harvard Stadium; Boston, MA	L 13–46	20,000	
October 22	Syracuse^{†}	New Beaver Field; State College, PA (rivalry)	L 6–12	6,000	
October 29	at Colgate	Hamilton, NY	L 0–31	4,000	
November 5	Sewanee	New Beaver Field; State College, PA	W 18–6	5,500	
November 12	at Temple	Temple Stadium; Philadelphia, PA	L 12–13	15,000	
^{†}Homecoming
