= 1932 Princeton Tigers football team =

American college football season

1932 Princeton Tigers football
- Conference: Independent
- Record: 2–2–3
- Head coach: Fritz Crisler (1st season)
- Captain: F. Tremiane "Josh" Billings Jr.
- Home stadium: Palmer Stadium

1932 Eastern college football independents records
	Conf.			Overall
Team	W	L	T	W		L		T
No. 5 Colgate		–		9	–	0	–	0
Brown		–		7	–	1	–	0
Columbia		–		7	–	1	–	1
Pittsburgh		–		8	–	1	–	2
No. 8 Army		–		8	–	2	–	0
Drexel		–		5	–	1	–	1
Massachusetts State		–		7	–	2	–	0
Villanova		–		7	–	2	–	0
Duquesne		–		7	–	2	–	1
Fordham		–		6	–	2	–	0
Penn		–		6	–	2	–	0
Temple		–		5	–	1	–	2
Tufts		–		5	–	1	–	2
Cornell		–		5	–	2	–	1
Franklin & Marshall		–		4	–	2	–	1
Boston College		–		4	–	2	–	2
La Salle		–		4	–	2	–	2
Harvard		–		5	–	3	–	0
NYU		–		5	–	3	–	0
Washington & Jefferson		–		5	–	3	–	1
Manhattan		–		6	–	3	–	2
Carnegie Tech		–		4	–	3	–	2
Bucknell		–		4	–	4	–	1
Syracuse		–		4	–	4	–	1
Princeton		–		2	–	2	–	3
Yale		–		2	–	2	–	3
Boston University		–		2	–	3	–	2
Vermont		–		2	–	4	–	1
CCNY		–		2	–	5	–	0
Penn State		–		2	–	5	–	0
Rankings from Dickinson System

The 1932 Princeton Tigers football team represented Princeton University in the 1932 college football season. The Tigers finished with a 2–2–3 record under first-year head coach Fritz Crisler. No Princeton players were selected as first-team honorees on the 1932 College Football All-America Team.

Prior to 1932, Crisler was the head football coach at Minnesota. In February 1932, he was signed to a three-year contract with Princeton at an annual salary in excess of $10,000.

== Schedule ==
Date	Opponent	Site	Result	Attendance	Source
October 1	Amherst	Palmer Stadium; Princeton, NJ	W 22–0	10,000	
October 8	at Columbia	Baker Field; New York, NY	L 7–20	34,000	
October 15	Cornell	Palmer Stadium; Princeton, NJ	T 0–0	25,000	
October 22	Navy	Palmer Stadium; Princeton, NJ	T 0–0	40,000	
October 29	at Michigan	Michigan Stadium; Ann Arbor, MI	L 7–14	26,424	
November 5	Lehigh	Palmer Stadium; Princeton, NJ	W 53–0	15,000	
November 12	Yale	Palmer Stadium; Princeton, NJ (rivalry)	T 7–7	55,000	
