= 1932 Boston College Eagles football team =

American college football season

1932 Boston College Eagles football
- Conference: Independent
- Record: 4–2–2
- Head coach: Joe McKenney (5th season)
- Captain: Philip Couhig
- Home stadium: Alumni Field

1932 Eastern college football independents records
	Conf.			Overall
Team	W	L	T	W		L		T
No. 5 Colgate		–		9	–	0	–	0
Brown		–		7	–	1	–	0
Columbia		–		7	–	1	–	1
Pittsburgh		–		8	–	1	–	2
No. 8 Army		–		8	–	2	–	0
Drexel		–		5	–	1	–	1
Massachusetts State		–		7	–	2	–	0
Villanova		–		7	–	2	–	0
Duquesne		–		7	–	2	–	1
Fordham		–		6	–	2	–	0
Penn		–		6	–	2	–	0
Temple		–		5	–	1	–	2
Tufts		–		5	–	1	–	2
Cornell		–		5	–	2	–	1
Franklin & Marshall		–		4	–	2	–	1
Boston College		–		4	–	2	–	2
La Salle		–		4	–	2	–	2
Harvard		–		5	–	3	–	0
NYU		–		5	–	3	–	0
Washington & Jefferson		–		5	–	3	–	1
Manhattan		–		6	–	3	–	2
Carnegie Tech		–		4	–	3	–	2
Bucknell		–		4	–	4	–	1
Syracuse		–		4	–	4	–	1
Princeton		–		2	–	2	–	3
Yale		–		2	–	2	–	3
Boston University		–		2	–	3	–	2
Vermont		–		2	–	4	–	1
CCNY		–		2	–	5	–	0
Penn State		–		2	–	5	–	0
Rankings from Dickinson System

The 1932 Boston College Eagles football team represented Boston College as an independent during the 1932 college football season. The Eagles were led by fifth-year head coach Joe McKenney and played their home games at Alumni Field in Chestnut Hill, Massachusetts. The team finished with a record of 4–2–2.

== Schedule ==
Date	Time	Opponent	Site	Result	Attendance	Source
October 1	2:30 p.m.	Loyola (MD)	Alumni Field; Chestnut Hill, MA	W 14–0	9,000	
October 12	2:00 p.m.	Centre	Alumni Field; Chestnut Hill, MA	W 6–0	14,000–16,000	
October 22		at Marquette	Marquette Stadium; Milwaukee, WI	L 0–13		
October 29		Fordham	Alumni Field; Chestnut Hill, MA	W 3–0		
November 5	2:00 p.m.	Villanova	Alumni Field; Chestnut Hill, MA	L 9–20		
November 11	2:00 p.m.	Western Maryland	Alumni Field; Chestnut Hill, MA	T 20–20		
November 19	2:00 p.m.	Boston University	Alumni Field; Chestnut Hill, MA (rivalry)	W 21–6		
November 26	1:45 p.m.	at Holy Cross	Fitton Field; Worcester, MA (rivalry)	T 0–0		
All times are in Eastern time
