= 1932 Duquesne Dukes football team =

American college football season

1932 Duquesne Dukes football
- Conference: Independent
- Record: 7–2–1
- Head coach: Elmer Layden (6th season)
- Home stadium: Forbes Field

1932 Eastern college football independents records
	Conf.			Overall
Team	W	L	T	W		L		T
No. 5 Colgate		–		9	–	0	–	0
Brown		–		7	–	1	–	0
Columbia		–		7	–	1	–	1
Pittsburgh		–		8	–	1	–	2
No. 8 Army		–		8	–	2	–	0
Drexel		–		5	–	1	–	1
Massachusetts State		–		7	–	2	–	0
Villanova		–		7	–	2	–	0
Duquesne		–		7	–	2	–	1
Fordham		–		6	–	2	–	0
Penn		–		6	–	2	–	0
Temple		–		5	–	1	–	2
Tufts		–		5	–	1	–	2
Cornell		–		5	–	2	–	1
Franklin & Marshall		–		4	–	2	–	1
Boston College		–		4	–	2	–	2
La Salle		–		4	–	2	–	2
Harvard		–		5	–	3	–	0
NYU		–		5	–	3	–	0
Washington & Jefferson		–		5	–	3	–	1
Manhattan		–		6	–	3	–	2
Carnegie Tech		–		4	–	3	–	2
Bucknell		–		4	–	4	–	1
Syracuse		–		4	–	4	–	1
Princeton		–		2	–	2	–	3
Yale		–		2	–	2	–	3
Boston University		–		2	–	3	–	2
Vermont		–		2	–	4	–	1
CCNY		–		2	–	5	–	0
Penn State		–		2	–	5	–	0
Rankings from Dickinson System

The 1932 Duquesne Dukes football team was an American football team that represented Duquesne University as an independent during the 1932 college football season. In its sixth season under head coach Elmer Layden, Duquesne compiled a 7–2–1 record and outscored opponents by a total of 132 to 58. The team played its home games at Forbes Field in Pittsburgh.

== Schedule ==
Date	Time	Opponent	Site	Result	Attendance	Source
September 16		Westminster (PA)	Forbes Field; Pittsburgh, PA	W 20–0		
September 23		West Virginia	Forbes Field; Pittsburgh, PA	W 3–0	30,000	
September 30		Grove City	Forbes Field; Pittsburgh, PA	W 26–0		
October 8		at Pittsburgh	Pitt Stadium; Pittsburgh, PA	L 0–33	30,000	
October 14		Oglethorpe	Forbes Field; Pittsburgh, PA	W 21–6		
October 21	8:15 p.m.	West Virginia Wesleyan	Forbes Field; Pittsburgh, PA	L 6–7	7,000	
November 5		Washington & Jefferson	Forbes Field; Pittsburgh, PA	W 19–0		
November 11		South Dakota State	Forbes Field; Pittsburgh, PA	W 34–12	5,000	
November 18		at Catholic University	Griffith Stadium; Washington, DC	T 0–0	8,000	
November 24		Geneva	Forbes Field; Pittsburgh, PA	W 3–0		
All times are in Eastern time
