= 1932 Columbia Lions football team =

American college football season

1932 Columbia Lions football
- Conference: Independent
- Record: 7–1–1
- Head coach: Lou Little (3rd season)
- Home stadium: Baker Field

1932 Eastern college football independents records
	Conf.			Overall
Team	W	L	T	W		L		T
No. 5 Colgate		–		9	–	0	–	0
Brown		–		7	–	1	–	0
Columbia		–		7	–	1	–	1
Pittsburgh		–		8	–	1	–	2
No. 8 Army		–		8	–	2	–	0
Drexel		–		5	–	1	–	1
Massachusetts State		–		7	–	2	–	0
Villanova		–		7	–	2	–	0
Duquesne		–		7	–	2	–	1
Fordham		–		6	–	2	–	0
Penn		–		6	–	2	–	0
Temple		–		5	–	1	–	2
Tufts		–		5	–	1	–	2
Cornell		–		5	–	2	–	1
Franklin & Marshall		–		4	–	2	–	1
Boston College		–		4	–	2	–	2
La Salle		–		4	–	2	–	2
Harvard		–		5	–	3	–	0
NYU		–		5	–	3	–	0
Washington & Jefferson		–		5	–	3	–	1
Manhattan		–		6	–	3	–	2
Carnegie Tech		–		4	–	3	–	2
Bucknell		–		4	–	4	–	1
Syracuse		–		4	–	4	–	1
Princeton		–		2	–	2	–	3
Yale		–		2	–	2	–	3
Boston University		–		2	–	3	–	2
Vermont		–		2	–	4	–	1
CCNY		–		2	–	5	–	0
Penn State		–		2	–	5	–	0
Rankings from Dickinson System

The 1932 Columbia Lions football team was an American football team that represented Columbia University as an independent during the 1932 college football season. In its third season under head coach Lou Little, the team compiled a 7–1–1 record and outscored opponents 199 to 32. The team played its home games at Baker Field in Upper Manhattan.

== Schedule ==
Date	Opponent	Site	Result	Attendance	Source
September 24	Middlebury	Baker Field; New York, NY	W 51–0		
October 1	Lehigh	Baker Field; New York, NY	W 41–6	20,000	
October 8	Princeton	Baker Field; New York, NY	W 20–7	34,000	
October 15	Virginia	Baker Field; New York, NY	W 22–6		
October 22	Williams	Baker Field; New York, NY	W 46–0		
October 29	Cornell	Baker Field; New York, NY (rivalry)	W 6–0	35,000	
November 5	at Navy	Thompson Stadium; Annapolis, MD	W 7–6		
November 12	Brown	Baker Field; New York, NY	L 6–7		
November 19	Syracuse	Baker Field; New York, NY	T 0–0	3,000	
