= 1932 Carnegie Tech Tartans football team =

American college football season

1932 Carnegie Tech Tartans football
- Conference: Independent
- Record: 4–3–2
- Head coach: Walter Steffen (18th season)

1932 Eastern college football independents records
	Conf.			Overall
Team	W	L	T	W		L		T
No. 5 Colgate		–		9	–	0	–	0
Brown		–		7	–	1	–	0
Columbia		–		7	–	1	–	1
Pittsburgh		–		8	–	1	–	2
No. 8 Army		–		8	–	2	–	0
Drexel		–		5	–	1	–	1
Massachusetts State		–		7	–	2	–	0
Villanova		–		7	–	2	–	0
Duquesne		–		7	–	2	–	1
Fordham		–		6	–	2	–	0
Penn		–		6	–	2	–	0
Temple		–		5	–	1	–	2
Tufts		–		5	–	1	–	2
Cornell		–		5	–	2	–	1
Franklin & Marshall		–		4	–	2	–	1
Boston College		–		4	–	2	–	2
La Salle		–		4	–	2	–	2
Harvard		–		5	–	3	–	0
NYU		–		5	–	3	–	0
Washington & Jefferson		–		5	–	3	–	1
Manhattan		–		6	–	3	–	2
Carnegie Tech		–		4	–	3	–	2
Bucknell		–		4	–	4	–	1
Syracuse		–		4	–	4	–	1
Princeton		–		2	–	2	–	3
Yale		–		2	–	2	–	3
Boston University		–		2	–	3	–	2
Vermont		–		2	–	4	–	1
CCNY		–		2	–	5	–	0
Penn State		–		2	–	5	–	0
Rankings from Dickinson System

The 1932 Carnegie Tech Tartans football team represented the Carnegie Institute of Technology—now known as Carnegie Mellon University—as an independent during the 1932 college football season. Led by Walter Steffen in his 18th and final season as head coach, the Tartans compiled a record of 4–3–2.

== Schedule ==
Date	Time	Opponent	Site	Result	Attendance	Source
October 1		Geneva	Pittsburgh, PA	W 7–0		
October 8		Western Reserve	Pittsburgh, PA	W 19–0		
October 15		Washington & Jefferson	Pittsburgh, PA	T 6–6		
October 22		at Notre Dame	Notre Dame Stadium; Notre Dame, IN	L 0–42	30,000	
October 29		Temple	Pittsburgh, PA	T 7–7		
November 12		at Xavier	Corcoran Field; Cincinnati, OH	W 15–0	4,500	
November 19		at Pittsburgh	Pitt Stadium; Pittsburgh, PA	L 0–6	15,000	
November 24		at NYU	Yankee Stadium; Bronx, NY	L 6–13	30,000	
December 3	2:00 p.m.	at Georgetown	Griffith Stadium; Washington, DC	W 51–0	8,000	
All times are in Eastern time
