= 1932 Bucknell Bison football team =

American college football season

1932 Bucknell Bison football
- Conference: Independent
- Record: 4–4–1
- Head coach: Carl Snavely (6th season)
- Home stadium: Bucknell Stadium

1932 Eastern college football independents records
	Conf.			Overall
Team	W	L	T	W		L		T
No. 5 Colgate		–		9	–	0	–	0
Brown		–		7	–	1	–	0
Columbia		–		7	–	1	–	1
Pittsburgh		–		8	–	1	–	2
No. 8 Army		–		8	–	2	–	0
Drexel		–		5	–	1	–	1
Massachusetts State		–		7	–	2	–	0
Villanova		–		7	–	2	–	0
Duquesne		–		7	–	2	–	1
Fordham		–		6	–	2	–	0
Penn		–		6	–	2	–	0
Temple		–		5	–	1	–	2
Tufts		–		5	–	1	–	2
Cornell		–		5	–	2	–	1
Franklin & Marshall		–		4	–	2	–	1
Boston College		–		4	–	2	–	2
La Salle		–		4	–	2	–	2
Harvard		–		5	–	3	–	0
NYU		–		5	–	3	–	0
Washington & Jefferson		–		5	–	3	–	1
Manhattan		–		6	–	3	–	2
Carnegie Tech		–		4	–	3	–	2
Bucknell		–		4	–	4	–	1
Syracuse		–		4	–	4	–	1
Princeton		–		2	–	2	–	3
Yale		–		2	–	2	–	3
Boston University		–		2	–	3	–	2
Vermont		–		2	–	4	–	1
CCNY		–		2	–	5	–	0
Penn State		–		2	–	5	–	0
Rankings from Dickinson System

The 1932 Bucknell Bison football team was an American football team that represented Bucknell University as an independent during the 1932 college football season. In its sixth season under head coach Carl Snavely, the team compiled a 4–4–1 record.

The team played its home games at Bucknell Stadium in Lewisburg, Pennsylvania.

== Schedule ==
Date	Opponent	Site	Result	Attendance	Source
September 23	St. Thomas (PA)	Bucknell Stadium; Lewisburg, PA	W 35–0	7,500	
September 30	Albright	Bucknell Stadium; Lewisburg, PA	W 13–6		
October 8	at Fordham	Polo Grounds; New York, NY	L 0–30		
October 14	at Temple	Temple Stadium; Philadelphia, PA	L 0–12		
October 22	Lafayette^{†}	Bucknell Stadium; Lewisburg, PA	W 14–6		
October 29	vs. Villanova	Brooks Field; Scranton, PA	L 0–13		
November 5	Western Maryland	Bucknell Stadium; Lewisburg, PA	W 14–13		
November 12	at Washington & Jefferson	Washington, PA	L 0–14	7,000	
November 19	at Georgetown	Griffith Stadium; Washington, DC	T 6–6		
^{†}Homecoming
