= 1932 Army Cadets football team =

American college football season

1932 Army Cadets football
- Conference: Independent
- Record: 8–2
- Head coach: Ralph Sasse (3rd season)
- Captain: Milton Summerfelt
- Home stadium: Michie Stadium

1932 Eastern college football independents records
	Conf.			Overall
Team	W	L	T	W		L		T
No. 5 Colgate		–		9	–	0	–	0
Brown		–		7	–	1	–	0
Columbia		–		7	–	1	–	1
Pittsburgh		–		8	–	1	–	2
No. 8 Army		–		8	–	2	–	0
Drexel		–		5	–	1	–	1
Massachusetts State		–		7	–	2	–	0
Villanova		–		7	–	2	–	0
Duquesne		–		7	–	2	–	1
Fordham		–		6	–	2	–	0
Penn		–		6	–	2	–	0
Temple		–		5	–	1	–	2
Tufts		–		5	–	1	–	2
Cornell		–		5	–	2	–	1
Franklin & Marshall		–		4	–	2	–	1
Boston College		–		4	–	2	–	2
La Salle		–		4	–	2	–	2
Harvard		–		5	–	3	–	0
NYU		–		5	–	3	–	0
Washington & Jefferson		–		5	–	3	–	1
Manhattan		–		6	–	3	–	2
Carnegie Tech		–		4	–	3	–	2
Bucknell		–		4	–	4	–	1
Syracuse		–		4	–	4	–	1
Princeton		–		2	–	2	–	3
Yale		–		2	–	2	–	3
Boston University		–		2	–	3	–	2
Vermont		–		2	–	4	–	1
CCNY		–		2	–	5	–	0
Penn State		–		2	–	5	–	0
Rankings from Dickinson System

The 1932 Army Cadets football team represented the United States Military Academy as an independent during the 1932 college football season. In their third and final season under head coach Ralph Sasse, the Cadets compiled an 8–2 record, shut out eight of their ten opponents, and outscored all opponents by a combined total of 261 to 39. In the annual Army–Navy Game, the Cadets defeated the Midshipmen 20–0. The Cadets also defeated Harvard, 40 to 0. The team's two losses were to Pittsburgh by an 18 to 13 score and a 21–0 shutout by Notre Dame at Yankee Stadium.

Three Army players were recognized on the All-America team. Guard Milton Summerfelt was a consensus first-team player. End Dick King received first-team honors from the New York Sun, and second-team honors from the Associated Press (AP), Newspaper Enterprise Association (NEA), and International News Service (INS). Quarterback Felix Vidal received third-team honors from the AP.

== Schedule ==
Date	Opponent	Site	Result	Attendance	Source
October 1	Furman	Michie Stadium; West Point, NY	W 13–0		
October 8	Carleton	Michie Stadium; West Point, NY	W 57–0		
October 15	Pittsburgh	Michie Stadium; West Point, NY	L 13–18	20,000	
October 22	at Yale	Yale Bowl; New Haven, CT	W 20–0		
October 29	William & Mary	Michie Stadium; West Point, NY	W 33–0		
November 5	at Harvard	Harvard Stadium; Boston, MA	W 46–0	35,000	
November 12	North Dakota Agricultural	Michie Stadium; West Point, NY	W 52–0	10,000	
November 19	West Virginia Wesleyan	Michie Stadium; West Point, NY	W 7–0		
November 26	vs. Notre Dame	Yankee Stadium; Bronx, NY (rivalry)	L 0–21	80,000	
December 3	vs. Navy	Franklin Field; Philadelphia, PA (Army–Navy Game)	W 20–0	80,000	
