= 1932 Temple Owls football team =

American college football season

1932 Temple Owls football
- Conference: Independent
- Record: 5–1–2
- Head coach: Heinie Miller (8th season)
- Captain: Leon Whittock
- Home stadium: Temple Stadium

1932 Eastern college football independents records
	Conf.			Overall
Team	W	L	T	W		L		T
No. 5 Colgate		–		9	–	0	–	0
Brown		–		7	–	1	–	0
Columbia		–		7	–	1	–	1
Pittsburgh		–		8	–	1	–	2
No. 8 Army		–		8	–	2	–	0
Drexel		–		5	–	1	–	1
Massachusetts State		–		7	–	2	–	0
Villanova		–		7	–	2	–	0
Duquesne		–		7	–	2	–	1
Fordham		–		6	–	2	–	0
Penn		–		6	–	2	–	0
Temple		–		5	–	1	–	2
Tufts		–		5	–	1	–	2
Cornell		–		5	–	2	–	1
Franklin & Marshall		–		4	–	2	–	1
Boston College		–		4	–	2	–	2
La Salle		–		4	–	2	–	2
Harvard		–		5	–	3	–	0
NYU		–		5	–	3	–	0
Washington & Jefferson		–		5	–	3	–	1
Manhattan		–		6	–	3	–	2
Carnegie Tech		–		4	–	3	–	2
Bucknell		–		4	–	4	–	1
Syracuse		–		4	–	4	–	1
Princeton		–		2	–	2	–	3
Yale		–		2	–	2	–	3
Boston University		–		2	–	3	–	2
Vermont		–		2	–	4	–	1
CCNY		–		2	–	5	–	0
Penn State		–		2	–	5	–	0
Rankings from Dickinson System

The 1932 Temple Owls football team was an American football team that represented Temple University as an independent during the 1932 college football season. In its eighth and final season under head coach Heinie Miller, the team compiled a 5–1–2 record.

== Schedule ==
Date	Opponent	Site	Result	Attendance	Source
September 30	Thiel	Temple Stadium; Philadelphia, PA	W 31–0		
October 7	West Virginia	Temple Stadium; Philadelphia, PA	W 14–13	10,000	
October 14	Bucknell	Temple Stadium; Philadelphia, PA	W 12–0		
October 21	at Denver	DU Stadium; Denver, CO	W 14–0	13,000	
October 28	at Carnegie Tech	Pittsburgh, PA	T 7–7		
November 4	Haskell	Temple Stadium; Philadelphia, PA	T 14–14		
November 12	Penn State	Temple Stadium; Philadelphia, PA	W 13–12	15,000	
November 19	Villanova	Temple Stadium; Philadelphia, PA	L 0–7		
