= 1932 Fordham Rams football team =

American college football season

1932 Fordham Rams football
- Conference: Independent
- Record: 6–2
- Head coach: Frank Cavanaugh (6th season)
- Captain: Cornelius Murphy
- Home stadium: Fordham Field, Polo Grounds, Yankee Stadium

1932 Eastern college football independents records
	Conf.			Overall
Team	W	L	T	W		L		T
No. 5 Colgate		–		9	–	0	–	0
Brown		–		7	–	1	–	0
Columbia		–		7	–	1	–	1
Pittsburgh		–		8	–	1	–	2
No. 8 Army		–		8	–	2	–	0
Drexel		–		5	–	1	–	1
Massachusetts State		–		7	–	2	–	0
Villanova		–		7	–	2	–	0
Duquesne		–		7	–	2	–	1
Fordham		–		6	–	2	–	0
Penn		–		6	–	2	–	0
Temple		–		5	–	1	–	2
Tufts		–		5	–	1	–	2
Cornell		–		5	–	2	–	1
Franklin & Marshall		–		4	–	2	–	1
Boston College		–		4	–	2	–	2
La Salle		–		4	–	2	–	2
Harvard		–		5	–	3	–	0
NYU		–		5	–	3	–	0
Washington & Jefferson		–		5	–	3	–	1
Manhattan		–		6	–	3	–	2
Carnegie Tech		–		4	–	3	–	2
Bucknell		–		4	–	4	–	1
Syracuse		–		4	–	4	–	1
Princeton		–		2	–	2	–	3
Yale		–		2	–	2	–	3
Boston University		–		2	–	3	–	2
Vermont		–		2	–	4	–	1
CCNY		–		2	–	5	–	0
Penn State		–		2	–	5	–	0
Rankings from Dickinson System

The 1932 Fordham Rams football team was an American football team that represented Fordham University as an independent during the 1932 college football season. In its sixth year under head coach Frank Cavanaugh, Fordham compiled a 6–2 record, shut out five of eight opponents, and outscored all opponents by a total of 193 to 28.

== Schedule ==
Date	Opponent	Site	Result	Attendance	Source
October 1	Baltimore	Fordham Field; Bronx, NY	W 69–0		
October 8	Bucknell	Polo Grounds; New York, NY	W 30–0		
October 15	Lebanon Valley	Polo Grounds; New York, NY	W 52–0		
October 22	Michigan State	Polo Grounds; New York, NY	L 13–19	20,000	
October 29	at Boston College	Alumni Field; Chestnut Hill, MA	L 0–3		
November 5	Saint Mary's	Polo Grounds; New York, NY	W 14–0	45,000	
November 12	NYU	Yankee Stadium; Bronx, NY	W 7–0	40,000	
November 19	Oregon State	Polo Grounds; New York, NY	W 8–6	5,000	
