= 1932 Washington & Jefferson Presidents football team =

American college football season

1932 Washington & Jefferson Presidents football
- Conference: Independent
- Record: 5–3–1
- Head coach: Hank Day (1st season)

1932 Eastern college football independents records
| | Conf. | | | Overall |
| Team | W | L | T | W | | L | | T |
|---|---|---|---|---|---|---|---|---|
| No. 5 Colgate | | – | | 9 | – | 0 | – | 0 |
| Brown | | – | | 7 | – | 1 | – | 0 |
| Columbia | | – | | 7 | – | 1 | – | 1 |
| Pittsburgh | | – | | 8 | – | 1 | – | 2 |
| No. 8 Army | | – | | 8 | – | 2 | – | 0 |
| Drexel | | – | | 5 | – | 1 | – | 1 |
| Massachusetts State | | – | | 7 | – | 2 | – | 0 |
| Villanova | | – | | 7 | – | 2 | – | 0 |
| Duquesne | | – | | 7 | – | 2 | – | 1 |
| Fordham | | – | | 6 | – | 2 | – | 0 |
| Penn | | – | | 6 | – | 2 | – | 0 |
| Temple | | – | | 5 | – | 1 | – | 2 |
| Tufts | | – | | 5 | – | 1 | – | 2 |
| Cornell | | – | | 5 | – | 2 | – | 1 |
| Franklin & Marshall | | – | | 4 | – | 2 | – | 1 |
| Boston College | | – | | 4 | – | 2 | – | 2 |
| La Salle | | – | | 4 | – | 2 | – | 2 |
| Harvard | | – | | 5 | – | 3 | – | 0 |
| NYU | | – | | 5 | – | 3 | – | 0 |
| Washington & Jefferson | | – | | 5 | – | 3 | – | 1 |
| Manhattan | | – | | 6 | – | 3 | – | 2 |
| Carnegie Tech | | – | | 4 | – | 3 | – | 2 |
| Bucknell | | – | | 4 | – | 4 | – | 1 |
| Syracuse | | – | | 4 | – | 4 | – | 1 |
| Princeton | | – | | 2 | – | 2 | – | 3 |
| Yale | | – | | 2 | – | 2 | – | 3 |
| Boston University | | – | | 2 | – | 3 | – | 2 |
| Vermont | | – | | 2 | – | 4 | – | 1 |
| CCNY | | – | | 2 | – | 5 | – | 0 |
| Penn State | | – | | 2 | – | 5 | – | 0 |
Rankings from Dickinson System

The 1932 Washington & Jefferson Presidents football team was an American football team that represented Washington & Jefferson College as an independent during the 1932 college football season. The team compiled a 5–3–1 record and outscored opponents by a total of 94 to 38. Hank Day was the head coach.

== Schedule ==
| Date | Opponent | Site | Result | Attendance | Source |
|---|---|---|---|---|---|
| October 1 | West Virginia Wesleyan | Washington, PA | W 20–0 | | |
| October 7 | at Detroit | University of Detroit Stadium; Detroit, MI | L 0–7 | | |
| October 15 | at Carnegie Tech | Pittsburgh, PA | T 6–6 | | |
| October 22 | at Xavier | Corcoran Field; Cincinnati, OH | W 34–0 | 9,000 | |
| October 29 | at Lafayette | Fisher Field; Easton, PA | W 7–0 | | |
| November 5 | at Duquesne | Pittsburgh, PA | L 0–19 | | |
| November 12 | Bucknell^{†} | Washington, PA | W 14–0 | 7,000 | |
| November 19 | at Marquette | Marquette Stadium; Milwaukee, WI | L 0–6 | 3,000 | |
| November 26 | vs. West Virginia | Wheeling, WV | W 13–0 | 7,500 | |
^{†}Homecoming
