= 1932 Colgate Red Raiders football team =

American college football season

1932 Colgate Red Raiders football

Co-national champion (Parke H. Davis)
- Conference: Independent
- Record: 9–0
- Head coach: Andrew Kerr (4th season)
- Offensive scheme: Double-wing
- Captain: Robert Smith
- Home stadium: Whitnall Field

1932 Eastern college football independents records
	Conf.			Overall
Team	W	L	T	W		L		T
No. 5 Colgate		–		9	–	0	–	0
Brown		–		7	–	1	–	0
Columbia		–		7	–	1	–	1
Pittsburgh		–		8	–	1	–	2
No. 8 Army		–		8	–	2	–	0
Drexel		–		5	–	1	–	1
Massachusetts State		–		7	–	2	–	0
Villanova		–		7	–	2	–	0
Duquesne		–		7	–	2	–	1
Fordham		–		6	–	2	–	0
Penn		–		6	–	2	–	0
Temple		–		5	–	1	–	2
Tufts		–		5	–	1	–	2
Cornell		–		5	–	2	–	1
Franklin & Marshall		–		4	–	2	–	1
Boston College		–		4	–	2	–	2
La Salle		–		4	–	2	–	2
Harvard		–		5	–	3	–	0
NYU		–		5	–	3	–	0
Washington & Jefferson		–		5	–	3	–	1
Manhattan		–		6	–	3	–	2
Carnegie Tech		–		4	–	3	–	2
Bucknell		–		4	–	4	–	1
Syracuse		–		4	–	4	–	1
Princeton		–		2	–	2	–	3
Yale		–		2	–	2	–	3
Boston University		–		2	–	3	–	2
Vermont		–		2	–	4	–	1
CCNY		–		2	–	5	–	0
Penn State		–		2	–	5	–	0
Rankings from Dickinson System

The 1932 Colgate Red Raiders football team represented Colgate University in during the 1932 college football season. Fourth-year head coach Andrew Kerr led Colgate to a perfect record, and the team did not allow an opponent to score throughout the entire season. Nevertheless, Colgate did not receive an expected invitation to the Rose Bowl, and as such, the team was called "undefeated, untied, unscored upon, and uninvited". The 1932 Colgate eleven is one of only three college football teams since 1920 to have finished a perfect season without being scored upon. The new maroon uniforms adopted by this team inspired the nickname for the school's athletics program: the "Red Raiders". Parke H. Davis named Colgate a co-national champion team alongside Michigan and USC.

== Schedule ==
Date	Opponent	Site	Result	Attendance	Source
September 24	St. Lawrence	Whitnall Field; Hamilton, NY	W 41–0		
October 1	Case	Whitnall Field; Hamilton, NY	W 27–0		
October 8	Niagara	Whitnall Field; Hamilton, NY	W 47–0		
October 15	at Lafayette	Fisher Field; Easton, PA	W 35–0		
October 22	at NYU	Yankee Stadium; Bronx, NY	W 14–0	35,000	
October 29	Penn State	Whitnall Field; Hamilton, NY	W 31–0	4,000	
November 5	Mississippi College	Whitnall Field; Hamilton, NY	W 32–0		
November 12	at Syracuse	Archbold Stadium; Syracuse, NY (rivalry)	W 16–0	25,000	
November 24	at Brown	Brown Stadium; Providence, RI	W 21–0		

== Season ==
Colgate was led by fourth-year head coach Andrew Kerr, who had a previous stint at Stanford at the request of Pop Warner. Kerr employed a complex offensive scheme built around Warner's double-wing formation with an additional emphasis on trick plays using reverses and laterals. In 1932, Colgate joined a very small number of football teams to have ever compiled an undefeated, untied, and unscored upon season. Since 1920, only Duke in 1938 and Tennessee in 1939 have matched the feat. Colgate was also the first Eastern team to have accomplished the deed since 1910 when both Navy and Pittsburgh did so. Colgate won its nine games by a combined margin of 264–0. Throughout the season, Colgate recorded a total of 99 first downs to their opponents' 21; 1,581 yards of total offense to 255; and 45 pass completions to 13. The closest match was a 14–0 victory over the NYU Violets at Yankee Stadium. Time magazine described the NYU defense as porous against Colgate's short-range passing and ground attack, and said the Violets' line "seemed to have a hinge in the middle." In that game, Colgate also debuted new uniforms that featured maroon trousers and a new nickname: the "Red Raiders of Chenango".

In the final game, the likewise undefeated and untied Brown Bears came the closest of any opponent to scoring against Colgate. At the end of the second quarter, with the score at 6–0, the Bears were at the Colgate one-yard line with time for one final play in the half. Brown's quarterback, Robert Ramsay Chase, held onto the ball on a rushing attempt. He was brought down close to the goal line, and the referees measured it and determined the ball was still two inches shy of the end zone. Instead of playing conservatively to preserve their lead and unblemished record, Colgate took an aggressive approach in the second half. This included a blocked punt which Colgate converted for a safety. Later, Colgate halfback Whitey Ask intercepted a pass on his own 20-yard line, and Colgate scored again. In a desperate attempt to score, Brown attempted a fourth down pass, but it fell incomplete and the Bears turned over on downs. Colgate scored on their next possession with a pass from Conroy to Bodganski, for the final score of 21–0.

== Postseason ==
Upon the season's conclusion, Colgate felt there was the possibility of a Rose Bowl invitation. However, despite the team's remarkable record, they were not invited to participate in the 1933 Rose Bowl. The team reportedly had their bags packed to go to the Rose Bowl, but the call never came. This led some observers to refer to the team as "undefeated, untied, unscored upon, and uninvited." Pittsburgh was the eastern team to appear in the Rose Bowl, where they lost to USC, 35–0.

Parke H. Davis, an NCAA-recognized selector, named Colgate a national championship team (co-champions with Michigan and Southern Cal). After the season, Colgate guard Robert Smith was named a first-team All-American by the All-American Board, the International News Service, and Liberty magazine. Quarterback Charles R. Soleau was named an All-American Quarterback and was also named to the 1932 "All-Scout" team by Boys' Life magazine.

The 1932 team's use of maroon uniforms led to Colgate's nickname, the "Red Raiders", although in 2001 this was expurgated to simply "Raiders" due to a perceived racial connotation.
