= 1932 NYU Violets football team =

American college football season

1932 NYU Violets football
- Conference: Independent
- Record: 5–3
- Head coach: Howard Cann (1st season)
- Home stadium: Ohio Field; Yankee Stadium

1932 Eastern college football independents records
	Conf.			Overall
Team	W	L	T	W		L		T
No. 5 Colgate		–		9	–	0	–	0
Brown		–		7	–	1	–	0
Columbia		–		7	–	1	–	1
Pittsburgh		–		8	–	1	–	2
No. 8 Army		–		8	–	2	–	0
Drexel		–		5	–	1	–	1
Massachusetts State		–		7	–	2	–	0
Villanova		–		7	–	2	–	0
Duquesne		–		7	–	2	–	1
Fordham		–		6	–	2	–	0
Penn		–		6	–	2	–	0
Temple		–		5	–	1	–	2
Tufts		–		5	–	1	–	2
Cornell		–		5	–	2	–	1
Franklin & Marshall		–		4	–	2	–	1
Boston College		–		4	–	2	–	2
La Salle		–		4	–	2	–	2
Harvard		–		5	–	3	–	0
NYU		–		5	–	3	–	0
Washington & Jefferson		–		5	–	3	–	1
Manhattan		–		6	–	3	–	2
Carnegie Tech		–		4	–	3	–	2
Bucknell		–		4	–	4	–	1
Syracuse		–		4	–	4	–	1
Princeton		–		2	–	2	–	3
Yale		–		2	–	2	–	3
Boston University		–		2	–	3	–	2
Vermont		–		2	–	4	–	1
CCNY		–		2	–	5	–	0
Penn State		–		2	–	5	–	0
Rankings from Dickinson System

The 1932 NYU Violets football team was an American football team that represented New York University as an independent during the 1932 college football season. In their first year under head coach Howard Cann, the team compiled a 5–3 record.

== Schedule ==
Date	Opponent	Site	Result	Attendance	Source
October 1	Hobart	Ohio Field; Bronx, NY	W 33–0	10,000	
October 8	Rutgers	Yankee Stadium; Bronx, NY	W 21–0	12,000	
October 15	Georgetown	Yankee Stadium; Bronx, NY	W 39–0	30,000	
October 22	Colgate	Yankee Stadium; Bronx, NY	L 0–14	35,000	
October 29	Purdue	Yankee Stadium; Bronx, NY	L 9–34	25,000	
November 5	Georgia	Yankee Stadium; Bronx, NY	W 13–7	15,000	
November 12	vs. Fordham	Yankee Stadium; Bronx, NY	L 0–7	40,000	
November 24	Carnegie Tech	Yankee Stadium; Bronx, NY	W 13–6	30,000	
