= 1932 Villanova Wildcats football team =

American college football season

1932 Villanova Wildcats football
- Conference: Independent
- Record: 7–2
- Head coach: Harry Stuhldreher (8th season)
- Captain: Edward Hickey
- Home stadium: Villanova Stadium

1932 Eastern college football independents records
	Conf.			Overall
Team	W	L	T	W		L		T
No. 5 Colgate		–		9	–	0	–	0
Brown		–		7	–	1	–	0
Columbia		–		7	–	1	–	1
Pittsburgh		–		8	–	1	–	2
No. 8 Army		–		8	–	2	–	0
Drexel		–		5	–	1	–	1
Massachusetts State		–		7	–	2	–	0
Villanova		–		7	–	2	–	0
Duquesne		–		7	–	2	–	1
Fordham		–		6	–	2	–	0
Penn		–		6	–	2	–	0
Temple		–		5	–	1	–	2
Tufts		–		5	–	1	–	2
Cornell		–		5	–	2	–	1
Franklin & Marshall		–		4	–	2	–	1
Boston College		–		4	–	2	–	2
La Salle		–		4	–	2	–	2
Harvard		–		5	–	3	–	0
NYU		–		5	–	3	–	0
Washington & Jefferson		–		5	–	3	–	1
Manhattan		–		6	–	3	–	2
Carnegie Tech		–		4	–	3	–	2
Bucknell		–		4	–	4	–	1
Syracuse		–		4	–	4	–	1
Princeton		–		2	–	2	–	3
Yale		–		2	–	2	–	3
Boston University		–		2	–	3	–	2
Vermont		–		2	–	4	–	1
CCNY		–		2	–	5	–	0
Penn State		–		2	–	5	–	0
Rankings from Dickinson System

The 1932 Villanova Wildcats football team represented the Villanova University during the 1932 college football season. The head coach was Harry Stuhldreher, coaching his seventh season with the Wildcats. The team played their home games at Villanova Stadium in Villanova, Pennsylvania.

== Schedule ==
Date	Time	Opponent	Site	Result	Attendance	Source
September 24		Ursinus	Villanova Stadium; Villanova, PA	W 26–2		
October 1		South Carolina	Villanova Stadium; Villanova, PA	L 6–7	7,500	
October 8		Gettysburg	Villanova Stadium; Villanova, PA	W 31–0		
October 15		Seton Hall	Villanova Stadium; Villanova, PA	W 46–0		
October 22		Loyola (MD)	Villanova Stadium; Villanova, PA	W 31–7		
October 29		vs. Bucknell	Brooks Field; Scranton, PA	W 13–0		
November 5	2:00 p.m.	at Boston College	Alumni Field; Chestnut Hill, MA	W 20–9		
November 14		Detroit	Villanova Stadium; Villanova, PA	L 12–28		
November 21		at Temple	Temple Stadium; Philadelphia, PA	W 7–0		
