= 1932 Pittsburgh Panthers football team =

American college football season

1932 Pittsburgh Panthers football
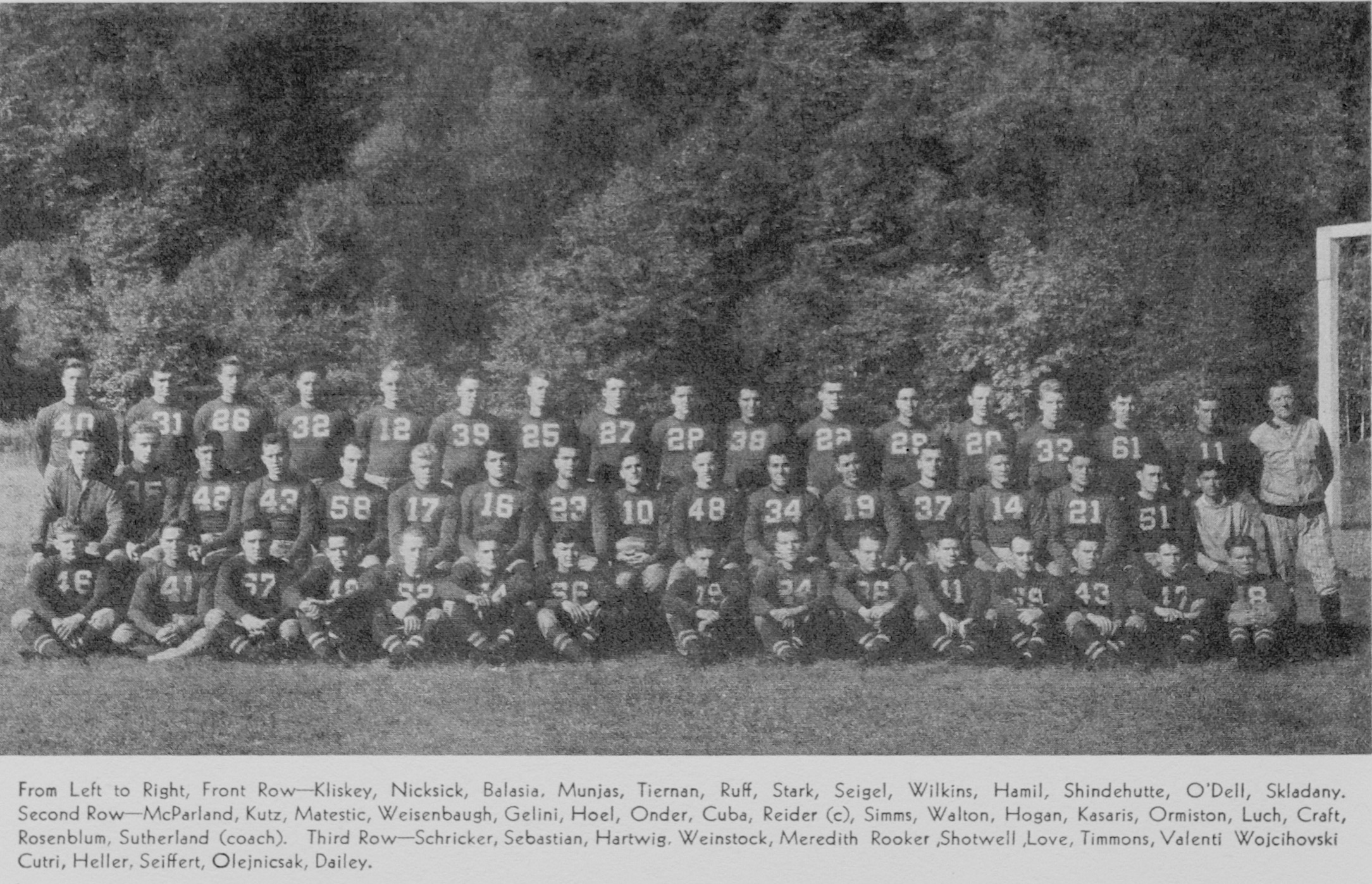

Rose Bowl, L 0–35 vs USC
- Conference: Independent
- Record: 8–1–2
- Head coach: Jock Sutherland (9th season)
- Offensive scheme: Single-wing
- Captain: Paul Reider
- Home stadium: Pitt Stadium

1932 Eastern college football independents records
	Conf.			Overall
Team	W	L	T	W		L		T
No. 5 Colgate		–		9	–	0	–	0
Brown		–		7	–	1	–	0
Columbia		–		7	–	1	–	1
Pittsburgh		–		8	–	1	–	2
No. 8 Army		–		8	–	2	–	0
Drexel		–		5	–	1	–	1
Massachusetts State		–		7	–	2	–	0
Villanova		–		7	–	2	–	0
Duquesne		–		7	–	2	–	1
Fordham		–		6	–	2	–	0
Penn		–		6	–	2	–	0
Temple		–		5	–	1	–	2
Tufts		–		5	–	1	–	2
Cornell		–		5	–	2	–	1
Franklin & Marshall		–		4	–	2	–	1
Boston College		–		4	–	2	–	2
La Salle		–		4	–	2	–	2
Harvard		–		5	–	3	–	0
NYU		–		5	–	3	–	0
Washington & Jefferson		–		5	–	3	–	1
Manhattan		–		6	–	3	–	2
Carnegie Tech		–		4	–	3	–	2
Bucknell		–		4	–	4	–	1
Syracuse		–		4	–	4	–	1
Princeton		–		2	–	2	–	3
Yale		–		2	–	2	–	3
Boston University		–		2	–	3	–	2
Vermont		–		2	–	4	–	1
CCNY		–		2	–	5	–	0
Penn State		–		2	–	5	–	0
Rankings from Dickinson System

The 1932 Pittsburgh Panthers football team was an American football team that represented the University of Pittsburgh as an independent during the 1932 college football season. In its ninth season under head coach Jock Sutherland, the team compiled an 8–1–2 record, shut out eight of its eleven opponents, suffered its sole loss to USC in the 1933 Rose Bowl, and outscored all opponents by a total of 182 to 60. The team played its home games at Pitt Stadium in Pittsburgh.

Although there was no AP Poll to determine a national champion in 1932, the Knute K. Rockne Trophy was presented at the end of the season to the team deemed to be the national champion using the Dickinson System, a rating system developed by Frank G. Dickinson, a professor of economics of the University of Illinois. Michigan won the Rockne Trophy. Pittsburgh was ranked third.

Halfback Warren Heller and end Joe Skladany were both consensus first-team selections to the 1932 All-America team, and center Joseph Tormey earned third team United Press All-America honors.

== Schedule ==
Date	Opponent	Site	Result	Attendance	Source
September 24	Ohio Northern	Pitt Stadium; Pittsburgh, PA	W 47–0	10,000	
October 1	at West Virginia	Mountaineer Field; Morgantown, WV (rivalry)	W 40–0	15,000	
October 8	Duquesne	Pitt Stadium; Pittsburgh, PA	W 33–0	30,000	
October 15	at Army	Michie Stadium; West Point, NY	W 18–13	20,000	
October 22	Ohio State^{†}	Pitt Stadium; Pittsburgh, PA	T 0–0	30,000	
October 29	Notre Dame	Pitt Stadium; Pittsburgh, PA	W 12–0	60,000	
November 5	at Penn	Franklin Field; Philadelphia, PA	W 19–12	70,000	
November 12	at Nebraska	Memorial Stadium; Lincoln, NE	T 0–0	24,720	
November 19	Carnegie Tech	Pitt Stadium; Pittsburgh, PA	W 6–0	15,000	
November 26	Stanford	Pitt Stadium; Pittsburgh, PA	W 7–0	35,000	
January 2, 1933	vs. USC	Rose Bowl; Pasadena, CA (Rose Bowl)	L 0–35	83,000	
^{†}Homecoming

== Preseason ==
Paul Reider was elected by his teammates to captain the Panthers, and W. Don Harrison announced that Jack McParland and Elmer Rosenblum were selected to be co-student managers for the varsity team through the 1932 football season.

On March 18, Coach Sutherland welcomed 60 candidates to spring practice. The Post-Gazette reported: "The Pitt coach is anxious to get under way, as he has the task of building an entirely new varsity line, as well as finding a punter...ahead of him." The spring session came to an end on April 23 with a regulation football game between the varsity and second team. Sophomore Henry Weisenbaugh scored a touchdown in the second quarter for the second teamers. Varsity back Warren Heller tied the score in the third period, but Clarence Hasson of the second team broke the tie in the last stanza with his touchdown and Zora Alpert added the point after. The second team triumphed 13 to 6.

On September 8, 50 Pitt players reported to Camp Hamilton for two weeks of preseason training. The Sun-Telegraph observed: "Despite the fact that the hardest football schedule in Pitt history lies ahead, and the entire varsity wall of 1931 rated by many the best in Pitt history is missing, Sutherland is so well pleased by the condition of his team and by the mental attitude of the players that he is almost able to forget his troubles for five or ten minutes at a time."

Due to the Depression, the athletic department lowered the ticket prices for the 1932 schedule. Box seat season tickets were lowered from $23.00 to $18.50; sideline seats from $15.00 to $14.00; and end seats from $9.50 to $7.60. Individual game tickets were lowered fifty cents to a dollar depending on the section. Boys under 16 were admitted to the Ohio Northern game for a dime, and the special boys' price was a quarter for the remaining home games.

== Coaching staff ==
1932 Pittsburgh Panthers football staff
Coaching staff: John B. "Jock" Sutherland – Head coach; Andy Gustafson – Assistant coach; Joe Donchess – assistant end coach; Ray Montgomery – assistant guard coach; Bill Kern – assistant tackle coach; Edward Baker – assistant backfield coach; Eddie Schultz – assistant line coach; Ulhardt Hangartner – Assistant coach - scout; Roscoe “Skip” Gougler – Freshman coach; Ralph Daugherty – Assistant coach	Support staff: Dr. Ralph Shanor – team physician; George Moore – team trainer; Percy S. Browne – custodian of equipment; W. D. Harrison - director of athletics; James Hagan – assistant director of athletics; Frank Carver – Publicity Director; Elmer Rosenblum – co-student manager; Jack McParland – co-student manager

== Roster ==
1932 Pittsburgh Panthers football roster
Player	Position	Games	Height	Weight	Class	Prep School	Hometown
Paul Reider*	halfback	7	5' 10"	156	1933	Bellefonte Academy	New Castle. PA
Theodore Dailey*	end	10	5' 10"	162	1933	Phillipsburg H. S.	Phillipsburg, NJ
John Meredith*	tackle	9	6'	180	1934	Bellefonte Academy	Fairmont, WV
Ken Ormiston*	guard	8	5' 11"	174	1935	Kiski School	Pittsburgh, PA
Joseph Tormey*	center	11	5' 11"	180	1933	Erie Academy	Erie, PA
Tarciscio Onder*	guard	11	5' 11"	197	1934	Jeannette H. S.	Jeannette, PA
Robert Hoel*	tackle	8	5' 11"	193	1935	Evanston Twp. H. S.	Evanston, IL
Joe Skladany*	end	11	5' 8"	184	1934	Larksville H. S.	Larksville, PA
Robert Hogan*	quarterback	11	5' 10"	180	1934	Meadville H. S.	Meadville, PA
Warren Heller*	halfback	11	5' 10"	155	1933	Steelton H. S.	Steelton, PA
John Luch	fullback	2	5' 10"	190	1933	Warwood H. S.	Wheeling, WV
Louis Wojcihovski	end	4	6' 1"	170	1935	Weston H. S.	Weston, WV
Paul Cuba*	guard	11	5' 11"	180	1933	New Castle H. S.	New Castle, PA
Francis Seigel*	guard	6	5' 10"	173	1933	Central H. S.	Sioux City, IA
George Shotwell*	center	9	5' 10"	165	1935	Hanover Twp. H. S.	Wilkes-Barre, PA
Charles Hartwig*	guard	11	5' 11"	170	1934	Warwood H. S.	Wheeling, WV
John Love	tackle	3	6' 1"	196	1934	Jeannette H. S.	Jeannette, PA
Robert Timmons	end	5	6'	168	1934	Allegheny H. S.	Pittsburgh, PA
Rocco Cutri	quarterback	5	6'	170	1933	Erie Academy	Erie, PA
Melvin Brown	halfback	2	5' 9"	160	1933	Central H. S.	Pittsburgh, PA
Mike Sebastian*	halfback	11	5' 10"	167	1934	Sharon H. S.	Sharon, Pa.
Isadore Weinstock*	fullback	11	6'	194	1935	Coughlin H. S.	Wilkes-Barre, PA
Karl P. Seiffert	end	3	6'	175	1935	Jeannette H. S.	Jeannette, PA
Frank Walton*	tackle	11	5' 10"	197	1934	Beaver Falls H. S.	Beaver Falls, PA
Frank W. Kutz	guard	1	6'	180	1935	Montgomery School	McKeesport, PA
Leslie C. Wilkins	center	1	5' 10"	178	1935	Kiski School	Rock Falls, IL
George Kasaris	guard	0	6'	176	1935	Danielson H. S.	Danielson, CT
John Valenti	tackle	5	6' 2"	230	1934	Pierce School (Phila.)	Media, PA
Harvey E. Rooker*	end	10	6' 1"	179	1935	Tarentum H. S.	Tarentum, PA
Jack Schricker	end	0	5' 10"	160	1934	Carrick H. S.	Carrick, PA
Michael Nicksick	halfback	3	5' 10"	164	1935	Burgettstown H. S.	Burgettstown, PA
Richard Matesic	halfback	5	5' 11"	176	1934	Bellefonte Academy	Wheeling, WV
Henry A. Weisenbaugh*	halfback	10	5'10"	174	1935	Tarentum H. S.	Tarentum, PA
William Hasson	fullback	1	5' 7"	170	1934	South H. S.	Pittsburgh, PA
Miller Munjas*	halfback	10	5' 10"	160	1935	Bellaire H. S.	Bellaire, OH
Nicholas Kliskey	fullback	1	5' 7"	186	1935	Scott H. S.	North Braddock, PA
Howard O'Dell*	halfback	6	5' 9"	160	1934	Central H. S.	Sioux City, IA
James Simms	halfback	4	5' 10"	165	1934	Kiski School	Monongahela, PA
Marwood Stark	guard	2	5' 10"	169	1935	Allentown H. S.	Allentown, PA
George Schindehutte	guard	1	5' 9"	170	1933	McKees Rocks H. S.	McKees Rocks, PA
Arthur Craft	end	1	6'	179	1934	New Castle H. S.	New Castle, PA
Frank Tiernan	tackle	1	6'	185	1934	Sewickley H. S.	Sewickley, PA
Karl Kleinburg	tackle	1	6'	180	1935	Collinwood H. S.	Cleveland, OH
Arthur Sekay*	halfback	1	5' 9"	155	1933	Schenley H. S.	Pittsburgh, PA
Arthur Ruff	halfback	0	5' 9"	150	1935	Etna H. S.	Etna, PA
Walter Balasia	halfback	1	5' 10"	160	1935	Hanover Twp. H. S.	Wilkes-Barre, PA
Howard Gelini	quarterback	1	5' 10"	170	1934	Weirton H. S.	Weirton, WV
William Hamel	guard	1	5' 10"	169	1935	Carrick H.S.	Carrick, PA
Stanley Oleojnicsak	tackle	3	5' 11"	180	1935	Bellaire H. S.	Bellaire, OH
Edward Thompson	tackle	1	6'	197	1935		Philadelphia, PA
Theodore Schuda	end	0	5' 10"	170	1935		Trafford, PA
John E. McParland*	co-student manager				1934	Peabody H. S.	Pittsburgh, PA
Elmer Rosenblum*	co-student manager				1933	Stamford H. S.	Stamford, CT
* Letterman

== Game summaries ==
=== Ohio Northern ===
Week 1: Ohio Northern at Pitt

Team	1	2	3	4	Total
Ohio Northern	0	0	0	0	0
• Pitt	14	12	7	14	47

- Date: September 24, 1932
- Location: Pitt Stadium
  Pittsburgh, PA
- Game start: 2:00 p.m.
- Game attendance: 12,000
- Game weather: fair and warm
- Referee: W. H. Friesell, Jr. (Princeton)

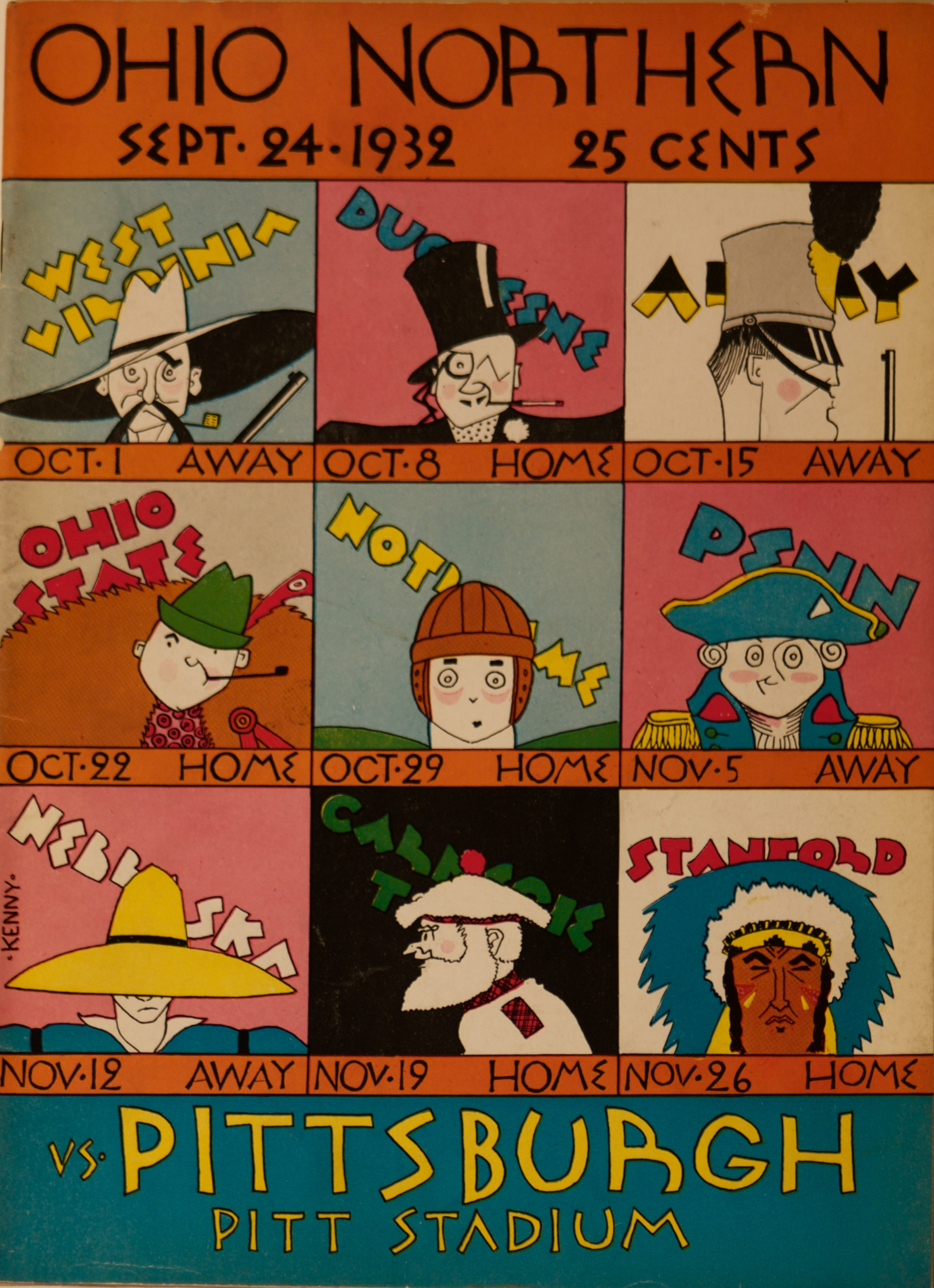
Program for September 24, 1932 game vs. Ohio Northern

The Panthers opened their season at home on September 24 against the Ohio Northern Polar Bears, who last played Pitt in 1913. Pitt led the series 6–0 and had outscored the Polar Bears 179–0. Second-year head coach Harris Lamb led the 1931 team to a record setting 6–2 season. The Pitt News noted: "The Ohio boys are not exactly hopeful of beating the Panthers, but expect to offer more opposition than was afforded by Miami U., which faded before Pitt's attack in last year's opener."

Chester L. Smith of The Pittsburgh Press wrote: "This afternoon's match with the Polar Bears from Ada, O., is counted on by Dr. Jock Sutherland, the Pitt coach, to enable him to try out his first, second and third elevens. Captain Reider and his varsity mates will be on the field at the kickoff, but they will not remain in action long." Projected starter, fullback John Luch (appendicitis) was the only Panther on the roster unable to play.

Pitt drubbed the Polar Bears 47–0, as forty-three Panthers saw action. The Panthers scored seven touchdowns. Both Warren Heller and James Simms each scored two. Isadore Weinstock, Paul Reider and Richard Matesic contributed one apiece. Weinstock kicked three extra points and Tarciscio Onder converted two. Pitt accumulated 120 yards in penalties, which cost them three more scoring chances. The Pitt defense was also impressive as, it only allowed one first down and held the Northern offense to negative 74 yards for the game.

The Polar Bears finished the season with a 4–2–1 record. The Pittsburgh Panthers and Ohio Northern Polar Bears would not meet on the gridiron again.

The Pitt starting lineup for the game against Ohio Northern was Theodore Dailey (left end), Paul Cuba left tackle), Charles Hartwig (left guard), Joseph Tormey (center), Tarciscio Onder (right guard), Robert Hoel (right tackle), Joseph Skladany (right end), Bob Hogan (quarterback), Warren Heller (left halfback), Paul Reider (right halfback) and Isadore Weinstock (fullback). Substitutes appearing in the game for Pitt were Louis Wojcihovski, Harvey Rooker, Arthur Craft, John Meredith, John Valenti, Ken Ormiston, Marwood Stark, George Shindehutte, George Shotwell, Leslie Wilkins, Francis Seigel, Frank Tiernan, Robert Timmons, Frank Walton, John Love, Stanley Oleojnicsak, Rocco Cutri, Miller Munjas, Howard O'Dell, James Simms, Melvin Brown, Walter Balasia, Mike Sebastian, Richard Matesic, Nicolas Kliskey, Arthur Sekay, Henry Weisenbaugh and Clarence Hasson.

Scoring summary

Quarter	Time	Drive			Team	Scoring information	Score	
Quarter	Time	Plays	Yards	TOP	Team	Scoring information	Ohio Northern	Pittsburgh
1		9	87		Pittsburgh	Warren Heller 12-yard touchdown run, Isadore Weinstock kick good	0	7
1		4	45		Pittsburgh	Weinstock 6-yard touchdown run, Weinstock kick good	0	14
2		5	28		Pittsburgh	Paul Reider 28-yard touchdown reception from Heller, Weinstock kick no good	0	20
2		9	45		Pittsburgh	Heller 3-yard touchdown run, Tarciscio Onder kick no good	0	26
3		6	34		Pittsburgh	James Simms 17-yard touchdown run, Onder kick good	0	33
4		1	19		Pittsburgh	Simms 19-yard touchdown run, Onder kick good	0	40
4		7	44		Pittsburgh	Richard Matesic 1-yard touchdown run, Weinstock kick good	0	47
"TOP" = time of possession. For other American football terms, see Glossary of American football.							0	47

=== At West Virginia ===
Week 2: Pitt at West Virginia

Team	1	2	3	4	Total
• Pitt	20	7	7	6	40
West Virginia	0	0	0	0	0

- Date: October 1, 1932
- Location: Mountaineer Field
  Morgantown, WV
- Game start: 2:30 p.m.
- Game weather: warm and sunny
- Referee: Dexter W. Very (Penn State)

On October 1, the 28th edition of the Backyard Brawl was played at Mountaineer Field in Morgantown, WV. The Panthers led the series 18–8–1. Second-year coach Greasy Neale's squad was 0–1 after being upset at Forbes Field by Duquesne (3–0) in their opening game. The Mountaineers were optimistic playing on their home turf, but their lineup was missing two starters due to injuries – end Will Sortet and fullback Patsy Slate. The Pitt Weekly noted: "When West Virginia wins a football game, that's news for Morgantown, but when West Virginia happens to beat Pitt, the football season for the Mountaineers is regarded as a howling success."

On Friday, September 30, the Panther entourage bussed to Uniontown, PA for an overnight stay. The team arrived in Morgantown on Saturday morning. They lunched at the Morgantown Country Club prior to suiting up for the game. Coach Sutherland's lineup was missing two starters. Captain Paul Reider was injured in the Ohio Northern game, and center Joseph Tormey contracted a severe cold. Mike Sebastian replaced Reider and George Shotwell replaced Tormey.

Home field was no advantage, as the Panthers manhandled the Mountaineers. Mike Sebastian, Warren Heller and Isadore Weinstock each scored a touchdown in the first quarter, and Weinstock added two placements for a 20 to 0 lead. Sutherland enlisted the second team for the second period in which fullback Henry Weisenbaugh scampered 6 yards for his first touchdown and Dick Matesic added the point after. The Panthers led 27 to 0 at halftime. The Pitt lineup of second and third stringers added a touchdown in both the third and fourth quarters. First Weisenbaugh, and then Howard Gelini carried the ball across the goal line, while Matesic added one placement to finalize the score at 40 to 0. West Virginia finished the season with a 5–5 record.

Statistically, the Panthers dominated for the second week in a row. Offensively, Pitt earned 16 first downs and netted 419 yards. Defensively, they held West Virginia to 2 first downs and a net of 26 yards.

The Pitt starting lineup for the game against West Virginia was Theodore Daily (left end), Paul Cuba (left tackle), Charles Hartwig (left guard), George Shotwell (center), Tarciscio Onder (right guard), Robert Hoel (right tackle), Joseph Skladany (right end), Robert Hogan (quarterback), Warren Heller (left halfback), Mike Sebastian (right halfback) and Isadore Weinstock (fullback). Substitutes appearing in the game for Pitt were Louis Wojcihhovski, Harvey Rooker, John Meredith, John Love, Robert Timmons, Ken Ormiston, Marwood Stark, John Valenti, Joseph Tormey, Francis Seigel, Stanley Oleojnicsak, Frank Walton, Karl Seiffert, Roco Cutri, Miller Munjas, James Simms, Melvin Brown, Richard Matesic, Howard O'Dell, Henry Weisenbaugh and John Luch.

Scoring summary

Quarter	Time	Drive			Team	Scoring information	Score	
Quarter	Time	Plays	Yards	TOP	Team	Scoring information	Pittsburgh	West Virginia
1		4	76		Pittsburgh	Mike Sebastian 56-yard touchdown run, Isadore Weinstock kick good	7	0
1		1	33		Pittsburgh	Warren Heller 33-yard touchdown run, Weinstock kick no good	13	0
1		5	37		Pittsburgh	Weinstock 5-yard touchdown run, Weinstock kick good	20	0
2		3	31		Pittsburgh	Henry Weisenbaugh 9-yard touchdown run, Richard Matesic kick good	27	0
3		3	47		Pittsburgh	Weisenbaugh 2-yard touchdown run, Matesic kick good	34	0
4		7	33		Pittsburgh	Howard Gelini 5-yard touchdown run, Melvin Brown kick no good	40	0
"TOP" = time of possession. For other American football terms, see Glossary of American football.							40	0

=== Duquesne ===
Week 3: Duquesne at Pitt

Team	1	2	3	4	Total
Duquesne	0	0	0	0	0
• Pitt	13	0	7	13	33

- Date: October 8, 1932
- Location: Pitt Stadium
  Pittsburgh, PA
- Game start: 2:00 p.m.
- Game attendance: 30,000
- Game weather: warm and sunny
- Referee: W. G. Crowell (Swarthmore)

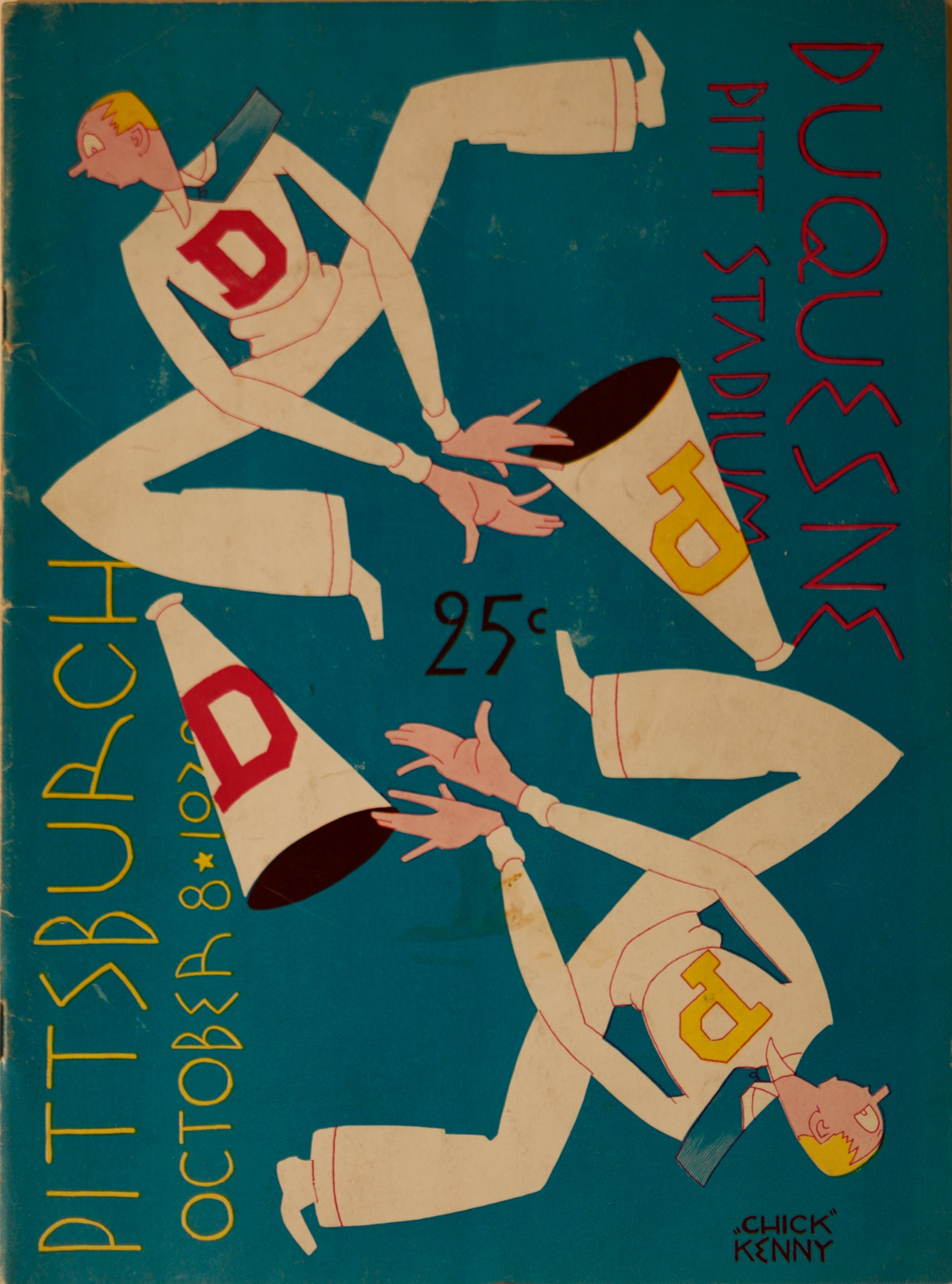
Program for October 8, 1932 game vs. Duquesne

On October 8 the Duquesne Dukes and Pitt Panthers met on the gridiron for the first time since 1901, when Duquesne was named Pittsburgh College. In 1927 Duquesne hired Elmer Layden, a member of Notre Dame's famous “Four Horsemen”, as head coach to upgrade their football program. After Layden led the Dukes to the Tri-State Conference title in 1928 and 1929, Duquesne became independent and upgraded their schedule. Layden's unbeaten team (3–0) came into this game with no injuries. The Dukes had outscored their opponents 49–0.

The Pitt News mused: "It seems hardly possible that Duquesne will defeat the Panthers, but Duquesne followers have not lost hope. Considering the affair from all angles, it appears that Pitt will likely be the first team to defeat the Dukes by more than twenty points, a feat that has not been accomplished since Layden took charge."

The Panthers were too strong for the Dukes, as they prevailed 33–0. Warren Heller led the offense with 2 short touchdown runs in the first quarter and Isadore Weinstock added an extra point. The second quarter was scoreless and Pitt led 13 to 0 at halftime. After Mike Sebastian raced 33 yards on a punt return to the Duquesne 6-yard line, he scored from the 3-yard line. Weinstock added the point for a 20 to 0 lead at the end of three periods. Substitute backs Mike Nicksick and Richard Matesic added two touchdowns in the final stanza and Matesic converted a point after to end the scoring. Pitt earned 18 first downs and gained 440 total yards. Duquesne had 6 first downs and 171 total yards. The Dukes were only able to complete 7 of 23 pass attempts, and the Panther defense had 4 interceptions.

Both coaches spoke with Les Biederman of The Pittsburgh Press. Coach Sutherland said: "If we hadn't got our share of the breaks, it might have been a much closer game. I had to get my players 'up there' for Duquesne. That's how much I thought of Elmer Layden's boys. The Dukes had plenty of heart." Coach Layden declared: "Those boys certainly charge as though they were the 'Light Brigade'...But I am certainly proud of my boys...They don't know the meaning of the word quit...It's no disgrace losing to Pitt this year. They're much better than last fall." Duquesne finished the season with a 7-2-1 record.

The Pitt starting lineup for the game against Duquesne was Theodore Daily (left end), Paul Cuba (left tackle), Charles Hartwig (left guard), Joseph Tormey (center), Tarciscio Onder (right guard), Robert Hoel (right tackle), Joe Skladany (right end), Robert Hogan (quarterback), Warren Heller (left halfback), Mike Sebastian (right halfback) and Isadore Weinstock (fullback). Substitutes appearing in the game for the Panthers were Louis Wojcihovski, Harvey Rooker, Frank Walton, John Love, Ken Ormiston, George Shotwell, John Valenti, Francis Seigel, John Meredith, Stanley Olejnicsak, Rocco Cutri, Miller Munjas, James Simms, Mike Nicksick, Howard O'Dell, Richard Matesic and Henry Weisenbaugh.

Scoring summary

Quarter	Time	Drive			Team	Scoring information	Score	
Quarter	Time	Plays	Yards	TOP	Team	Scoring information	Duquesne	Pittsburgh
1		5	66		Pittsburgh	Warren Heller 2-yard touchdown run, Isadore Weinstock kick good	0	7
1		12	77		Pittsburgh	Heller 1-yard touchdown run, Weinstock kick no good	0	13
3		2	6		Pittsburgh	Mike Sebastian 3-yard touchdown run, Weinstock kick good	0	20
4		14	80		Pittsburgh	Mike Nicksick 5-yard touchdown reception from Richard Matesic, Matesic kick good	0	27
4		4	47		Pittsburgh	Matesic 40-yard touchdown run, Nicksick kick no good	0	33
"TOP" = time of possession. For other American football terms, see Glossary of American football.							0	33

=== At Army ===
Week 4: Pitt at Army

Team	1	2	3	4	Total
• Pitt	6	6	6	0	18
Army	0	6	7	0	13

- Date: October 15, 1932
- Location: Michie Stadium
  West Point, NY
- Game start: 2:00 p.m.
- Game attendance: 20,000
- Game weather: sunny with a cool breeze
- Referee: E. J. O'Brien (Harvard)

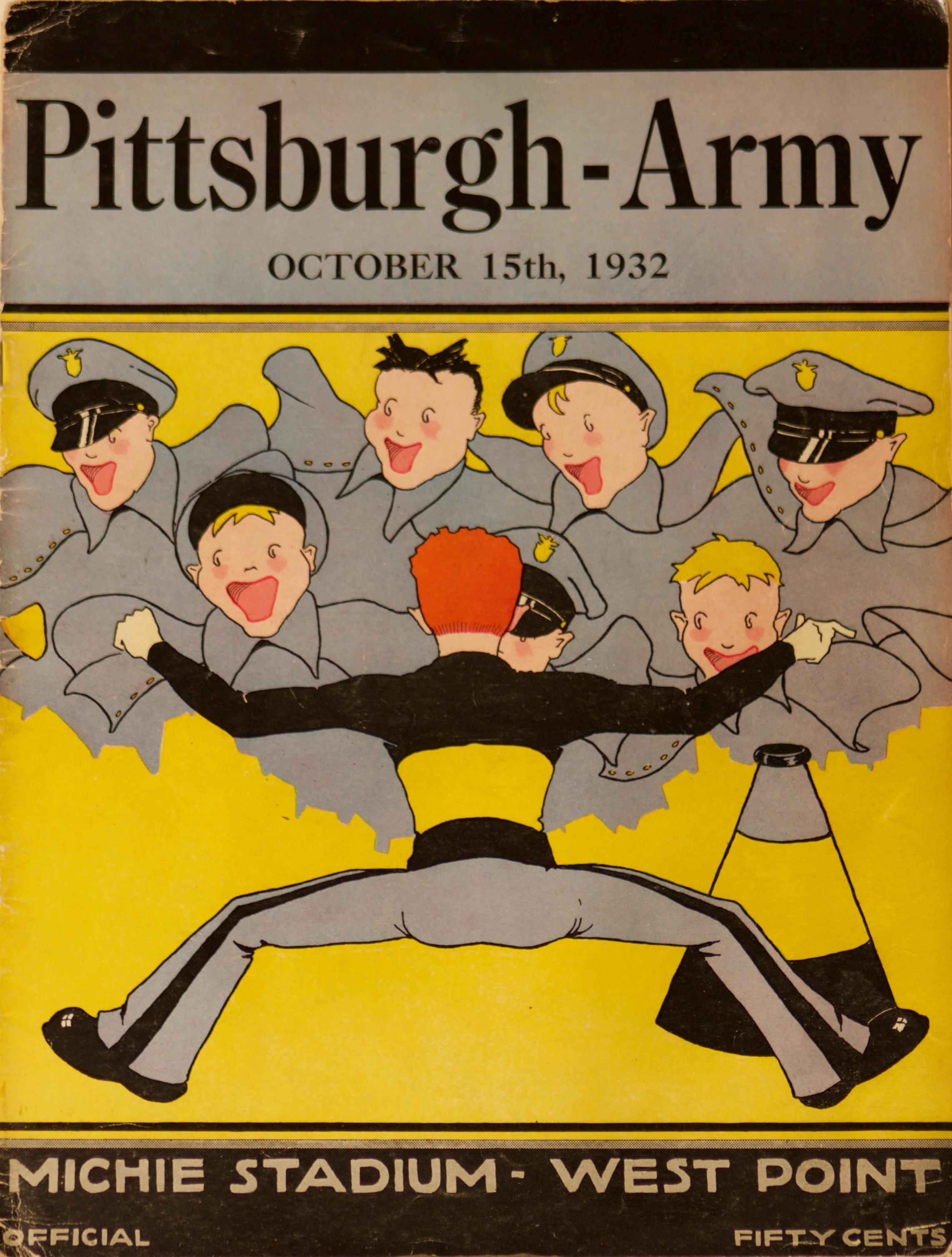
Program for October 15, 1932 game vs. Army

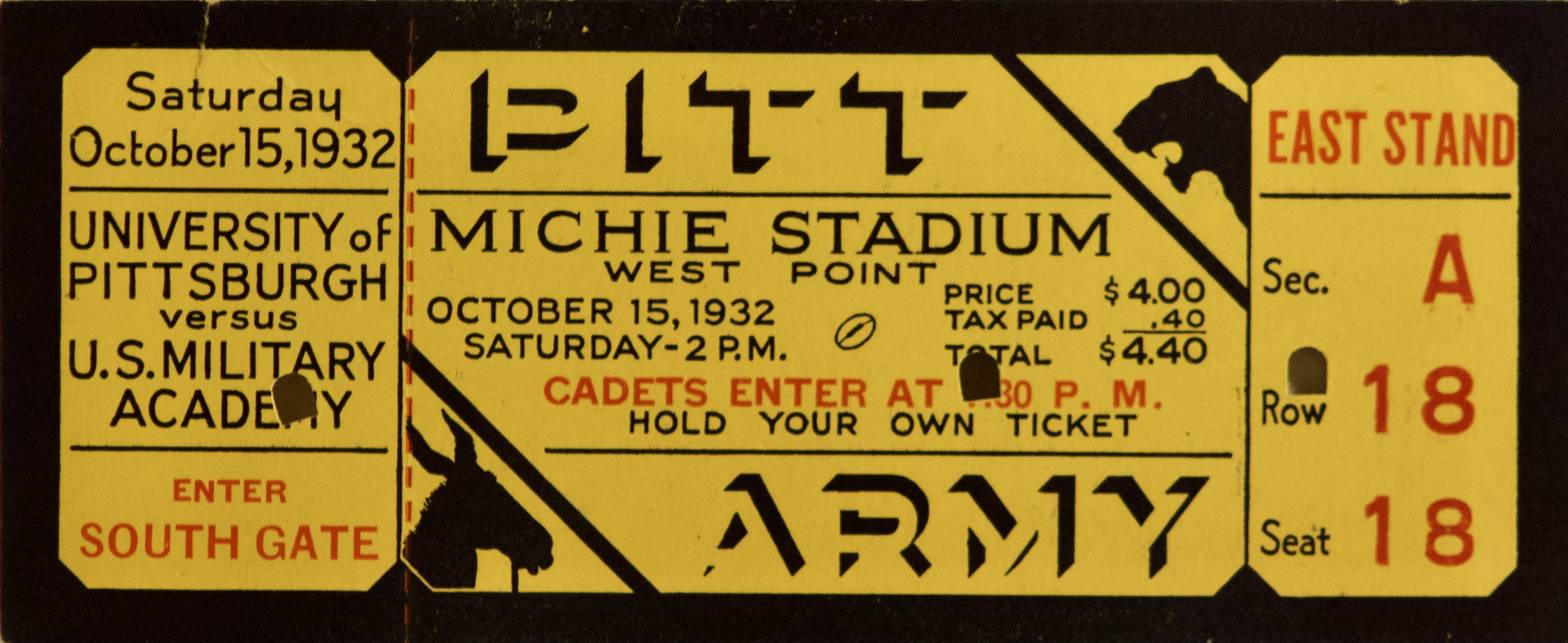
Ticket for October 15, 1932 Pitt vs. Army game

On October 15 Pitt and West Point met at Michie Stadium. Third-year Coach Ralph Sasse, who had led the Cadets to a 19–3–2 mark in two-plus campaigns, was retiring at the end of the season. The Cadets had revenge on their minds, after being drubbed 26 to 0 the previous year, and wanted a victory for their coach against a phenomenal Pitt club. Army opened their season with victories over Carleton and Furman. The Cadets had three All-Americans in their lineup – guard Milton Summerfelt, end Richard King and quarterback Felix Vidal. Last year's starting quarterback, Edward Herb, had a broken leg and was replaced by Vidal.

The Panthers had Captain Paul Reider back in the lineup at halfback, but George Shotwell replaced the injured Joseph Tormey at center. The Sun-Telegraph predicted that the Panthers would run a double wing-back offense, try more forward passes and use some trick plays to beat the Army.

The Panthers eked out a hard-fought 18–13 victory. Jess Carver of the Sun-Telegraph summarized: "The Panthers lived up to their rating as favorites, but to the Army, a team that played its heart out for a victory that barely eluded its grasp, must go the lion's share of the laurels. The Army outplayed Pitt today, and don't you forget it."

The Panthers opened the scoring late in the first period with a 55 yard scamper by Warren Heller. Isadore Weinstock's extra point attempt was blocked. The Panther offense regained possession and scored on a 29-yard pass from Heller to Joseph Skladany. Weinstock missed the point after, but Pitt led 12 to 0. The Army offense countered with an 8 play, 44 yard drive that ended with a 5 yard touchdown run by Thomas Kilday. Travis Brown missed the extra point and the halftime score was 12 to 6. The Cadets advanced the ball inside the Panther 5-yard line early in the third quarter, but the Pitt defense held. The Army offense regained possession on the Pitt 35-yard line. Kenneth Fields completed a 27-yard pass to Vidal. Vidal picked up 6 yards on first down and Fields scored on the next play. Charles Broshous place-kicked the extra point and Pitt trailed 12-13. The Panther offense responded with a 73-yard drive. Heller completed a 48 yard pass to Skladany from his own 27-yard line to the Army 25-yard line. Six plays later Weinstock scored from the one. He missed the point after, but Pitt was back in the lead 18–13. Pitt moved the ball to the Army 11-yard line in the final period, but lost possession on downs. The Cadet offense then advanced the ball into Pitt territory, but the Panther defense kept them out of the end zone. Army finished the season with an 8-2 record.

The Pitt starting lineup for the game against Army was Theodore Daily (left end), Paul Cuba (left tackle), Charles Hartwig (left guard), George Shotwell (center), Tarciscio Onder (right guard), Robert Hoel (right tackle), Joe Skladany (right end), Robert Hogan (quarterback), Warren Heller (left halfback ), Paul Reider (right halfback) and Isadore Weinstock (fullback). Substitutes appearing in the game for Pitt were Harvey Rooker, John Meredith, Ken Ormiston, John Valenti, Joseph Tormey, Frank Walton, Robert Timmons, Francis Seifert, Rocco Cutrti, Miller Munjas, Mike Nicksick, Mike Sebastian, Richard Matesic and Henry Weisenbaugh.

Scoring summary

Quarter	Time	Drive			Team	Scoring information	Score	
Quarter	Time	Plays	Yards	TOP	Team	Scoring information	Pittsburgh	Army
1		1	55		Pittsburgh	Warren Heller 55-yard touchdown run, Isadore Weinstock kick no good (blocked)	6	0
2		9	56		Pittsburgh	Joseph Skladany 29-yard touchdown reception from Heller, Weinstock kick no good	12	0
2		8	44		Army	Thomas Kilday 5-yard touchdown run, Travis Brown kick no good	12	6
3		3	35		Army	Kenneth Fields 1-yard touchdown run, Charles Broshous kick good	12	13
3		8	73		Pittsburgh	Weinstock 1-yard touchdown run, Weinstock kick no good	18	13
"TOP" = time of possession. For other American football terms, see Glossary of American football.							18	13

=== Ohio State ===
Week 5: Ohio State at Pitt

Team	1	2	3	4	Total
Ohio State	0	0	0	0	0
Pitt	0	0	0	0	0

- Date: October 22, 1932
- Location: Pitt Stadium
  Pittsburgh, PA
- Game start: 2:00 p.m.
- Game attendance: 30,000
- Referee: Dex W. Very (Penn State)

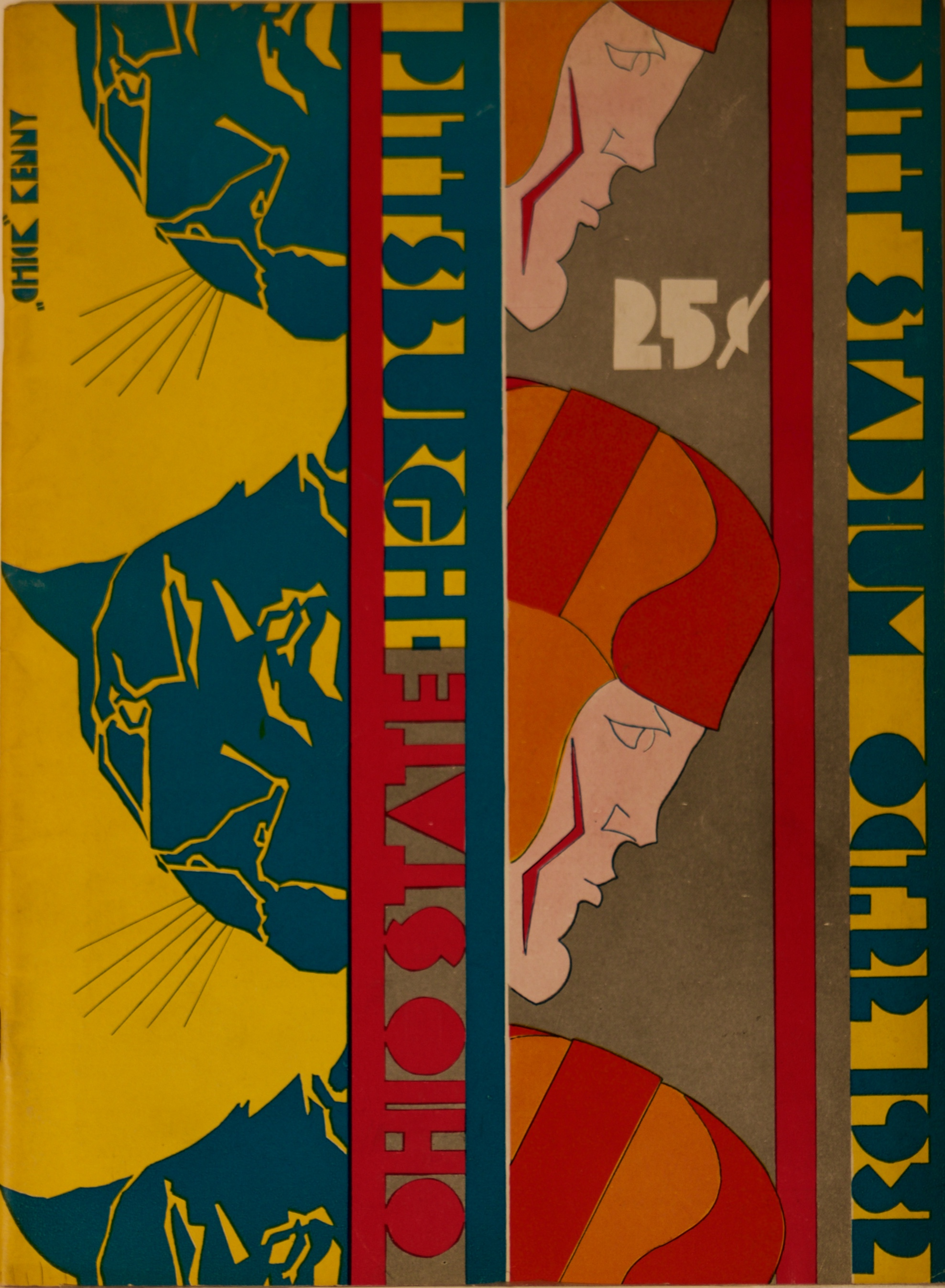
Program for October 22, 1932 game vs. Ohio State

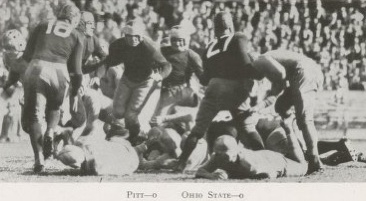
Action photo from October 22, 1932 Pitt vs. Ohio State game

The Homecoming match-up was against the Buckeyes of Ohio State. Fourth-year coach Sam Willaman's team was 1–1–1 on the season. The Buckeyes beat Ohio Wesleyan, tied Indiana and lost to Michigan. The Ohio State lineup boasted four All-Americans – end Sid Gilman, tackle Ted Rosequist, guard Joe Gailus and halfback Lew Hinchman. The Sun-Telegraph warned: "The Ohioans are due for a good game and Pitt for a letdown, and almost anything can happen this afternoon."

The Panthers and Buckeyes had played two times, with each team winning one game. The Panthers won at home 18–2 in 1929 and lost at Columbus 16–7 the following year. Coach Sutherland started the same line-up as in the Army game except for Frank Walton, who replaced Robert Hoel at right tackle.

The Cincinnati Enquirer summed it up best: "An underrated Ohio State football eleven refused to respect pregame predictions here today and fought the Pitt Panther to a standstill in its own lair, holding Jock Sutherland's highly touted team to a scoreless tie." The Panther offense spent the first half in Ohio territory but could not score. The Buckeyes threatened the Panther goal twice in the third stanza, but came up short each time. The Panthers made a valiant final offensive effort with three minutes remaining in the game. They gained possession on their 14-yard line. Warren Heller completed a 52 yard pass play to Mike Sebastian, who was tackled on the State 34-yard line. Sebastian raced 20 yards for another first down on the State 14-yard line. Buckeye end Sidney Gilman threw Sebastian for a 13 yard loss to the 27-yard line. Sebastian threw an incomplete pass to Theodore Daily in the end zone, but State halfback Thomas Keefe was called for interference, and Pitt had first down on the 1-yard line. Three futile line bucks and an incomplete pass turned the ball over to the Buckeyes. The game ended seconds later. David Finoli noted in When Pitt Ruled the Gridiron that Coach Willaman instructed his defense to repeatedly jump offsides when the ball was on the one yard line - "which at that point and time in college football history allowed the clock to run, giving Pitt little time to score. The Buckeye offside ploy proved to be successful, running the clock down as Sebastian failed to score on a third attempt, leaving Pitt with a fourth and inches and seconds left. They decided to pass; Sebastian thought he had completed the winning pass only to see it fall harmlessly to the ground." Ohio State finished the season with a 4-1-3 record.

The Pitt starting lineup for the Ohio State game was Theodore Dailey (left end), Paul Cuba (left tackle), Tarciscio Onder (left guard), George Shotwell (center), Charles Hartwig (right guard), Frank Walton (right tackle), Joseph Skladany (right end), Robert Hogan (quarterback), Warren Heller (left halfback), Mike Sebastian (right halfback) and Isadore Weinstock (fullback). Substitutes appearing in the game for Pitt were Harvey Rooker, Rocco Cutri, Joseph Tormey, John Valenti and Mike Sebastian.

=== Notre Dame ===
Week 6: Notre Dame at Pitt

Team	1	2	3	4	Total
Notre Dame	0	0	0	0	0
• Pitt	0	0	0	12	12

- Date: October 29, 1932
- Location: Pitt Stadium
  Pittsburgh, PA
- Game start: 2:00 p.m.
- Game attendance: 60,000
- Game weather: fair and cool
- Referee: W. T. Halloran (Providence)

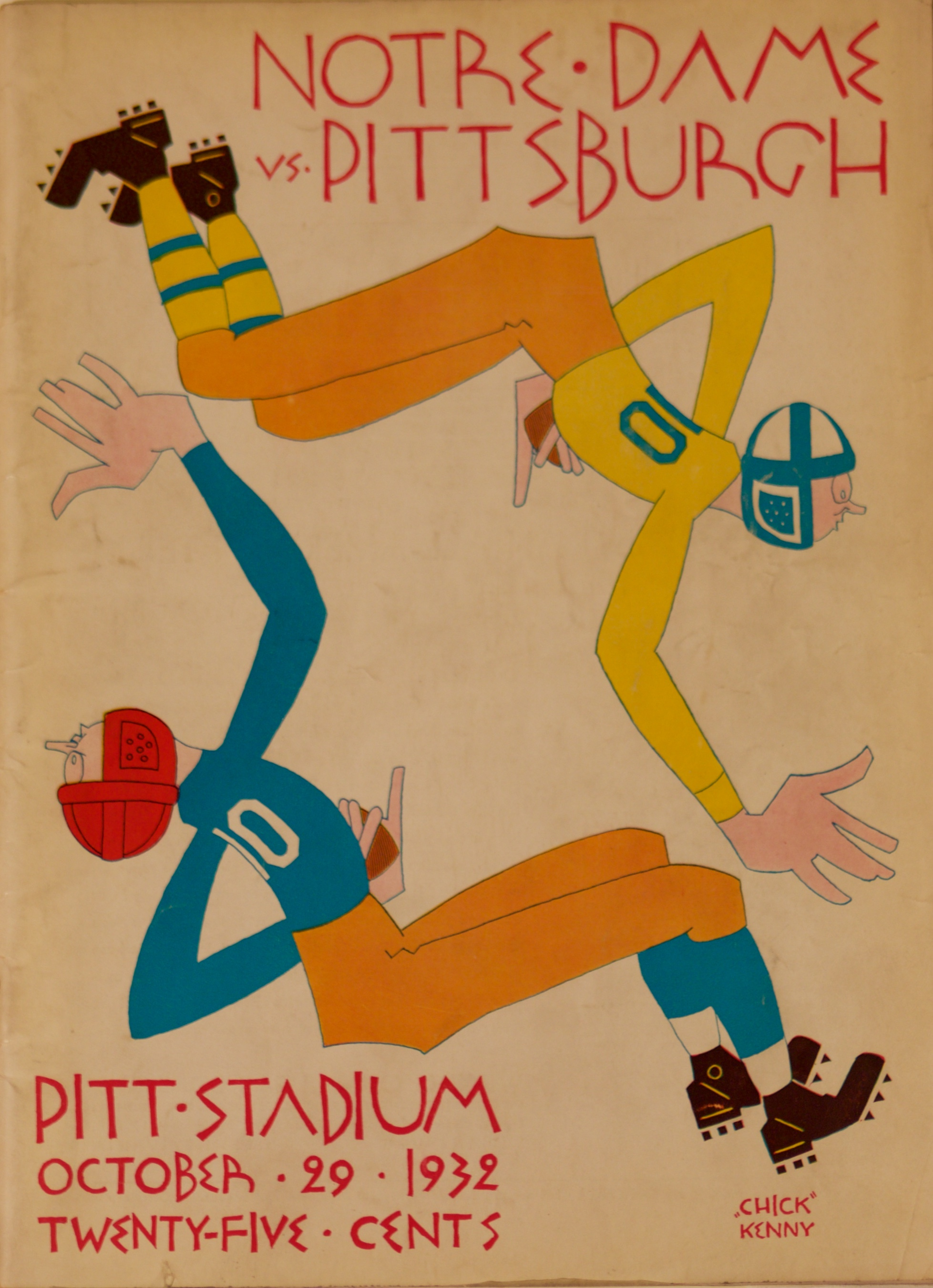
Program for October 29, 1932 game vs. Notre Dame

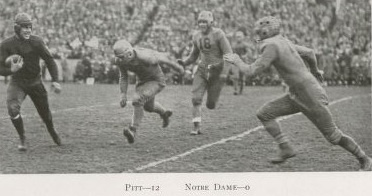
Photo from October 29, 1932 Pitt vs. Notre Dame game

On October 29 the Fighting Irish of Notre Dame, sporting a 3–0 record on the season and owning a 4–0–1 all-time record against the Panthers, arrived at Pitt Stadium as a 3 1/2 to 1 favorite. Coach Heartley Anderson brought 37 players east and opted to start his first string line and second string backfield. The Irish squad had five All-Americans – tackle Joe Kurth, end Edwin Kasky, tackle Edward “Moose” Krause, fullback George Melinkovich and guard James Harris.

Coach Anderson told The Pittsburgh Press: "I think we'll win alright, but I'm predicting no score...This is one game we're determined to win – we're pointed for it, realizing it will be one of the hardest tests we will have all fall."

Coach Sutherland adjusted his starting lineup - Joseph Tormey returned to the lineup at center; Miller Munjas started the game at quarterback for the injured Robert Hogan; and Mike Sebastian replaced Captain Paul Reider at right halfback. "This news has further strengthened the odds on the visitors." Earlier in the week Pitt halfback Mike Nicksick was declared ineligible due to scholastic problems.

Edward J. Neil wrote in The South Bend Tribune: "The panther, regal jungle cat, and football team alike, is most dangerous when wounded. Cornered, it bares its fangs for the last fight to the death. A mighty Notre Dame eleven, hailed the greatest in the land, found that out for the first time today as the Panthers of Pittsburgh, battered and groggy, lashed out, in a dying fourth quarter effort that stunned the green grenadiers from South Bend, sent them reeling down to a 12 to 0 defeat, and chalked on the pages of football history one of the greatest upsets of all times."

The Irish took the opening kick-off and advanced the ball to the Pitt 25-yard line. The Pitt defense stiffened and Notre Dame lost the ball on downs. In the second period, the Irish offense sustained a 50 yard drive to Pitt 19-yard line, but the Panthers held again and took the ball on downs. A 40 yard march in the third stanza put the Irish within 9 yards of the Panther goal. The Panther defense stopped the Irish a few feet short on fourth down, and Pitt quarterback Bob Hogan punted out of danger. In the final quarter the Irish sustained another 35 yard march, which was stopped when Hogan intercepted Mike Koken's pass on the Pitt 27-yard line. Pitt earned two first downs to the Notre Dame 45-yard line before Mike Sebastian broke free around left end for the first score of the game. Isadore Weinstock's extra point attempt was blocked and Pitt led 6 to 0. Notre Dame received the kick-off and on second down Irish back McGuff's pass was intercepted by Theodore Dailey, who raced 36 yards unmolested for the second touchdown in less than two minutes. Weinstock's kick was again blocked and the final score read 12 to 0. The Irish finished the season with a 7–2 record.

The Pitt starting lineup for the game against Notre Dame was Theodore Dailey (left end), Paul Cuba (left tackle), Charles Hartwig (left guard), Joseph Tormey (center), Tarciscio Onder (right guard), Frank Walton (right tackle), Joseph Skladany (right end), Miller Munjas (quarterback), Warren Heller (left halfback), Mike Sebastian (right halfback) and Isadore Weinstock (fullback). Substitutes appearing in the game for Pitt were John Meredith, Ken Ormiston, Robert Hoel, Robert Hogan, Paul Reider and Henry Weisenbaugh.

Scoring summary

Quarter	Time	Drive			Team	Scoring information	Score	
Quarter	Time	Plays	Yards	TOP	Team	Scoring information	Notre Dame	Pittsburgh
4		4	73		Pittsburgh	Mike Sebastian 46-yard touchdown run, Isadore Weinstock kick no good (blocked)	6	0
4		1	40		Pittsburgh	Interception returned 40 yards for touchdown by Ted Daily, Weinstock kick no good (blocked)	12	0
"TOP" = time of possession. For other American football terms, see Glossary of American football.							0	12

=== At Penn ===
Week 7: Pitt at Penn

Team	1	2	3	4	Total
• Pitt	0	7	6	6	19
Penn	0	6	0	6	12

- Date: November 5, 1932
- Location: Franklin Field
  Philadelphia, PA
- Game start: 2:00 p.m.
- Game attendance: 70,000
- Game weather: warm
- Referee: E. J. O'Brien (Tufts)

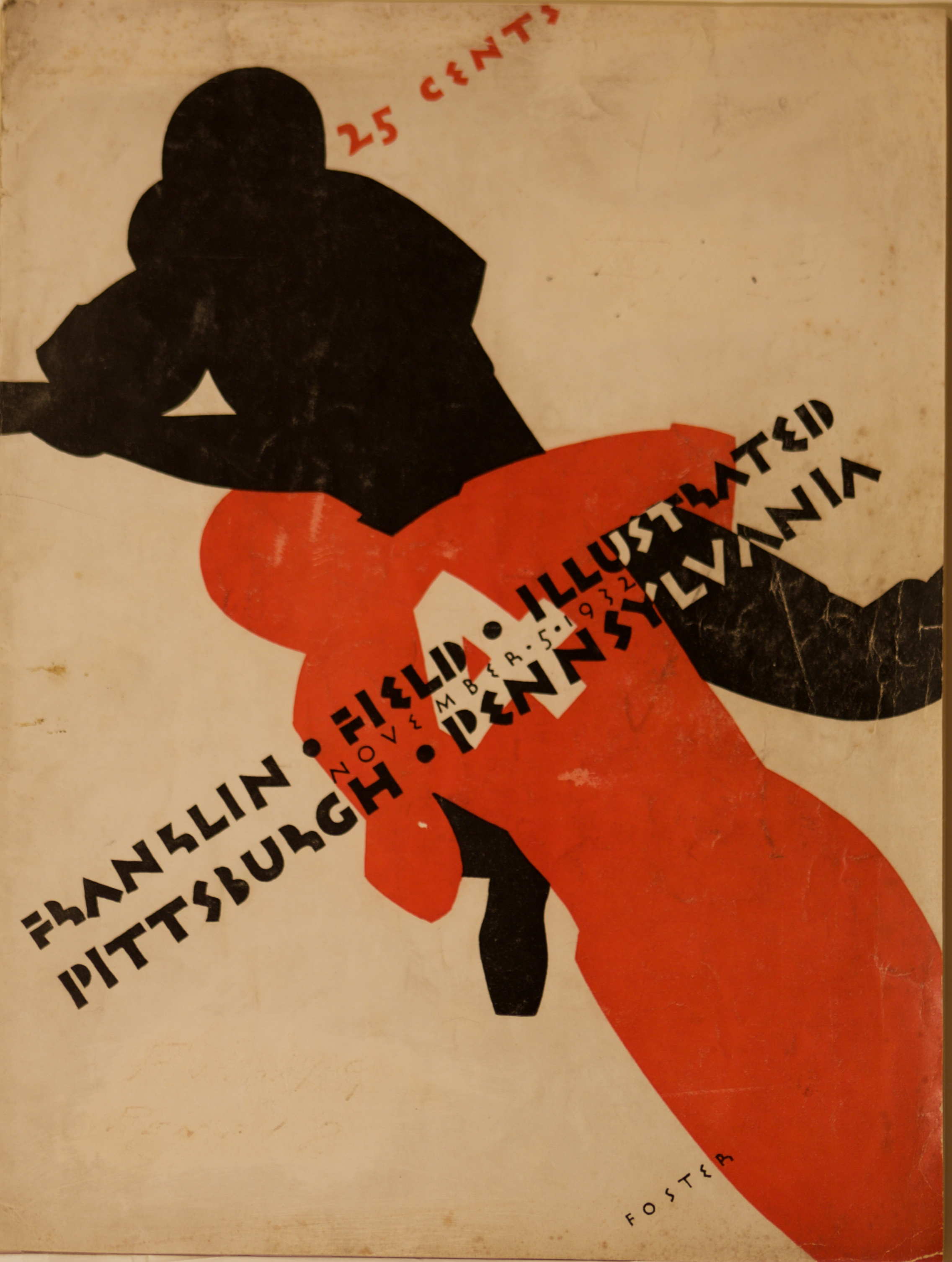
Program for November 5, 1932 game vs. Penn

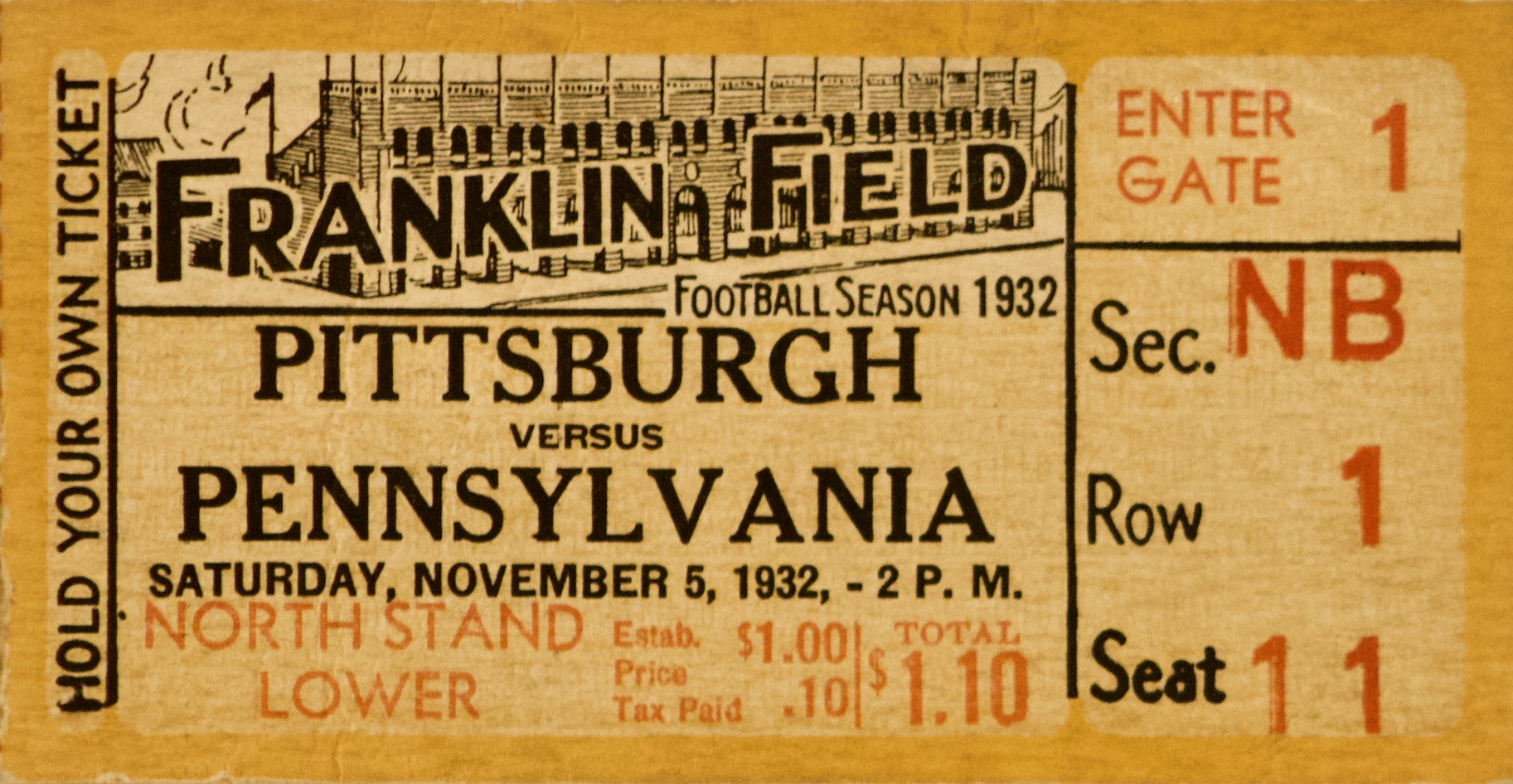
Ticket stub for November 5, 1932 Penn vs. Pitt game

Pitt's third road trip was across the state to Philadelphia to play the undefeated Penn Quakers. Penn, with a record of 5–0, had outscored their opposition 153 to 13. The schools last met in 1925, and the Panthers led the all-time series 8-1-1. Second-year Penn coach Harvey Harman played tackle on the Pitt teams of 1919-1921, and his line coach, Alec Fox, played guard for Coach Sutherland in 1927 and 1928. Penn was injury-free after their previous game against Navy, so Harman used the same starting lineup against the Panthers. The Quaker line was anchored by All-America tackle Howard Colehower.

The Panthers arrived in Philadelphia on Friday morning and were housed at the Merchant's Country Club at Oreland. Sutherland held a scrimmage on the grounds Friday afternoon. They traveled to Franklin Field Saturday right before game time. The Panthers were in the best shape of the season, but were still without their injured Captain, Paul Reider. Mike Nicksick regained his eligibility and was back on the team. Coach Sutherland used the same starting lineup as the Notre Dame game, except Bob Hogan who replaced Miller Munjas at quarterback.

It was historically significant that The Pittsburgh Press published driving directions from Pittsburgh to Franklin Field: "Motorists planning to drive to Philadelphia to see the Pitt-Penn football game tomorrow were advised today by the Pittsburgh Motor Club to use Route 30, the Lincoln Highway. Route 22, the William Penn Highway, has two detours. The trip is 294 miles over highways that are reported in good condition. To reach Franklin Field in Philadelphia drivers should continue on the Lincoln Highway, which becomes Lancaster Avenue, to the intersection of Chestnut Street. Franklin Field is one block South of that intersection."

Perry Lewis of The Philadelphia Inquirer reported: "Penn is no longer an undefeated team. Treading on the heels of Notre Dame, the Quakers yesterday joined the lengthening procession of distinguished elevens that have been crushed beneath Pitt's 1932 gridiron juggernaut. The score was 19 to 12–three touchdowns to two...In the neighborhood of 70,000 worshippers at the shrine of King Football framed the emerald arena where the mightiest gridiron gladiators of the Keystone State battled to a finish in one of the most savagely fought imbroglios these arch football rivals have ever waged."

Early in the second period the Panther offense ended a 67 yard, thirteen play drive on a fourth down, with Warren Heller scoring from four yards out. Isadore Weinstock's placement was perfect and Pitt led 7 to 0. Penn countered after blocking a Pitt punt attempt from the end zone. The ball was recovered by Pitt on their 10-yard line and Penn took possession. After a 4 yard loss on first down, Penn halfback, Don Kellett, completed a 14 yard touchdown pass to end John Powell. Monroe Smith missed the point after and Pitt led 7–6 at halftime. Coach Sutherland was unhappy and, after the break, started the second string. Henry Weisenbaugh intercepted an errant Penn pass on the Pitt 40-yard line and raced 47 yards to the Penn 13-yard line. Four plays later Weisenbaugh bulled his way into the end zone and Pitt led 13 to 6. Joe Matesic missed the point after. In the final period Pitt gained possession on their 20-yard line. Runs by Heller, Mike Sebastian and Weisenbaugh moved the ball to the Penn 11-yard line. After a penalty and 6 yard loss, Heller threw a 30 yard pass to Sebastian for Pitt's final touchdown. Weinstock failed to convert the extra point and Pitt led 19–6. Penn countered with a Kellett 57 yard punt return for a touchdown. Late in the game Pitt back John Luch fumbled a punt and Penn recovered the ball on the Pitt 15-yard line. Kellett's pass to the end zone was incomplete and the Panthers went back to Pittsburgh victorious. Penn finished the season with a 7–2 record.

The statistics were deceiving - Pitt earned 13 first downs to the Quakers 5; Pitt gained 354 yards and Penn 132; Pitt lost 2 fumbles and Penn 1; Each team intercepted 3 passes; Pitt was penalized 95 yards and Penn 55 yards.

The Pitt starting lineup for the game against Penn was Theodore Dailey (left end), Paul Cuba (left tackle), Charles Hartwig (left guard), Joseph Tormey (center), Tarciscio Onder (right guard), Frank Walton (right tackle), Joseph Skladany (right end), Bob Hogan (quarterback), Warren Heller (left halfback), Mike Sebastian (right halfback) and Isadore Weinstock (fullback). Substitutes appearing in the game for Pitt were Harvey Rooker, John Meredith, Ken Ormiston, Frank Kutz, George Shotwell, Francis Seigel, Robert Hoel, Robert Timmons, Miller Munjas, Howard O'Dell, James Simms, Henry Weisenbaugh and John Luch.

Scoring summary

Quarter	Time	Drive			Team	Scoring information	Score	
Quarter	Time	Plays	Yards	TOP	Team	Scoring information	Pittsburgh	Pennsylvania
2		13	67		Pittsburgh	Warren Heller 4-yard touchdown run, Isadore Weinstock kick good	7	0
2		2	10		Pennsylvania	John Powell 14-yard touchdown reception from Don Kellett, Monroe Smith kick no good	7	6
3		4	13		Pittsburgh	Henry Weisenbaugh 4-yard touchdown run, Joseph Matesic kick no good	13	6
4		9	80		Pittsburgh	Mike Sebastian 14-yard touchdown reception from Heller, Weinstock kick no good	19	6
4		1	57		Pennsylvania	Punt returned 57 yards for touchdown by Kellett, Kellett kick no good	19	12
"TOP" = time of possession. For other American football terms, see Glossary of American football.							19	12

=== At Nebraska ===
Week 8: Pitt at Nebraska

Team	1	2	3	4	Total
Pitt	0	0	0	0	0
Nebraska	0	0	0	0	0

- Date: November 12, 1932
- Location: Memorial Stadium
  Lincoln, NE
- Game start: 2:00 p.m.
- Game attendance: 24,720
- Game weather: snow, ice and wind
- Referee: Les Edmonds (Ottawa)

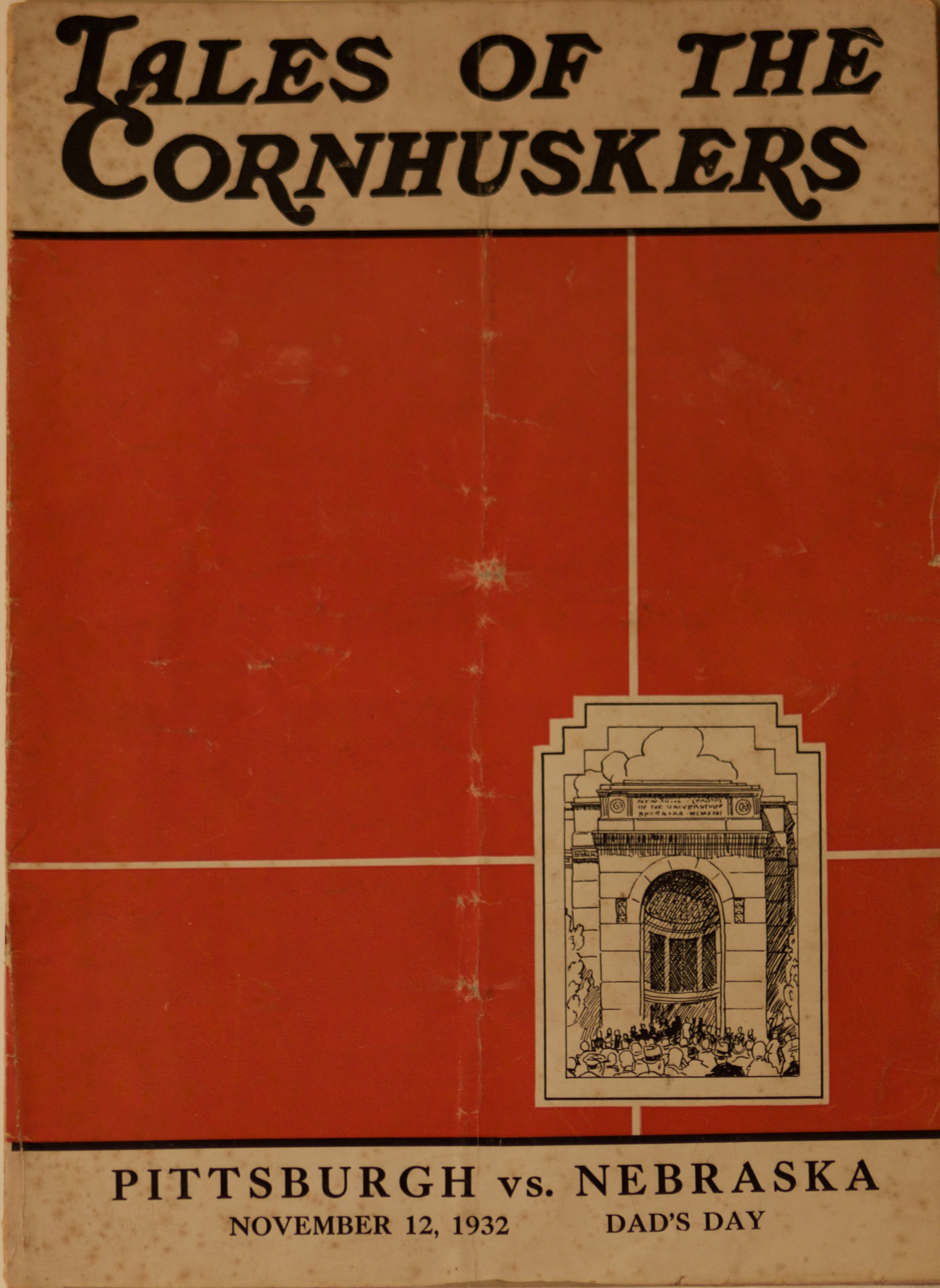
Program for November 12, 1932 game vs. Nebraska

The Panthers' train delivered the squad home from Philadelphia on Sunday morning. On Wednesday night 38 Panthers (largest Pitt traveling squad to that time) reboarded at Penn Station for the western trip to play the Nebraska Cornhuskers in Lincoln, NE. On Thursday the team had a 12-hour layover in Chicago and worked out at Stagg Field. Friday was spent in Omaha, NE with a workout at Ak-Sar-Ben (Nebraska spelled backward) Pavilion. The team departed for Memorial Stadium on Saturday morning.

The Panthers led the all-time series 3–1–2. This was the Pitt's fourth trip to Lincoln and two of the previous visits ended in scoreless ties.

Coach Sutherland started his second string to give the varsity some rest. But, according to the Sun-Telegraph: "The varsity will be ready for instantaneous relief duty."

Fourth-year coach Dana X. Bible's Cornhuskers were 4–1. Their only blemish was a one point loss to Minnesota. The Lincoln Star noted: "A win would be unusually sweet in view of the 40–0 rampage the Pittsburghers staged at Cornhusker expense on the Smoky City gridiron last Thanksgiving day....With the squad 100 per cent physical condition for the first time since the start of the season, the Scarlet and Cream is prepared to meet the Panthers in a give-and-take affair."

John Bentley of The Lincoln Star reported: "Nebraska and Pittsburgh, the team that beat Notre Dame, fought a scoreless tie at the stadium Saturday afternoon as 27,000 spectators watched one of the toughest toe-to-toe gridiron battles that has ever been fought here...Nebraska outplayed the Panthers from first to last...Nebraska outdowned the Panthers 13 to 7, outrushed what has been termed the greatest backfield in America, 283 yards to 183 and in net yards gained, which includes passes had the edge of 277 yards to 198."

Both defenses were the deciding factor in the frigid conditions. In the third quarter the Pitt offense advanced the ball 64 yards to the Husker 11-yard line and lost the ball on downs. In the fourth period Pitt moved the ball to the Nebraska 26-yard line. Husker quarterback Bernie Masterson stopped the drive by intercepting a Warren Heller pass. The Pitt defense had to thwart three Husker drives. In the second quarter the Husker offense was on the Pitt 3-yard line, when Heller broke up a pass play on fourth down in the end zone. Early in the fourth quarter the Huskers advanced to the Pitt 27-yard line and lost the ball on downs. Later, they advanced to the Pitt 19-yard line and the Pitt defense stiffened. Masterson attempted a field goal from the 30-yard line that was short, and Pitt escaped with a scoreless tie. The Huskers won the Big Six Conference title and finished the season with a 7–1–1 record.

The Pitt starting lineup for the game against Nebraska was Harvey Rooker (left end), John Meredith (left tackle), Ken Ormiston (left guard), George Shotwell (center), Francis Siegel (right guard), Robert Hoel (right tackle), Robert Timmons (right end), Miller Munjas (quarterback), Howard O'Dell (left halfback), Paul Reider (right halfback) and Henry Weisenbaugh (fullback). Substitutes appearing in the game for Pitt were Paul Cuba, Charles Hartwig, Joseph Tormey, Tarciscio Onder, Frank Walton, Joseph Skladany, Robert Hogan, Warren Heller, Mike Sebastian and Isadore Weinstock.

=== Carnegie Tech ===
Week 9: Carnegie Tech at Pitt

Team	1	2	3	4	Total
Carnegie Tech	0	0	0	0	0
• Pitt	0	0	6	0	6

- Date: November 19, 1932
- Location: Pitt Stadium
  Pittsburgh, PA
- Game start: 2:00 p.m.
- Game attendance: 15,000
- Game weather: rain, snow, cold
- Referee: Ed Thorpe (De LaSalle)

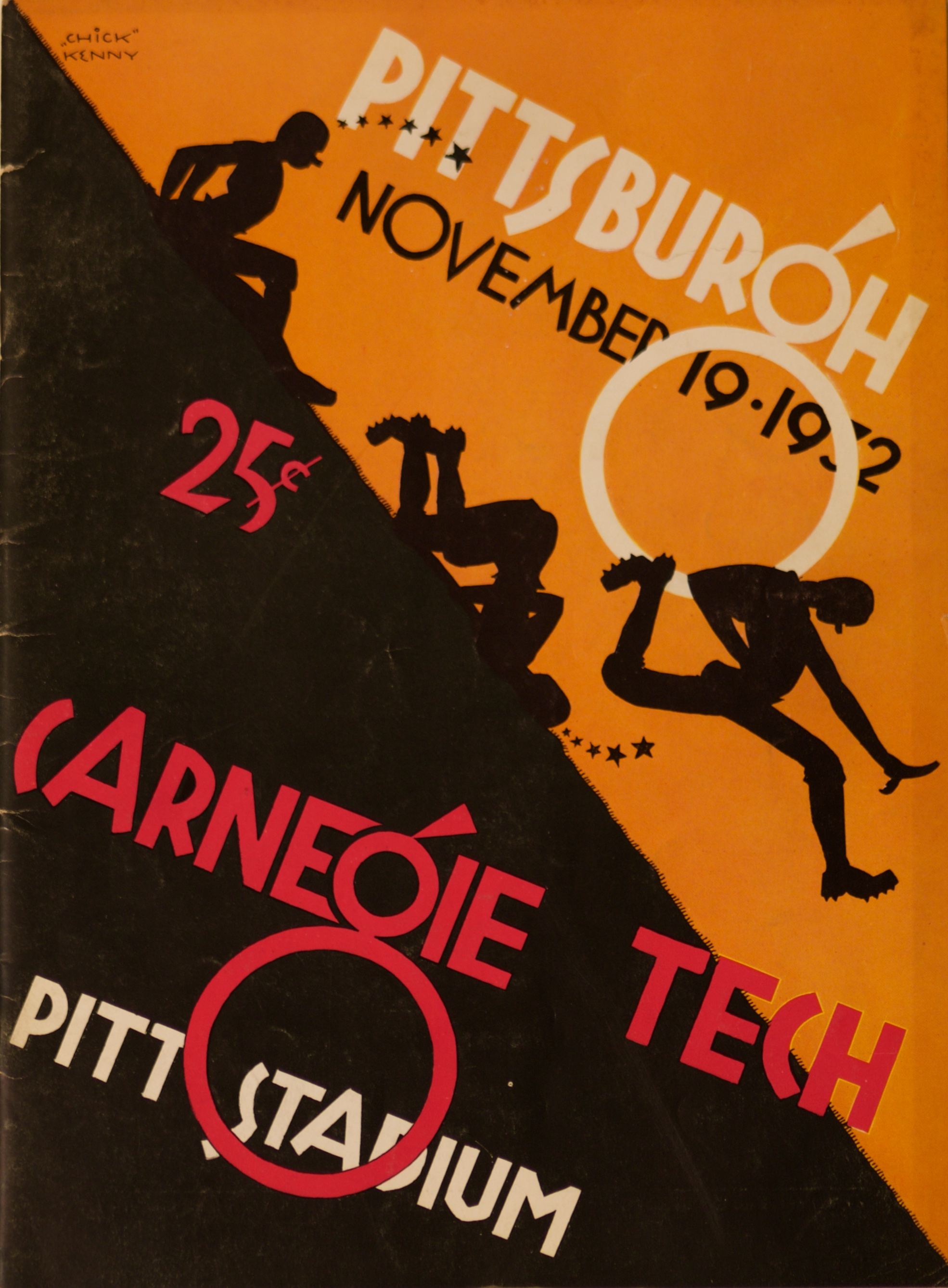
Program for November 19, 1932 game vs. Carnegie Tech

On November 19 the nineteenth edition of the "City Game" was held at Pitt Stadium. Three trophies – the City of Pittsburgh, the Chamber of Commerce and the Warner Brothers awards - were presented to the victor. It was Homecoming Day at Carnegie Tech. The Skibos hoped the bonfire, pep rally and visiting grads would help the team upset the Panthers. The Tartans were 3–1–2 on the season for coach Walter Steffen, who was in his 18th year at Tech. Tech's lone loss was against Notre Dame ( 42 to 0). Star halfback, Bill Spisak, was injured in the previous game against Xavier and was replaced by Tech track star Tom Coulter.

Pitt led the all-time series 14–4, but Tech had won four of the past nine games. Theodore Dailey, left end, and Paul Reider, right halfback, were healthy and back in the starting lineup. John Meredith replaced Paul Cuba at left tackle and Miller Munjas replaced Bob Hogan at quarterback. Coach Sutherland was worried his team was taking the Tartans too lightly, because his present squad had never lost to Tech.

For the second game in a row the Panthers played in terrible weather. Harry Keck of the Sun-Telegraph described: "All through the night and right up to a little before game time, the rain had poured down. And when the rain ended, it snowed until after they got the rain cover off the gridiron and everything had been rendered nice and gooey. And then, the weather gods just sat back and hee-hawed themselves silly as the teams mud-horsed it up and down the field through four dragging periods to a 6–0 victory for Pitt."

Despite the adverse weather conditions, both defensive units and punters kept the offenses from sustaining any drives. Even though Pitt earned 11 first downs to Tech's 3; out gained the Tartans 214 yards from scrimmage to 76; intercepted 3 passes and out punted the Techsters by 10 yards per punt, the Panthers needed a fumble recovery deep in Carnegie territory to score. Late in the third period Pitt quarterback Miller Munjas punted. Tech quarterback Stuart Dueger fumbled, and Pitt end Harvey Rooker recovered on the Carnegie 4-yard line. On fourth down Isadore Weinstock plunged into the end zone for the only score of the game. His extra point attempt was blocked and Pitt survived 6 to 0, and kept their undefeated season intact.

Carnegie Tech finished the season with a 4–3–2 record. Walter Steffen resigned with an 18-year record of 88-53-8. He was 4–10 versus Pitt.

The Pitt starting lineup for the game against Carnegie Tech was Ted Dailey (left end), John Meredith (left tackle), Charles Hartwig (left guard), Joseph Tormey (center), Tarciscio Onder (right guard), Frank Walton (right tackle), Joseph Skladany (right end), Miller Munjas (quarterback), Warren Heller(left halfback), Paul Reider (right halfback) and Isadore Weinstock (fullback). Substitutes appearing in the game for Pitt were Harvey Rooker, Paul Cuba, George Shotwell, Robert Hogan, Mike Sebastian, Howard O'Dell and Henry Weisenbaugh.

Scoring summary

Quarter	Time	Drive			Team	Scoring information	Score	
Quarter	Time	Plays	Yards	TOP	Team	Scoring information	Carnegie Tech	Pittsburgh
3		4	4		Pittsburgh	Isadore Weinstock 1-yard touchdown run, Weinstock kick no good (blocked)	0	6
"TOP" = time of possession. For other American football terms, see Glossary of American football.							0	6

=== Stanford ===
Week 10: Stanford at Pitt

Team	1	2	3	4	Total
Stanford	0	0	0	0	0
• Pitt	7	0	0	0	7

- Date: November 26, 1932
- Location: Pitt Stadium
  Pittsburgh, PA
- Game start: 2:00 p.m.
- Game attendance: 35,000
- Game weather: sunny and cold
- Referee: E. C. Taggart (Rochester)

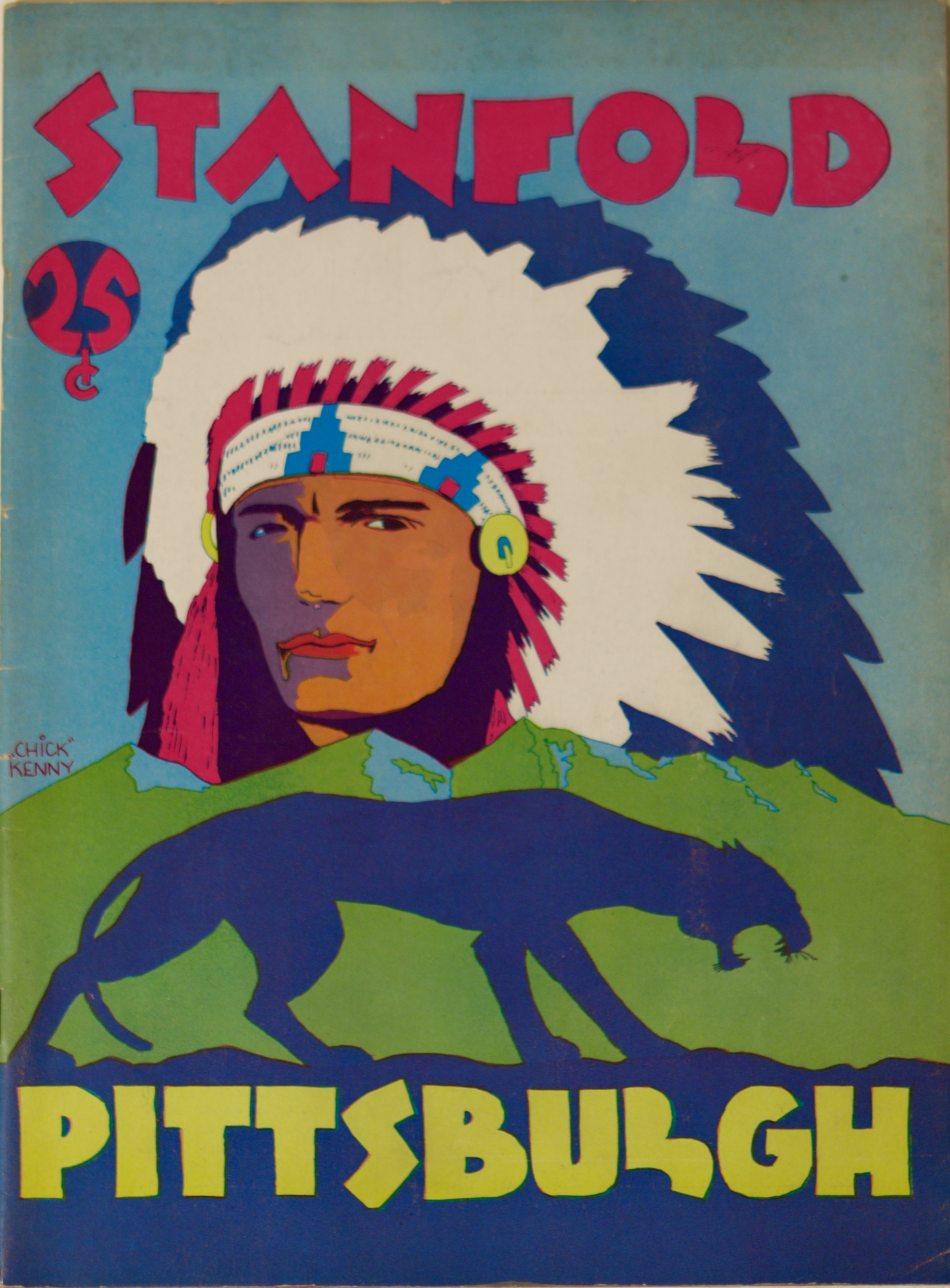
Program for November 26, 1932 game vs. Stanford

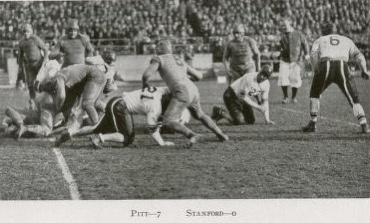
Photo from November 26, 1932 Pitt vs. Stanford game

On November 26 Glen Warner brought his Stanford Indians east to attempt to stymie Pitt's championship aspirations. Since taking the job at Stanford in 1924, Warner's eleven won three Pacific Coast Conference titles (1924, 1926, 1927), went to the Rose Bowl Game three times (1925, 1927, 1928) and won a national title (1926). His present team came to Pitt Stadium with a 6–3–1 overall record and a 1–3–1 record in the Pacific Coast Conference. Consensus All-American guard Bill Corbus anchored the Stanford line.

Pitt was 1–1 all-time against Stanford. In 1922 the Warner-led Panthers beat Stanford 16 to 7, and in the 1928 Rose Bowl the Warner-led Indians bested the Panthers 7 to 6. With an invitation to the Rose Bowl and possible national title on the line, the Panthers had to beat a team that had not lost to an eastern squad during Warner's tenure. Harry G. Scott noted in his book Jock Sutherland, Architect of Men: "In all fairness, it must be stated that his (Warner's) 1932 team did not measure up to his famous teams of the two preceding years which came east to slaughter Army and Dartmouth."

Since both Captain Paul Reider and his backup Mike Sebastian were injured, coach Sutherland started Richard Matesic at right halfback. Otherwise, the Panthers were healthy. Eleven seniors played in their last home game: Paul Reider, Warren Heller, Ted Dailey, Joe Tormey, Paul Cuba, John Luch, Francis Seigel, Mel Brown, Art Sekay Rocco Cutri and George Shindehuette.

The Pitt Panthers finished the season undefeated by shutting out the Stanford eleven 7 to 0. Early in the first period Pitt quarterback Bob Hogan punted from his own 37-yard line and Ted Dailey downed the ball on the Stanford 1-yard line. Stanford tried to punt out of danger, but their attempt into the strong wind was downed on their 30-yard line. Mike Sebastian gained eight yards around end. Isadore Weinstock added nine through the middle. Warren Heller completed a pass to Dailey for first down on the Stanford 2-yard line. On third down Heller pushed through for the score. Weinstock split the uprights for the extra point and Pitt led 7 to 0. Hogan's punts and the Pitt defense kept the Stanford offense deep in their own territory for three plus quarters. In the fourth quarter Stanford faked a punt and managed their initial first down. Two completed passes advanced the Indians to the Panther 25-yard line. The Panther defense stiffened, and Stanford had to punt. The score was not indicative of how well Pitt dominated play. The Panthers gained 211 yards from scrimmage to 44 for Stanford. Pitt earned 11 first downs to 3 for the Indians. The Panthers ran 68 plays to 26 for Stanford. In what turned out to be Pop Warner's final season as coach of Stanford, his team finished with a 6–4–1 record.

The Pitt starting lineup for the game against Stanford was Ted Dailey (left end), Paul Cuba (left Tackle), Charles Hartwig (left guard), Joseph Tormey (center), Tarciscio Onder (right guard), Frank Walton (right tackle), Joseph Skladany (right end), Robert Hogan (quarterback), Warren Heller (left halfback), Richard Matesic (right halfback) and Isadore Weinstock (fullback). Substitutes appearing in the game for Pitt were Harvey Rooker, Miller Munjas, Mike Sebastian and Henry Weisenbaugh.

Scoring summary

Quarter	Time	Drive			Team	Scoring information	Score	
Quarter	Time	Plays	Yards	TOP	Team	Scoring information	Stanford	Pittsburgh
1		9	30		Pittsburgh	Warren Heller 1-yard touchdown run, Isadore Weinstock kick good	0	7
"TOP" = time of possession. For other American football terms, see Glossary of American football.							0	7

=== Vs. USC (Rose Bowl) ===
Week 11: Pitt at USC

Team	1	2	3	4	Total
Pitt	0	0	0-	0	0
• USC	7	0	7	21	35

- Date: January 2, 1933
- Location: Rose Bowl
  Pasadena, CA
- Game start: 2:15 p.m.
- Game attendance: 83,000
- Game weather: warm
- Referee: Herb Dana (Nebraska)

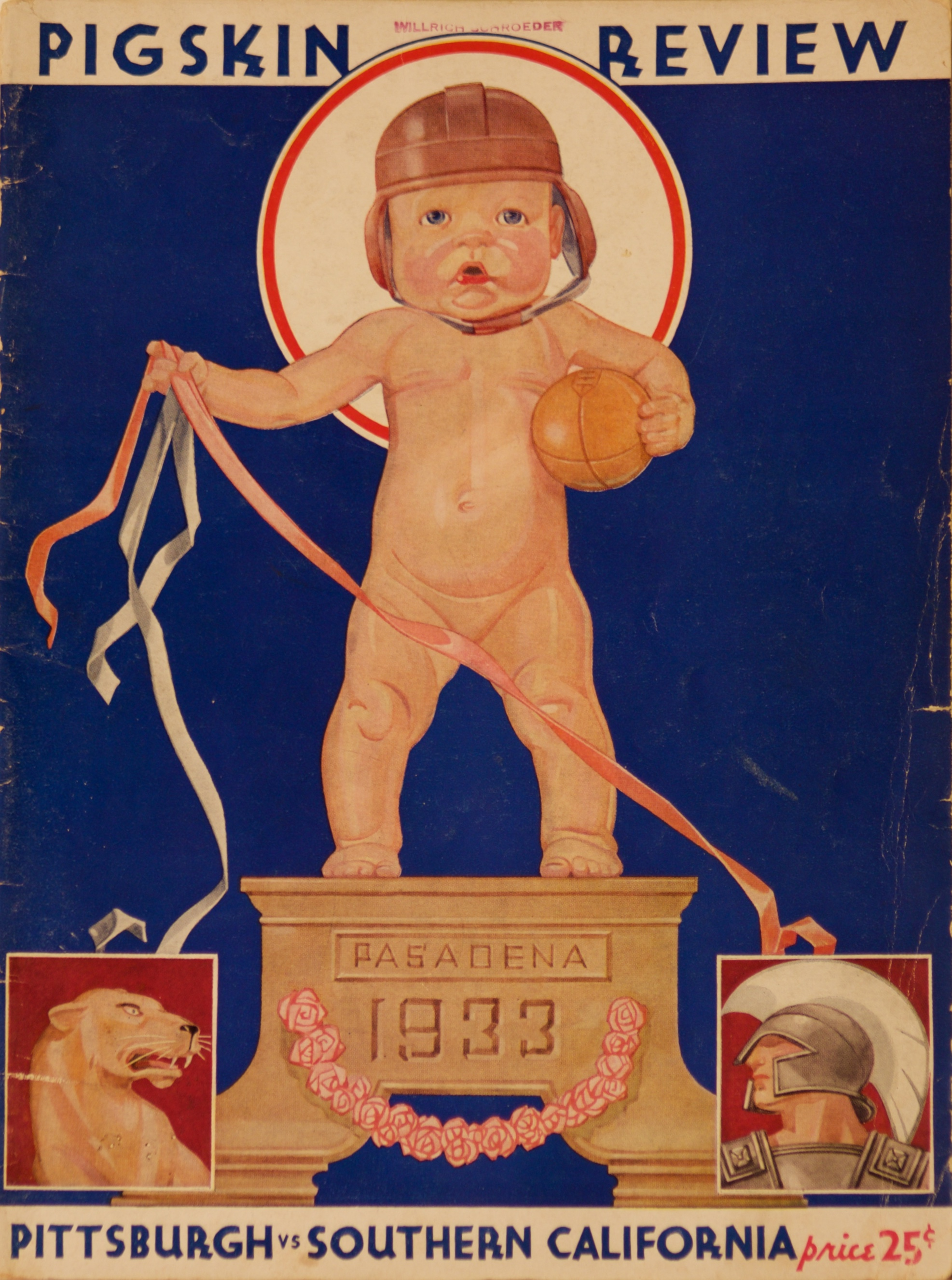
Official 1933 Rose Bowl Program

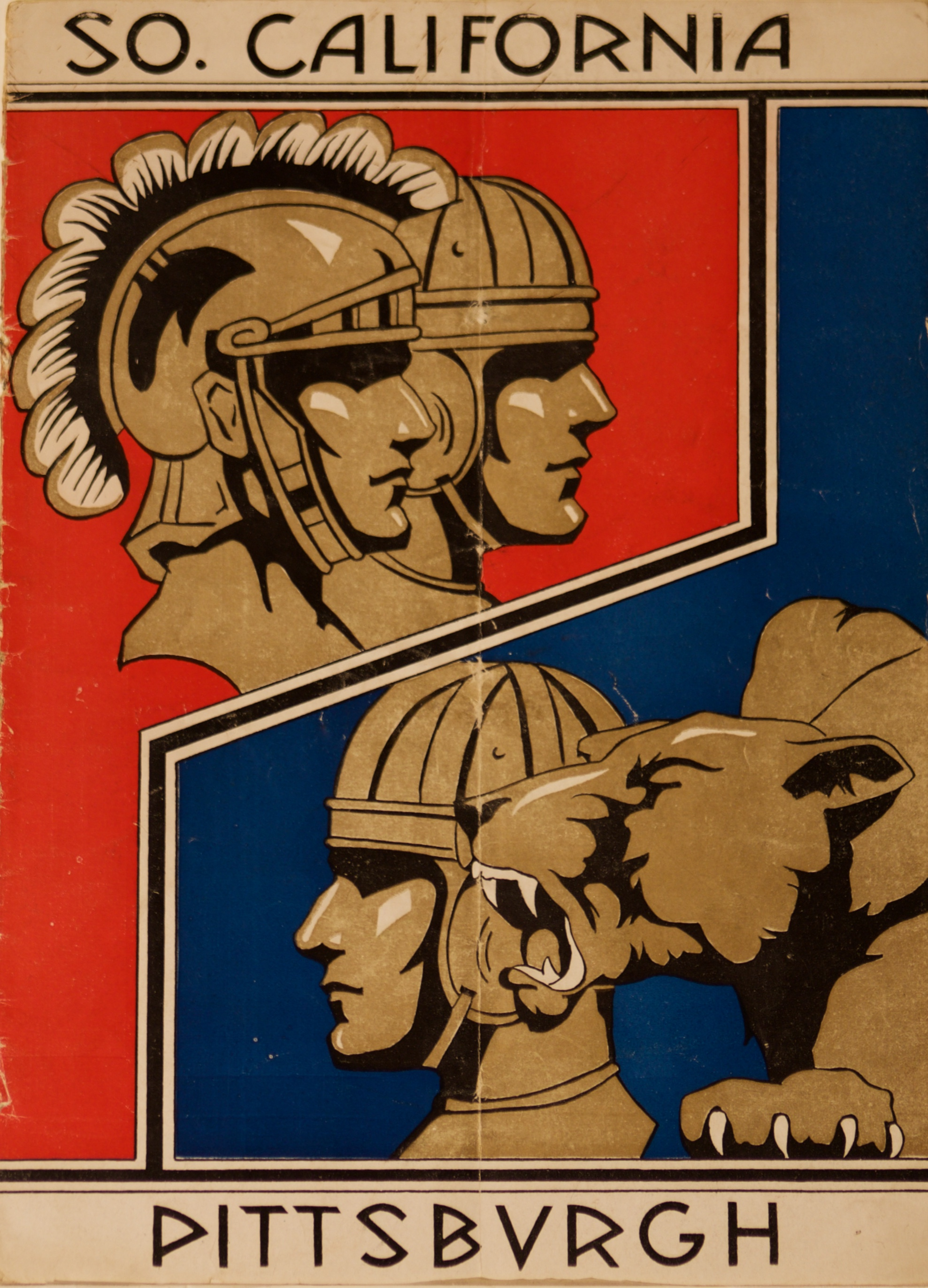
"Outlaw" 1933 Rose Bowl program

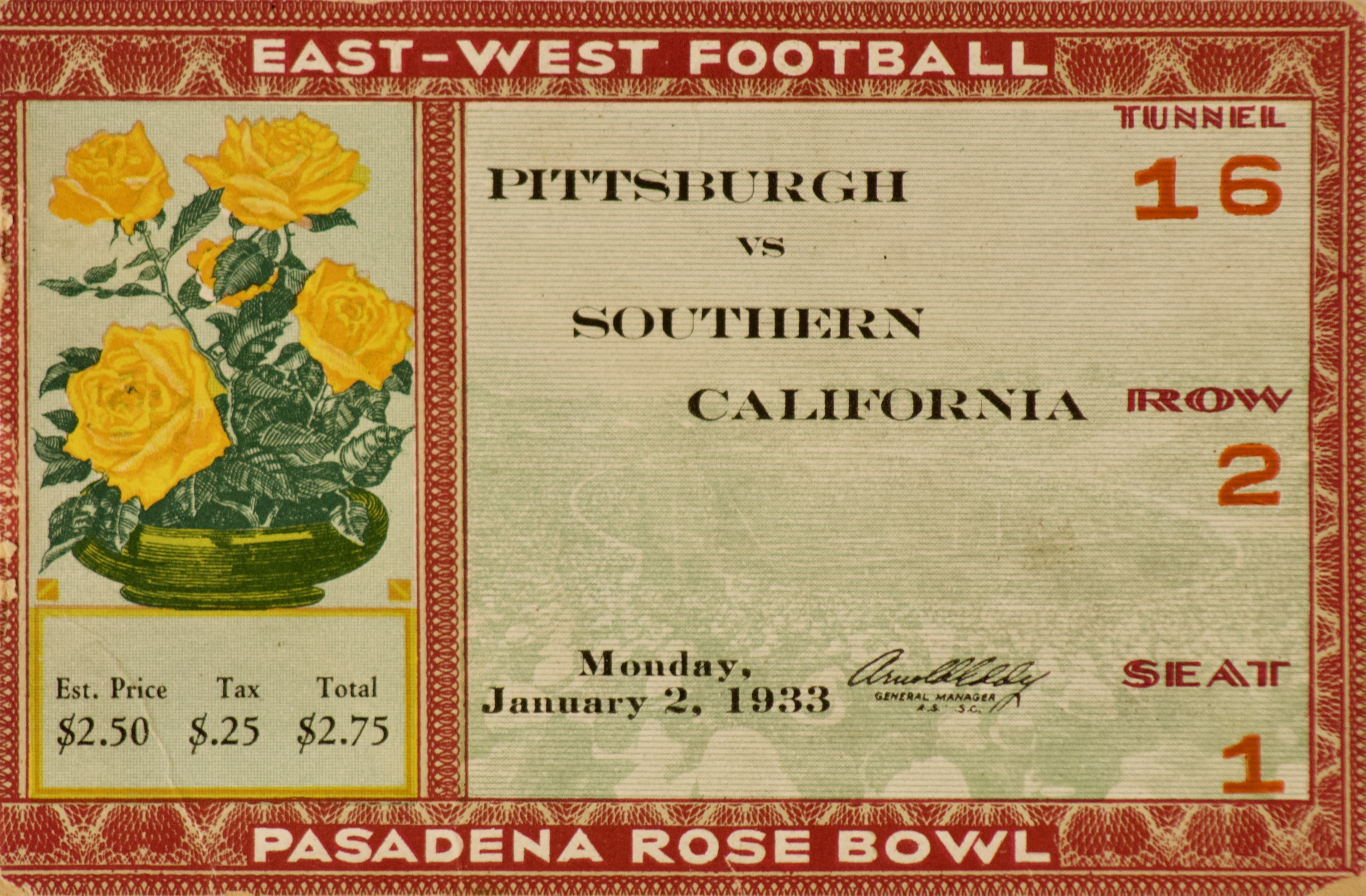
1933 Rose Bowl ticket stub

By virtue of winning the Pacific Coast Conference title for the second season in an row, the undefeated Southern Cal Trojans (10–0) were selected to represent the West in the 1933 Rose Bowl Game. Four teams were deemed worthy opponents by the sportswriters – Michigan, Auburn, Colgate and Pittsburgh. Since Southern teams had represented the East for five of the previous seven years, Auburn (9–0–1) was eliminated from consideration. USC wanted to play unbeaten Michigan (8–0), but the Big Ten Conference could not get all members to agree to send the Wolverines west. Colgate was unbeaten, untied and unscored upon with a 9–0 record, but USC extended the offer to Pitt with their unbeaten 8–0–2 record. USC Athletic Director, Willis O. Hunter, told The San Francisco Examiner: "In selecting Pitt we feel that we have invited a team that has had a more representative schedule than Colgate. Pitt defeated both Notre Dame and Army. They were twice tied but unbeaten. We feel that Pitt is entitled to another crack at us because when we played them two years ago I do not believe they were at their best."

Practice prior to the game was difficult due to the harsh winter in Pittsburgh. In addition, Coach Sutherland had to coach the North squad in a charity all-star game on December 7 in Baltimore, MD. The Panthers ended up practicing indoors at the Hunt Armory. For the final practice before heading west, Coach Sutherland arranged a December 17 game against a Pitt alumni squad. He had the alumni team run the Southern Cal offense and defense. The weather remained frigid and the game was played indoors in front of 2,000 die-hard fans. The makeshift field was 80 yards in length and the quarters were shortened to 10 minutes. The Panther varsity scored a late touchdown on a 55 yard scamper by Henry Weisenbaugh. Tarciscio Onder converted the point after and the varsity won, 7–0.

On December 18, The Pittsburgh Press reported: "Thirty-six football players, three coaches, a team physician, a trainer, a custodian of equipment, four managers and the assistant director of athletics, will comprise the Pitt football party when it leaves here tonight at 11:20 o'clock headed for California..." At noon on Monday, the Panther train had a short layover in St. Louis. To the delight of some curious onlookers Coach Sutherland had the team do some calisthenics on the Union Station platform. Tuesday, they arrived in Dallas and had a scheduled workout with Southern Methodist University on Ownby Field. The weather in Dallas was similar to Pittsburgh – rain, snow and freezing temperatures, but the Panthers were happy to get off the train and work out.

On the ride from Dallas to Tucson, Coach Sutherland mused: "We are gambling our chances on the ten-day stop-over at Tucson. My team is in good shape but it will have to improve. The lack of decent practice weather has hindered us." The next morning they arrived in Tucson which was blanketed in the heaviest snow fall of the past twelve years. Coach Sutherland contemplated moving camp to California, but the weatherman promised sunny days for the remainder of the Panthers stay in Arizona.

On the evening of December 31, the Panthers boarded the train for the thirteen-hour trip to Pasadena. Coach Sutherland admitted "his team is as ready as it will ever be, that his players are physically fit and mentally eager for the fray."

USC coach Homer Jones was in his eighth year and had two previous Rose Bowl victories – 1930 over Pitt, and 1932 over Tulane. His Trojans were the defending National Champs and were on a 19 game winning streak. The USC line featured three All-Americans – tackle Ernie Smith, tackle Tay Brown and guard Aaron Rosenberg. The team was healthy and Coach Jones emphasized the importance of not being over confident. Since the USC line was heavier than Pitt's and Pitt had lost on their two prior trips to the Rose Bowl, the odds makers favored the Trojans by as much as 2 to 1.

In front of the largest Rose Bowl crowd in history (83,000), USC beat Pitt handily (35–0) to capture the Rose Bowl Championship for the fourth time and the National Title for the second consecutive season. USC kicked off and forced the Panthers to punt. The Trojan offense proceeded to advance the ball 62 yards for the opening touchdown. The Pitt offense countered with a drive to the USC 32-yard line, but lost the ball on a fumble by Mike Sebastian. In the second quarter, the Panthers offense penetrated to the Trojan 23-yard line but lost the ball on downs. The halftime score was 7 to 0. USC added a touchdown in the third period. Pitt botched a center snap and Trojan tackle Ray Brown recovered on the Pitt 7-yard line. Four plays later the score read USC 14 to Pitt 0. To open the fourth quarter, the Trojans sustained a 62 yard drive, culminating in a touchdown to extend the score to 21 to 0. Another bad pass from center and a blocked punt led to the final two USC touchdowns of the game. USC totaled 22 first downs to Pitt's 9 and out-gained the Panthers 278 yards to 193. The Trojan defense intercepted two passes and recovered two Pitt fumbles. George H. Beale wrote: “As the Trojans thus earned the best record of any Rose Bowl competitor, the defeat gave Pitt the worst record-three defeats in as many games.”

Jock Sutherland admitted the Trojans should be the National Champs. "It was a smart, aggressive and versatile team," he said. "It took advantage of the breaks. The score was not a real indication of the strength of the two teams for intercepted passes and fumbles played a large part of the scoring spree." Trojan coach Homer Jones stated: "It was a great finish in a great season. The Trojan seniors playing their last game especially turned in fine performances. As to Pittsburgh, the Steel City eleven is one of the strongest we have met and during most of the game it gave us all we could handle. All Pittsburgh players lived up to the reputations which they brought to the coast."

The Pitt starting lineup for the Rose Bowl game was Ted Dailey (left end), Paul Cuba (left tackle), Charles Hartwig (left guard), Joseph Tormey (center), Tarciscio Onder (right guard), Frank Walton (right tackle), Joseph Skladany (right end), Robert Hogan (quarterback), Mike Sebastian (left halfback), Warren Heller (right halfback) and Isadore Weinstock (fullback). Substitutes appearing in the game for Pitt were Harvey Rooker, John Meredith, Ken Ormiston, George Shotwell, Francis Seigel, Robert Hoel, Miller Munjas, Paul Reider, Mike Nicksick, Henry Weisenbaugh and Louis Wojcihovski.

The Pasadena Post reported that while USC and Pitt were battling it out on the gridiron, "five hundred men and boys, armed with stones from the Arroyo Seco, attacked Pasadena police who were guarding the Rose Bowl yesterday afternoon, and after tearing down a portion of the high wire fence, engaged in the worst riot in history of Tournament of Roses East-West games." Police had to use tear gas to disperse the mob. Thirty of the hooligans were arrested. Two policemen and numerous instigators were injured in the fracas.

Scoring summary

Quarter	Time	Drive			Team	Scoring information	Score	
Quarter	Time	Plays	Yards	TOP	Team	Scoring information	Pittsburgh	USC
1		7	62		USC	Ford Palmer 33-yard touchdown reception from Homer Griffith, Ernie Smith kick good	0	7
3		4	7		USC	Griffith 2-yard touchdown reception from Kenneth Bright, Smith kick good	0	14
4		16	66		USC	Irvine Warburton 1-yard touchdown run, Smith kick good	0	21
4		4	21		USC	Warburton 11-yard touchdown run, Smith kick good	0	28
4		6	15		USC	Richard Barber 2-yard touchdown run, George Lady kick good	0	35
"TOP" = time of possession. For other American football terms, see Glossary of American football.							0	35

== Individual scoring summary ==
1932 Pittsburgh Panthers scoring summary
Player	Touchdowns	Extra points	Field goals	Safety	Points
Warren Heller	8	0	0	0	48
Isadore Weinstock	4	9	0	0	33
Mike Sebastian	4	0	0	0	24
Henry A. Weisenbaugh	3	0	0	0	18
Dick Matesic	2	5	0	0	15
James Simms	2	0	0	0	12
Theodore Daily	1	0	0	0	6
Paul Reider	1	0	0	0	6
Joseph Skladany	1	0	0	0	6
Michael Nicksick	1	0	0	0	6
Howard Gelini	1	0	0	0	6
Tarciscio Onder	0	2	0	0	2
Totals	28	14	0	0	182

== Postseason ==
On their last day in L.A., the Panthers were given movie studio tours by Hollywood notables Joe E. Brown and Kay Francis. The next morning they headed east for the Grand Canyon and a donkey ride trip down the Bright Angel Trail. Their final sight-seeing stop was in Albuquerque, N.M. To visit the Isleta Indian village. On Sunday January 8, the Panthers arrived back in Pittsburgh, where they were greeted by a throng of 2,000 well-wishers.

On January 18, the Pittsburgh Athletic Council awarded letters to the following members of the 1932 Pitt varsity football team: Paul Reider, Paul Cuba, Thedore Dailey, John Meredith, Kenneth Ormiston, Arthur Sekay, Joseph Tormey, Tarciscio Onder, Robert Hoel, Joseph Skladany, Robert Hogan, Warren Heller, Francis Seigel, Howard O'Dell, George Shotwell, Isadore Weinstock, Charles Hartwig, Michael Sebastian, Harvey Rooker, Henry Weisenbaugh, Elmer Rosenblum and John McParland.

On Friday February 10, the athletic board of the University of Pittsburgh appointed James Hagan to the office of graduate manager of student athletics. Leroy Lewis (Col. '34) was named varsity manager for the 1933 football season.

On February 26, senior fullback John Luch died from peritonitis, which he contracted after having his appendix removed. In September, at Camp Hamilton he was stricken with a severe case of appendicitis. The doctor advised against the operation at that time, but his recovery was slow and he only played in 2 games. John was a three-letter athlete (football, track and boxing) at Pitt.
