= 1933 Rose Bowl =

American college football game

- 19th Rose Bowl Game; National Championship Game (Note: Through luck and fortuitous scheduling, a "national championship game" was occasionally able to settle the matter on the field, as described in some contemporaneous reports. Despite the promotional billing, in several instances there were plausible scenarios for a third team to be selected as national champion by the major selectors, depending on outcomes of other games.) (Note: When the Dickinson rankings crowned Michigan as national champion, a "peeved" Jack Rissman, a merchant of Chicago, created a new national championship trophy and announced that it would be awarded to the victor of the Rose Bowl matchup between No. 2 USC and No. 3 Pittsburgh (as ranked by Dickinson).)
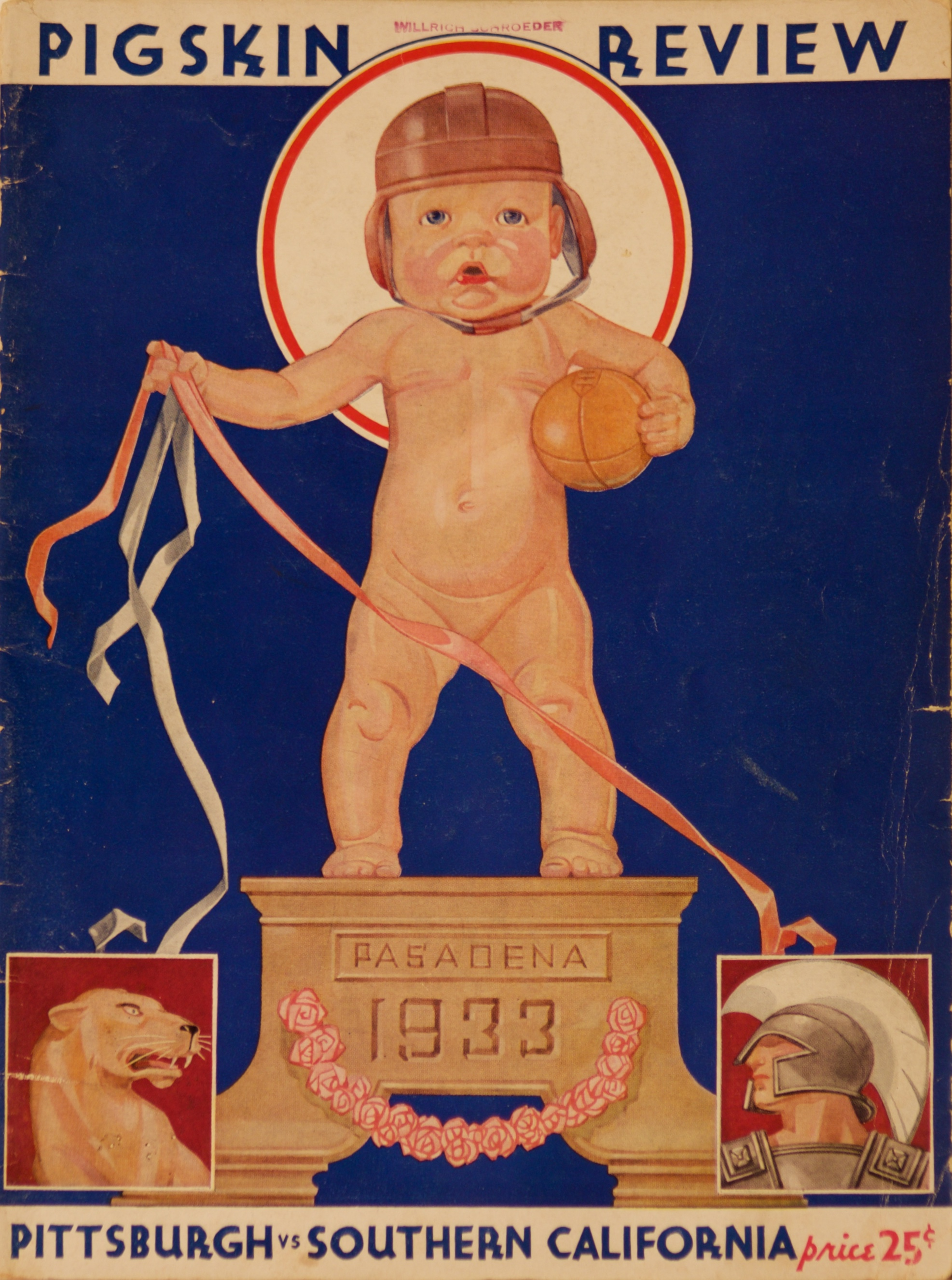
USC Trojans	Pittsburgh Panthers
(9–0)	(8–0–2)
PCC	Independent
35	0
Head coach: Howard Jones	Head coach: Jock Sutherland
	1	2	3	4	Total
USC	7	0	7	21	35
Pittsburgh	0	0	0	0	0
- Date: January 2, 1933
- Season: 1932
- Stadium: Rose Bowl Stadium
- Location: Pasadena, California
- MVP: Homer Griffith (QB) – USC
- Referee: Dexter Very
- Attendance: 85,000

The 1933 Rose Bowl was the 19th Rose Bowl game, an American post-season college football game that was played on January 2, 1933, at the Rose Bowl in Pasadena, California. While normally played on New Year's Day, the 1933 game was played on the second as New Year's Day was a Sunday. In the game, the undefeated 9–0 1932 USC Trojans football team defeated the 8–0–2 1932 Pittsburgh Panthers football team by a 35–0 score. The score had been 7–0 at halftime, but USC exploded for three touchdowns in the fourth quarter. The 35-point defeat was the most one-sided loss in Pittsburgh football history up to that time.

In the final Dickinson System rankings released in early December 1932, USC was ranked No. 2 behind 8–0 Michigan. Jack F. Rissman, a Chicago clothing merchant who had previously donated a trophy presented to the No. 1 team in the Dickinson rankings, had stated publicly that he expected USC to be ranked No. 1 by Dickinson if it defeated Notre Dame in the final game of the regular season. When the Dickinson rankings instead crowned Michigan as national champion, giving the Wolverines the Rockne Trophy, a "peeved" Rissman created a new national championship trophy (called the Rissman Trophy) and announced that it would be awarded to the victor of the Rose Bowl matchup between No. 2 USC and No. 3 Pittsburgh. One critic at the time parodied Rissman's proliferation of personal championship trophies, writing: "All that is needed now to make the football season a complete success is for someone to figure out a system to declare Colgate the undisputed national champion and to give the Red Raiders a trophy indicative of the same. [...] More national champions, more systems of picking them and more trophies to give them have long been the crying need of football. [...] It might even be worked out so Slippery Rock and Knox could have very fine trophies for their Y.M.C.A. trophy rooms. [...] Under the Beale system, I hereby award the national football championship to Bucknell (dear old alma mater)." With USC's decisive victory in the Rose Bowl, Rissman presented his trophy to USC on January 6th.

== Scoring ==
=== First Quarter ===
- USC – Wehunt, 33-yard pass from Homer Griffith (Smith kick good) 8:24 7-0 USC

=== Third Quarter ===
- USC – Homer Griffith, 1-yard pass from Bright (Smith kick good) 4:34 14-0 USC

=== Fourth Quarter ===
- USC – Cotton Warburton, 1-yard run (Smith kick good) 13:21 21-0 USC
- USC – Warburton, 11-yard run (Smith kick good) 8:14 28-0 USC
- USC – Barber, 2-yard run (Lady kick good) 2:29 35-0 USC
