= Homer Griffith =

American football player (1912–1990)

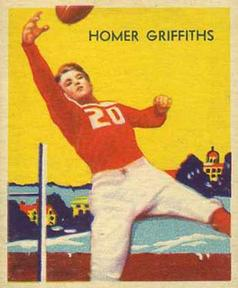

No. 28
- Position: Tailback

Personal information
- Born: July 24, 1912; Los Angeles, California, U.S.
- Died: January 31, 1990 (aged 77); Tarzana, California, U.S.
- Listed height: 5 ft 11 in (1.80 m)
- Listed weight: 165 lb (75 kg)

Career information
- High school: Fairfax (Los Angeles)
- College: USC (1930–1933)

Career history
- Chicago Cardinals (1934)

Awards and highlights
- First-team All-PCC (1932); Rose Bowl MVP (1933); Rose Bowl champion

Career statistics
- Games played: 9
- Rushing yards: 66
- Stats at Pro Football Reference

Homer Oliver Griffith Jr. (July 24, 1912 – January 31, 1990) was an American football tailback who played one seasons in the National Football League (NFL) for the Chicago Cardinals during the 1934 Chicago Cardinals season. He played college football for USC and was part of the national champion 1932 USC Trojans football team as the team's quarterback.
