= Bob Hoel =

American football player (1913–2001)

- Hoel, circa 1932

No. 47, 48, 43
- Position: Guard

Personal information
- Born: June 5, 1913; Alden, Minnesota, U.S.
- Died: December 14, 2001 (aged 88); Glenview, Illinois, U.S.
- Listed height: 6 ft 0 in (1.83 m)
- Listed weight: 208 lb (94 kg)

Career information
- High school: Evanston Township (Evanston, Illinois)
- College: Pittsburgh

Career history
- Pittsburgh Pirates (1935); Chicago Gunners (1936–1937); Chicago Cardinals (1937–1938)
- Stats at Pro Football Reference

Robert Malcolm Hoel (June 5, 1913 – December 14, 2001) was an American professional football guard who played in the National Football League (NFL) with the Pittsburgh Pirates and Chicago Cardinals. He played college football for the Pittsburgh Panthers.

== Early life ==
Robert Malcolm Hoel was born on June 5, 1913, in Alden, Minnesota. He attended Evanston Township High School in Evanston, Illinois.

== College career ==
Hoel enrolled at the University of Pittsburgh to play college football for the Panthers. He became a starter at tackle during training camp of his sophomore year in 1932. He was a three-year varsity letterman from 1932 to 1934.

== Professional career ==
Hoel played in all 12 games, starting nine, for the Pittsburgh Pirates of the National Football League (NFL) in 1935 as a guard. The Pirates finished the year with a 4–8 record. On August 20, 1936, Hoel sent a telegram to team president Art Rooney informing him that he had decided to retire.

Hoel played for the Chicago Gunners during the 1936 and 1937 seasons at tackle. He played in one game for the NFL's Chicago Cardinals as a reserve tackle during the 1937 NFL season. He appeared in four games, starting one, at guard for the Cardinals in 1938.

== Personal life ==
Hoel was an assistant coach for the Pittsburgh Panthers during the 1930s and 1940s. He died on December 14, 2001, in Glenview, Illinois.
