= 1932 West Coast Army football team =

American college football season

1932 West Coast Army football
- Conference: Independent
- Record: 3–6
- Head coach: Mr. Stokes
- Home stadium: Kezar Stadium

1932 Western college football independents records
	Conf.			Overall
Team	W	L	T	W		L		T
Columbia (OR)		–		6	–	0	–	1
Saint Mary's		–		6	–	2	–	1
Santa Clara		–		6	–	3	–	0
Gonzaga		–		5	–	3	–	0
Hawaii		–		2	–	1	–	1
Cal Poly		–		4	–	4	–	0
Loyola (CA)		–		4	–	4	–	0
San Francisco		–		2	–	6	–	0
Humboldt State		–		1	–	4	–	0
San Francisco State		–		1	–	7	–	0

The 1932 West Coast Army football team was an American football team that represented the West Coast Army during the 1932 college football season.

== Schedule ==
Date	Opponent	Site	Result	Attendance	Source
September 10?	Olympic Club		W 7–0		
September 17	Cal Aggies	Kezar Stadium; San Francisco, CA	Cancelled		
September 17?	San Diego Marines		L 6–7		
September 24	Saint Mary's	Kezar Stadium; San Francisco, CA	L 0–20	20,000	
October 1	at Fresno State	Fresno State College Stadium; Fresno, CA	W 7–6		
October 8	San Francisco	Kezar Stadium; San Francisco, CA	W 13–7		
October 15	at Stanford	Stanford Stadium; Stanford, CA	L 0–26		
October 23	at West Seattle Athletic Club	Seattle, WA	L 6–7		
October 28	at Oregon State	Bell Field; Corvallis, OR	L 9–20		
November 12	at West Coast Navy	California Memorial Stadium; Berkeley, CA	L 0–30	70,000	
