= 1932 San Diego Marines Devil Dogs football team =

American college football season

1932 San Diego Marines Devil Dogs football
- Conference: Independent
- Record: 4–6
- Head coach: John Beckett (2nd season)

1932 Western college football independents records
	Conf.			Overall
Team	W	L	T	W		L		T
Columbia (OR)		–		6	–	0	–	1
Saint Mary's		–		6	–	2	–	1
Santa Clara		–		6	–	3	–	0
Gonzaga		–		5	–	3	–	0
Hawaii		–		2	–	1	–	1
Cal Poly		–		4	–	4	–	0
Loyola (CA)		–		4	–	4	–	0
San Francisco		–		2	–	6	–	0
Humboldt State		–		1	–	4	–	0
San Francisco State		–		1	–	7	–	0

The 1932 San Diego Marines Devil Dogs football team (also known as the West Coast Marines) represented Marine Corps Recruit Depot San Diego during the 1932 college football season. Following a fairly successful 1931 season, the Devil Dogs lost five of their final six games and finished with a 4–6 record.

== Schedule ==
Date	Time	Opponent	Site	Result	Attendance	Source
September 12		Santa Barbara Athletic Club	San Diego, CA	W 11–0		
September 18	2:30 p.m.	West Coast Army	San Diego, CA	W 7–6		
September 24		at Fresno State	Blackstone Stadium?; Fresno, CA	L 0–12	4,500	
October 1		New Mexico A&M	San Diego, CA	W 12–0		
October 9		Loyola (CA)	Municipal Stadium; San Diego, CA	L 0–6		
October 16		Santa Clara	San Diego, CA	L 0–32		
October 30		West Coast Navy	San Diego, CA	L 0–13	12,000	
November 6		Olympic Club	San Diego, CA	L 7–12		
November 11		San Diego State	Balboa Stadium; San Diego, CA	W 14–0	9,000	
November 20	2:15 p.m.	Stockton American Legion	San Diego, CA	L 0–7		
