= 1932 BYU Cougars football team =

American college football season

1932 BYU Cougars football
- Conference: Rocky Mountain Conference
- Record: 8–1 (5–1 RMC)
- Head coach: G. Ott Romney (5th season)
- Captain: Lloyd Shields
- Home stadium: BYU Stadium

1932 Rocky Mountain Conference football standings
	Conf.					Overall
Team	W		L		T	W		L		T
Utah $	6	–	0	–	0	6	–	1	–	1
BYU	5	–	1	–	0	8	–	1	–	0
Colorado College	5	–	2	–	0	5	–	2	–	0
Denver	4	–	1	–	1	4	–	3	–	1
Colorado Agricultural	4	–	3	–	1	4	–	3	–	1
Colorado Teachers	2	–	2	–	1	4	–	2	–	1
Utah State	3	–	3	–	0	4	–	4	–	0
Colorado	2	–	4	–	0	2	–	4	–	0
Wyoming	1	–	4	–	1	2	–	6	–	1
Colorado Mines	1	–	5	–	0	1	–	7	–	0
Montana State	0	–	3	–	0	3	–	3	–	1
Western State (CO)	0	–	5	–	0	1	–	5	–	0
$ – Conference champion

The 1932 BYU Cougars football team was an American football team that represented Brigham Young University (BYU) as a member of the Rocky Mountain Conference (RMC) during the 1932 college football season. In their fifth season under head coach G. Ott Romney, the Cougars compiled an overall record of 8–1 with a mark of 5–1 against conference opponents, finished second in the RMC, and outscored opponents by a total of 188 to 50. The team's only loss was to rival Utah.

Lloyd Shields was the team captain. Four BYU players received honors on the 1932 All-Rocky Mountain Conference football teams selected by the United Press (UP) and The Salt Lake Telegram (SLT): Shields (UP 1st-team guard); Vernon Richardson (SLT 1st-team tackle; UP 2nd-team guard); Burle Robison (UP and SLT second-team end); and George Bertotti (UP and SLT second-team halfback).

Vice President Charles Curtis attended the annual rivalry game with Utah.

== Schedule ==
Date	Opponent	Site	Result	Attendance	Source
September 23	vs. Montana State	Ogden Stadium; Ogden, UT	W 6–0	> 4,000	
October 1	at Western State (CO)	Gunnison, CO	W 38–6		
October 7	at Occidental*	Rose Bowl; Pasadena, CA	W 46–0	5,000	
October 15	at Utah	Ute Stadium; Salt Lake City, UT (rivalry)	L 0–29	> 15,000	
October 22	Colorado Teachers	BYU Stadium; Provo, UT	W 20–2	2,500	
October 29	at Wyoming	Corbett Field; Laramie, WY	W 25–0		
November 4	at Idaho Southern Branch*	Pocatello, ID	W 32–0		
November 19	Utah State^{†}	BYU Stadium; Provo, UT (rivalry)	W 18–6	6,500	
November 24	vs. South Dakota*	Ogden Stadium; Ogden, UT	W 13–7	2,000	
*Non-conference game; ^{†}Homecoming
