= Spud Lewis =

American football player and coach (1906–1978)

Biographical details
- Born: 1906
- Died: November 29, 1978 (aged 71–72); San Francisco, California, U.S.

Playing career
- 1926–1928: Stanford
- Positions: Quarterback, halfback, fullback

Coaching career (HC unless noted)
- 1929–1931: Northwestern (assistant)
- 1932–1936: San Francisco

Head coaching record
- Overall: 15–21–4

Accomplishments and honors

Championships
- National (1926)

Lawrence D. "Spud" Lewis (1906 – November 29, 1978) was an American football player and coach. He was the head football coach at the University of San Francisco from 1932 to 1936, compiling a record of 15–21–4. Lewis played college football at Stanford University as a quarterback, halfback and fullback for head coach Pop Warner. He worked as an assistant football coach at Northwestern University under head coach Dick Hanley for three seasons, from 1929 to 1931, before he was hired at San Francisco in 1932.

Lewis was for many years after his time in football a sales executive for Judson Steel.

Lewis died on November 29, 1978, in San Francisco, following a long illness.

== Head coaching record ==
Year	Team	Overall	Conference	Standing	Bowl/playoffs
San Francisco Dons (Independent) (1932–1936)
1932	San Francisco	2–6			
1933	San Francisco	1–5–1			
1934	San Francisco	3–3–1			
1935	San Francisco	5–3			
1936	San Francisco	4–4–2			
San Francisco:		15–21–4			
Total:		15–21–4			
