= 1932 USC Trojans football team =

American college football season

1932 USC Trojans football

National champion (nine selectors) Co-national champion (Davis, Sagarin) PCC champion Rose Bowl champion

Rose Bowl, W 35–0 vs. Pittsburgh
- Conference: Pacific Coast Conference
- Record: 10–0 (6–0 PCC)
- Head coach: Howard Jones (8th season)
- Offensive scheme: Single-wing
- Captain: Tay Brown
- Home stadium: Los Angeles Memorial Coliseum

1932 Pacific Coast Conference football standings
	Conf.					Overall
Team	W		L		T	W		L		T
No. 2 USC $	6	–	0	–	0	10	–	0	–	0
Washington State	5	–	1	–	1	7	–	1	–	1
UCLA	4	–	2	–	0	6	–	4	–	0
Washington	3	–	2	–	2	6	–	2	–	2
Oregon	2	–	2	–	1	6	–	3	–	1
California	2	–	2	–	1	7	–	3	–	2
Stanford	1	–	3	–	1	6	–	4	–	1
Oregon State	1	–	4	–	0	4	–	6	–	0
Idaho	1	–	4	–	0	3	–	5	–	0
Montana	0	–	5	–	0	2	–	7	–	0
$ – Conference champion; Rankings from Dickinson System

The 1932 USC Trojans football team is an American football team that represented the University of Southern California (USC) in the Pacific Coast Conference (PCC) during the 1932 college football season. In its eighth season under head coach Howard Jones, the team compiled a perfect 10–0 record (6–0 against conference opponents), won the PCC championship, shut out eight of ten opponents, defeated Pittsburgh in the 1933 Rose Bowl, and outscored all opponents by a total of 201 to 13.

The Knute K. Rockne Trophy was presented at the end of the season to the team deemed to be the national champion using the Dickinson System, a rating system developed by Frank G. Dickinson, a professor of economics of the University of Illinois. Michigan won the Rockne Trophy, edging USC by a margin of 28.47 to 26.81. However, USC was recognized as the 1932 national champion in several other rankings, including Berryman, Billingsley, Boand, Dunkel, College Football Researchers Association, Helms, Houlgate, National Championship Foundation, Poling, and Williamson.

Tackle Ernie Smith was a consensus first-team pick for the 1932 All-America team. Guard Aaron Rosenberg was also selected as a first-team All-American by the Football Writers Association of America and Liberty magazine. Six USC players were selected as first-team players on the 1932 All-Pacific Coast football team: Ernie Smith (AP-1; NEA-1; UP-1); Rosenberg (AP-1; NEA-1); Tay Brown at tackle (AP-1; NEA-1; UP-1); Orville Mohler at quarterback (NEA-1; UP-1); Homer Griffith at quarterback (AP-1); and Ray Sparling at end (NEA-1).

== Schedule ==
Date	Opponent	Site	Result	Attendance	Source
September 24	Utah*	Los Angeles Memorial Coliseum; Los Angeles, CA	W 35–0	35,000	
October 1	Washington State	Los Angeles Memorial Coliseum; Los Angeles, CA	W 20–0	35,000	
October 8	Oregon State	Los Angeles Memorial Coliseum; Los Angeles, CA	W 10–0	40,000	
October 15	Loyola (CA)*	Los Angeles Memorial Coliseum; Los Angeles, CA	W 6–0	50,000	
October 22	at Stanford	Stanford Stadium; Stanford, CA (rivalry)	W 13–0	60,000	
November 5	California	Los Angeles Memorial Coliseum; Los Angeles, CA	W 27–7	70,000	
November 12	Oregon	Los Angeles Memorial Coliseum; Los Angeles, CA	W 33–0	40,000	
November 24	at Washington	Husky Stadium; Seattle, WA	W 9–6	30,000	
December 10	Notre Dame*^{†}	Los Angeles Memorial Coliseum; Los Angeles, CA (rivalry)	W 13–0	100,000	
January 2, 1933	vs. Pittsburgh*	Rose Bowl; Pasadena, CA (Rose Bowl)	W 35–0	83,000	
*Non-conference game; ^{†}Homecoming

== Roster ==
- Dick Barber, FB
- Oliver Bardin, G
- Francis Beard, G
- Julius Bescos, E
- Henry Biggs, E
- Kenneth Bright, HB
- Tay Brown, T
- Ward Browning, E
- Gordon Clark, HB
- Cal Clemens, HB
- Alvie Coughlin, T
- Corwin Dunning, C
- John Dye, G
- Robert Erskine, T
- Kenneth Fay, HB
- Bob Fuhrer, E
- Byron Gentry, G
- Bob Getz, FB
- Homer Griffith, QB
- David Harlan, T
- Hueston Harper, T
- Ellwood Jorgenson, T
- Anthony Jurich, HB
- Garland Matthews, QB
- Francis McGinley, G
- Bob McNeish, HB
- Orville Mohler, QB
- Neil Norris, E
- George Lady, T
- Robert Love, E
- Robert Morrison, FB
- David Packard, T
- Ford Palmer, E
- Alfred Plaehn, T
- Al Reboin, HB
- Gene Ridings, FB
- Aaron Rosenberg, G
- John Seixas, E
- Kenneth Shannon, HB
- Ernie Smith, T
- Stanley Smith, G
- Raymond Sparling, E
- Lawrence Stevens, G
- Howie Tipton, HB
- Cotton Warburton, QB
- James Webb, HB
- Frank Williamson, G
- Jack Williamson
- Haskell Robert "Inky" Wotkyns, FB
- Curt Youel, C
