= 1932 Montana State Bobcats football team =

American college football season

1932 Montana State Bobcats football
- Conference: Rocky Mountain Conference
- Record: 3–3–1 (0–3 RMC)
- Head coach: Schubert R. Dyche (5th season)
- Home stadium: Gatton Field

1932 Rocky Mountain Conference football standings
	Conf.					Overall
Team	W		L		T	W		L		T
Utah $	6	–	0	–	0	6	–	1	–	1
BYU	5	–	1	–	0	8	–	1	–	0
Colorado College	5	–	2	–	0	5	–	2	–	0
Denver	4	–	1	–	1	4	–	3	–	1
Colorado Agricultural	4	–	3	–	1	4	–	3	–	1
Colorado Teachers	2	–	2	–	1	4	–	2	–	1
Utah State	3	–	3	–	0	4	–	4	–	0
Colorado	2	–	4	–	0	2	–	4	–	0
Wyoming	1	–	4	–	1	2	–	6	–	1
Colorado Mines	1	–	5	–	0	1	–	7	–	0
Montana State	0	–	3	–	0	3	–	3	–	1
Western State (CO)	0	–	5	–	0	1	–	5	–	0
$ – Conference champion

The 1932 Montana State Bobcats football team was an American football team that represented Montana State College (later renamed Montana State University) in the Rocky Mountain Conference (RMC) during the 1932 college football season. In its fifth season under head coach Schubert R. Dyche, the team compiled a 3–3–1 record (0–3 against RMC opponents) and was outscored by a total of 59 to 46.

== Schedule ==
Date	Opponent	Site	Result	Attendance	Source
September 23	vs. BYU	Ogden Municipal Stadium; Ogden, UT	L 0–6	> 4,000	
October 1	at Utah State	Aggie Stadium; Logan, UT	L 0–26		
October 8	Idaho Southern Branch*	Gatton Field; Bozeman, MT	T 0–0		
October 15	at Wyoming	Corbett Field; Laramie, WY	L 7–13		
October 22	vs. Montana*	Clark Park; Butte, MT (rivalry)	W 19–7	5,600	
October 29	at Montana Mines*	Clark Park; Butte, MT	W 7–0	< 1,200	
November 11	Carroll (MT)*^{†}	Gatton Field; Bozeman, MT	W 13–7	2,000	
*Non-conference game; ^{†}Homecoming
