= 1932 Montana Grizzlies football team =

American college football season

1932 Montana Grizzlies football
- Conference: Pacific Coast Conference
- Record: 2–7 (0–5 PCC)
- Head coach: Bunny Oakes (2nd season)
- Home stadium: Dornblaser Field

1932 Pacific Coast Conference football standings
	Conf.					Overall
Team	W		L		T	W		L		T
No. 2 USC $	6	–	0	–	0	10	–	0	–	0
Washington State	5	–	1	–	1	7	–	1	–	1
UCLA	4	–	2	–	0	6	–	4	–	0
Washington	3	–	2	–	2	6	–	2	–	2
Oregon	2	–	2	–	1	6	–	3	–	1
California	2	–	2	–	1	7	–	3	–	2
Stanford	1	–	3	–	1	6	–	4	–	1
Oregon State	1	–	4	–	0	4	–	6	–	0
Idaho	1	–	4	–	0	3	–	5	–	0
Montana	0	–	5	–	0	2	–	7	–	0
$ – Conference champion; Rankings from Dickinson System

The 1932 Montana Grizzlies football team was an American football team that represented the University of Montana in the 1932 college football season as a member of the Pacific Coast Conference (PCC). In its second season under head coach Bunny Oakes, the team compiled a 2–7 record (0–5 in conference), finished in last place in the PCC, and was outscored by a total of 224 to 84. The team played its home games at Dornblaser Field.

== Schedule ==
Date	Opponent	Site	Result	Attendance	Source
September 24	Anaconda Anodes*	Dornblaser Field; Missoula, MT	W 25–0		
October 1	at Washington	Husky Stadium; Seattle, WA	L 13–26	8,882	
October 8	Carroll (MT)*	Dornblaser Field; Missoula, MT	W 14–6		
October 15	Idaho	Dornblaser Field; Missoula, MT (rivalry)	L 6–19		
October 22	vs. Montana State*	Clark Park; Butte, MT (rivalry)	L 7–19	5,600	
October 29	at Washington State	Rogers Field; Pullman, WA	L 0–31	3,000	
November 12	Oregon State	Dornblaser Field; Missoula, MT	L 6–35		
November 19	at UCLA	Los Angeles Memorial Coliseum; Los Angeles, CA	L 0–32	11,000	
November 26	at Gonzaga*	Spokane, WA	L 13–56	4,000	
*Non-conference game
