= 1932 Pacific Tigers football team =

American college football season

1932 Pacific Tigers football
- Conference: Far Western Conference
- Record: 4–4 (2–2 FWC)
- Head coach: Erwin Righter (12th season)
- Home stadium: Baxter Stadium

1932 Far Western Conference football standings
	Conf.					Overall
Team	W		L		T	W		L		T
San Jose State +	3	–	0	–	2	7	–	0	–	2
Nevada +	2	–	0	–	1	3	–	3	–	2
Chico State	2	–	1	–	0	3	–	5	–	0
Pacific (CA)	2	–	2	–	0	4	–	4	–	0
Cal Aggies	1	–	4	–	0	1	–	8	–	1
Fresno State	0	–	3	–	1	3	–	5	–	2
+ – Conference co-champions

The 1932 Pacific Tigers football team represented the College of the Pacific—now known as the University of the Pacific—in Stockton, California as a member of the Far Western Conference (FWC) during the 1932 college football season. The team was led by Erwin Righter in his 12th and final season as head coach, and played home games at Baxter Stadium in Stockton. Pacific compiled an overall record of 4–4 with a mark of 2–2 in conference play, placing fourth in the FWC. The Tigers outscored their opponents 125 to 73 for the season.

== Schedule ==
Date	Opponent	Site	Result	Source
September 23	Modesto*	Baxter Stadium; Stockton, CA	W 20–0	
October 1	Stockton American Legion*	Baxter Stadium; Stockton, CA	L 6–7	
October 7	San Jose State	Baxter Stadium; Stockton, CA (rivalry)	L 0–7	
October 14	at Cal Aggies	Davis, CA	W 30–0	
October 29	Fresno State^{†}	Baxter Stadium; Stockton, CA	W 35–0	
November 5	at Santa Clara*	San Francisco, CA	L 0–27	
November 11	at Sacramento*	Sacramento, CA	W 20–12	
December 24	at Chico State	College Field; Chico, CA	L 14–20	
*Non-conference game; ^{†}Homecoming
