= 1932 Arizona State–Flagstaff Lumberjacks football team =

American college football season

1932 Arizona State–Flagstaff Lumberjacks football
- Conference: Border Conference
- Record: 3–2–2 (2–2 Border)
- Head coach: Rudy Lavik (6th season)
- Home stadium: Skidmore Field

1932 Border Conference football standings
	Conf.					Overall
Team	W		L		T	W		L		T
Texas Tech	2	–	0	–	0	10	–	2	–	0
Arizona	3	–	2	–	0	4	–	5	–	0
Arizona State	2	–	2	–	0	4	–	3	–	1
Arizona State–Flagstaff	2	–	2	–	0	3	–	2	–	2
New Mexico A&M	1	–	2	–	1	4	–	5	–	1
New Mexico	1	–	3	–	1	1	–	5	–	1
Arizona State and Arizona State–Flagstaff played twice, but only the second meeting counted in the conference standings.

The 1932 Arizona State–Flagstaff Lumberjacks football team represented Arizona State Teachers College at Flagstaff (now known as Northern Arizona University) as a member of the Border Conference during the 1932 college football season. Led by sixth-year head coach Rudy Lavik, the Lumberjacks compiled an overall record of 3–2–2 with a mark of 2–2 in conference play, tying for third place in the Border Conference.

== Schedule ==
Date	Opponent	Site	Result	Attendance	Source
October 8	at New Mexico	University Field; Albuquerque, NM	L 0–6		
October 15	Arizona State (Note: The first game between Arizona State–Flagstaff and Arizona State did not count in the Border Conference standings.)*^{†}	Skidmore Field; Flagstaff, AZ	T 6–6		
October 29	vs. Arizona	Montgomery Stadium; Phoenix, AZ	W 7–6	2,500	
November 5	Fresno State*	Skidmore Field; Flagstaff, AZ	T 0–0		
November 11	at New Mexico A&M	Miller Field; Las Cruces, NM	L 0–7		
November 24	at Arizona State	Irish Field; Tempe, AZ	W 20–6		
January 2, 1933	vs. Phoenix All-Stars*	Montgomery Stadium; Phoenix, AZ	W 7–0		
*Non-conference game; ^{†}Homecoming
