= 1932 Colorado Agricultural Aggies football team =

American college football season

1932 Colorado Agricultural Aggies football
- Conference: Rocky Mountain Conference
- Record: 4–3–1 (4–3–1 RMC)
- Head coach: Harry W. Hughes (22nd season)
- Home stadium: Colorado Field

1932 Rocky Mountain Conference football standings
	Conf.					Overall
Team	W		L		T	W		L		T
Utah $	6	–	0	–	0	6	–	1	–	1
BYU	5	–	1	–	0	8	–	1	–	0
Colorado College	5	–	2	–	0	5	–	2	–	0
Denver	4	–	1	–	1	4	–	3	–	1
Colorado Agricultural	4	–	3	–	1	4	–	3	–	1
Colorado Teachers	2	–	2	–	1	4	–	2	–	1
Utah State	3	–	3	–	0	4	–	4	–	0
Colorado	2	–	4	–	0	2	–	4	–	0
Wyoming	1	–	4	–	1	2	–	6	–	1
Colorado Mines	1	–	5	–	0	1	–	7	–	0
Montana State	0	–	3	–	0	3	–	3	–	1
Western State (CO)	0	–	5	–	0	1	–	5	–	0
$ – Conference champion

The 1932 Colorado Agricultural Aggies football team represented Colorado Agricultural College (now known as Colorado State University) in the Rocky Mountain Conference (RMC) during the 1932 college football season. In their 22nd season under head coach Harry W. Hughes, the Aggies compiled a 4–3–1 record, finished sixth in the RMC, and outscored opponents by a total of 100 to 45.

== Schedule ==
Date	Opponent	Site	Result	Attendance	Source
October 1	at Colorado Teachers	Jackson Field; Greeley, CO	W 12–0		
October 8	Colorado Mines	Colorado Field; Fort Collins, CO	W 39–0		
October 15	at Denver	Denver University Stadium; Denver, CO	T 7–7	10,000	
October 22	at Colorado	Colorado Stadium; Boulder, CO (rivalry)	W 7–6		
October 29	Colorado College^{†}	Colorado Field; Fort Collins, CO	L 0–3		
November 5	at Utah State	Aggie Stadium; Logan, UT	L 12–13		
November 19	Utah	Colorado Field; Fort Collins, CO	L 0–16		
November 24	Wyoming	Colorado Field; Fort Collins, CO (rivalry)	W 23–0		
^{†}Homecoming
