= 1932 Whittier Poets football team =

American college football season

1932 Whittier Poets football
- 1933 Whittier team with Richard Nixon (No. 12)

SCC champion
- Conference: Southern California Conference
- Record: 10–1 (5–1 SCC)
- Head coach: Wallace Newman (4th season)
- Captain: Bob Gibbs
- Home stadium: Hadley Field

1932 Southern California Conference football standings
	Conf.					Overall
Team	W		L		T	W		L		T
Whittier $	5	–	1	–	0	10	–	1	–	0
Redlands	5	–	2	–	0	7	–	2	–	0
La Verne	5	–	2	–	0	6	–	2	–	0
Occidental	4	–	2	–	1	4	–	4	–	1
Pomona	2	–	4	–	0	2	–	4	–	0
San Diego State	2	–	4	–	1	3	–	5	–	1
Caltech	2	–	5	–	0	2	–	7	–	0
Santa Barbara State	1	–	6	–	0	1	–	6	–	0
$ – Conference champion

The 1932 Whittier Poets football team was an American football team that represented Whittier College in the Southern California Conference (SCC) during the 1932 college football season. In its fourth season under head coach Wallace Newman, the team compiled a 10–1 record (5–1 against conference opponents) and won the SCC championship. Tackle Bob Gibbs was the team captain. The team played its home games at Hadley Field in Whittier, California.

== Role of Richard Nixon ==
Richard Nixon played for the team at the tackle position, and occasionally at end. Though typically a reserve, Nixon was the team's starting left tackle in its October 28 victory over the 160th Infantry team. The team's waterboy, Harold Litten, recalled that Nixon was uncoordinated and "had two left feet" but was a leader: "But, boy, was he an inspiration! He was always talking it up. That's why Chief let him hang around. He was one of those inspirational guys every team needs."

Coach Newman in 1969 said the following of Nixon's role on the team: "No, he never did get a letter, he wasn't that good. But what a scrapper. I remember some of the boys then telling what a licking Dick was taking. And we all marveled at the way he got up and came back for more. . . . Dick had enthusiasm and drive, you betcha. And no one had more moxie. To be a sub, and as light as he was, even then, was rugged. He was practice bait. I don't know if I could have taken the beating he took. Dick liked the battle, though, and the smell of the sweat."

Nixon later said that he admired coach Newman more than any man he had known other than his father.

== Schedule ==
Date	Opponent	Site	Result	Attendance	Source
September 23	Chaffey J.C.	Hadley Field; Whittier, CA	W 6–0	6,000	
September 23	Los Angeles J.C.	Hadley Field; Whittier, CA	W 20–0	6,000	
October 1	at Arizona State	Irish Field; Tempe, AZ	W 26–0		
October 7	Caltech	Hadley Field; Whittier, CA	W 34–7	5,000	
October 14	vs. Occidental	Rose Bowl; Pasadena, CA (rivalry)	L 7–20		
October 21	at La Verne	La Verne, CA	W 13–0	5,000	
October 27	160th Infantry	Hadley Field; Whittier, CA	W 42–0		
November 5	at San Diego State	Balboa Stadium; San Diego, CA	W 18–14		
November 11	Loyola (CA)	Hadley Field; Whittier, CA	W 15–0	6,000	
November 19	Santa Barbara State	Hadley Field; Whittier, CA	W 46–6		
November 24	Redlands	Hadley Field; Whittier, CA	W 13–7	6,000	
