= August W. Farwick =

American football player and coach (1902–1977)

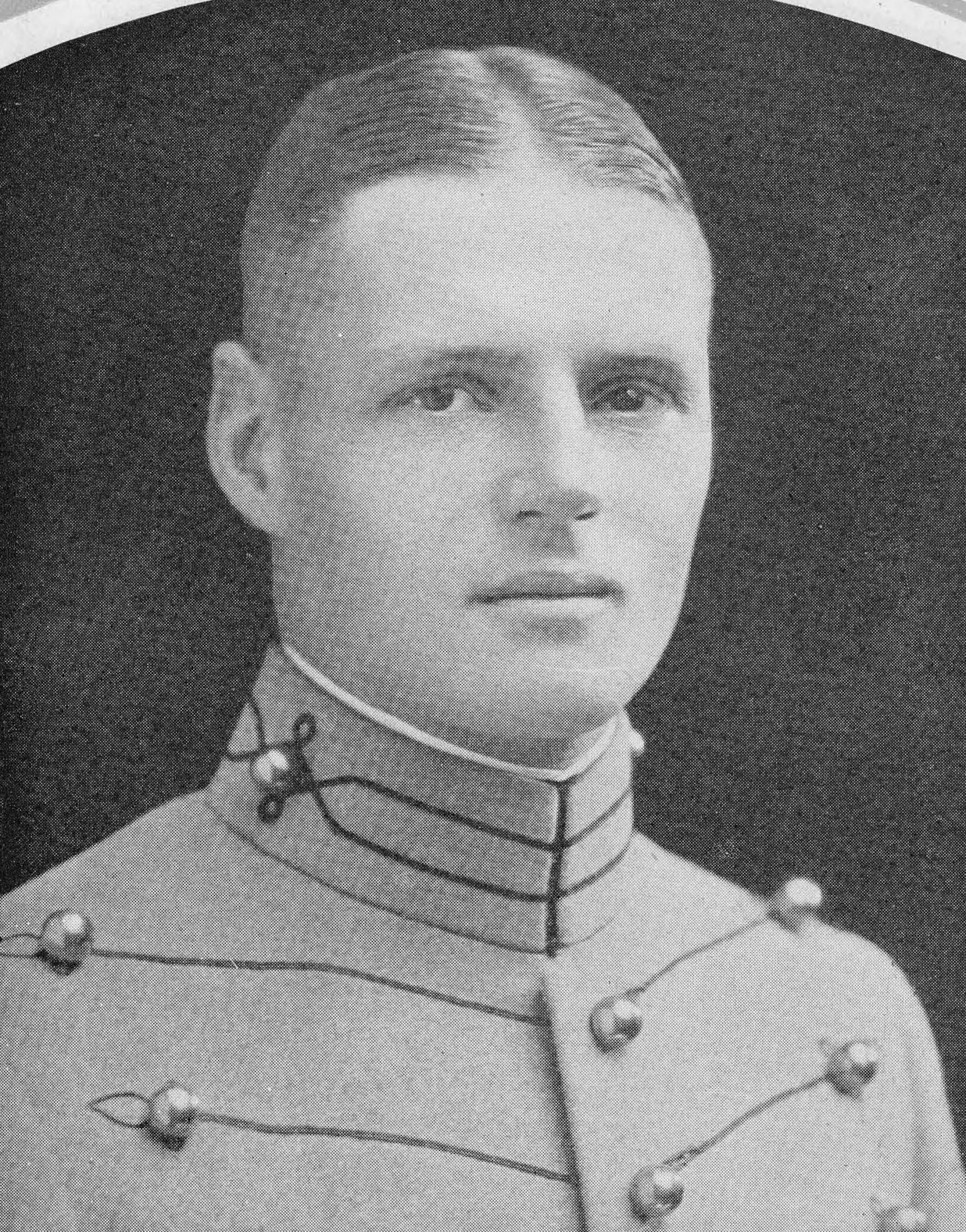
- Farwick at West Point in 1925

Biographical details
- Born: September 22, 1902; Delanco Township, New Jersey, U.S.
- Died: December 10, 1977 (aged 75); Elgin, Illinois, U.S.

Playing career
- 1922–1924: Army
- Position: Guard

Coaching career (HC unless noted)
- 1926: Army (assistant)
- 1932: Arizona

Head coaching record
- Overall: 4–5

Accomplishments and honors

Awards
- First-team All-American (1924)

August William Farwick (September 22, 1902 – December 10, 1977) was an American football player and coach. He served as the head football coach at the University of Arizona in 1932, compiling a record of 4–5.

== Biography ==
August W. Farwick was born on September 22, 1902.

He graduated from the United States Military Academy at West Point in 1925.

He died in Elgin, Illinois on December 10, 1977.

== Head coaching record ==
Year	Team	Overall	Conference	Standing	Bowl/playoffs
Arizona Wildcats (Border Conference) (1932)
1932	Arizona	4–5	3–2	2nd	
Arizona:		4–5	3–2		
Total:		4–5			
