= 1932 California Golden Bears football team =

American college football season

1932 California Golden Bears football
- Conference: Pacific Coast Conference
- Record: 7–3–2 (2–2–1 PCC)
- Head coach: Bill Ingram (2nd season)
- Home stadium: California Memorial Stadium

1932 Pacific Coast Conference football standings
	Conf.					Overall
Team	W		L		T	W		L		T
No. 2 USC $	6	–	0	–	0	10	–	0	–	0
Washington State	5	–	1	–	1	7	–	1	–	1
UCLA	4	–	2	–	0	6	–	4	–	0
Washington	3	–	2	–	2	6	–	2	–	2
Oregon	2	–	2	–	1	6	–	3	–	1
California	2	–	2	–	1	7	–	3	–	2
Stanford	1	–	3	–	1	6	–	4	–	1
Oregon State	1	–	4	–	0	4	–	6	–	0
Idaho	1	–	4	–	0	3	–	5	–	0
Montana	0	–	5	–	0	2	–	7	–	0
$ – Conference champion; Rankings from Dickinson System

The 1932 California Golden Bears football team was an American football team that represented the University of California in the Pacific Coast Conference (PCC) during the 1932 college football season. In its second season under head coach Bill Ingram, the team compiled a 7–3–2 record (2–2–1 in conference), tied for fifth place in the PCC, and outscored its opponents by a total of 169 to 89.

== Schedule ==
Date	Opponent	Site	Result	Attendance	Source
September 17	Cal Aggies*	Memorial Stadium; Berkeley, CA	W 20–6	20,000	
September 17	West Coast Navy*	Memorial Stadium; Berkeley, CA	W 13–0	20,000	
September 24	Santa Clara*	Memorial Stadium; Berkeley, CA	L 0–12	50,000	
October 1	Olympic Club*	Memorial Stadium; Berkeley, CA	W 22–6		
October 8	Saint Mary's*	Memorial Stadium; Berkeley, CA	T 12–12	55,000	
October 15	Washington State	Memorial Stadium; Berkeley, CA	L 2–7	25,000	
October 22	at Washington	Husky Stadium; Seattle, WA	W 7–6	19,173	
October 29	Nevada*	Memorial Stadium; Berkeley, CA	W 38–0	20,000	
November 5	at USC	Los Angeles Memorial Coliseum; Los Angeles, CA	L 7–27	70,000	
November 12	Idaho	Memorial Stadium; Berkeley, CA	W 21–6	8,000	
November 19	Stanford	Memorial Stadium; Berkeley, CA (Big Game)	T 0–0	80,000	
December 17	Georgia Tech*	Memorial Stadium; Berkeley, CA	W 27–6	10,000	
*Non-conference game
