= 1932 Utah State Aggies football team =

American college football season

1932 Utah State Aggies football
- Conference: Rocky Mountain Conference
- Record: 4–4 (3–3 RMC)
- Head coach: Dick Romney (14th season)
- Home stadium: Aggie Stadium

1932 Rocky Mountain Conference football standings
	Conf.					Overall
Team	W		L		T	W		L		T
Utah $	6	–	0	–	0	6	–	1	–	1
BYU	5	–	1	–	0	8	–	1	–	0
Colorado College	5	–	2	–	0	5	–	2	–	0
Denver	4	–	1	–	1	4	–	3	–	1
Colorado Agricultural	4	–	3	–	1	4	–	3	–	1
Colorado Teachers	2	–	2	–	1	4	–	2	–	1
Utah State	3	–	3	–	0	4	–	4	–	0
Colorado	2	–	4	–	0	2	–	4	–	0
Wyoming	1	–	4	–	1	2	–	6	–	1
Colorado Mines	1	–	5	–	0	1	–	7	–	0
Montana State	0	–	3	–	0	3	–	3	–	1
Western State (CO)	0	–	5	–	0	1	–	5	–	0
$ – Conference champion

The 1932 Utah State Aggies football team was an American football team that represented Utah State Agricultural College in the Rocky Mountain Conference (RMC) during the 1932 college football season. In their 14th season under head coach Dick Romney, the Aggies compiled a 4–4 record (3–3 against RMC opponents), finished seventh in the conference, and outscored all opponents by a total of 123 to 105. The team won all four of its home games by a combined score of 110 to 12.

== Schedule ==
Date	Opponent	Site	Result	Attendance	Source
September 24	Idaho State*	Aggie Stadium; Logan, UT	W 32–0		
October 1	Montana State	Aggie Stadium; Logan, UT	W 26–0		
October 8	at Colorado	Colorado Stadium; Boulder, CO	L 7–26		
October 14	Western State (CO)	Aggie Stadium; Logan, UT	W 39–0		
October 29	at Utah	Ute Stadium; Salt Lake City, UT (rivalry)	L 0–16	12,000	
November 11	Colorado Agricultural	Aggie Stadium; Logan, UT	W 13–12		
November 19	at BYU	Provo, UT (rivalry)	L 6–18	6,500	
November 24	at Idaho*	Public School Field; Boise, ID	L 0–33	4,000	
*Non-conference game
