= 1932 Chico State Wildcats football team =

American college football season

1932 Chico State Wildcats football
- Conference: Far Western Conference
- Record: 3–5 (2–1 FWC)
- Head coach: Art Acker (10th season)
- Home stadium: College Field

1932 Far Western Conference football standings
	Conf.					Overall
Team	W		L		T	W		L		T
San Jose State +	3	–	0	–	2	7	–	0	–	2
Nevada +	2	–	0	–	1	3	–	3	–	2
Chico State	2	–	1	–	0	3	–	5	–	0
Pacific (CA)	2	–	2	–	0	4	–	4	–	0
Cal Aggies	1	–	4	–	0	1	–	8	–	1
Fresno State	0	–	3	–	1	3	–	5	–	2
+ – Conference co-champions

The 1932 Chico State Wildcats football team represented Chico State Teachers College—now known as California State University, Chico—as a member of the Far Western Conference (FWC) during the 1932 college football season. Led by 10th-year head coach Art Acker, Chico State compiled an overall record of 3–5 with a mark of 2–1 in conference play, placing third in the FWC. The team outscored its opponents 82 to 75 for the season. The Wildcats played home games at College Field in Chico, California.

== Schedule ==
Date	Time	Opponent	Site	Result	Source
September 24		San Francisco State*	College Field; Chico, CA	W 26–0	
October 1		Menlo*	College Field; Chico, CA	L 6–12	
October 8	2:30 p.m.	at Sacramento*	Sacramento Stadium; Sacramento, CA	L 0–7	
October 15		Oregon Normal*	College Field; Chico, CA	L 0–8	
October 29		at San Jose State	Spartan Field; San Jose, CA	L 7–14	
November 5		Cal Aggies	College Field; Chico, CA	W 16–6	
November 11		at Southern Oregon Normal*	Walter E. Phillips Field?; Ashland, OR	L 7–14	
November 24		Pacific (CA)	College Field; Chico, CA	W 20–14	
*Non-conference game; All times are in Pacific time
