= 1932 Cal Poly Mustangs football team =

American college football season

1932 Cal Poly Mustangs football
- Conference: Independent
- Record: 4–4
- Head coach: Al Agosti (11th season)

1932 Western college football independents records
| | Conf. | | | Overall |
| Team | W | L | T | W | | L | | T |
|---|---|---|---|---|---|---|---|---|
| Columbia (OR) | | – | | 6 | – | 0 | – | 1 |
| Saint Mary's | | – | | 6 | – | 2 | – | 1 |
| Santa Clara | | – | | 6 | – | 3 | – | 0 |
| Gonzaga | | – | | 5 | – | 3 | – | 0 |
| Hawaii | | – | | 2 | – | 1 | – | 1 |
| Cal Poly | | – | | 4 | – | 4 | – | 0 |
| Loyola (CA) | | – | | 4 | – | 4 | – | 0 |
| San Francisco | | – | | 2 | – | 6 | – | 0 |
| Humboldt State | | – | | 1 | – | 4 | – | 0 |
| San Francisco State | | – | | 1 | – | 7 | – | 0 |

The 1932 Cal Poly Mustangs football team represented California Polytechnic School—now known as California Polytechnic State University, San Luis Obispo—as an independent during the 1932 college football season. Led by Al Agosti in his 11th and final season as head coach, Cal Poly compiled a record of 4–4. The team outscored its opponents 117 to 103 for the season. The Mustangs played home games in San Luis Obispo, California.

Agosti finished his tenure at Cal Poly with an overall record of 32–44–5. Cal Poly was a two-year school until 1941 and competed as an independent from 1929 to 1945.

== Schedule ==
| Date | Opponent | Site | Result | Source |
|---|---|---|---|---|
| September 23 | at Bakersfield | Bakersfield, CA | L 0–32 | |
| October 1 | Santa Maria | San Luis Obispo, CA | L 8–13 | |
| October 8 | Moran Junior College (Note: Moran Junior College was founded in 1914 in Bainbridge Island, Washington. A satellite campus was opened in 1928 in Atascadero, California. Records show that the California site fielded football teams from 1929 to 1935. The Washington campus closed in 1935 and the California campus closed shortly thereafter.) | San Luis Obispo, CA | W 38–0 | |
| October 15 | Fresno State freshmen | San Luis Obispo, CA | L 0–21 | |
| October 22 | Taft | San Luis Obispo, CA | W 13–12 | |
| October 29 | at Porterville | Porterville, CA | L 13–19 | |
| November 5 | at Salinas | Salinas, CA | W 25–6 | |
| November 11 | Santa Barbara State freshmen | San Luis Obispo, CA | W 20–0 | |
