= 1932 Texas Tech Matadors football team =

American college football season

1932 Texas Tech Matadors football
- Conference: Border Conference
- Record: 10–2 (2–0 Border)
- Head coach: Pete Cawthon (3rd season)
- Offensive scheme: Single-wing
- Base defense: 6–2
- Captain: Ross Ayers
- Home stadium: Tech Field

1932 Border Conference football standings
	Conf.					Overall
Team	W		L		T	W		L		T
Texas Tech	2	–	0	–	0	10	–	2	–	0
Arizona	3	–	2	–	0	4	–	5	–	0
Arizona State	2	–	2	–	0	4	–	3	–	1
Arizona State–Flagstaff	2	–	2	–	0	3	–	2	–	2
New Mexico A&M	1	–	2	–	1	4	–	5	–	1
New Mexico	1	–	3	–	1	1	–	5	–	1
Arizona State and Arizona State–Flagstaff played twice, but only the second meeting counted in the conference standings.

The 1932 Texas Tech Matadors football team represented Texas Technological College—now known as Texas Tech University—as a member of the Border Conference during the 1932 college football season. In their third season under head coach Pete Cawthon, the Matadors compiled a 10–2 record (2–0 against conference opponents) and outscored opponents by a combined total of 382 to 35. The team played its home games at Tech Field.

== Schedule ==
Date	Opponent	Site	Result	Attendance	Source
September 17	Panhandle A&M*	Tech Field; Lubbock, TX	W 44–0	2,500	
September 24	vs. Texas A&M*	Butler Field; Amarillo, TX (rivalry)	L 0–7	5,000	
October 1	SMU*	Tech Field; Lubbock, TX	W 6–0		
October 7	Austin*	Tech Field; Lubbock, TX	W 64–0	3,300	
October 14	Arizona	Tech Field; Lubbock, TX	W 21–0	3,500	
October 15	at New Mexico Normal*	Las Vegas, NM	W 43–7		
October 22	at Colorado Mines*	DU Stadium; Denver, CO	W 21–0		
October 28	Notre Dame B team*	Tech Field; Lubbock, TX	W 39–0	8,000	
November 4	Trinity (TX)*	Tech Field; Lubbock, TX	W 79–0	4,000	
November 11	Baylor*^{†}	Tech Field; Lubbock, TX (rivalry)	W 14–2	5,000–6,500	
November 19	at New Mexico	University Field; Albuquerque, NM	W 39–6	3,000	
November 24	Simmons (TX)*	Tech Field; Lubbock, TX	L 12–13	4,000	
*Non-conference game; ^{†}Homecoming
