= 1932 Washington State Cougars football team =

American college football season

1932 Washington State Cougars football
- Conference: Pacific Coast Conference
- Record: 7–1–1 (5–1–1 PCC)
- Head coach: Babe Hollingbery (7th season)
- Captain: George Sander
- Home stadium: Rogers Field

1932 Pacific Coast Conference football standings
	Conf.					Overall
Team	W		L		T	W		L		T
No. 2 USC $	6	–	0	–	0	10	–	0	–	0
Washington State	5	–	1	–	1	7	–	1	–	1
UCLA	4	–	2	–	0	6	–	4	–	0
Washington	3	–	2	–	2	6	–	2	–	2
Oregon	2	–	2	–	1	6	–	3	–	1
California	2	–	2	–	1	7	–	3	–	2
Stanford	1	–	3	–	1	6	–	4	–	1
Oregon State	1	–	4	–	0	4	–	6	–	0
Idaho	1	–	4	–	0	3	–	5	–	0
Montana	0	–	5	–	0	2	–	7	–	0
$ – Conference champion; Rankings from Dickinson System

The 1932 Washington State Cougars football team was an American football team that represented Washington State College in the Pacific Coast Conference during the 1932 college football season. In its seventh season under head coach Babe Hollingbery, the team compiled a 7–1–1 record (5–1–1 in PCC, runner-up), shut out six of nine opponents, and outscored all opponents 130 to 28.

Halfback George Sander of Spokane was selected by the Associated Press (AP), United Press (UP), and Newspaper Enterprise Association (NEA) as a first-team player on the All-Coast team. Out of North Central High School, Sander was also selected by the AP and NEA as a second-team halfback, and by the UP as a third-team halfback, on the All-America team.

The Cougars played their four home games on campus at Rogers Field in Pullman, Washington.

== Schedule ==
Date	Opponent	Site	Result	Attendance	Source
September 24	College of Idaho*	Rogers Field; Pullman, WA	W 40–0	4,000	
October 1	at USC	Los Angeles Memorial Coliseum; Los Angeles, CA	L 0–20	35,000	
October 8	Willamette*	Rogers Field; Pullman, WA	W 30–0	3,000	
October 15	at California	California Memorial Stadium; Berkeley, CA	W 7–2	25,000	
October 22	at Oregon State	Bell Field; Corvallis, OR	W 7–6	5,000	
October 29	Montana	Rogers Field; Pullman, WA	W 31–0	3,000	
November 5	Idaho	Rogers Field; Pullman, WA (rivalry)	W 12–0	8,000	
November 12	at Washington	Husky Stadium; Seattle, WA (rivalry)	T 0–0	20,000	
November 24	at UCLA	Los Angeles Memorial Coliseum; Los Angeles, CA (Thanksgiving)	W 3–0	35,000	
*Non-conference game
