= 1932 Utah Utes football team =

American college football season

1932 Utah Utes football

RMC champion
- Conference: Rocky Mountain Conference
- Record: 6–1–1 (6–0 RMC)
- Head coach: Ike Armstrong (8th season)
- Captain: Frank Christensen
- Home stadium: Ute Stadium

1932 Rocky Mountain Conference football standings
	Conf.					Overall
Team	W		L		T	W		L		T
Utah $	6	–	0	–	0	6	–	1	–	1
BYU	5	–	1	–	0	8	–	1	–	0
Colorado College	5	–	2	–	0	5	–	2	–	0
Denver	4	–	1	–	1	4	–	3	–	1
Colorado Agricultural	4	–	3	–	1	4	–	3	–	1
Colorado Teachers	2	–	2	–	1	4	–	2	–	1
Utah State	3	–	3	–	0	4	–	4	–	0
Colorado	2	–	4	–	0	2	–	4	–	0
Wyoming	1	–	4	–	1	2	–	6	–	1
Colorado Mines	1	–	5	–	0	1	–	7	–	0
Montana State	0	–	3	–	0	3	–	3	–	1
Western State (CO)	0	–	5	–	0	1	–	5	–	0
$ – Conference champion

The 1932 Utah Utes football team was an American football team that represented the University of Utah as a member of the Rocky Mountain Conference (RMC) during the 1932 college football season. In their eighth season under head coach Ike Armstrong, the Utes compiled an overall record of 6–1–1 with a mark of 6–0 against conference opponents, winning the RMC title for fifth consecutive season and completing their fourth consecutive year of perfect conference play. Utah outscored all opponents by a total of 162 to 47.

== Schedule ==
Date	Opponent	Site	Result	Attendance	Source
September 24	at USC*	Los Angeles Memorial Coliseum; Los Angeles, CA	L 0–35	35,000	
October 1	Colorado College	Ute Stadium; Salt Lake City, UT	W 54–6		
October 8	vs. Nevada*	Ogden Stadium; Ogden, UT	T 6–6	3,500	
October 15	BYU	Ute Stadium; Salt Lake City, UT (rivalry)	W 29–0	> 15,000	
October 29	Utah State^{†}	Ute Stadium; Salt Lake City, UT (rivalry)	W 16–0	12,000	
November 5	at Colorado	Colorado Stadium; Boulder, CO (rivalry)	W 14–0		
November 12	Denver	Ute Stadium; Salt Lake City, UT	W 27–0		
November 19	at Colorado Agricultural	Colorado Field; Fort Collins, CO	W 16–0		
*Non-conference game; ^{†}Homecoming
