= 1932 Oregon Webfoots football team =

American college football season

1932 Oregon Webfoots football
- Conference: Pacific Coast Conference
- Record: 6–3–1 (2–2–1 PCC)
- Head coach: Prink Callison (1st season)
- Captain: Bill Morgan
- Home stadium: Hayward Field

1932 Pacific Coast Conference football standings
	Conf.					Overall
Team	W		L		T	W		L		T
No. 2 USC $	6	–	0	–	0	10	–	0	–	0
Washington State	5	–	1	–	1	7	–	1	–	1
UCLA	4	–	2	–	0	6	–	4	–	0
Washington	3	–	2	–	2	6	–	2	–	2
Oregon	2	–	2	–	1	6	–	3	–	1
California	2	–	2	–	1	7	–	3	–	2
Stanford	1	–	3	–	1	6	–	4	–	1
Oregon State	1	–	4	–	0	4	–	6	–	0
Idaho	1	–	4	–	0	3	–	5	–	0
Montana	0	–	5	–	0	2	–	7	–	0
$ – Conference champion; Rankings from Dickinson System

The 1932 Oregon Webfoots football team was an American football team that represented the University of Oregon in the Pacific Coast Conference (PCC) during the 1932 college football season. In their first season under head coach Prink Callison, the Webfoots compiled a 6–3–1 record (2–2–1 against PCC opponents), finished in a tie for fifth place in the PCC, and outscored their opponents, 109 to 64. The team played its home games at Hayward Field in Eugene, Oregon. Tackle Bill Morgan was the team captain.

== Schedule ==
Date	Opponent	Site	Result	Attendance	Source
September 23	Pacific (OR)*	Hayward Field; Eugene, OR	W 26–6		
October 1	Santa Clara*	Hayward Field; Eugene, OR	W 7–0		
October 8	vs. Washington	Multnomah Stadium; Portland, OR (rivalry)	T 0–0	32,000	
October 15	vs. UCLA	Multnomah Stadium; Portland, OR	L 7–12	12,000	
October 22	at Idaho	MacLean Field; Moscow, ID	W 32–0		
October 29	Gonzaga*	Hayward Field; Eugene, OR	W 13–0		
November 5	at Oregon State	Bell Field; Corvallis, OR (rivalry)	W 12–6		
November 12	at USC	Los Angeles Memorial Coliseum; Los Angeles, CA	L 0–33	40,000	
November 24	at Saint Mary's*	Kezar Stadium; San Francisco, CA (Governors' Trophy Game)	L 0–7		
December 17	at LSU*	Tiger Stadium; Baton Rouge, LA	W 12–0	1,200	
*Non-conference game; Source:
