= 1932 UCLA Bruins football team =

American college football season

1932 UCLA Bruins football
- Conference: Pacific Coast Conference
- Record: 6–4 (4–2 PCC)
- Head coach: William H. Spaulding (8th season)
- Home stadium: Los Angeles Memorial Coliseum

1932 Pacific Coast Conference football standings
	Conf.					Overall
Team	W		L		T	W		L		T
No. 2 USC $	6	–	0	–	0	10	–	0	–	0
Washington State	5	–	1	–	1	7	–	1	–	1
UCLA	4	–	2	–	0	6	–	4	–	0
Washington	3	–	2	–	2	6	–	2	–	2
Oregon	2	–	2	–	1	6	–	3	–	1
California	2	–	2	–	1	7	–	3	–	2
Stanford	1	–	3	–	1	6	–	4	–	1
Oregon State	1	–	4	–	0	4	–	6	–	0
Idaho	1	–	4	–	0	3	–	5	–	0
Montana	0	–	5	–	0	2	–	7	–	0
$ – Conference champion; Rankings from Dickinson System

The 1932 UCLA Bruins football team was an American football team that represented the University of California, Los Angeles in the Pacific Coast Conference (PCC) during the 1932 college football season. In their eighth year under head coach William H. Spaulding, the Bruins compiled a 6–4 record (4–2 conference), finished third in the PCC, and outscored opponents by a total of 149 to 61. They had finished in the ninth place in the previous season.

== Schedule ==
Date	Opponent	Site	Result	Attendance	Source
September 23	Cal Aggies*	Los Angeles Memorial Coliseum; Los Angeles, CA	W 26–0	5,000	
September 30	Idaho	Los Angeles Memorial Coliseum; Los Angeles, CA	W 6–0	3,000	
October 15	at Oregon	Multnomah Stadium; Portland, OR	W 12–7	10,000	
October 22	Caltech*	Los Angeles Memorial Coliseum; Los Angeles, CA	W 51–0	16,636	
October 29	Stanford	Los Angeles Memorial Coliseum; Los Angeles, CA	W 13–6	45,000	
November 11	Saint Mary's*	Los Angeles Memorial Coliseum; Los Angeles, CA	L 7–14	70,000	
November 19	Montana	Los Angeles Memorial Coliseum; Los Angeles, CA	W 32–0	11,000	
November 24	Washington State	Los Angeles Memorial Coliseum; Los Angeles, CA	L 0–3	35,000	
December 3	Washington	Los Angeles Memorial Coliseum; Los Angeles, CA	L 0–19	25,000	
December 17	at Florida*	Florida Field; Gainesville, FL	L 2–12	10,000	
*Non-conference game
