= 1932 Arizona Wildcats football team =

American college football season

1932 Arizona Wildcats football
- Conference: Border Conference
- Record: 4–5 (3–2 Border)
- Head coach: August W. Farwick (1st season)
- Captain: Bill Davies
- Home stadium: Arizona Stadium

1932 Border Conference football standings
	Conf.					Overall
Team	W		L		T	W		L		T
Texas Tech	2	–	0	–	0	10	–	2	–	0
Arizona	3	–	2	–	0	4	–	5	–	0
Arizona State	2	–	2	–	0	4	–	3	–	1
Arizona State–Flagstaff	2	–	2	–	0	3	–	2	–	2
New Mexico A&M	1	–	2	–	1	4	–	5	–	1
New Mexico	1	–	3	–	1	1	–	5	–	1
Arizona State and Arizona State–Flagstaff played twice, but only the second meeting counted in the conference standings.

The 1932 Arizona Wildcats football team represented the University of Arizona in the Border Conference during the 1932 college football season. In their first and only season under head coach August W. Farwick, the Wildcats compiled a 4–5 record (7–6 against Border opponents), finished in second place in the conference, and were outscored by their opponents, 106 to 82. The team captain was Bill Davies. The team played its home games at Arizona Stadium in Tucson, Arizona.

== Schedule ==
Date	Opponent	Site	Result	Attendance	Source
September 23	at Occidental*	Rose Bowl; Pasadena, CA	W 19–0		
October 1	Loyola (CA)*	Arizona Stadium; Tucson, AZ	L 6–33		
October 7	New Mexico A&M	Arizona Stadium; Tucson, AZ	W 12–7		
October 14	at Texas Tech	Tech Field; Lubbock, TX	L 0–21	3,500	
October 21	Arizona State	Arizona Stadium; Tucson, AZ (rivalry)	W 20–6		
October 29	vs. Arizona State–Flagstaff	Montgomery Stadium; Phoenix, AZ	L 6–7	2,500	
November 11	New Mexico	Arizona Stadium; Tucson, AZ (rivalry)	W 13–6		
November 19	at San Diego State*	Balboa Stadium; San Diego, CA	L 0–13	2,000	
November 24	Oklahoma A&M*	Arizona Stadium; Tucson, AZ	L 6–13		
*Non-conference game
