= Howie Tipton =

American football player (1911–1966)

Profile
- Positions: Guard, back, end

Personal information
- Born: April 19, 1911; Los Angeles
- Died: March 19, 1966 (aged 54); Ontario, California
- Listed height: 5 ft 11 in (1.80 m)
- Listed weight: 186 lb (84 kg)

Career information
- High school: Belmont (CA)
- College: USC

Career history
- Chicago Cardinals (1933–1937)

Career statistics
- Rushing yards: 79
- Receiving yards: 123

Howard Durward Tipton (April 19, 1911 – March 19, 1966) was an American football player.

Tipton was born in 1911 in Los Angeles and attended Belmont High School.

He attended the University of Southern California and played college football for the USC Trojans from 1929 to 1932. At USC, he saw limited action as a halfback and did not letter through his junior year. As a senior, he was moved to the running guard and defensive back positions where he saw regular playing time on the 1932 USC Trojans football team that compiled a perfect 10–0 and won the national championship.

He played professional football in the National Football League (NFL) as a guard, back, and end for the Chicago Cardinals from 1933 to 1937. He earned a reputation as one of the NFL's greatest guards. He appeared in 51 NFL games, 31 as a starter. He scored a touchdown during the 1944 season.

He later played for the Los Angeles Bulldogs from 1938 to 1941, the Hollywood Bears in 1942, and the Los Angeles Wildcats in 1944.

In later years, Tipton worked for Kaiser Steel. He died in 1966 at age 54 in Ontario, California.
