= 1932 New Mexico A&M Aggies football team =

American college football season

1932 New Mexico A&M Aggies football
- Conference: Border Conference
- Record: 4–5–1 (1–2–1 Border)
- Head coach: Jerry Hines (4th season)
- Home stadium: Miller Field

1932 Border Conference football standings
	Conf.					Overall
Team	W		L		T	W		L		T
Texas Tech	2	–	0	–	0	10	–	2	–	0
Arizona	3	–	2	–	0	4	–	5	–	0
Arizona State	2	–	2	–	0	4	–	3	–	1
Arizona State–Flagstaff	2	–	2	–	0	3	–	2	–	2
New Mexico A&M	1	–	2	–	1	4	–	5	–	1
New Mexico	1	–	3	–	1	1	–	5	–	1
Arizona State and Arizona State–Flagstaff played twice, but only the second meeting counted in the conference standings.

The 1932 New Mexico A&M Aggies football team was an American football team that represented New Mexico College of Agriculture and Mechanical Arts (now known as New Mexico State University) as a member of the Border Conference during the 1932 college football season. In its fourth year under head coach Jerry Hines, the team compiled a 4–5–1 record (1–2–1 against conference opponents), finished fifth in the conference, and outscored opponents by a total of 252 to 88.

== Schedule ==
Date	Opponent	Site	Result	Attendance	Source
September 24	El Paso National Guard*	Miller Field; Las Cruces, NM	W 66–0		
October 1	at San Diego Marines*	Navy Field; San Diego, CA	L 0–12		
October 7	at Arizona	Arizona Stadium; Tucson, AZ	L 7–12		
October 14	New Mexico Mines*	Miller Field; Las Cruces, NM	W 108–0		
October 22	at New Mexico	University Field; Albuquerque, NM (rivalry)	T 7–7		
October 29	Texas Mines*	Miller Field; Las Cruces, NM (rivalry)	L 6–31	2,500	
November 5	Arizona State	Miller Field; Las Cruces, NM	L 6–7		
November 11	Arizona State–Flagstaff^{†}	Miller Field; Las Cruces, NM	W 7–0		
November 18	New Mexico Normal*	Miller Field; Las Cruces, NM	W 39–0		
November 24	at New Mexico Military*	Roswell, NM	L 6–19		
*Non-conference game; ^{†}Homecoming
