= 1932 New Mexico Lobos football team =

American college football season

1932 New Mexico Lobos football
- Conference: Border Conference
- Record: 1–6–1 (1–3–1 Border)
- Head coach: Chuck Riley (2nd season)
- Captain: Orie McGuire
- Home stadium: University Field

1932 Border Conference football standings
	Conf.					Overall
Team	W		L		T	W		L		T
Texas Tech	2	–	0	–	0	10	–	2	–	0
Arizona	3	–	2	–	0	4	–	5	–	0
Arizona State	2	–	2	–	0	4	–	3	–	1
Arizona State–Flagstaff	2	–	2	–	0	3	–	2	–	2
New Mexico A&M	1	–	2	–	1	4	–	5	–	1
New Mexico	1	–	3	–	1	1	–	5	–	1
Arizona State and Arizona State–Flagstaff played twice, but only the second meeting counted in the conference standings.

The 1932 New Mexico Lobos football team represented the University of New Mexico as a member of the Border Conference during the 1932 college football season. In their second season under head coach Chuck Riley, the Lobos compiled an overall record of 1–6–1 record with a mark of 1–3–1 against conference opponents, finished last out of six teams in the Border Conference, and were outscored by a total of 191 to 31. Orie McGuire was the team captain.

== Schedule ==
Date	Opponent	Site	Result	Attendance	Source
October 8	Arizona State–Flagstaff	University Field; Albuquerque, NM	W 6–0		
October 15	at Colorado Teachers*	Jackson Field; Greeley, CO	L 6–30		
October 22	New Mexico A&M^{†}	University Field; Albuquerque, NM (rivalry)	T 7–7		
October 29	at New Mexico Military*	Roswell, NM	L 0–7	3,500	
November 4	at Loyola (CA)*	Wrigley Field; Los Angeles, CA	L 0–52		
November 11	at Arizona	Arizona Stadium; Tucson, AZ (rivalry)	L 6–13		
November 19	Texas Tech	University Field; Albuquerque, NM	L 6–39	3,000	
December 3	at Arizona State	Irish Field; Tempe, AZ	L 0–43		
*Non-conference game; ^{†}Homecoming
