= 1932 Idaho Vandals football team =

American college football season

1932 Idaho Vandals football
- Conference: Pacific Coast Conference
- Record: 3–5 (1–4 PCC)
- Head coach: Leo Calland (4th season)
- Home stadium: MacLean Field

1932 Pacific Coast Conference football standings
| | Conf. | | | | | Overall |
| Team | W | | L | | T | W | | L | | T |
|---|---|---|---|---|---|---|---|---|---|---|
| No. 2 USC $ | 6 | – | 0 | – | 0 | 10 | – | 0 | – | 0 |
| Washington State | 5 | – | 1 | – | 1 | 7 | – | 1 | – | 1 |
| UCLA | 4 | – | 2 | – | 0 | 6 | – | 4 | – | 0 |
| Washington | 3 | – | 2 | – | 2 | 6 | – | 2 | – | 2 |
| Oregon | 2 | – | 2 | – | 1 | 6 | – | 3 | – | 1 |
| California | 2 | – | 2 | – | 1 | 7 | – | 3 | – | 2 |
| Stanford | 1 | – | 3 | – | 1 | 6 | – | 4 | – | 1 |
| Oregon State | 1 | – | 4 | – | 0 | 4 | – | 6 | – | 0 |
| Idaho | 1 | – | 4 | – | 0 | 3 | – | 5 | – | 0 |
| Montana | 0 | – | 5 | – | 0 | 2 | – | 7 | – | 0 |
$ – Conference champion; Rankings from Dickinson System

The 1932 Idaho Vandals football team represented the University of Idaho in the 1932 college football season. The Vandals were led by fourth-year head coach Leo Calland, and were members of the Pacific Coast Conference. Two home games were played on campus in Moscow at MacLean Field, with one in Boise at Public School Field.

Idaho compiled a 3–5 overall record and lost all but one of its five games in the PCC. The Vandals were led on the field by undersized junior quarterback Wee Willie Smith, then known as "Little Giant" Willis Smith of Boise. Two years later in 1934, he was a backup in the NFL with the New York Giants in their championship season.

Idaho played a night game in Los Angeles against UCLA on Friday, September 30; rain caused light attendance and a low score. It was part of a Palouse–Los Angeles doubleheader in the Memorial Coliseum that weekend; USC hosted Washington State on Saturday afternoon. The stadium was the prime venue of the Summer Olympics less than two months earlier.

In the Battle of the Palouse with neighbor Washington State, the Vandals suffered a fifth straight loss, falling 0–12 at Rogers Field in Pullman on November 5. Idaho's most recent win in the series was seven years earlier in 1925 and the next was 22 years away in 1954. For fans from Spokane, a special Northern Pacific train transported fans to Pullman; the round trip fare was two dollars.

== Schedule ==
| Date | Opponent | Site | Result | Attendance | Source |
|---|---|---|---|---|---|
| September 24 | Whitman* | MacLean Field; Moscow, ID | W 49–0 | | |
| September 30 | at UCLA | Los Angeles Memorial Coliseum; Los Angeles, CA | L 0–6 | 3,000 | |
| October 8 | at Gonzaga* | Gonzaga Stadium; Spokane, WA (rivalry) | L 7–20 | 9,000 | |
| October 15 | at Montana | Dornblaser Field; Missoula, MT (rivalry) | W 19–6 | | |
| October 22 | Oregon^{†} | MacLean Field; Moscow, ID | L 0–32 | 8,000 | |
| November 5 | at Washington State | Rogers Field; Pullman, WA (Battle of the Palouse) | L 0–12 | 8,000 | |
| November 12 | at California | California Memorial Stadium; Berkeley, CA | L 6–21 | 8,000 | |
| November 24 | vs. Utah State* | Public School Field; Boise, ID | W 33–0 | 4,000 | |
*Non-conference game; ^{†}Homecoming

== All-conference ==
No Vandals were named to the All-Coast teams (Associated Press); junior quarterback Willis Smith was an NEA second team selection.
