= 1932 San Diego State Aztecs football team =

American college football season

1932 San Diego State Aztecs football
- Conference: Southern California Conference
- Record: 3–5–1 (2–4–1 SCC)
- Head coach: Walter Herreid (3rd season)
- Home stadium: Balboa Stadium

1932 Southern California Conference football standings
	Conf.					Overall
Team	W		L		T	W		L		T
Whittier $	5	–	1	–	0	10	–	1	–	0
Redlands	5	–	2	–	0	7	–	2	–	0
La Verne	5	–	2	–	0	6	–	2	–	0
Occidental	4	–	2	–	1	4	–	4	–	1
Pomona	2	–	4	–	0	2	–	4	–	0
San Diego State	2	–	4	–	1	3	–	5	–	1
Caltech	2	–	5	–	0	2	–	7	–	0
Santa Barbara State	1	–	6	–	0	1	–	6	–	0
$ – Conference champion

The 1932 San Diego State Aztecs football team represented San Diego State Teachers College (Note: San Diego State University was known as San Diego State Teachers College from 1924 to 1934.) as a member of the Southern California Conference (SCC) during the 1932 college football season. Led by third-year head coach Walter Herreid, the Aztecs compiled an overall record of 3–5–1 with a mark of in conference play, placing sixth in the SCC. The team outscored its opponents 80–72 points for the season. San Diego State played home games at Balboa Stadium in San Diego.

== Schedule ==
Date	Opponent	Site	Result	Attendance	Source
September 23	Santa Barbara State	Balboa Stadium; San Diego, CA	L 2–6		
October 1	at Pomona	Claremont Alumni Field; Claremont, CA	W 13–0		
October 8	La Verne	Balboa Stadium; San Diego, CA	L 12–15		
October 22	Occidental	Balboa Stadium; San Diego, CA	T 0–0	4,000	
October 28	at Redlands	Redlands Stadium (Note: This stadium is the predecessor to the current Ted Runner Stadium on the University of Redlands campus, which was opened for the 1968 season); Redlands, CA	L 6–19		
November 5	Whittier	Balboa Stadium; San Diego, CA	L 14–18		
November 11	San Diego Marines (Note: The Marine Corps Recruit Depot (MCRD) in San Diego fielded a team that played against colleges and other military teams from 1922 to 1964.)*	Balboa Stadium; San Diego, CA	L 0–14	8,000	
November 19	Arizona*	Balboa Stadium; San Diego, CA	W 13–0	2,000	
November 26	Caltech	Balboa Stadium; San Diego, CA	W 20–0		
*Non-conference game
