= 1932 Oregon State Beavers football team =

American college football season

1932 Oregon State Beavers football
- Conference: Pacific Coast Conference
- Record: 4–6 (1–4 PCC)
- Head coach: Paul J. Schissler (9th season)
- Captain: None
- Home stadium: Bell Field

1932 Pacific Coast Conference football standings
	Conf.					Overall
Team	W		L		T	W		L		T
No. 2 USC $	6	–	0	–	0	10	–	0	–	0
Washington State	5	–	1	–	1	7	–	1	–	1
UCLA	4	–	2	–	0	6	–	4	–	0
Washington	3	–	2	–	2	6	–	2	–	2
Oregon	2	–	2	–	1	6	–	3	–	1
California	2	–	2	–	1	7	–	3	–	2
Stanford	1	–	3	–	1	6	–	4	–	1
Oregon State	1	–	4	–	0	4	–	6	–	0
Idaho	1	–	4	–	0	3	–	5	–	0
Montana	0	–	5	–	0	2	–	7	–	0
$ – Conference champion; Rankings from Dickinson System

The 1932 Oregon State Beavers football team was an American football team that represented Oregon State College in the Pacific Coast Conference (PCC) during the 1932 college football season. In their ninth and final season under head coach Paul J. Schissler, the Beavers compiled a 4–6 record (1–4 against PCC opponents), finished in eighth place in the PCC, and outscored their opponents, 130 to 109. The school finished the year ranked #89 nationally.

Under Coach Schissler, from 1925 to 1932, no team captains were elected. The team played its home games at Bell Field in Corvallis, Oregon and Multnomah Stadium in Portland.

On January 10, 1933, Paul Schissler resigned as Oregon State's football coach. The resignation followed a request by administrators for a reduction in his $8,000 per year salary. In nine years as Oregon State's head coach, Schissler compiled a 48–30–2 record.

== Schedule ==
Date	Opponent	Site	Result	Attendance	Source
September 17	at Gonzaga*	Gonzaga Stadium; Spokane, WA	W 19–16		
September 24	Willamette*	Bell Field; Corvallis, OR	W 32–0		
October 1	Stanford	Multnomah Stadium; Portland, OR	L 0–27	15,000	
October 8	at USC	Los Angeles Memorial Coliseum; Los Angeles, CA	L 0–10	40,000	
October 22	Washington State	Bell Field; Corvallis, OR	L 6–7	5,000	
October 28	West Coast Army*	Bell Field; Corvallis, OR	W 20–9		
November 5	Oregon	Bell Field; Corvallis, OR	L 6–12		
November 12	at Montana	Dornblaser Field; Missoula, MT	W 35–6		
November 19	at Fordham*	Polo Grounds; New York, NY	L 6–8	5,000	
November 24	at Detroit*	University of Detroit Stadium; Detroit, MI	L 6–14	12,000	
*Non-conference game
