= 1932 Arizona State Bulldogs football team =

American college football season

1932 Arizona State Bulldogs football
- Conference: Border Conference
- Record: 4–3–1 (2–2 Border)
- Head coach: Ted Shipkey (3rd season)
- Captain: Paul Griffin
- Home stadium: Irish Field

1932 Border Conference football standings
	Conf.					Overall
Team	W		L		T	W		L		T
Texas Tech	2	–	0	–	0	10	–	2	–	0
Arizona	3	–	2	–	0	4	–	5	–	0
Arizona State	2	–	2	–	0	4	–	3	–	1
Arizona State–Flagstaff	2	–	2	–	0	3	–	2	–	2
New Mexico A&M	1	–	2	–	1	4	–	5	–	1
New Mexico	1	–	3	–	1	1	–	5	–	1
Arizona State and Arizona State–Flagstaff played twice, but only the second meeting counted in the conference standings.

The 1932 Arizona State Bulldogs football team was an American football team that represented Arizona State Teachers College (later renamed Arizona State University) in the Border Conference during the 1932 college football season. In their third and final season under head coach Ted Shipkey, the Bulldogs compiled an overall record of 4–3–1 record with a mark of 2–2 in conference play, tying for third place in the Border Conference, and outscored opponents 182 to 92. The team captain was guard Paul Griffin. The Bulldogs finished 3–2 at home and 1–1–1 on the road. Home games were played at Irish Field in Tempe, Arizona.

== Schedule ==
Date	Opponent	Site	Result
October 1	Casa Blanca Indians*	Irish Field; Tempe, AZ	W 99–0
October 8	Whittier*	Irish Field; Tempe, AZ	L 0–26
October 15	at Arizona State–Flagstaff (Note: The first game between Arizona State and Arizona State–Flagstaff did not count in the Border Conference standings.)*	Skidmore Field; Flagstaff, AZ	T 6–6
October 22	at Arizona	Arizona Stadium; Tucson, AZ (Territorial Cup)	L 6–20
November 5	at New Mexico A&M	Miller Field; Las Cruces, NM	W 7–6
November 12	Texas Mines*	Irish Field; Tempe, AZ	W 15–14
November 19	Arizona State–Flagstaff	Irish Field; Tempe, AZ	L 6–20
December 3	New Mexico	Irish Field; Tempe, AZ	W 43–0
*Non-conference game

== Game summaries ==
On September 24, Arizona State opened its season with a 99–0 victory over the Casa Blanca Indians at Irish Field.

On October 1, the team lost to the Whittier College Poets, 26-0, at Irish Field. It was the first meeting between the two football programs.

On October 15, the Bulldogs played to a 6-6 tie with Arizona State Teachers College at Flagstaff ("Flagstaff", later renamed Northern Arizona University) before a homecoming crowd in Flagstaff.

On Friday night, October 21, Arizona defeated Arizona State, 20-6, in their annual rivalry game played in Tucson.

On November 5, the Bulldogs defeated New Mexico A&M (later renamed New Mexico State University) in a 7-6 road victory in Las Cruces, New Mexico.

On Friday, November 11, Arizona State defeated College of Mines and Metallurgy of the University of Texas (later renamed University of Texas at El Paso) by a 15-14 score in Tempe.

On Thursday, November 24 (Thanksgiving Day), Arizona State lost to Flagstaff, 20-6, at Irish Field in Tempe.

On December 3, the Bulldogs closed their season with an impressive 43-0 home shutout victory over New Mexico. It was the first meeting between the two football programs.

== Roster ==
The usual Arizona State lineup included left end Landon Hardesty, left tackle Anson Cooper, left guard Clarence Sexton, center Reid Calicoat, right guard Paul Griffin, right tackle Don Pace, right end Vernon Tuckey, quarterback Cyrus Morris, halfbacks Norris Steverson and Park Schuler, and fullback Voman Fry.

Bill Baxter and Bill Boyle were also on the roster.
