= 1932 Nevada Wolf Pack football team =

American college football season

1932 Nevada Wolf Pack football

FWC co–champion
- Conference: Far Western Conference
- Record: 3–3–2 (2–0–1 FWC)
- Head coach: Brick Mitchell (1st season)
- Home stadium: Mackay Field

1932 Far Western Conference football standings
	Conf.					Overall
Team	W		L		T	W		L		T
San Jose State +	3	–	0	–	2	7	–	0	–	2
Nevada +	2	–	0	–	1	3	–	3	–	2
Chico State	2	–	1	–	0	3	–	5	–	0
Pacific (CA)	2	–	2	–	0	4	–	4	–	0
Cal Aggies	1	–	4	–	0	1	–	8	–	1
Fresno State	0	–	3	–	1	3	–	5	–	2
+ – Conference co-champions

The 1932 Nevada Wolf Pack football team was an American football team that represented the University of Nevada in the Far Western Conference (FWC) during the 1932 college football season. In their first season under head coach Brick Mitchell, the Wolf Pack compiled a 3–3–2 record (2–0–1 against conference opponents), was outscored by opponents by a total of 99 to 41 and was the conference co-champion.

== Schedule ==
Date	Opponent	Site	Result	Attendance	Source
September 24	Oregon Normal*	Mackay Field; Reno, NV	W 12–7	3,500	
October 1	at Saint Mary's*	Kezar Stadium; San Francisco, CA	L 0–35	< 5,000	
October 8	vs. Utah*	Ogden Stadium; Ogden, UT	T 6–6	3,500	
October 22	Cal Aggies^{†}	Mackay Field; Reno, NV	W 16–0	4,000	
October 29	at California*	California Memorial Stadium; Berkeley, CA	L 0–38	20,000	
November 5	at San Jose State	Spartan Field; San Jose, CA	T 0–0	30,000	
November 11	Olympic Club*	Mackay Field; Reno, NV	L 0–13	3,000	
November 24	at Fresno State	Fresno State College Stadium; Fresno, CA	W 7–0	5,000	
*Non-conference game; ^{†}Homecoming
