= 1932 Colorado Silver and Gold football team =

American college football season

1932 Colorado Silver and Gold football
- Conference: Rocky Mountain Conference
- Record: 2–4 (2–4 RMC)
- Head coach: Bill Saunders (1st season)
- Captain: Game captains
- Home stadium: Colorado Stadium

1932 Rocky Mountain Conference football standings
	Conf.					Overall
Team	W		L		T	W		L		T
Utah $	6	–	0	–	0	6	–	1	–	1
BYU	5	–	1	–	0	8	–	1	–	0
Colorado College	5	–	2	–	0	5	–	2	–	0
Denver	4	–	1	–	1	4	–	3	–	1
Colorado Agricultural	4	–	3	–	1	4	–	3	–	1
Colorado Teachers	2	–	2	–	1	4	–	2	–	1
Utah State	3	–	3	–	0	4	–	4	–	0
Colorado	2	–	4	–	0	2	–	4	–	0
Wyoming	1	–	4	–	1	2	–	6	–	1
Colorado Mines	1	–	5	–	0	1	–	7	–	0
Montana State	0	–	3	–	0	3	–	3	–	1
Western State (CO)	0	–	5	–	0	1	–	5	–	0
$ – Conference champion

The 1932 Colorado Silver and Gold football team was an American football team that represented the University of Colorado as a member of the Rocky Mountain Conference (RMC) during the 1932 college football season. Led by first-year head coach Head coach Bill Saunders, Colorado compiled an overall record of 2–4 with an identical mark in conference play, placing eighth in the RMC.

== Schedule ==
Date	Opponent	Site	Result	Source
October 1	at Colorado Mines	Brooks Field; Golden, CO	W 31–0	
October 8	Utah State	Colorado Stadium; Boulder, CO	W 26–7	
October 22	Colorado Agricultural	Colorado Stadium; Boulder, CO (rivalry)	L 6–7	
November 5	Utah^{†}	Colorado Stadium; Boulder, CO (rivalry)	L 0–14	
November 12	at Colorado College	Washburn Field; Colorado Springs, CO	L 0–12	
November 24	at Denver	Hilltop Stadium; Denver, CO	L 0–6	
^{†}Homecoming
