= 1932 San Jose State Spartans football team =

American college football season

1932 San Jose State Spartans football

FWC co-champion
- Conference: Far Western Conference
- Record: 7–0–2 (3–0–2 FWC)
- Head coach: Dudley DeGroot (1st season)
- Home stadium: Spartan Field

1932 Far Western Conference football standings
	Conf.					Overall
Team	W		L		T	W		L		T
San Jose State +	3	–	0	–	2	7	–	0	–	2
Nevada +	2	–	0	–	1	3	–	3	–	2
Chico State	2	–	1	–	0	3	–	5	–	0
Pacific (CA)	2	–	2	–	0	4	–	4	–	0
Cal Aggies	1	–	4	–	0	1	–	8	–	1
Fresno State	0	–	3	–	1	3	–	5	–	2
+ – Conference co-champions

The 1932 San Jose State Spartans football team represented State Teachers College at San Jose (Note: San Jose State University was known as State Teachers College at San Jose from 1921 to 1934.) during the 1932 college football season.

San Jose State competed in the Far Western Conference (FWC). (Note: The Northern California Athletic Conference (NCAC) was known as the Far Western Conference (FWC) from its founding in 1925 to 1982.) The team was led by first-year head coach Dudley DeGroot, and they played home games at Spartan Field in San Jose, California. The team finished the season undefeated and as co-champions of the FWC with a record of seven wins, no losses and two ties (7–0–2, 3–0–2 FWC). The Spartans outscored their opponents 116–27 for the season, with no team scoring more than a touchdown against the Spartans.

== Schedule ==
Date	Opponent	Site	Result	Attendance	Source
October 1	San Francisco State*	Spartan Field; San Jose, CA	W 19–0		
October 7	at Pacific (CA)	Baxter Stadium; Stockton, CA (rivalry)	W 7–0		
October 15	Sacramento*	Spartan Field; San Jose, CA	W 13–6		
October 22	Fresno State	Spartan Field; San Jose, CA (rivalry)	T 0–0		
October 29	Chico State	Spartan Field; San Jose, CA	W 14–7		
November 5	Nevada	Spartan Stadium; San Jose, CA	T 0–0	30,000	
November 11	Marin*	Spartan Field; San Jose, CA	W 24–7		
November 19	Cal Aggies	Spartan Field; San Jose, CA	W 19–7		
November 26	Weber*	Spartan Field; San Jose, CA	W 20–0		
*Non-conference game
