= 1932 Stanford Indians football team =

American college football season

1932 Stanford Indians football
- Conference: Pacific Coast Conference
- Record: 6–4–1 (1–3–1 PCC)
- Head coach: Pop Warner (9th season)
- Offensive scheme: Double-wing
- Home stadium: Stanford Stadium

1932 Pacific Coast Conference football standings
| | Conf. | | | | | Overall |
| Team | W | | L | | T | W | | L | | T |
|---|---|---|---|---|---|---|---|---|---|---|
| No. 2 USC $ | 6 | – | 0 | – | 0 | 10 | – | 0 | – | 0 |
| Washington State | 5 | – | 1 | – | 1 | 7 | – | 1 | – | 1 |
| UCLA | 4 | – | 2 | – | 0 | 6 | – | 4 | – | 0 |
| Washington | 3 | – | 2 | – | 2 | 6 | – | 2 | – | 2 |
| Oregon | 2 | – | 2 | – | 1 | 6 | – | 3 | – | 1 |
| California | 2 | – | 2 | – | 1 | 7 | – | 3 | – | 2 |
| Stanford | 1 | – | 3 | – | 1 | 6 | – | 4 | – | 1 |
| Oregon State | 1 | – | 4 | – | 0 | 4 | – | 6 | – | 0 |
| Idaho | 1 | – | 4 | – | 0 | 3 | – | 5 | – | 0 |
| Montana | 0 | – | 5 | – | 0 | 2 | – | 7 | – | 0 |
$ – Conference champion; Rankings from Dickinson System

The 1932 Stanford Indians football team was an American football team that represented Stanford University in the Pacific Coast Conference (PCC) during the 1932 college football season. In its ninth and final season under head coach Pop Warner, the team compiled a 6–4–1 record (1–3–1 against conference opponents), finished in seventh place in the PCC, and outscored opponents by a total of 171 to 58.

Following the season, Warner left Stanford to become the head coach at Temple.

== Schedule ==
| Date | Opponent | Site | Result | Attendance | Source |
|---|---|---|---|---|---|
| September 17 | Olympic Club* | Stanford Stadium; Stanford, CA | W 6–0 | 7,000 | |
| September 24 | at San Francisco* | Kezar Stadium; San Francisco, CA | W 20–7 | | |
| October 1 | at Oregon State | Multnomah Stadium; Portland, OR | W 27–0 | 15,000 | |
| October 8 | Santa Clara* | Stanford Stadium; Stanford, CA | W 14–0 | 30,000 | |
| October 15 | West Coast Army* | Stanford Stadium; Stanford, CA | W 26–0 | | |
| October 27 | USC | Stanford Stadium; Stanford, CA (rivalry) | L 0–13 | 60,000 | |
| October 29 | at UCLA | Los Angeles Memorial Coliseum; Los Angeles, CA | L 6–13 | 45,000 | |
| November 5 | Washington | Stanford Stadium; Stanford, CA | L 13–18 | 20,000 | |
| November 12 | Cal Aggies* | Stanford Stadium; Stanford, CA | W 59–0 | 5,000 | |
| November 19 | at California | Memorial Stadium; Berkeley, CA (Big Game) | T 0–0 | 80,000 | |
| November 26 | at Pittsburgh* | Pitt Stadium; Pittsburgh, PA | L 0–7 | 35,000 | |
*Non-conference game

== Game summaries ==
=== California ===
The 1932 Big Game is the only game in the series to have ended in a scoreless tie.
