= 1932 Washington Huskies football team =

American college football season

1932 Washington Huskies football
- Conference: Pacific Coast Conference
- Record: 6–2–2 (3–2–2 PCC)
- Head coach: Jimmy Phelan (3rd season)
- Captain: Bill O'Brien
- Home stadium: University of Washington Stadium

1932 Pacific Coast Conference football standings
	Conf.					Overall
Team	W		L		T	W		L		T
No. 2 USC $	6	–	0	–	0	10	–	0	–	0
Washington State	5	–	1	–	1	7	–	1	–	1
UCLA	4	–	2	–	0	6	–	4	–	0
Washington	3	–	2	–	2	6	–	2	–	2
Oregon	2	–	2	–	1	6	–	3	–	1
California	2	–	2	–	1	7	–	3	–	2
Stanford	1	–	3	–	1	6	–	4	–	1
Oregon State	1	–	4	–	0	4	–	6	–	0
Idaho	1	–	4	–	0	3	–	5	–	0
Montana	0	–	5	–	0	2	–	7	–	0
$ – Conference champion; Rankings from Dickinson System

The 1932 Washington Huskies football team was an American football team that represented the University of Washington during the 1932 college football season. In its third season under head coach Jimmy Phelan, the team compiled a 6–2–2 record, finished in fourth place in the Pacific Coast Conference, and outscored all opponents by a combined total of 193 to 56. Bill O'Brien was the team captain.

== Schedule ==
Date	Opponent	Site	Result	Attendance	Source
September 24	Gonzaga*	University of Washington Stadium; Seattle, WA	W 19–7	11,555	
October 1	Montana	University of Washington Stadium; Seattle, WA	W 26–13	8,882	
October 8	vs. Oregon	Multnomah Stadium; Portland, OR (rivalry)	T 0–0	32,000	
October 22	California	University of Washington Stadium; Seattle, WA	L 6–7	19,173	
October 29	Whitman*	University of Washington Stadium; Seattle, WA	W 33–7	5,000	
November 5	at Stanford	Stanford Stadium; Stanford, CA	W 18–13	20,000	
November 12	Washington State	University of Washington Stadium; Seattle, WA (rivalry)	T 0–0	20,000	
November 24	USC	University of Washington Stadium; Seattle, WA	L 6–9	30,000	
December 3	at UCLA	Los Angeles Memorial Coliseum; Los Angeles, CA	W 19–0	25,000	
December 10	West Seattle Athletic Club*	University of Washington Stadium; Seattle, WA	W 66–0	7,000	
*Non-conference game
