= John Rhodes (coach) =

American football and baseball player and track athlete (1903–1951)

Biographical details
- Born: February 6, 1903; Nebraska, U.S.
- Died: May 24, 1951 (aged 48); Spalding, Nebraska, U.S.

Playing career

Football
- 1923–1925: Nebraska

Baseball
- 1924–1925: Nebraska
- Position: Halfback (football)

Coaching career (HC unless noted)

Football
- 1926–1927: Nebraska (freshmen)
- 1928: Nebraska (backs)
- 1929: Nebraska (freshmen)
- 1930–1932: Wyoming
- 1938: Blair HS (NE)
- 1939: St. Louis Gunners
- 1941–1942: Blair HS (NE)

Baseball
- 1929–1930: Nebraska

Administrative career (AD unless noted)
- 1930–1933: Wyoming

Head coaching record
- Overall: 10–15–2 (college football); 21–12–1 (college baseball)

Accomplishments and honors

Awards
- Football; First-team All-MVC (1925)

John Rupert "Choppy" Rhodes (February 6, 1903 – May 24, 1951) was an American football and baseball player, track athlete, coach of football and baseball, and college athletics administrator. He served as the head football coach at the University of Wyoming from 1930 to 1932, compiling a record of 10–15–2. He was also Wyoming's athletic director at the time. Rhodes played football and baseball and ran track at the University of Nebraska–Lincoln. He was the head baseball coach at his alma mater, Nebraska, from 1929 to 1930, tallying a mark of 21–12–1.

Rhodes was a native of Ansley, Nebraska. He coached high school football at the Blair High School in Blair, Nebraska in 1938, 1941, and 1942. Rhodes died of a heart ailment on May 24, 1951, at his home in Spalding, Nebraska.

== Head coaching record ==
=== College football ===
Year	Team	Overall	Conference	Standing	Bowl/playoffs
Wyoming Cowboys (Rocky Mountain Conference) (1930–1932)
1930	Wyoming	2–5–1	1–5–1	11th	
1931	Wyoming	6–4	3–2	T–4th	
1932	Wyoming	2–6–1	1–4–1	9th	
Wyoming:		10–15–2	5–11–2		
Total:		10–15–2			
