= 1932 Wyoming Cowboys football team =

American college football season

1932 Wyoming Cowboys football
- Conference: Rocky Mountain Conference
- Record: 2–6–1 (1–4–1 RMC)
- Head coach: John Rhodes (3rd season)
- Captain: None
- Home stadium: Corbett Field

1932 Rocky Mountain Conference football standings
	Conf.					Overall
Team	W		L		T	W		L		T
Utah $	6	–	0	–	0	6	–	1	–	1
BYU	5	–	1	–	0	8	–	1	–	0
Colorado College	5	–	2	–	0	5	–	2	–	0
Denver	4	–	1	–	1	4	–	3	–	1
Colorado Agricultural	4	–	3	–	1	4	–	3	–	1
Colorado Teachers	2	–	2	–	1	4	–	2	–	1
Utah State	3	–	3	–	0	4	–	4	–	0
Colorado	2	–	4	–	0	2	–	4	–	0
Wyoming	1	–	4	–	1	2	–	6	–	1
Colorado Mines	1	–	5	–	0	1	–	7	–	0
Montana State	0	–	3	–	0	3	–	3	–	1
Western State (CO)	0	–	5	–	0	1	–	5	–	0
$ – Conference champion

The 1932 Wyoming Cowboys football team was an American football team that represented the University of Wyoming as a member of the Rocky Mountain Conference (RMC) during the 1932 college football season. In their third and final season under head coach John Rhodes, the Cowboys compiled a 2–6–1 record (1–4–1 against RMC opponents), finished ninth in the conference, and were outscored by a total of 137 to 53.

== Schedule ==
Date	Opponent	Site	Result	Attendance	Source
October 1	Chadron State*	Corbett Field; Laramie, WY	W 28–6		
October 7	at Saint Louis*	Walsh Stadium; St. Louis, MO	L 6–20	8,000	
October 15	Montana State	Corbett Field; Laramie, WY	W 13–7		
October 22	at Colorado College	Washburn Field; Colorado Springs, CO	L 6–15	2,500	
October 29	BYU	Corbett Field; Laramie, WY	L 0–25		
November 5	at Denver	Denver University Stadium; Denver, CO	L 0–7		
November 11	Colorado Teachers	Corbett Field; Laramie, WY	T 0–0	2,000	
November 18	at Creighton*	Creighton Stadium; Omaha, NE	L 0–34		
November 24	at Colorado Agricultural	Colorado Field; Fort Collins, CO	L 0–23		
*Non-conference game
