= 1932 Fresno State Bulldogs football team =

American college football season

1932 Fresno State Bulldogs football
- Conference: Far Western Conference
- Record: 3–5–2 (0–3–1 FWC)
- Head coach: Stanley Borleske (4th season)
- Home stadium: Fresno State College Stadium

1932 Far Western Conference football standings
	Conf.					Overall
Team	W		L		T	W		L		T
San Jose State +	3	–	0	–	2	7	–	0	–	2
Nevada +	2	–	0	–	1	3	–	3	–	2
Chico State	2	–	1	–	0	3	–	5	–	0
Pacific (CA)	2	–	2	–	0	4	–	4	–	0
Cal Aggies	1	–	4	–	0	1	–	8	–	1
Fresno State	0	–	3	–	1	3	–	5	–	2
+ – Conference co-champions

The 1932 Fresno State Bulldogs football team represented Fresno State Normal School during the 1932 college football season.

Fresno State competed in the Far Western Conference (FWC). (Note: The Northern California Athletic Conference (NCAC) was known as the Far Western Conference (FWC) from its founding in 1925 to 1982.) The 1932 team was led by fourth-year head coach Stanley Borleske and played home games at Fresno State College Stadium (Note: Ratcliffe Stadium was known as Fresno State College Stadium from 1926 to 1940.) on the campus of Fresno City College in Fresno, California. They finished the season with a record of three wins, five losses and two ties (3–5–2, 0–3–1 FWC). The Bulldogs were outscored by their opponents 56–91 for the season, and were shut out in six of their ten games.

== Schedule ==
Date	Opponent	Site	Result	Attendance	Source
September 24	San Diego Marines*	Fresno State College Stadium; Fresno, CA	W 12–0	4,500	
October 1	West Coast Army*	Fresno State College Stadium; Fresno, CA	L 6–7		
October 8	Cal Aggies	Fresno State College Stadium; Fresno, CA	L 0–3		
October 15	San Francisco State*	Fresno State College Stadium; Fresno, CA	W 32–13	3,500	
October 21	at San Jose State	Spartan Field; San Jose, CA (rivalry)	T 0–0		
October 29	at Pacific (CA)	Baxter Stadium; Stockton, CA	L 0–35		
November 5	at Arizona State–Flagstaff*	Skidmore Field; Flagstaff, AZ	T 0–0	\	
November 11	at Washburn*	Moore Bowl; Topeka, KS	L 0–26	3,500	
November 18	La Verne*	Fresno State College Stadium; Fresno, CA	W 6–0		
November 24	Nevada	Fresno State College Stadium; Fresno, CA	L 0–7		
*Non-conference game
