= Ogden Stadium =

Stadium in the U.S. state of Utah

- Interactive map of Ogden Stadium
- Location: 668 17th Street; Ogden, Utah, U.S.
- Coordinates: 41°14′14″N 111°57′43″W
- Capacity: 20,000
- Surface: Dirt

Construction
- Groundbreaking: June 9, 1930
- Opened: August 15, 1930

Website
- ogdencity.com/Facilities/Facility/Details/Ogden-Pioneer-Stadium-35

Ogden Stadium, also known as Ogden Pioneer Stadium, is a multi-purpose stadium located within Lorin Farr Park (Note: Pool scenes in the 1993 sports film The Sandlot were filmed at the Lorin Farr Community Pool near the stadium.) in Ogden, Utah. The stadium seats around 20,000, but is not currently used for any of the four "major" United States sports.

== History ==
Citizens of Ogden, including representatives of the American Legion and Elks organizations, formed a committee in April 1928 to coordinate construction of a stadium. In February 1929, cost was estimated at $65,000. The following month, the City of Ogden agreed to support the effort, along with Weber Junior College and local school boards. The stadium was initially scheduled to open in the fall of 1929, with a college football game between the BYU Cougars and the Agricultural College of Utah (now the Utah State Aggies). In August, $75,000 was raised via bond sales, with the first game moved back, expected to feature Weber Junior College and the McKinley School of Honolulu in late October. In mid-October, during the Wall Street crash of 1929, the city effectively took over the stadium effort by creating a stadium board and agreeing to finance construction.

Construction of the stadium began on June 9, 1930, was completed during the summer of 1930, and the stadium was first used on August 15, for a fireworks show and big bands to celebrate the start of an athletics meet sponsored by the Union Pacific Railroad. Lighting was in place weeks later, as the Utah State University freshman squad defeated Weber Junior College in a night game on October 10.

The stadium hosted various college football contests, including games with the Idaho State Bengals, Nevada Wolf Pack, and Utah Utes. It was also used as a boxing venue, featuring champions such as Max Baer, Ezzard Charles, Gene Fullmer, and Joey Maxim.

== Current usage ==
The stadium also plays host to the Ogden Pioneer Days Rodeo, which is held every year during the week of Utah's Pioneer Day.
