= 1932 Cal Aggies football team =

American college football season

1932 Cal Aggies football
- Conference: Far Western Conference
- Record: 1–8–1 (1–4 FWC)
- Head coach: Crip Toomey (5th season)
- Captain: Russ Sweet
- Home stadium: A Street field

1932 Far Western Conference football standings
	Conf.					Overall
Team	W		L		T	W		L		T
San Jose State +	3	–	0	–	2	7	–	0	–	2
Nevada +	2	–	0	–	1	3	–	3	–	2
Chico State	2	–	1	–	0	3	–	5	–	0
Pacific (CA)	2	–	2	–	0	4	–	4	–	0
Cal Aggies	1	–	4	–	0	1	–	8	–	1
Fresno State	0	–	3	–	1	3	–	5	–	2
+ – Conference co-champions

The 1932 Cal Aggies football team represented the Northern Branch of the College of Agriculture—now known as the University of California, Davis—as a member of the Far Western Conference (FWC) during the 1932 college football season. Led by fifth-year head coach Crip Toomey, the Aggies compiled an overall record of 1–8–1 with a mark of 1–1–4 in conference play, placing fifth in the FWC. The team was outscored by its opponents 211 to 42 for the season. The Cal Aggies played home games at A Street field on campus in Davis, California.

== Schedule ==
Date	Opponent	Site	Result	Attendance	Source
September 17	at California*	California Memorial Stadium; Berkeley, CA	L 6–20	20,000	
September 23	at UCLA*	Los Angeles Memorial Coliseum; Los Angeles, CA	L 0–26	5,000	
October 1	at Southern Oregon Normal*	Walter E. Phillips Field?; Ashland, OR	T 12–12		
October 8	at Fresno State	Fresno State College Stadium; Fresno, CA	W 3–0		
October 14	Pacific (CA)	A Street field; Davis, CA	L 0–30		
October 22	at Nevada	Mackay Stadium (Note: This stadium is the predecessor to the current Mackay Stadium, which was opened for the 1966 season.); Reno, NV	L 0–16	4,000	
October 29	at Sacramento*	Sacramento, CA	L 8–13		
November 5	at Chico State	Chico High School Stadium; Chico, CA	L 6–16		
November 12	at Stanford*	Stanford Stadium; Stanford, CA	L 0–59	5,000	
November 19	at San Jose State	Spartan Field; San Jose, CA	L 7–19		
*Non-conference game
