= 1932 Santa Clara Broncos football team =

American college football season

1932 Santa Clara Broncos football
- Conference: Independent
- Record: 6–3
- Head coach: Clipper Smith (4th season)
- Home stadium: Kezar Stadium

1932 Western college football independents records
	Conf.			Overall
Team	W	L	T	W		L		T
Columbia (OR)		–		6	–	0	–	1
Saint Mary's		–		6	–	2	–	1
Santa Clara		–		6	–	3	–	0
Gonzaga		–		5	–	3	–	0
Hawaii		–		2	–	1	–	1
Cal Poly		–		4	–	4	–	0
Loyola (CA)		–		4	–	4	–	0
San Francisco		–		2	–	6	–	0
Humboldt State		–		1	–	4	–	0
San Francisco State		–		1	–	7	–	0

The 1932 Santa Clara Broncos football team was an American football team that represented Santa Clara University as an independent during the 1932 college football season. In their fourth season under head coach Clipper Smith, the Broncos compiled a 6–3 record and outscored opponents by a total of 121 to 41.

== Schedule ==
Date	Opponent	Site	Result	Attendance	Source
September 24	at California	California Memorial Stadium; Berkeley, CA	W 12–0	50,000	
October 1	at Oregon	Hayward Field; Eugene, OR	L 0–7		
October 8	at Stanford	Stanford Stadium; Stanford, CA	L 0–14	30,000	
October 16	at San Diego Marines	San Diego, CA	W 32–0		
October 30	at Saint Mary's	Kezar Stadium; San Francisco, CA	L 13–14	60,000	
November 5	Pacific (CA)	Kezar Stadium; San Francisco, CA	W 27–0	5,000	
November 13	at San Francisco	Kezar Stadium; San Francisco, CA	W 7–0		
November 20	at Olympic Club	Kezar Stadium; San Francisco, CA	W 12–0		
November 26	at Loyola (CA)	Wrigley Field; Los Angeles, CA	W 18–6	10,000	
