= 1932 Saint Mary's Gaels football team =

American college football season

1932 Saint Mary's Gaels football
- Conference: Independent
- Record: 6–2–1
- Head coach: Slip Madigan (12th season)
- Home stadium: Kezar Stadium

1932 Western college football independents records
	Conf.			Overall
Team	W	L	T	W		L		T
Columbia (OR)		–		6	–	0	–	1
Saint Mary's		–		6	–	2	–	1
Santa Clara		–		6	–	3	–	0
Gonzaga		–		5	–	3	–	0
Hawaii		–		2	–	1	–	1
Cal Poly		–		4	–	4	–	0
Loyola (CA)		–		4	–	4	–	0
San Francisco		–		2	–	6	–	0
Humboldt State		–		1	–	4	–	0
San Francisco State		–		1	–	7	–	0

The 1932 Saint Mary's Gaels football team was an American football team that represented Saint Mary's College of California during the 1932 college football season. In their 12th season under head coach Slip Madigan, the Gaels compiled a 6–2–1 record and outscored all opponents by a combined total of 118 to 59. The Gaels' victories included a 14–7 besting of UCLA and a 7–0 victory over Oregon. The lone setbacks were a 12-12 tie with California and losses to Fordham (0–14) and Alabama (0–6).

Fullback Angelo Brovelli was selected by the Associated Press as a first-team player on the 1932 All-Pacific Coast football team. Guard Steponovitch received first-team honors from the United Press.

== Schedule ==
Date	Opponent	Site	Result	Attendance	Source
September 24	at West Coast Army	Kezar Stadium; San Francisco, CA	W 20–0	20,000	
October 1	Nevada	Kezar Stadium; San Francisco, CA	W 35–0	< 5,000	
October 8	at California	California Memorial Stadium; Berkeley, CA	T 12–12	55,000	
October 16	San Francisco	Kezar Stadium; San Francisco, CA	W 16–7	25,000	
October 30	Santa Clara	Kezar Stadium; San Francisco, CA	W 14–13	60,000	
November 5	at Fordham	Polo Grounds; New York, NY	L 0–14	40,000	
November 11	at UCLA	Los Angeles Memorial Coliseum; Los Angeles, CA	W 14–7	70,000	
November 24	Oregon	Kezar Stadium; San Francisco, CA (Governors' Trophy Game)	W 7–0		
December 3	Alabama	Kezar Stadium; San Francisco, CA	L 0–6	20,000	
