= 1932 San Francisco Dons football team =

American college football season

1932 San Francisco Dons football
- Conference: Independent
- Record: 2–6
- Head coach: Spud Lewis (1st season)
- Home stadium: Kezar Stadium

1932 Western college football independents records
	Conf.			Overall
Team	W	L	T	W		L		T
Columbia (OR)		–		6	–	0	–	1
Saint Mary's		–		6	–	2	–	1
Santa Clara		–		6	–	3	–	0
Gonzaga		–		5	–	3	–	0
Hawaii		–		2	–	1	–	1
Cal Poly		–		4	–	4	–	0
Loyola (CA)		–		4	–	4	–	0
San Francisco		–		2	–	6	–	0
Humboldt State		–		1	–	4	–	0
San Francisco State		–		1	–	7	–	0

The 1932 San Francisco Dons football team was an American football team that represented the University of San Francisco as an independent during the 1932 college football season. In their first season under head coach Spud Lewis, the Dons compiled a 2–6 record and were outscored by a combined total of 90 to 77.

Spud Lewis was hired as the team's head football coach in January 1932. He had been a star football player at Stanford and had most recently served as an assistant coach under Dick Hanley at Northwestern. Lewis replaced Jimmy Needles, who coached the football team from 1924 to 1931.

== Schedule ==
Date	Opponent	Site	Result	Attendance	Source
September 24	Stanford	Kezar Stadium; San Francisco, CA	L 7–20		
October 2	West Coast Navy	Kezar Stadium; San Francisco, CA	L 14–21		
October 9	West Coast Army	Kezar Stadium; San Francisco, CA	L 7–13		
October 16	Saint Mary's	Kezar Stadium; San Francisco, CA	L 7–16	25,000	
October 23	Olympic Club	Kezar Stadium; San Francisco, CA	W 16–0		
October 30	at Loyola (CA)	Wrigley Field; Los Angeles, CA	W 26–7	15,000	
November 6	Gonzaga	Kezar Stadium; San Francisco, CA	L 0–6	15,000	
November 13	Santa Clara	Kezar Stadium; San Francisco, CA	L 0–7		
