= 1932 Santa Barbara State Roadrunners football team =

American college football season

1932 Santa Barbara State Roadrunners football
- Conference: Southern California Intercollegiate Athletic Conference
- Record: 1–6 (1–6 SCIAC)
- Head coach: Harold Davis (5th season)
- Home stadium: Peabody Stadium

1932 Southern California Conference football standings
	Conf.					Overall
Team	W		L		T	W		L		T
Whittier $	5	–	1	–	0	10	–	1	–	0
Redlands	5	–	2	–	0	7	–	2	–	0
La Verne	5	–	2	–	0	6	–	2	–	0
Occidental	4	–	2	–	1	4	–	4	–	1
Pomona	2	–	4	–	0	2	–	4	–	0
San Diego State	2	–	4	–	1	3	–	5	–	1
Caltech	2	–	5	–	0	2	–	7	–	0
Santa Barbara State	1	–	6	–	0	1	–	6	–	0
$ – Conference champion

The 1932 Santa Barbara State Roadrunners football team represented Santa Barbara State (Note: University of California, Santa Barbara was known as Santa Barbara State College from 1921 to 1943.) during the 1932 college football season.

Santa Barbara State competed in the Southern California Intercollegiate Athletic Conference (SCIAC). The Roadrunners were led by fifth-year head coach Harold Davis and played home games at Peabody Stadium in Santa Barbara, California. They finished the season with a record of one win and six losses (1–6, 1–6 SCIAC). Overall, the team was outscored by its opponents 12–151 for the season. The Roadrunners were shutout five times, and failed to score more than a touchdown in all seven games.

== Schedule ==
Date	Opponent	Site	Result
September 23	at San Diego State	Balboa Stadium; San Diego, CA	W 6–2
October 8	Pomona	Peabody Stadium; Santa Barbara, CA	L 0–13
October 15	at Redlands	Redlands Stadium (Note: This stadium is the predecessor to the current Ted Runner Stadium on the University of Redlands campus, which was opened for the 1968 season); Redlands, CA	L 0–33
October 28	Caltech	Peabody Stadium; Santa Barbara, CA	L 0–3
November 4	at Occidental	D.W. Patterson Field; Los Angeles, CA	L 0–20
November 19	at Whittier	Hadley Field; Whittier, CA	L 6–46
November 24	at La Verne	La Verne, CA	L 0–34
