= 1932 Loyola Lions football team =

American college football season

1932 Loyola Lions football
- Conference: Independent
- Record: 4–4
- Head coach: Tom Lieb (3rd season)
- Home stadium: Wrigley Field

1932 Western college football independents records
	Conf.			Overall
Team	W	L	T	W		L		T
Columbia (OR)		–		6	–	0	–	1
Saint Mary's		–		6	–	2	–	1
Santa Clara		–		6	–	3	–	0
Gonzaga		–		5	–	3	–	0
Hawaii		–		2	–	1	–	1
Cal Poly		–		4	–	4	–	0
Loyola (CA)		–		4	–	4	–	0
San Francisco		–		2	–	6	–	0
Humboldt State		–		1	–	4	–	0
San Francisco State		–		1	–	7	–	0

The 1932 Loyola Lions football team was an American football team that represented Loyola University of Los Angeles (now known as Loyola Marymount University) as an independent during the 1932 college football season. In their third season under head coach Tom Lieb, the Lions compiled a 4–4 record.

== Schedule ==
Date	Opponent	Site	Result	Attendance	Source
September 24	Caltech	Wrigley Field; Los Angeles, CA	W 31–0		
October 1	at Arizona	Arizona Stadium; Tucson, AZ	W 33–6		
October 9	at San Diego Marines	San Diego, CA	W 6–0		
October 15	at USC	Los Angeles Memorial Coliseum; Los Angeles, CA	L 0–6	50,000	
October 30	San Francisco	Wrigley Field; Los Angeles, CA	L 7–26	15,000	
November 4	New Mexico	Wrigley Field; Los Angeles, CA	W 52–0		
November 11	at Whittier	Hadley Field; Whittier, CA	L 0–15	6,000	
November 26	Santa Clara	Wrigley Field; Los Angeles, CA	L 6–18	10,000	
