= 1932 San Francisco State Golden Gaters football team =

American college football season

1932 San Francisco State Golden Gaters football
- Conference: Independent
- Record: 1–7
- Head coach: Dave Cox (2nd season)
- Home stadium: Ewing Field

1932 Western college football independents records
	Conf.			Overall
Team	W	L	T	W		L		T
Columbia (OR)		–		6	–	0	–	1
Saint Mary's		–		6	–	2	–	1
Santa Clara		–		6	–	3	–	0
Gonzaga		–		5	–	3	–	0
Hawaii		–		2	–	1	–	1
Cal Poly		–		4	–	4	–	0
Loyola (CA)		–		4	–	4	–	0
San Francisco		–		2	–	6	–	0
Humboldt State		–		1	–	4	–	0
San Francisco State		–		1	–	7	–	0

The 1932 San Francisco State Golden Gaters football team represented San Francisco State Teachers College—now known as San Francisco State University—as an independent during the 1932 college football season. Led by second-year head coach Dave Cox, San Francisco State compiled a record of 1–7 and was outscored by its opponents 149 to 157. The team played home games at Ewing Field in San Francisco. Although the "Gator" was voted to be the mascot for the team in 1931, local newspaper articles called the team the "Golden Gaters".

== Schedule ==
Date	Opponent	Site	Result	Source
September 3	Marin	Ewing Field; San Francisco, CA	L 0–7	
September 10	at San Mateo	Burlingame High School; Burlingame, CA	L 6–27	
September 24	at Chico State	College Field; Chico, CA	L 0–26	
October 1	San Jose State	Ewing Field; San Francisco, CA	L 0–19	
October 8	Humboldt State	Ewing Field; San Francisco, CA	W 32–6	
October 15	at Fresno State	Fresno State College Stadium; Fresno, CA	L 13–32	
October 22	at Santa Rosa	Bailey Field; Santa Rosa, CA	L 6–13	
October 29	Modesto	Ewing Field; San Francisco, CA	L 0–19	
