= 1932 Gonzaga Bulldogs football team =

American college football season

1932 Gonzaga Bulldogs football
- Conference: Independent
- Record: 5–3
- Head coach: Mike Pecarovich (2nd season)
- Home stadium: Gonzaga Stadium

1932 Western college football independents records
	Conf.			Overall
Team	W	L	T	W		L		T
Columbia (OR)		–		6	–	0	–	1
Saint Mary's		–		6	–	2	–	1
Santa Clara		–		6	–	3	–	0
Gonzaga		–		5	–	3	–	0
Hawaii		–		2	–	1	–	1
Cal Poly		–		4	–	4	–	0
Loyola (CA)		–		4	–	4	–	0
San Francisco		–		2	–	6	–	0
Humboldt State		–		1	–	4	–	0
San Francisco State		–		1	–	7	–	0

The 1932 Gonzaga Bulldogs football team was an American football team that represented Gonzaga University during the 1932 college football season. In their second year under head coach Mike Pecarovich, the Bulldogs compiled a 5–3 record and outscored their opponents by a total of 178 to 77.

The team was led by fullback Max Krause who was selected by the United Press as the first-team fullback on the 1932 All-Pacific Coast football team. Krause scored 25 points in the final game of the season, bringing his season total to 86 points. Krause later played eight years in the National Football League for the New York Giants and Washington Redskins.

== Schedule ==
Date	Opponent	Site	Result	Attendance	Source
September 17	Oregon State	Gonzaga Stadium; Spokane, WA	L 16–19		
September 24	at Washington	Husky Stadium; Seattle	L 7–19	11,555	
October 8	at Idaho	Gonzaga Stadium; Spokane, WA (rivalry)	W 20–7		
October 15	at Dakota Wesleyan	Gonzaga Stadium; Spokane, WA	W 61–6		
October 29	at Oregon	Hayward Field; Eugene, OR	L 0–13		
November 6	San Francisco	Kezar Stadium; San Francisco	W 6–0	15,000	
November 19	South Dakota	Gonzaga Stadium; Spokane, WA	W 12–0		
November 26	Montana^{†}	Gonzaga Stadium; Spokane, WA	W 56–13	4,000	
^{†}Homecoming
