= 1932 Humboldt State Lumberjacks football team =

American college football season

1932 Humboldt State Lumberjacks football
- Conference: Independent
- Record: 1–4
- Head coach: Fred Telonicher (6th season)
- Home stadium: Albee Stadium

1932 Western college football independents records
	Conf.			Overall
Team	W	L	T	W		L		T
Columbia (OR)		–		6	–	0	–	1
Saint Mary's		–		6	–	2	–	1
Santa Clara		–		6	–	3	–	0
Gonzaga		–		5	–	3	–	0
Hawaii		–		2	–	1	–	1
Cal Poly		–		4	–	4	–	0
Loyola (CA)		–		4	–	4	–	0
San Francisco		–		2	–	6	–	0
Humboldt State		–		1	–	4	–	0
San Francisco State		–		1	–	7	–	0

The 1932 Humboldt State Lumberjacks football team represented Humboldt State Normal College—now known as California State Polytechnic University, Humboldt—as an independent during the 1932 college football season. Led by sixth-year head coach Fred Telonicher, the Lumberjacks compiled a record of 1–4 and were outscored by their opponents 96 to 32 for the season. The team played home games at Albee Stadium in Eureka, California.

== Schedule ==
Date	Opponent	Site	Result	Source
	Ferndale High School		L 7–13	
October 8	at San Francisco State	Ewing Field; San Francisco, CA	L 6–32	
October 21	Southern Oregon Normal	Albee Stadium; Eureka, CA	L 0–25	
	Eureka High School	Albee Stadium; Eureka, CA	W 7–0	
November 12	at Santa Rosa	Nevers Field; Santa Rosa, CA	L 12–26	
