= 1932 Hawaii Rainbows football team =

American college football season

1932 Hawaii Rainbows football
- Conference: Independent
- Record: 2–1–1
- Head coach: Otto Klum (12th season)
- Home stadium: Honolulu Stadium

1932 Western college football independents records
	Conf.			Overall
Team	W	L	T	W		L		T
Columbia (OR)		–		6	–	0	–	1
Saint Mary's		–		6	–	2	–	1
Santa Clara		–		6	–	3	–	0
Gonzaga		–		5	–	3	–	0
Hawaii		–		2	–	1	–	1
Cal Poly		–		4	–	4	–	0
Loyola (CA)		–		4	–	4	–	0
San Francisco		–		2	–	6	–	0
Humboldt State		–		1	–	4	–	0
San Francisco State		–		1	–	7	–	0

The 1932 Hawaii Rainbows football team represented the University of Hawaiʻi (now known as the University of Hawaiʻi at Mānoa) as an independent during the 1932 college football season. Led by 12th-year head coach Otto Klum, the Rainbows compiled an overall record of 2–1–1.

== Schedule ==
Date	Opponent	Site	Result	Attendance	Source
October 1	McKinley High School alumni	Honolulu Stadium; Honolulu, Territory of Hawaii	L 0–13	3,000	
October 19	Kamehameha alumni	Honolulu Stadium; Honolulu, Territory of Hawaii	T 0–0	2,000	
November 2	Saint Louis School alumni	Honolulu Stadium; Honolulu, Territory of Hawaii	W 12–2		
November 19	Honolulu Town Team	Honolulu Stadium; Honolulu, Territory of Hawaii	W 20–13		
