= 1932 Columbia Irish football team =

American college football season

1932 Columbia Irish football
- Conference: Independent
- Record: 6–0–1
- Head coach: Gene Murphy (6th season)
- Home stadium: Multnomah Stadium

1932 Western college football independents records
	Conf.			Overall
Team	W	L	T	W		L		T
Columbia (OR)		–		6	–	0	–	1
Saint Mary's		–		6	–	2	–	1
Santa Clara		–		6	–	3	–	0
Gonzaga		–		5	–	3	–	0
Hawaii		–		2	–	1	–	1
Cal Poly		–		4	–	4	–	0
Loyola (CA)		–		4	–	4	–	0
San Francisco		–		2	–	6	–	0
Humboldt State		–		1	–	4	–	0
San Francisco State		–		1	–	7	–	0

The 1932 Columbia Irish football team was an American football team that represented Columbia University (later renamed the University of Portland) as an independent during the 1932 college football season. In its sixth year under head coach Gene Murphy, the team compiled a 6–0–1 record. The team played its home games at Multnomah Stadium in Portland, Oregon.

== Schedule ==
Date	Opponent	Site	Result	Attendance	Source
September 29	Pacific (OR)	Portland, OR	T 12–12		
October 13	Eastern Oregon	Multnomah Stadium; Portland, OR	W 19–0		
October 22	at Linfield	McMinnville, OR	W 19–7		
October 29	College of Idaho	Portland, OR	W 26–0		
November 5	at Whitman	Walla Walla, WA	W 20–6		
November 12	at Pacific Lutheran	Tacoma, WA	W 7–0		
November 26	Puget Sound	Portland, OR	W 6–0		
