= USA Today / CNN Top 25 =

The USA Today / CNN Top 25 football poll was a weekly ranking of the top 25 NCAA Division I Football Bowl Subdivision college football teams. The poll was published in the nascent national newspaper USA Today, which first launched in 1982, and was distributed on parent company Gannett's newswire. Starting in 1983 the poll took on CNN as a voting and broadcast partner.

The Top 25 poll was an alternative and competitor to the established major wire service polls: the Associated Press media poll and the United Press International poll of coaches.

At the end of each season the poll's No. 1 team was awarded the Top 25 trophy, emblematic of the poll's college football national championship. The NCAA recognizes the USA Today and USA Today / CNN polls as "major selectors" of national championships for the years 1982 and 1983–1990, and additionally denotes that the Top 25 poll's selection constitutes a "consensus national champion".

The original Top 25 poll ended prior to the 1991 season when USA Today / CNN instead took over distribution of the more distinguished AFCA Coaches Poll from UPI.

== National champions ==
The USA Today / CNN Top 25 poll selected the following college football national champions during the poll's 9 years:

Season	Champion	Record
1982	Penn State	11–1
1983	Miami	11–1
1984	BYU	13–0
1985	Oklahoma	11–1
1986	Penn State	12–0
1987	Miami	12–0
1988	Notre Dame	12–0
1989	Miami	11–1
1990	Colorado	11–1–1

Starting in 1991, USA Today / CNN took over operation of the Coaches Poll from UPI and awarded the Coaches' Trophy.

=== Top 25 trophy ===
The No. 1 team on the final Top 25 poll was awarded the USA Today / CNN Top 25 National College Football Champion trophy.
