= College football national championships in NCAA Division I FBS =

Annual selection of best U.S. team

National championships NCAA Division I FBS
- Current season, competition or edition: 2026 NCAA Division I FBS football season
- Sport: American football
- Founded: 1869; 157 years ago
- First season: 1869
- Organizing body: CFP Administration, LLC
- Country: United States
- Most recent champion: Indiana Hoosiers (2025)
- Most titles: Princeton (28 titles)
- Level on pyramid: 1
- Related competitions: Division I (FCS)
- Website: ncaa.com/football/fbs

A national championship in the highest level of college football in the United States, currently the NCAA Division I Football Bowl Subdivision (FBS), is a designation awarded annually by various organizations to their selection of the best college football team. Division I FBS football is the only National Collegiate Athletic Association (NCAA) sport for which the NCAA does not host a yearly championship event. As such, it is sometimes referred to as a "mythical national championship".

Due to the lack of an official NCAA title, determining the nation's top college football team has often engendered controversy. A championship team is independently declared by multiple individuals and organizations, often referred to as "selectors". These choices are not always unanimous. In 1969 even the president of the United States, Richard Nixon, made a selection by announcing, ahead of the season-ending "game of the century" between No. 1 Texas and No. 2 (AP) Arkansas, that the winner would receive a presidential plaque commemorating them as national champions despite the fact that Texas and Arkansas still had to play in a bowl game afterward. Texas went on to win, 15–14.

While the NCAA has never officially endorsed a championship team, it has documented the choices of some selectors in its official NCAA Football Bowl Subdivision Records publication. In addition, various analysts have independently published their own choices for each season. These opinions can often diverge with others as well as individual schools' claims to national titles, which may or may not correlate to the selections published elsewhere. Historically, the two most widely recognized national championship selectors are the Associated Press (AP), which conducts a poll of sportswriters, and the Coaches Poll, a survey of active members of the American Football Coaches Association (AFCA).

Since 1992, various consortia of major bowl games have aimed to invite the top two teams at the end of the regular season (as determined by internal rankings, or aggregates of the major polls and other statistics) to compete in what is intended to be the de facto national championship game. The current iteration of this practice, the College Football Playoff, selects twelve teams to participate in a national first round or quarterfinals, with the final four teams advancing to the semifinals. The games of the quarterfinals and semifinals are hosted by all of the six partner bowl games, with the final two remaining teams advancing to the College Football Playoff National Championship.

== History ==
The Sun was among the first to publish year-end college football rankings.

The concept of a national championship in college football dates to the early years of the sport in the late 19th century. Some of the earliest contemporaneous rankings can be traced to Caspar Whitney in Harper's Weekly, J. Parmly Paret in Outing, Charles Patterson, and New York newspaper The Sun.

Football, however, is not a game where a great national championship is possible or desirable. The very nature of the sport would forbid anything like such a series of contests as are played in baseball.

— Walter Camp, 1919

Claimed intercollegiate championships were limited to various selections and rankings, as the nature of the developing and increasingly violent full-contact sport made it impossible to schedule a post-season tournament to determine an "official" or undisputed champion. National championships in this era were well understood to be "mythical".

Beyond rankings in newspaper columns, awards and trophies began to be presented to teams. In 1917 members of the 9–0 Georgia Tech squad were given gold footballs with the inscription "National Champions" by alumni at their post-season banquet. The Veteran Athletes of Philadelphia put up the Bonniwell Trophy for the national championship in 1919 under the stipulation that it was only "to be awarded in such years as produces a team whose standing is so preeminent as to make its selection as champion of America beyond dispute." Notre Dame was the first to be awarded the trophy, in 1924.

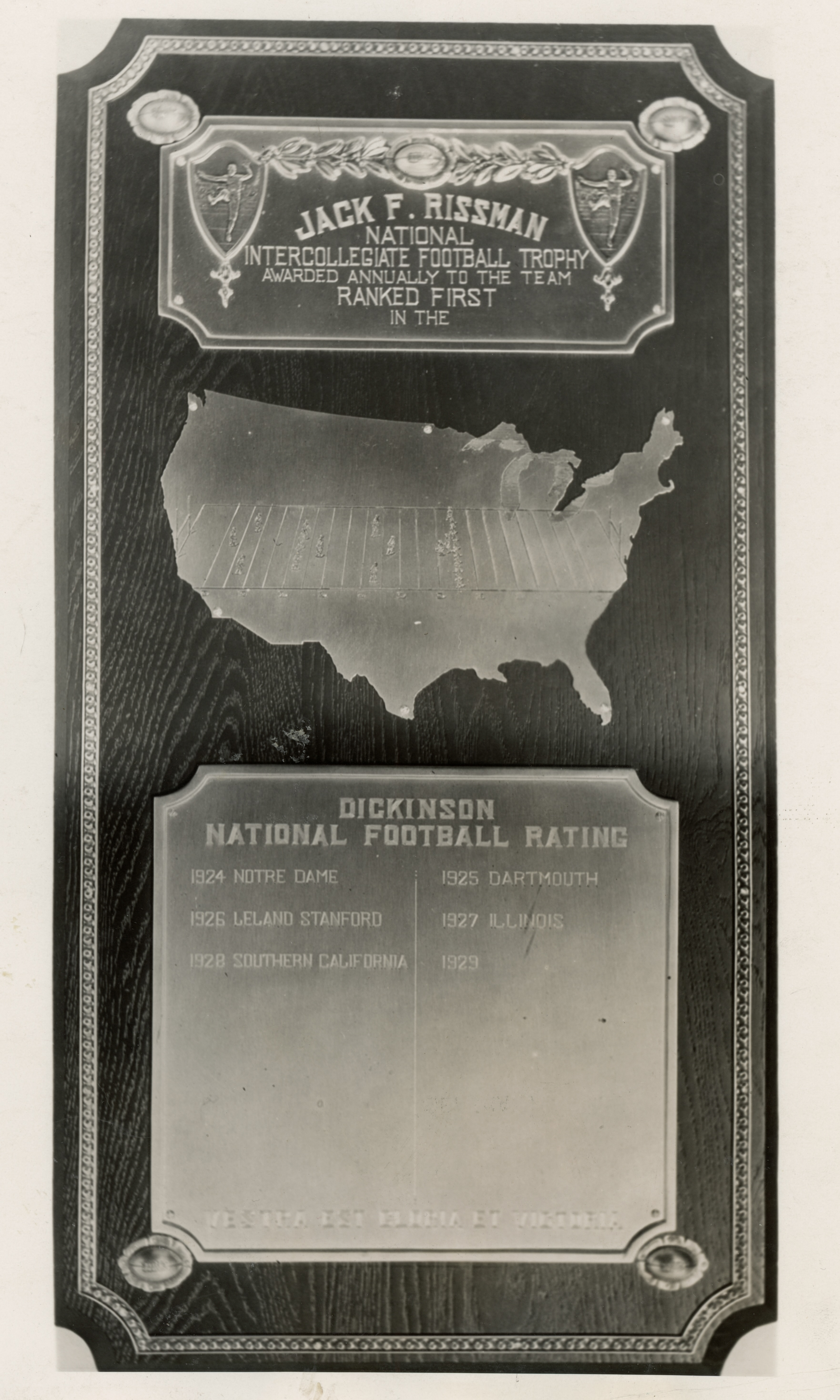
Jack F. Rissman Trophy, awarded to the team ranked first in the Dickinson System

Professor Frank G. Dickinson of Illinois developed the first mathematical ranking system to be widely popularized. Chicago clothing manufacturer Jack F. Rissman donated a trophy for the system's national championship in 1926 onward, first awarded to Stanford prior to their tie with Alabama in the Rose Bowl. A curious Knute Rockne, then coach of Notre Dame, convinced Dickinson and Rissman to backdate the Rissman Trophy two seasons; thus Notre Dame is engraved on the trophy for 1924 and Dartmouth for 1925. The Rissman Trophy was retired by Notre Dame's three wins in 1924, 1929, and 1930; the Knute Rockne Memorial Trophy was put into competition for 1931 following the untimely death of the legendary coach. The popularity of the Dickinson System kicked off a succession of mathematical rankings carried in newspapers and magazines such as the Houlgate System, Azzi Ratem rankings, Dunkel Power Index, Williamson System, and Litkenhous Ratings.

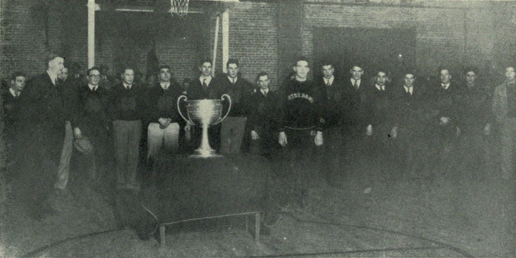
Notre Dame receiving the Albert Russel Erskine Trophy following the 1929 season.

Two short-lived national championship trophies were contemporaries of the Dickinson System awards. The Albert Russel Erskine Trophy was won twice by Notre Dame in 1929 and 1930, as voted by 250 sportswriters from around the country. The large silver Erskine trophy was last awarded to USC on the field in Pasadena following their "national championship game" victory over Tulane in the 1932 Rose Bowl. The Toledo Cup was meant to be a long-running traveling trophy, but was promptly permanently retired by Minnesota's threepeat in 1934, 1935, and 1936.

College football's foremost historian Parke H. Davis compiled a list of "National Champion Foot Ball Teams" for the 1934 edition of Spalding's Official Foot Ball Guide. Davis selected national champions for each year dating back to college football's inaugural season in 1869, for which he selected the sole competitors Princeton and Rutgers as co-champions. Similar retrospective analysis was undertaken in the 1940s by Bill Schroeder of the Helms Athletic Foundation and in Deke Houlgate's The Football Thesaurus in 1954.

The Associated Press (AP) began polling sportswriters in 1936 to obtain rankings. Alan J. Gould, the creator of the AP Poll, named Minnesota, Princeton, and SMU co-champions in 1935, and polled writers the following year, which resulted in a national championship for Minnesota. The AP's main competition, United Press (UP), created the first Coaches Poll in 1950. For that year and the next three, the AP and UP agreed on the national champion. The first "split" national championship between the major polls occurred in 1954, when the writers selected Ohio State and the coaches chose UCLA. The two polls have disagreed 11 times since 1950.

Both wire services originally conducted their final polls at the end of the regular season and prior to any bowl games being played. This changed when the AP Poll champion was crowned after the bowls for 1965 and then in 1968 onward. The Coaches Poll began awarding post-bowl championships in 1974. National champions crowned by pre-bowl polls who subsequently lost their bowl game offered an opportunity for other teams to claim the title based on different selectors' awards and rankings, such as the post-bowl FWAA Grantland Rice Award or Helms Athletic Foundation title.

Post-bowl polls allowed for the possibility of a "national championship game" to finally settle the question on the gridiron. But a number of challenges made it difficult to schedule even the season's top two teams to play in a single post-season bowl game, let alone all of the deserving teams. Calls for a college football playoff were frequently made by head coach Joe Paterno of Penn State, whose independent teams finished the 1968, 1969, and 1973 seasons unbeaten, untied, and with Orange Bowl victories yet were left without a single major national title.

The 1980s were marked by a succession of satisfying national championship games in the Orange Bowl and Fiesta Bowl, but the 1990s began with consecutive split AP Poll and Coaches Poll national titles in 1990 and 1991. The Bowl Coalition and then Bowl Alliance were formed to more reliably set up a No. 1 vs. No. 2 matchup in a bowl game on New Year's Day, but their efforts were hampered by the Rose Bowl's historic draw and contractual matchup between the Big Ten and Pac-10 conference champions.

The Bowl Championship Series in 1998 succeeded in finally bringing the Big Ten and Pac-10 into the fold with the other conferences for a combined BCS National Championship Game rotated among the Fiesta, Sugar, Orange, and Rose bowls and venues. BCS rankings originally incorporated the two major polls as well as a number of computer rankings to determine the end of season No. 1 vs. No. 2 matchup. Although the BCS era did regularly produce compelling matchups, the winnowing selection of the top two teams resulted in many BCS controversies, most notably 2003's split national championship caused by the BCS rankings leaving USC, No. 1 in both human polls, out of the Sugar Bowl. The BCS victors were annually awarded The Coaches' Trophy "crystal football" on the field immediately following the championship game.

In 2014 the College Football Playoff made its debut, facilitating a multi-game single-elimination tournament for the first time in college football history. Until 2024, four teams were seeded by a 13–member selection committee rather than by existing polls or mathematical rankings. The two semifinal games were rotated among the New Year's Six bowl games, and the final was played a week later. Beginning in 2024, the playoff field was expanded to 12 teams. The competition awards its own national championship trophy.

== NCAA records book ==
Although the National Collegiate Athletic Association (NCAA) has never bestowed national championships in college football at the topmost level, it does maintain an official records book for the sport. The records book, with consultation from various college football historians, contains a list of "major selectors" of national championships from throughout the history of college football, along with their championship selections.

=== Major selectors ===
While many people and organizations have named national champions throughout the years, the selectors below are listed in the official NCAA Football Bowl Subdivision Records book as being "major selectors" of national championships. The criterion for the NCAA's designation is that the poll or selector be "national in scope, either through distribution in newspaper, television, radio and/or computer online". Former selectors, deemed instrumental in the sport of college football, and selectors that were included for the calculation of the BCS standing, are listed together.

The NCAA records book divides its major selectors into three categories: those determined by mathematical formula, human polls, and historical research. The BCS is additionally categorized as a hybrid between math and polls, and the CFP as a playoff system.

==== Math ====
Many of the math selection systems were created during the 1920s and 1930s, beginning with Frank Dickinson's system, or during the dawn of the personal computer age in the 1990s. Selectors are listed below with years selected retroactively in italics.

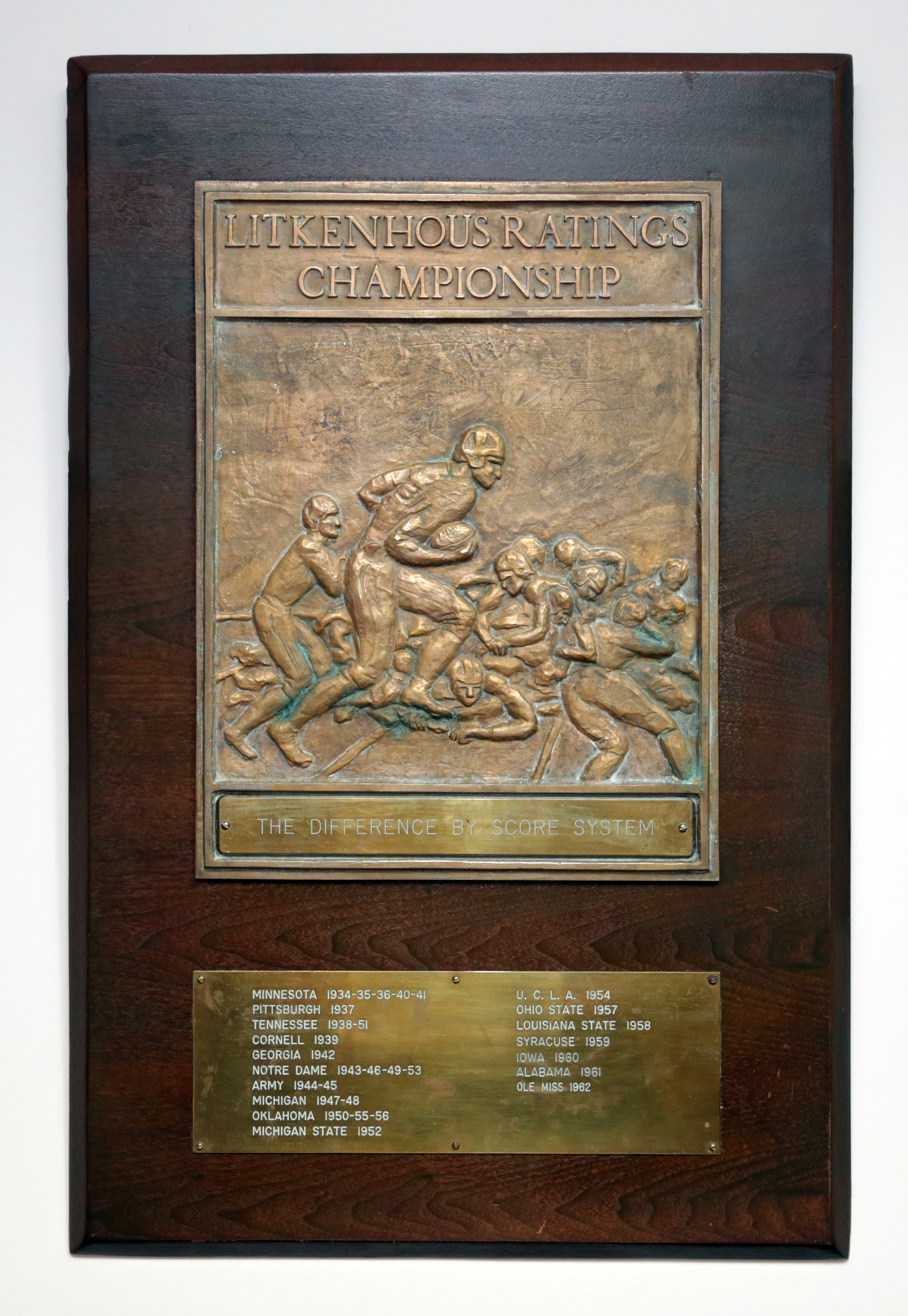
Litkenhous Ratings Championship trophy, 1934–1962

Selector	Name	Seasons	Trophy
A&H	Anderson & Hester (Note: The NCAA Football Bowl Subdivision Records book shows Anderson & Hester listed as "Seattle Times.")	1997–present	–
AS	Alderson System	1994–1998	–
B(QPRS)	Berryman (QPRS)	1920–1989, 1990–2011	–
BR	Billingsley Report (Note: The NCAA records books have contained four distinct sets of Billingsley Report national champions since the system's inclusion as a "major selector" in 1995. Billingsley made several changes to his system's formula over the years, most notably eliminating "Margin of Victory" as a BCS ranking component prior to the 2001 season. The details of the changes can be found at the system's dedicated article; all four sets of champions are included in the table below.)	1869–1969, 1970–2019	–
BS	Boand System	1919–1929, 1930–1960	Boand trophy
CCR	Congrove Computer Rankings	1993–present	–
CM	Colley Matrix	1992–present	–
CW	Caspar Whitney	1905–1907	–
DeS	DeVold System	1939–1944, 1945–2006	–
DiS	Dickinson System	1924–1940	Rissman trophy (1924–1925, 1926–1930); Rockne trophy (1931–1940)
DuS	Dunkel System	1929–2019	–
ERS	Eck Ratings System	1987–2005	–
HS	Houlgate System	1885–1926, 1927–1958	Foreman & Clark trophy
L	Litkenhous Ratings	1934–1978, 1981–1984	Litkenhous trophy (1934–1962)
MCFR	Massey College Football Ratings	1995–present	–
MGR	Matthews Grid Ratings	1966–1972, 1974–2006	–
NYT	The New York Times	1979–2004	–
PS	Poling System	1924–1934, 1935–1984	–
R(FACT)	Rothman (FACT)	1968–c.1970, c.1971–2006	–
SR	Sagarin Ratings	1919–1977, 1978–present	–
W	Wolfe	1992–present (Note: Wolfe did not provide rankings for the 2020 season, stating that there were not "enough games played to allow meaningful analysis," due to the COVID-19 pandemic.)	–
WS	Williamson System	1932–1963	–

==== Poll ====
The poll has been the dominant national champion selection method since the inception of the AP Poll in 1936. The National Football Foundation merged its poll with UPI from 1991 to 1992, with USA Today from 1993 to 1996, and with the FWAA since 2014.

For many years, the national champions of various polls were selected before the annual bowl games were played, by AP (1936–1964 and 1966–1967), Coaches Poll (1950–1973), FWAA (1954), and NFF (1959–1970). In all other latter-day polls, champions were selected after bowl games.

During the BCS era, the winner of the BCS Championship Game was automatically awarded the national championship of the Coaches Poll and the National Football Foundation.

Selectors are listed below with years selected retroactively in italics. Poll selections that constitute a "Consensus National Championship" in 1950 or later, as designated by the NCAA, are listed in bold.

Selector	Name	Seasons	Trophy
**AP**	Associated Press	1936–present	Associated Press Trophy; Williams Trophy (1941–1947); O'Donnell Trophy (1948–1956); Bryant Trophy (1957–1965); AP Trophy (1966–1977); Bryant Trophy (1978–1989); AP Trophy (1990–present)
**COACHES**; BRC; UP; UPI; USAT/CNN; USAT/ESPN; USAT	AFCA Coaches Poll; Blue Ribbon Commission; United Press; United Press International; USA Today/CNN; USA Today/ESPN; USA Today	1950–present, 1922–1949; 1922–1949 (Note: At the request of several schools, the AFCA established a "Blue Ribbon Commission" in 2016 to begin retroactively selecting AFCA national champions and Coaches' Trophy winners for 1922 through 1949. The trophy is awarded upon application by individual schools. Championship selections and trophies have been awarded to SMU for 1935, TCU for 1935 and 1938, Texas A&M for 1939, Oklahoma State for 1945, and Army for 1946.); 1950–1957 (Note: United Press first published their poll of coaches in 1950. International News Service published a separate poll between 1952 and 1957. In 1958 the two news agencies merged, and the Coaches Poll was published by United Press International from 1958 to 1990 until it was taken over by USA Today in 1991. UPI then published the National Football Foundation poll from 1991 to 1992 until it too was taken over by USA Today. Finally, UPI published a poll from 1993 to 1995 that was unaffiliated with either the Coaches Poll or NFF.); 1958–1990; 1991–1996 (Note: USA Today published its own Top 25 college football poll when the national magazine launched in 1982. In 1983 the poll took on CNN as a voting and broadcast partner. In 1991 USA Today / CNN took over the Coaches Poll from UPI. Between 1993 and 1996 USA Today additionally published the National Football Foundation poll. USA Today has published the Coaches Poll since 1991, with partners CNN from 1991 to 1996 and ESPN from 1997 to 2004.); 1997–2004; 2005–present	United Press Cup (1956–1958); UPI Trophy (1959–1985); The Coaches' Trophy (1986–present)
CFRA	College Football Researchers Association	1919–1981, 1982–1992, 2009–present	–
FN	Football News	1958–2002	–
**FWAA**; FWAA; FWAA-NFF	Football Writers Association of America; FWAA; FWAA-NFF Super 16	1954–present 1954–2013; 2014–present (Note: Since the beginning of the College Football Playoff era in 2014, the Football Writers Association of America and National Football Foundation have partnered to conduct the weekly FWAA-NFF Super 16 poll. The final FWAA-NFF poll is taken at the end of the regular season with the intention of influencing the CFP Selection Committee's playoff team selections. No poll is taken after the bowl games or CFP National Championship game and the FWAA-NFF poll does not award or name a national champion. The FWAA's Grantland Rice Award was retired following the 2013 season and the end of the BCS era. The NFF's MacArthur Bowl is now awarded after the season to the CFP national champion.)	Grantland Rice Award (1954–2013)
HICFP	Harris Interactive	2005–2013 (Note: The Harris Interactive College Football Poll was contracted by the BCS to help formulate its standings. It did not conduct a final poll following the BCS National Championship Game or award or name a national champion on its own, so is not included in the table of national championship selections.)	–
HAF	Helms Athletic Foundation	1883–1940, 1941–1982	–
INS	International News Service	1952–1957	–
NCF	National Championship Foundation	1869–1979, 1980–2000	–
**NFF**; NFF; UPI/NFF; USAT/NFF; NFF; FWAA-NFF	National Football Foundation; NFF; United Press International/NFF; USA Today/NFF; NFF; FWAA-NFF Super 16	1959–present 1959–1990; 1991–1992; 1993–1996; 1997–present (Note: From 1998 to 2013, the MacArthur Bowl was presented to the Bowl Championship Series national champion. Since 2014, it has been presented to the College Football Playoff national champion.); 2014–present	MacArthur Bowl
SN	Sporting News	1975–2006	–
**TOP25**; USAT; USAT/CNN	Top 25; USA Today; USA Today/CNN	1982–1990; 1982; 1983–1990	Top 25 trophy
**UPI**	United Press International	1993–1995	–

==== Research ====
College football historian Parke H. Davis is the only selector considered by the NCAA to have primarily used research in his selections. Davis published his work in the 1934 edition of Spalding's Foot Ball Guide, naming retroactive national champions for the years 1869 to 1932 while naming Michigan and Princeton (his alma mater) contemporary co-champions for the 1933 season. In all, he selected 94 teams over 61 seasons as "National Champion Foot Ball Teams". For 21 of these teams (at 12 schools), he was the only major selector to choose them. Their schools use 17 of Davis' singular selections to claim national titles. His work has been criticized for having a heavy Eastern bias, with little regard for the South and the West Coast.

Selector	Name	Seasons	Trophy
PD	Parke H. Davis	1869–1932, 1933	–

==== Hybrid ====
The Bowl Championship Series used a mathematical system that combined polls (Coaches and AP/Harris) and multiple computer rankings (including some individual selectors listed above) to determine a season ending matchup between its top two ranked teams in the BCS Championship Game. The champion of that game was contractually awarded the Coaches Poll and National Football Foundation championships.

Selector	Name	Seasons	Trophy
BCS	Bowl Championship Series	1998–2013	The Coaches' Trophy

==== Playoff ====
Unlike all selectors prior to 2014, the College Football Playoff does not use math, polls or research to select the participants. Rather, a 13-member committee selects and seeds the teams. The playoff system marked the first time any championship selector arranged a bracket competition to determine whom it would declare to be its champion.

Selector	Name	Seasons	Trophy
CFP	College Football Playoff	2014–present	CFP National Championship Trophy

=== Yearly national championship selections from major selectors ===
Below is a list of the national champions of college football since 1869 chosen by NCAA-designated "major selectors" listed in the official Football Bowl Subdivision Records publication.

Many teams did not have coaches as late as 1899. The first contemporaneous poll to include teams across the country and selection of a national champions can be traced to Caspar Whitney in 1901. The tie was removed from college football in 1995 and the last consensus champion with a tie in its record was Georgia Tech in 1990.

As designated by the official NCAA Football Bowl Subdivision Records publication:

- Champions included in this table are exclusively those named by an NCAA-designated "major selector" for the given year.
- Teams and selectors listed in italics indicate retroactively applied championships.
- Teams listed in **bold** reflect the selection by at least one of the following NCAA-designated "Consensus National Champion" selectors from 1950 onward: Associated Press, United Press/UPI, Football Writers Association of America, National Football Foundation, and USA Today.

A letter next to any season, team, record, coach or selector indicates a footnote that appears at the bottom of the table.

Season	Champion(s)	Record	Coach	Selector
1869	Princeton	1–1		BR, NCF, PD
1869	Rutgers	1–1		PD
1870	Princeton	1–0		BR, NCF, PD
1871	None	No games played		
1872	Princeton	1–0		BR, NCF, PD
1872	Yale	1–0		PD
1873	Princeton	2–0		BR, NCF, PD
1874	Harvard	1–1		PD
1874	Princeton	2–0		BR, PD
1874	Yale	3–0		NCF, PD
1875	Columbia	4–1–1		PD
1875	Harvard	4–0		NCF, PD
1875	Princeton	2–0		BR, PD
1876	Yale	3–0		BR, NCF, PD
1877	Princeton	2–0–1		BR, PD
1877	Yale	3–0–1		BR, NCF, PD
1878	Princeton	6–0		BR, NCF, PD
1879	Princeton	4–0–1		BR, NCF, PD
1879	Yale	3–0–2		PD
1880	Princeton	4–0–1		NCF, PD
1880	Yale	4–0–1		BR, NCF, PD
1881	Princeton	7–0–2		BR, PD
1881	Yale	5–0–1		NCF, PD
1882	Yale	8–0		BR, NCF, PD
1883	Yale	9–0		BR, HAF, NCF, PD
1884	Princeton	9–0–1		BR, PD
1884	Yale	8–0–1		BR, HAF, NCF, PD
1885	Princeton	9–0		BR, HAF, HS, NCF, PD
1886	Princeton	7–0–1		BR, PD
1886	Yale	9–0–1		BR, HAF, NCF, PD
1887	Yale	9–0		BR, HAF, HS, NCF, PD
1888	Yale	13–0	Walter Camp	BR, HAF, HS, NCF, PD
1889	Princeton	10–0		BR, HAF, HS, NCF, PD
1890	Harvard	11–0	George C. Adams, George A. Stewart	BR, HAF, HS, NCF, PD
1891	Yale	13–0	Walter Camp	BR, HAF, HS, NCF, PD
1892	Yale	13–0	Walter Camp	BR, HAF, HS, NCF, PD
1893	Princeton	11–0		BR, HAF, HS, NCF
1893	Yale	10–1	William Rhodes	PD
1894	Penn	12–0	George Washington Woodruff	PD
1894	Princeton	8–2		HS
1894	Yale	16–0	William Rhodes	BR, HAF, NCF, PD
1895	Penn	14–0	George Washington Woodruff	BR, HAF, HS, NCF, PD
1895	Yale	13–0–2	John A. Hartwell	PD
1896	Lafayette	11–0–1	Parke H. Davis	NCF, PD
1896	Princeton	10–0–1	Franklin Morse	BR, HAF, HS, NCF, PD
1897	Penn	15–0	George Washington Woodruff	BR, HAF, HS, NCF, PD
1897	Yale	9–0–2	Frank Butterworth	PD
1898	Harvard	11–0	William Cameron Forbes	BR, HAF, HS, NCF
1898	Princeton	11–0–1		PD
1899	Harvard	10–0–1	Benjamin Dibblee	BR, HAF, HS, NCF
1899	Princeton	12–1		BR, PD
1900	Yale	12–0	Malcolm McBride	BR, HAF, HS, NCF, PD
1901	Harvard	12–0	Bill Reid	BR, PD^{a}
1901	Michigan	11–0	Fielding H. Yost	BR, HAF, HS, NCF
1902	Michigan	11–0	Fielding H. Yost	BR, HAF, HS, NCF, PD
1902	Yale	11–0–1	Joseph Rockwell Swan	PD
1903	Michigan	11–0–1	Fielding H. Yost	BR, NCF
1903	Princeton	11–0	Art Hillebrand	BR, HAF, HS, NCF, PD
1904	Michigan	10–0	Fielding H. Yost	BR, NCF
1904	Minnesota	13–0	Henry Williams	BR
1904	Penn	12–0	Carl S. Williams	HAF, HS, NCF, PD
1905	Chicago	10–0	Amos Alonzo Stagg	BR, HAF, HS, NCF
1905	Yale	10–0	Jack Owsley	CW, PD
1906	Princeton	9–0–1	Bill Roper	HAF, NCF
1906	Vanderbilt	8–1	Dan McGugin	BR
1906	Yale	9–0–1	Foster Rockwell	BR, CW, PD
1907	Penn	11–1	Carl S. Williams	BR
1907	Yale	9–0–1	William F. Knox	BR, CW, HAF, HS, NCF, PD
1908	Harvard	9–0–1	Percy Haughton	BR
1908	LSU	10–0	Edgar Wingard	NCF
1908	Penn	11–0–1	Sol Metzger	BR, HAF, HS, NCF, PD
1909	Yale	10–0	Howard Jones	BR, HAF, HS, NCF, PD
1910	Auburn	6–1	Mike Donahue	BR
1910	Harvard	8–0–1	Percy Haughton	BR, HAF, HS, NCF
1910	Michigan	3–0–3	Fielding H. Yost	BR
1910	Pittsburgh	9–0	Joseph H. Thompson	NCF
1910	None	–	–	PD
1911	Minnesota	6–0–1	Henry L. Williams	BR
1911	Penn State	8–0–1	Bill Hollenback	NCF
1911	Princeton	8–0–2	Bill Roper	BR, HAF, HS, NCF, PD
1911	Vanderbilt	8–1	Dan McGugin	BR
1912	Harvard	9–0	Percy Haughton	BR, HAF, HS, NCF, PD
1912	Penn State	8–0	Bill Hollenback	NCF
1912	Wisconsin	7–0	William Juneau	BR
1913	Auburn	8–0	Mike Donahue	BR
1913	Chicago	7–0	Amos Alonzo Stagg	BR, PD
1913	Harvard	9–0	Percy Haughton	HAF, HS, NCF, PD
1914	Army	9–0	Charles Daly	HAF, HS, NCF, PD
1914	Illinois	7–0	Robert Zuppke	BR, PD
1914	Texas	8–0	Dave Allerdice	BR
1915	Cornell	9–0	Albert Sharpe	HAF, HS, NCF, PD
1915	Minnesota	6–0–1	Henry L. Williams	BR
1915	Nebraska	8–0	Ewald O. Stiehm	BR
1915	Oklahoma	10–0	Bennie Owen	BR
1915	Pittsburgh	8–0	Pop Warner	PD
1916	Army	9–0	Charles Daly	PD
1916	Georgia Tech	8–0–1	John Heisman	BR
1916	Pittsburgh	8–0	Pop Warner	BR, HAF, HS, NCF, PD
1917	Georgia Tech	9–0	John Heisman	BR, HAF, HS, NCF
1918	Michigan	5–0	Fielding H. Yost	BR, NCF
1918	Pittsburgh	4–1	Pop Warner	HAF, HS, NCF
1919	Centre	9–0	Charley Moran	SR
1919	Harvard	9–0–1	Bob Fisher	CFRA, HAF, HS, NCF, PD
1919	Illinois	6–1	Robert Zuppke	BR, BS, CFRA, PD, SR
1919	Notre Dame	9–0	Knute Rockne	NCF, PD
1919	Texas A&M	10–0	Dana X. Bible	BR, NCF
1920	California	9–0	Andy Smith	CFRA, HAF, HS, NCF, SR
1920	Georgia	8–0–1	Herman Stegeman	B(QPRS)
1920	Harvard	8–0–1	Bob Fisher	BS
1920	Notre Dame	9–0	Knute Rockne	BR, PD
1920	Princeton	6–0–1	Bill Roper	BS, PD
1921	California	9–0–1	Andy Smith	BR, BS, CFRA, SR
1921	Cornell	8–0	Gil Dobie	HAF, HS, NCF, PD
1921	Iowa	7–0	Howard Jones	BR, PD
1921	Lafayette	9–0	Jock Sutherland	BS, PD
1921	Vanderbilt	7–0–1	Dan McGugin	B(QPRS)
1921	Washington & Jefferson	10–0–1	Greasy Neale	BS
1922	California	9–0	Andy Smith	BR, HS, NCF, SR
1922	Cornell	8–0	Gil Dobie	HAF, PD
1922	Iowa	7–0	Howard Jones	BR
1922	Princeton	8–0	Bill Roper	BS, CFRA, NCF, PD, SR
1922	Vanderbilt	8–0–1	Dan McGugin	B(QPRS)
1923	California	9–0–1	Andy Smith	HS
1923	Cornell	8–0	Gil Dobie	SR
1923	Illinois	8–0	Robert Zuppke	BS, CFRA, HAF, NCF, PD, SR, B(QPRS)
1923	Michigan	8–0	Fielding H. Yost	BR, NCF
1923	Yale	8–0	Tad Jones	B(QPRS)
1924	Notre Dame	10–0	Knute Rockne	BR, BS, CFRA, DiS, HAF, HS, NCF, PS, SR, B(QPRS)
1924	Penn	9–1–1	Lou Young	PD
1925	Alabama	10–0	Wallace Wade	BR, BS, CFRA, HAF, HS, NCF, PS, SR, B(QPRS)
1925	Dartmouth	8–0	Jesse Hawley	DiS, PD
1925	Michigan	7–1	Fielding H. Yost	SR
1926	Alabama	9–0–1	Wallace Wade	BR, CFRA, HAF, NCF, PS, B(QPRS)
1926	Lafayette	9–0	Herb McCracken	PD
1926	Michigan	7–1	Fielding H. Yost	SR
1926	Navy	9–0–1	Bill Ingram	BS, HS
1926	Stanford	10–0–1	Pop Warner	DiS, HAF, NCF, SR
1927	Georgia	9–1	George Cecil Woodruff	BS, PS, B(QPRS)
1927	Illinois	7–0–1	Robert Zuppke	BR, DiS, HAF, NCF, PD
1927	Notre Dame	7–1–1	Knute Rockne	HS
1927	Texas A&M	8–0–1	Dana X. Bible	SR
1927	Yale	7–1	Thomas Jones	BS, CFRA
1928	Detroit	9–0	Gus Dorais	PD
1928	Georgia Tech	10–0	William Alexander	BR, BS, CFRA, HAF, HS, NCF, PD, PS, SR, B(QPRS)
1928	USC	9–0–1	Howard Jones	DiS, SR
1929	Notre Dame	9–0	Knute Rockne	BR, BS, CFRA, DiS, DuS, HAF, NCF, PS, SR
1929	Pittsburgh	9–1	Jock Sutherland	PD
1929	USC	10–2	Howard Jones	HS, SR, B(QPRS)
1930	Alabama	10–0	Wallace Wade	CFRA, PD, SR, B(QPRS)
1930	Notre Dame	10–0	Knute Rockne	BR, BS, DiS, DuS, HAF, HS, NCF, PD, PS
1931	Pittsburgh	8–1	Jock Sutherland	PD
1931	Purdue	9–1	Noble Kizer	PD
1931	USC	10–1	Howard Jones	BR, BS, CFRA, DiS, DuS, HAF, HS, NCF, PS, SR, B(QPRS)
1932	Colgate	9–0	Andrew Kerr	PD
1932	Michigan	8–0	Harry Kipke	DiS, PD, SR
1932	USC	10–0	Howard Jones	BR, BS, CFRA, DuS, HAF, HS, NCF, PD, PS, SR, WS, B(QPRS)
1933	Michigan	7–0–1	Harry Kipke	BR, BS, CFRA, DiS, HAF, HS, NCF, PD, PS, SR, B(QPRS)
1933	Ohio State	7–1	Sam Willaman	DuS
1933	Princeton	9–0	Fritz Crisler	PD
1933	USC	10–1–1	Howard Jones	WS
1934	Alabama	10–0	Frank Thomas	BR, DuS, HS, PS, WS, B(QPRS)
1934	Minnesota	8–0	Bernie Bierman	BR, BS, CFRA, DiS, HAF, L, NCF, SR
1935	Minnesota	8–0	Bernie Bierman	BR, BS, CFRA, HAF, L, NCF, PS
1935	Princeton	9–0	Fritz Crisler	DuS
1935	SMU	12–1	Matty Bell	BRC, DiS, HS, SR, B(QPRS)
1935	TCU	12–1	Dutch Meyer	BRC, WS^{l}
1936	Duke	9–1	Wallace Wade	B(QPRS)
1936	LSU	9–1–1	Bernie Moore	SR
1936	Minnesota	7–1	Bernie Bierman	AP, BR, DiS, DuS, HAF, L, NCF, PS, WS^{m}
1936	Pittsburgh	8–1–1	Jock Sutherland	BS, CFRA, HS
1937	California	10–0–1	Stub Allison	DuS, HAF, WS^{n}
1937	Pittsburgh	9–0–1	Jock Sutherland	AP, BR, BS, CFRA, DiS, HS, L, NCF, PS, SR, B(QPRS)
1938	Notre Dame	8–1	Elmer Layden	DiS
1938	TCU	11–0	Dutch Meyer	AP, BRC, HAF, NCF, WS^{o}
1938	Tennessee	11–0	Robert Neyland	B(QPRS), BR, BS, CFRA, DuS, HS, L, PS, SR, WS^{o}
1939	Cornell	8–0	Carl Snavely	BR, L, SR
1939	Texas A&M	11–0	Homer Norton	AP, BR, BRC, BS, CFRA, DeS, DuS, HAF, HS, NCF, PS, SR, WS, B(QPRS)
1939	USC	8–0–2	Howard Jones	DiS
1940	Minnesota	8–0	Bernie Bierman	AP, B(QPRS), BR, BS, CFRA, DeS, DiS, HS, L, NCF, SR
1940	Stanford	10–0	Clark Shaughnessy	BR, HAF, PS, WS^{p}
1940	Tennessee	10–1	Robert Neyland	DuS
1941	Alabama	9–2	Frank Thomas	HS
1941	Minnesota	8–0	Bernie Bierman	AP, BR, BS, CFRA, DeS, DuS, HAF, L, NCF, PS, SR
1941	Texas	8–1–1	Dana X. Bible	B(QPRS), WS
1942	Georgia	11–1	Wally Butts	B(QPRS), BR, DeS, HS, L, PS, SR, WS
1942	Ohio State	9–1	Paul Brown	AP, BR, BS, DuS, CFRA, NCF
1942	Wisconsin	8–1–1	Harry Stuhldreher	HAF
1943	Notre Dame	9–1	Frank Leahy	AP, B(QPRS), BR, BS, CFRA, DeS, DuS, HAF, HS, L, NCF, PS, SR, WS
1944	Army	9–0	Earl Blaik	AP, B(QPRS), BR,^{q} BS, CFRA, DeS, DuS, HAF, HS, L, NCF, PS, SR, WS
1944	Ohio State	9–0	Carroll Widdoes	BR,^{q} NCF, SR
1945	Alabama	10–0	Frank Thomas	NCF
1945	Army	9–0	Earl Blaik	AP, B(QPRS), BR,^{q} BS, CFRA, DeS, DuS, HAF, HS, L, NCF, PS, SR, WS
1945	Oklahoma A&M	9–0	Jim Lookabaugh	BRC
1946	Army	9–0–1	Earl Blaik	BR, BRC, BS, CFRA, HAF, HS, PS
1946	Georgia	11–0	Wally Butts	WS
1946	Notre Dame	8–0–1	Frank Leahy	AP, B(QPRS), BR, BS, DeS, DuS, HAF, L, NCF, PS, SR
1947	Michigan	10–0	Fritz Crisler	B(QPRS), BR, BS, CFRA, DeS, DuS, HAF, HS, L, NCF, PS, SR
1947	Notre Dame	9–0	Frank Leahy	AP, HAF, WS
1948	Michigan	9–0	Bennie Oosterbaan	AP, B(QPRS), BR, BS, CFRA, DeS, DuS, HAF, HS, L, NCF, PS, SR, WS
1949	Notre Dame	10–0	Frank Leahy	AP, B(QPRS), BR, BS, DeS, DuS, HAF, HS, L, NCF, PS, SR, WS
1949	Oklahoma	11–0	Bud Wilkinson	BR, CFRA
1950	Kentucky	11–1	Paul "Bear" Bryant	SR
1950	**Oklahoma**	10–1	Bud Wilkinson	**AP**, B(QPRS), HAF, L, **UP**, WS
1950	Princeton	9–0	Charley Caldwell	BS, PS
1950	Tennessee	11–1	Robert Neyland	BR, CFRA, DeS, DuS, HS, NCF, SR
1951	Georgia Tech	11–0–1	Bobby Dodd	B(QPRS), BS, HS
1951	Illinois	9–0–1	Ray Eliot	BS
1951	Maryland	10–0	Jim Tatum	BR, CFRA, DeS, DuS, NCF, SR
1951	Michigan State	9–0	Biggie Munn	BR, HAF, PS
1951	**Tennessee**	10–1	Robert Neyland	**AP**, L, **UP**, WS
1952	Georgia Tech	12–0	Bobby Dodd	B(QPRS), BR, HS, INS, PS, SR
1952	**Michigan State**	9–0	Biggie Munn	**AP**, BR, BS, CFRA, DeS, DuS, HAF, L, NCF, SR, **UP**, WS
1953	**Maryland**	10–1	Jim Tatum	**AP**, INS, **UP**
1953	Notre Dame	9–0–1	Frank Leahy	BR, BS, DeS, DuS, HAF, HS, L, NCF, PS, SR, WS
1953	Oklahoma	9–1–1	Bud Wilkinson	B(QPRS), CFRA
1954	**Ohio State**	10–0	Woody Hayes	**AP**, B(QPRS), BR, BS, CFRA, DeS, HAF, HS, INS, NCF, PS, SR, WS
1954	**UCLA**	9–0	Henry Sanders	BR, CFRA, DuS, **FWAA**, HAF, L, NCF, **UP**
1955	Michigan State	9–1	Duffy Daugherty	BS
1955	**Oklahoma**	11–0	Bud Wilkinson	**AP**, B(QPRS), BR, CFRA, DeS, DuS, **FWAA**, HAF, HS, INS, L, NCF, PS, SR, **UP**, WS
1956	Georgia Tech	10–1	Bobby Dodd	B(QPRS), HS, SR
1956	Iowa	9–1	Forest Evashevski	CFRA
1956	**Oklahoma**	10–0	Bud Wilkinson	**AP**, BR, BS, DeS, DuS, **FWAA**, HAF, INS, L, NCF, PS, SR, **UP**, WS
1956	Tennessee	10–1	Bowden Wyatt	SR
1957	**Auburn**	10–0	Ralph Jordan	**AP**, BR, CFRA, HAF, HS, NCF, PS, SR, WS
1957	Michigan State	8–1	Duffy Daugherty	BR, DuS
1957	**Ohio State**	9–1	Woody Hayes	BS, DeS, **FWAA**, INS, L, **UP**
1957	Oklahoma	10–1	Bud Wilkinson	B(QPRS)
1958	**Iowa**	8–1–1	Forest Evashevski	**FWAA**
1958	**LSU**	11–0	Paul Dietzel	**AP**, B(QPRS), BR, BS, CFRA, DeS, DuS, FN, HAF, HS, L, NCF, PS, SR, **UPI**, WS
1959	Ole Miss	10–1	Johnny Vaught	B(QPRS), BR, DuS, SR
1959	**Syracuse**	11–0	Ben Schwartzwalder	**AP**, BR, BS, CFRA, DeS, FN, **FWAA**, HAF, L, NCF, **NFF**, PS, SR, **UPI**, WS
1960	Iowa	8–1	Forest Evashevski	B(QPRS), BR, BS, L, SR
1960	**Minnesota**	8–2	Murray Warmath	**AP**, FN, **NFF**, **UPI**
1960	**Ole Miss**	10–0–1	Johnny Vaught	BR, CFRA, DeS, DuS, **FWAA**, NCF, WS
1960	Missouri	11–0^{r}	Dan Devine	PS
1960	Washington	10–1	Jim Owens	HAF
1961	**Alabama**	11–0	Paul "Bear" Bryant	**AP**, B(QPRS), BR, CFRA, DeS, DuS, FN, HAF, L, NCF, **NFF**, SR, **UPI**, WS
1961	**Ohio State**	8–0–1	Woody Hayes	**FWAA**, PS
1962	Alabama	10–1	Paul "Bear" Bryant	BR
1962	LSU	9–1–1	Charles McClendon	B(QPRS)
1962	Ole Miss	10–0	Johnny Vaught	BR, L, SR
1962	**USC**	11–0	John McKay	**AP**, B(QPRS), CFRA, DeS, DuS, FN, **FWAA**, HAF, NCF, **NFF**, PS, **UPI**, WS
1963	**Texas**	11–0	Darrell Royal	**AP**, B(QPRS), BR, CFRA, DeS, DuS, FN, **FWAA**, HAF, L, NCF, **NFF**, PS, SR, **UPI**, WS
1964	**Alabama**	10–1	Paul "Bear" Bryant	**AP**, B(QPRS), L, **UPI**
1964	**Arkansas**	11–0	Frank Broyles	BR, CFRA, **FWAA**, HAF, NCF, PS, SR
1964	Michigan	9–1	Bump Elliott	DuS
1964	**Notre Dame**	9–1	Ara Parseghian	DeS, FN, **NFF**
1965	**Alabama**	9–1–1	Paul "Bear" Bryant	**AP**, BR, CFRA, **FWAA**, NCF
1965	**Michigan State**	10–1	Duffy Daugherty	B(QPRS), BR, DeS, DuS, FN, **FWAA**, HAF, L, **NFF**, PS, SR, **UPI**
1966	Alabama	11–0	Paul "Bear" Bryant	B(QPRS), SR
1966	**Michigan State**	9–0–1	Duffy Daugherty	CFRA, HAF, **NFF**, PS
1966	**Notre Dame**	9–0–1	Ara Parseghian	**AP**, BR, DeS, DuS, FN, **FWAA**, HAF, L, MGR, NCF, **NFF**, PS, SR, **UPI**
1967	Notre Dame	8–2	Ara Parseghian	DuS
1967	Oklahoma	10–1	Chuck Fairbanks	PS
1967	**USC**	10–1	John McKay	**AP**, B(QPRS), BR, CFRA, DeS, FN, **FWAA**, HAF, MGR, NCF, **NFF**, SR, **UPI**
1967	Tennessee	9–2	Doug Dickey	L
1968	Georgia	8–1–2	Vince Dooley	L
1968	**Ohio State**	10–0	Woody Hayes	**AP**, B(QPRS), BR, CFRA, DuS, FN, **FWAA**, HAF, NCF, **NFF**, PS, R(FACT), SR, **UPI**
1968	Texas	9–1–1	Darrell Royal	DeS, MGR, SR
1969	Ohio State	8–1	Woody Hayes	MGR
1969	Penn State	11–0	Joe Paterno	R(FACT), SR
1969	**Texas**	11–0	Darrell Royal	**AP**, B(QPRS), BR, CFRA, DeS, DuS, FN, **FWAA**, HAF, L, NCF, **NFF**, PS, R(FACT), SR, **UPI**
1970	Arizona State	11–0	Frank Kush	PS
1970	**Nebraska**	11–0–1	Bob Devaney	**AP**, BR, CFRA, DeS, DuS, FN, **FWAA**, HAF, NCF, R(FACT), SR
1970	Notre Dame	10–1	Ara Parseghian	MGR, R(FACT), SR
1970	**Ohio State**	9–1	Woody Hayes	**NFF**
1970	**Texas**	10–1	Darrell Royal	B(QPRS), L, **NFF**, R(FACT), **UPI**
1971	**Nebraska**	13–0	Bob Devaney	**AP**, B(QPRS), BR, CFRA, DeS, DuS, FN, **FWAA**, HAF, L, MGR, NCF, **NFF**, PS, R(FACT), SR, **UPI**
1972	**USC**	12–0	John McKay	**AP**, B(QPRS), BR, CFRA, DeS, DuS, FN, **FWAA**, HAF, L, MGR, NCF, **NFF**, PS, R(FACT), SR, **UPI**
1973	**Alabama**	11–1	Paul "Bear" Bryant	B(QPRS), L, **UPI**
1973	Michigan	10–0–1	Bo Schembechler	NCF, PS
1973	**Notre Dame**	11–0	Ara Parseghian	**AP**, BR, FN, **FWAA**, HAF, NCF, **NFF**
1973	Ohio State	10–0–1	Woody Hayes	NCF, PS, R(FACT), SR
1973	Oklahoma	10–0–1	Barry Switzer	BR, CFRA, DeS, DuS, SR
1974	Ohio State	10–2	Woody Hayes	MGR
1974	**Oklahoma**	11–0	Barry Switzer	**AP**, B(QPRS), BR, CFRA, DeS, DuS, FN, HAF, L, NCF, PS, R(FACT), SR
1974	**USC**	10–1–1	John McKay	**FWAA**, HAF, NCF, **NFF**, **UPI**
1975	Alabama	11–1	Paul "Bear" Bryant	MGR
1975	Arizona State	12–0	Frank Kush	NCF, SN
1975	Ohio State	11–1	Woody Hayes	B(QPRS), HAF, L, MGR, PS, R(FACT)
1975	**Oklahoma**	11–1	Barry Switzer	**AP**, BR, CFRA, DeS, DuS, FN, **FWAA**, HAF, NCF, **NFF**, R(FACT), SR, **UPI**
1976	Michigan	10–2	Bo Schembechler	L
1976	**Pittsburgh**	12–0	Johnny Majors	**AP**, BR, FN, **FWAA**, HAF, NCF, **NFF**, PS, R(FACT), SN, SR, **UPI**
1976	USC	11–1	John Robinson	B(QPRS), BR, CFRA, DeS, DuS, MGR
1977	Alabama	11–1	Paul "Bear" Bryant	CFRA
1977	Arkansas	11–1	Lou Holtz	R(FACT)
1977	**Notre Dame**	11–1	Dan Devine	**AP**, BR, CFRA, DeS, DuS, FN, **FWAA**, HAF, MGR, NCF, **NFF**, PS, R(FACT), SN, SR, **UPI**
1977	Texas	11–1	Fred Akers	B(QPRS), L, R(FACT), SR
1978	**Alabama**	11–1	Paul "Bear" Bryant	**AP**, CFRA, **FWAA**, HAF, NCF, **NFF**, R(FACT)
1978	Oklahoma	11–1	Barry Switzer	BR, DeS, DuS, HAF, L, MGR, PS, R(FACT), SR
1978	**USC**	12–1	John Robinson	B(QPRS), BR, FN, HAF, NCF, R(FACT), SN, SR, **UPI**
1979	**Alabama**	12–0	Paul "Bear" Bryant	**AP**, B(QPRS), BR, DeS, DuS, FN, **FWAA**, HAF, MGR, NCF, **NFF**, NYT, PS, R(FACT), SN, SR, **UPI**
1979	USC	11–0–1	John Robinson	CFRA
1980	Florida State	10–2	Bobby Bowden	R(FACT)
1980	**Georgia**	12–0	Vince Dooley	**AP**, B(QPRS), BR, FN, **FWAA**, HAF, NCF, **NFF**, PS, R(FACT), SN, SR, **UPI**
1980	Nebraska	10–2	Tom Osborne	R(FACT)
1980	Oklahoma	10–2	Barry Switzer	BR, DuS, MGR
1980	Pittsburgh	11–1	Jackie Sherrill	CFRA, DeS, NYT, R(FACT), SR
1981	**Clemson**	12–0	Danny Ford	**AP**, B(QPRS), BR, CFRA, DeS, FN, **FWAA**, HAF, L, MGR, NCF, **NFF**, NYT, PS, R(FACT), SN, SR, **UPI**
1981	Nebraska	9–3	Tom Osborne	NCF
1981	Penn State	10–2	Joe Paterno	DuS
1981	Pittsburgh	11–1	Jackie Sherrill	NCF
1981	SMU	10–1	Ron Meyer	NCF
1981	Texas	10–1–1	Fred Akers	NCF
1982	Nebraska	12–1	Tom Osborne	B(QPRS), L
1982	**Penn State**	11–1	Joe Paterno	**AP**, BR, CFRA, DeS, DuS, FN, **FWAA**, HAF, MGR, NCF, **NFF**, NYT, PS, R(FACT), SN, SR, **UPI**, **USAT**
1982	SMU	11–0–1	Bobby Collins	HAF
1983	Auburn	11–1	Pat Dye	BR, CFRA, NYT, R(FACT), SR
1983	**Miami (FL)**	11–1	Howard Schnellenberger	**AP**, BR, DuS, FN, **FWAA**, NCF, **NFF**, SN, **UPI**, **USAT/CNN**
1983	Nebraska	12–1	Tom Osborne	B(QPRS), DeS, L, MGR, PS, R(FACT), SR
1984	**BYU**	13–0	LaVell Edwards	**AP**, BR, CFRA, **FWAA**, NCF, **NFF**, PS, SR, **UPI**, **USAT/CNN**
1984	Florida	9–1–1	Galen Hall	BR, DeS, DuS, MGR, NYT, R(FACT), SN, SR
1984	Nebraska	10–2	Tom Osborne	L
1984	Washington	11–1	Don James	B(QPRS), FN, NCF
1985	Florida	9–1–1	Galen Hall	SR
1985	Michigan	10–1–1	Bo Schembechler	MGR
1985	**Oklahoma**	11–1	Barry Switzer	**AP**, B(QPRS), BR, CFRA, DeS, DuS, FN, **FWAA**, NCF, **NFF**, NYT, R(FACT), SN, **UPI**, **USAT/CNN**
1986	Miami (FL)	11–1	Jimmy Johnson	R(FACT)
1986	Oklahoma	11–1	Barry Switzer	BR, B(QPRS), CFRA, DeS, DuS, NYT, SR
1986	**Penn State**	12–0	Joe Paterno	**AP**, BR, FN, **FWAA**, MGR, NCF, **NFF**, R(FACT), SN, SR, **UPI**, **USAT/CNN**
1987	Florida State	11–1	Bobby Bowden	B(QPRS)
1987	**Miami (FL)**	12–0	Jimmy Johnson	**AP**, BR, CFRA, DeS, DuS, ERS, FN, **FWAA**, MGR, NCF, **NFF**, NYT, R(FACT), SN, SR, **UPI**, **USAT/CNN**
1988	Miami (FL)	11–1	Jimmy Johnson	B(QPRS)
1988	**Notre Dame**	12–0	Lou Holtz	**AP**, BR, CFRA, DeS, DuS, ERS, FN, **FWAA**, MGR, NCF, **NFF**, NYT, R(FACT), SN, SR, **UPI**, **USAT/CNN**
1989	Florida State	10–2	Bobby Bowden	BR
1989	**Miami (FL)**	11–1	Dennis Erickson	**AP**, BR, CFRA, DeS, DuS, FN, **FWAA**, MGR, NCF, **NFF**, NYT, R(FACT), SN, **UPI**, **USAT/CNN**
1989	Notre Dame	12–1	Lou Holtz	B(QPRS), ERS, R(FACT), SR
1990	**Colorado**	11–1–1	Bill McCartney	**AP**, B(QPRS), BR, CFRA, DeS, FN, **FWAA**, MGR, NCF, **NFF**, R(FACT), SN, **USAT/CNN**
1990	**Georgia Tech**	11–0–1	Bobby Ross	DuS, NCF, R(FACT), SR, **UPI**
1990	Miami (FL)	10–2	Dennis Erickson	BR, ERS, NYT, R(FACT), SR
1990	Washington	10–2	Don James	R(FACT)
1991	**Miami (FL)**	12–0	Dennis Erickson	**AP**, BR, CFRA, ERS, NCF, NYT, SN, SR
1991	**Washington**	12–0	Don James	B(QPRS), BR, DeS, DuS, FN, **FWAA**, MGR, NCF, R(FACT), SR, **UPI/NFF**, **USAT/CNN**
1992	**Alabama**	13–0	Gene Stallings	**AP**, B(QPRS), BR, CFRA, DeS, DuS, ERS, FN, **FWAA**, MGR, NCF, NYT, R(FACT), SN, SR, **UPI/NFF**, **USAT/CNN**
1992	Florida State	11–1	Bobby Bowden	SR
1993	Auburn	11–0	Terry Bowden	NCF
1993	**Florida State**	12–1	Bobby Bowden	**AP**, B(QPRS), BR, CCR, DeS, DuS, ERS, FN, **FWAA**, NCF, NYT, R(FACT), SN, SR, **UPI**, **USAT/CNN**, **USAT/NFF**
1993	Nebraska	11–1	Tom Osborne	NCF
1993	Notre Dame	11–1	Lou Holtz	MGR, NCF
1994	Florida State	10–1–1	Bobby Bowden	DuS
1994	**Nebraska**	13–0	Tom Osborne	**AP**, AS, B(QPRS), BR, FN, **FWAA**, NCF, R(FACT), SN, SR, **UPI**, **USAT/CNN**, **USAT/NFF**
1994	Penn State	12–0	Joe Paterno	BR, CCR, DeS, ERS, MGR, NCF, NYT, R(FACT), SR
1995	**Nebraska**	12–0	Tom Osborne	**AP**, AS, B(QPRS), BR, CCR, DeS, DuS, ERS, FN, **FWAA**, MCFR, MGR, NCF, **NFF**, NYT, R(FACT), SN, SR, **UPI**, **USAT/CNN**
1996	**Florida**	12–1	Steve Spurrier	**AP**, B(QPRS), BR, CCR, DeS, DuS, ERS, FN, **FWAA**, MCFR, MGR, NCF, **NFF**, NYT, R(FACT), SN, SR, **USAT/CNN**
1996	Florida State	11–1	Bobby Bowden	AS
1997	**Michigan**	12–0	Lloyd Carr	**AP**, BR, FN, **FWAA**, NCF, **NFF**, SN
1997	**Nebraska**	13–0	Tom Osborne	A&H, AS, B(QPRS), BR, CCR, DeS, DuS, ERS, MCFR, MGR, NCF, NYT, R(FACT), SR, **USAT/ESPN**
1998	**Tennessee**	13–0	Phillip Fulmer	A&H, **AP**, AS, B(QPRS), BCS, BR, CCR, CM, DeS, DuS, ERS, FN, **FWAA**, MCFR, MGR, NCF, **NFF**, NYT, R(FACT), SN, SR, **USAT/ESPN**
1999	**Florida State**	12–0	Bobby Bowden	A&H, **AP**, B(QPRS), BCS, BR, CCR, CM, DeS, DuS, ERS, FN, **FWAA**, MCFR, MGR, NCF, **NFF**, NYT, R(FACT), SN, SR, **USAT/ESPN**
2000	Miami (FL)	11–1	Butch Davis	NYT
2000	**Oklahoma**	13–0	Bob Stoops	A&H, **AP**, B(QPRS), BCS, BR, CCR, CM, DeS, DuS, ERS, FN, **FWAA**, MCFR, MGR, NCF, **NFF**, R(FACT), SN, SR, **USAT/ESPN**
2001	**Miami (FL)**	12–0	Larry Coker	A&H, **AP**, B(QPRS), BCS, BR, CCR, CM, DeS, DuS, ERS, FN, **FWAA**, MCFR, MGR, **NFF**, NYT, R(FACT), SN, SR, **USAT/ESPN**, W
2002	**Ohio State**	14–0	Jim Tressel	A&H, **AP**, B(QPRS), BCS, BR, CCR, CM, DeS, ERS, FN, **FWAA**, MCFR, **NFF**, NYT, R(FACT), SN, SR, **USAT/ESPN**, W
2002	USC	11–2	Pete Carroll	DuS, MGR, SR
2003	**LSU**	13–1	Nick Saban	A&H, BCS, BR, CM, DeS, DuS, MCFR, **NFF**, R(FACT), SR, **USAT/ESPN**, W
2003	Oklahoma	12–2	Bob Stoops	B(QPRS)
2003	**USC**	12–1	Pete Carroll	**AP**, CCR,^{e} ERS, **FWAA**, MGR, NYT, SN
2004	USC^{b}	11–0^{c}	Pete Carroll	A&H, **AP**, B(QPRS), BR, CCR, CM, DeS, DuS, ERS, MCFR, MGR, **NFF**, NYT, R(FACT), SN, SR, W
2004	Vacated^{b}	–	–	BCS, **FWAA**, **USAT/ESPN**
2005	**Texas**	13–0	Mack Brown	A&H, **AP**, B(QPRS), BCS, BR, CCR, CM, DeS, DuS, ERS, **FWAA**, MCFR, MGR, **NFF**, R(FACT), SN, SR, **USAT**, W
2006	**Florida**	13–1	Urban Meyer	A&H, **AP**, B(QPRS), BCS, BR, CCR, CM, DuS, **FWAA**, MCFR, MGR, **NFF**, R(FACT), SN, SR, **USAT**, W
2006	Ohio State	12–1	Jim Tressel	DeS,^{f} R(FACT)^{g}
2007	**LSU**	12–2	Les Miles	**AP**, B(QPRS), BCS, BR, CCR, CM, **FWAA**, MCFR, **NFF**, SR, **USAT**, W
2007	Missouri	12–2	Gary Pinkel	A&H^{j}
2007	USC	11–2	Pete Carroll	DuS^{d}
2008	**Florida**	13–1	Urban Meyer	**AP**, B(QPRS), BCS, BR, CCR, CM, DuS, **FWAA**, MCFR, **NFF**, SR, **USAT**
2008	Utah	13–0	Kyle Whittingham	A&H, W^{h}
2009	**Alabama**	14–0	Nick Saban	A&H, **AP**, B(QPRS), BCS, BR, CCR, CFRA, CM, DuS, **FWAA**, MCFR, **NFF**, SR, **USAT**, W
2010	**Auburn**	14–0	Gene Chizik	A&H, **AP**, B(QPRS), BCS, BR, CFRA, CM, DuS, **FWAA**, MCFR, **NFF**, SR, **USAT**, W
2010	TCU	13–0	Gary Patterson	CCR
2011	**Alabama**	12–1	Nick Saban	**AP**, B(QPRS), BCS, BR, CFRA, DuS, **FWAA**, MCFR, **NFF**, SR, **USAT**, W
2011	LSU	13–1	Les Miles	A&H,^{k} CCR^{i}
2011	Oklahoma State	12–1	Mike Gundy	CM
2012	**Alabama**	13–1	Nick Saban	A&H, **AP**, BCS, BR, CCR, CFRA, DuS, **FWAA**, MCFR, **NFF**, SR, **USAT**, W
2012	Notre Dame	12–1	Brian Kelly	CM
2013	**Florida State**	14–0	Jimbo Fisher	A&H, **AP**, BCS, BR, CCR, CFRA, CM, DuS, **FWAA**, MCFR, **NFF**, SR, **USAT**, W
2014	**Ohio State**	14–1	Urban Meyer	A&H, **AP**, BR, CCR, CFP, CFRA, CM, DuS, MCFR, **NFF**, SR, **USAT**, W
2015	**Alabama**	14–1	Nick Saban	A&H, **AP**, BR, CCR, CFP, CFRA, CM, DuS, MCFR, **NFF**, SR, **USAT**, W
2016	Alabama	14–1	Nick Saban	CM
2016	**Clemson**	14–1	Dabo Swinney	A&H, **AP**, BR, CCR, CFP, CFRA, DuS, MCFR, **NFF**, SR, **USAT**, W
2017	**Alabama**	13–1	Nick Saban	A&H, **AP**, BR, CCR, CFP, CFRA, DuS, MCFR, **NFF**, SR, **USAT**, W
2017	UCF	13–0	Scott Frost	CM
2018	**Clemson**	15–0	Dabo Swinney	A&H, **AP**, BR, CCR, CFP, CFRA, CM, DuS, MCFR, **NFF**, SR, **USAT**, W
2019	**LSU**	15–0	Ed Orgeron	A&H, **AP**, BR, CCR, CFP, CFRA, CM, DuS, MCFR, **NFF**, SR, **USAT**, W
2020	**Alabama**	13–0	Nick Saban	A&H, **AP**, CCR, CFP, CFRA, CM, MCFR, **NFF**, SR, **USAT**
2021	**Georgia**	14–1	Kirby Smart	A&H, **AP**, CCR, CFP, CFRA, CM, MCFR, **NFF**, SR, **USAT**, W
2022	**Georgia**	15–0	Kirby Smart	A&H, **AP**, CCR, CFP, CFRA, CM, MCFR, **NFF**, SR, **USAT**, W
2023	**Michigan**	15–0	Jim Harbaugh	A&H, **AP**, CCR, CFP, CFRA, CM, MCFR, **NFF**, SR, **USAT**, W
2024	**Ohio State**	14–2	Ryan Day	**AP**, CCR, CFP, CFRA, CM, **NFF**, SR, **USAT**
2024	Oregon	13–1	Dan Lanning	A&H, W
2025	**Indiana**	16–0	Curt Cignetti	A&H, **AP**, CCR, CFP, CFRA, CM, MCFR, **NFF**, SR, **USAT**, W

^{a}Parke H. Davis' selection for 1901, as published in the 1934 edition of Spalding's Foot Ball Guide, was Harvard. The NCAA Records Book states "Yale" for 1901, which is an error that has been perpetuated since the first appearance of Parke H. Davis' selections in the 1994 NCAA records book.
^{b}The FWAA stripped USC of its 2004 Grantland Rice Trophy and vacated the selection of its national champion for 2004. The BCS also vacated USC's participation in the 2005 Orange Bowl and USC's 2004 BCS National Championship, and the AFCA Coaches Poll Coaches' Trophy was returned.
^{c}Record does not count wins against UCLA, or against Oklahoma in the BCS Championship game on January 4, 2005, as they were vacated by the NCAA.
^{d}The NCAA Football Bowl Subdivision Records book lists Dunkel as having selected LSU, while Dunkel's official website gave USC as its 2007 selection.
^{e}The NCAA Football Bowl Subdivision Records book lists CCR as having selected LSU, while CCR's official website gives USC as its 2003 selection.
^{f}The NCAA Football Bowl Subdivision Records book lists DeVold (DeS) as having selected Florida, while DeVold's official website gives Ohio State as its 2006 selection.
^{g}The NCAA Football Bowl Subdivision Records book lists R(FACT) as having selected Florida, while R(FACT)'s official website gives co-champions Ohio State and Florida as its 2006 selection.
^{h}The NCAA Football Bowl Subdivision Records book lists Wolfe as having selected Florida, while Wolfe's official website gives Utah as its 2008 selection.
^{i}The NCAA Football Bowl Subdivision Records book lists CCR as having selected Alabama, while CCR's official website gives LSU as its 2011 selection.
^{j}The NCAA Football Bowl Subdivision Records book lists Anderson & Hester (A&H) as having selected LSU, while A&H's official website gives Missouri as its 2007 selection.
^{k}The NCAA Football Bowl Subdivision Records book lists Anderson & Hester (A&H) as having selected Alabama, while A&H's official website gives LSU as its 2011 selection.
^{l}The NCAA Football Bowl Subdivision Records book lists the Williamson System as having selected TCU and LSU as co-champions for 1935. However, the system's post-bowl final rankings published in January 1936 show TCU first, SMU second, and LSU third. The accompanying column written by Paul B. Williamson states "There was no undisputable national champion in 1935".
^{m}The NCAA Football Bowl Subdivision Records book lists the Williamson System as having selected LSU in 1936. However, the system's post-bowl final rankings show Minnesota first and LSU fourth.
^{n}The NCAA Football Bowl Subdivision Records book lists the Williamson System as having selected Pittsburgh in 1937. However, the system's post-bowl final rankings show California first and Pittsburgh second.
^{o}The NCAA Football Bowl Subdivision Records book lists the Williamson System as having selected TCU alone in 1938. However, the system's post-bowl final rankings show a tie between TCU and Tennessee.
^{p}The NCAA Football Bowl Subdivision Records book lists the Williamson System as having selected Tennessee in 1940. However, the system's post-bowl final rankings show Stanford first and Tennessee sixth.
^{q}The NCAA Football Bowl Subdivision Records book lists the Billingsley Report as having selected Army in 1944 and Ohio State and Army in 1945. According to Billingsley's official website, these selection years are reversed.
^{r}Kansas' 1960 defeat of Missouri was overturned by the Big Eight Conference on December 8 (ineligible player). The reversal erased the only loss on Missouri's record.

=== Total championship selections from major selectors by school ===
The national title count listed below is a culmination of all championship awarded since 1869, regardless of "consensus" or non-consensus status, as listed in the table above according to the selectors deemed to be "major" as listed in the official NCAA Football Bowl Subdivision Records.

The totals can be said to be disputed. Individual schools may claim national championships not accounted for by the NCAA Football Bowl Subdivision Records or may not claim national championship selections that do appear in the official NCAA Football Bowl Subdivision Records (see National championship claims by school below).

Championships	Schools
28	Princeton
27	Yale
24	Alabama
22	Notre Dame
19	Michigan
17	Oklahoma, USC
16	Ohio State
12	Harvard, Nebraska
11	Pittsburgh
9	Florida State, Miami (FL), Minnesota, Texas
8	Georgia, LSU
7	Georgia Tech, Penn, Penn State, Tennessee
6	Auburn, Michigan State
5	Army, California, Cornell, Florida, Illinois, Iowa
4	Vanderbilt, Washington
3	Clemson, Lafayette, Ole Miss, SMU, TCU, Texas A&M
2	Arizona State, Arkansas, Chicago, Maryland, Missouri, Oklahoma State, Stanford, Wisconsin
1	BYU, Centre, Colgate, Colorado, Columbia, Dartmouth, Detroit, Duke, Indiana, Kentucky, Navy, Oregon, Purdue, Rutgers, Syracuse, UCF, UCLA, Utah, Washington & Jefferson

== Major polls ==
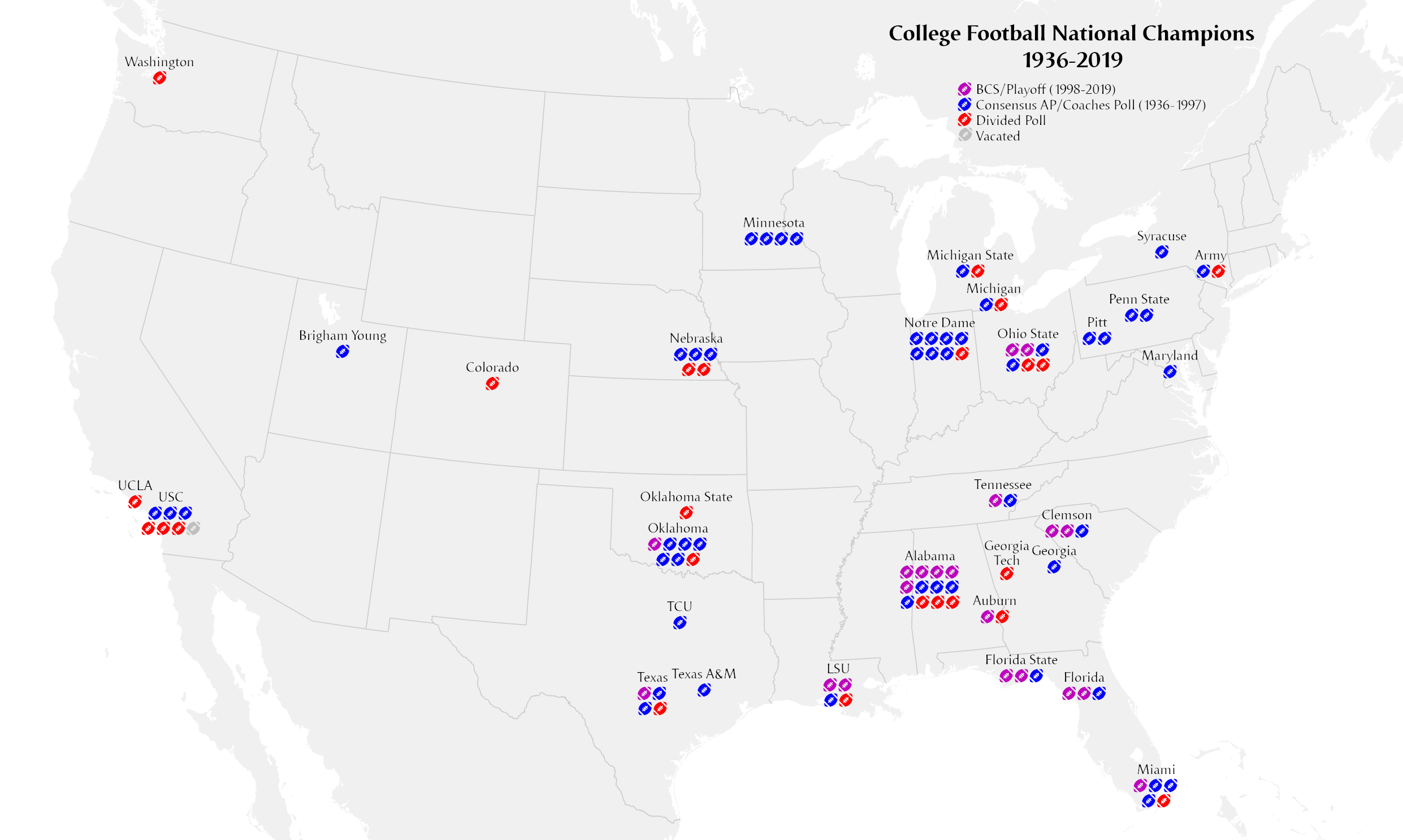
Map of U.S. college football champions, 1936–2019

National championship selectors came to be dominated by two competing news agencies in the later half of the 20th century: the Associated Press (AP) and United Press International (UPI).

These wire services began ranking college football teams in weekly polls, which were then promptly published in the sports sections of each agency's subscribing newspapers across the country. The team ranking No. 1 in each agency's final poll of the season was awarded that agency's national championship.

National championships are often stated to be "consensus" when the two major polls are in agreement with their selections.

=== AP Poll ===
The Associated Press (AP) college football poll has a long history. The news media began running their own polls of sports writers to determine who was, by popular opinion, the best football team in the country at the end of the season. One of the earliest such polls was the AP College Football Poll, first run in 1934 (compiled and organized by Charles Woodroof, former SEC Assistant Director of Media Relations, but not recognized in the official NCAA Football Bowl Subdivision Records) and then continuously from 1936. The first major nationwide poll for ranking college football teams, the Associated Press is probably the most well-known and widely circulated among all of history's polls. Due to the long-standing historical ties between individual college football conferences and high-paying bowl games like the Rose Bowl and Orange Bowl, the NCAA has never held a tournament or championship game to determine the champion of what is now the highest division, NCAA Division I, Football Bowl Subdivision (the Division I, Football Championship Subdivision and lower divisions do hold championship tournaments). As a result, the public and the media began to take the leading vote-getter in the final AP Poll as the national champion for that season.

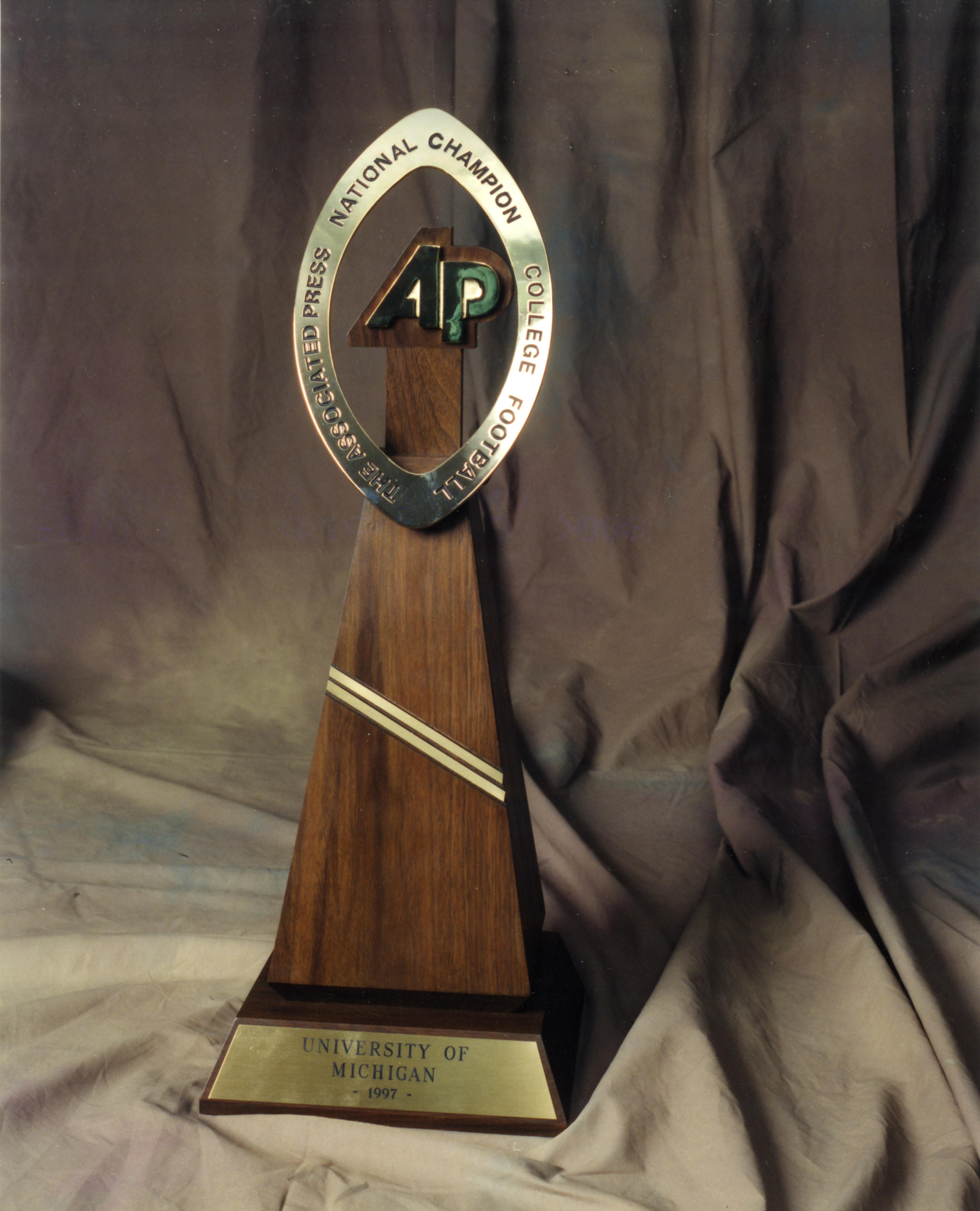
AP National Championship Trophy c. 1997

In the AP Poll's early years, the final poll of sportswriters was taken prior to any bowl games and sometimes even prior to the top teams' final games of the regular season. In 1938, the poll was extended for one week after Notre Dame, No. 1 in the scheduled "final" poll, subsequently lost to rival USC.

Following the 1947 season the AP held a special post-bowl poll with only two teams on the ballot, Notre Dame and Michigan, but stated that the result would not supersede that of the final poll conducted following the end of the regular season. The rivals, both unbeaten and untied, had been ranked No. 1 and No. 2 respectively in the final poll. January voters were impressed by Michigan's 49–0 win over common opponent USC in the Rose Bowl and elevated the Wolverines above the Irish in the special post-bowl poll.

The AP champion would lose its bowl game five times, following the 1950, 1951, 1953, 1960, and 1964 seasons.

In 1965 the AP decided to delay the season's final poll until after New Year's Day, citing the proliferation of bowl games and the involvement of eight of the poll's current top ten teams in post-season play. In the next season, 1966, neither of the top two teams (Notre Dame and Michigan State) were attending bowl games so no post-bowl poll was taken, even after two-time defending AP national champion No. 3 Alabama won the Sugar Bowl and finished the season unbeaten and untied. In 1967 the final poll crowning USC national champion was taken before No. 2 Tennessee or No. 3 Oklahoma had even played their final games of the regular season, and well before those two teams met in the Orange Bowl.

In 1968 the final poll was again delayed until after the bowl games so that No. 1 Ohio State could meet No. 2 USC in a "dream match" in the Rose Bowl. Every subsequent season's final AP Poll would be released after the bowl games. UPI did not follow suit until the 1974 season; in the overlapping years, the Coaches Poll champion lost their bowl game in 1965, 1970, and 1973. The AP's earlier move to crown a post-bowl champion paid off, as in all three years the losing team had also been the No. 1 team in the pre-bowl penultimate AP rankings.

The AP Poll was used as a component of the Bowl Championship Series (BCS) computer ranking formula starting in 1998, but without any formal agreement in place like the contract made between the BCS and the Coaches Poll. For the 2003 season the AP Poll caused a split national title and BCS controversy when it awarded its national championship to No. 1 USC instead of BCS champion LSU. In December 2004 the AP opted out of the BCS formula, requesting that the BCS "discontinue its unauthorized use of the AP poll as a component of BCS rankings", in response to three AP voters from Texas elevating Texas above California into the Rose Bowl in the last regular season AP Poll.

In the College Football Playoff era, the Associated Press has continued to award the AP Trophy to the No. 1 team in the final AP Poll. AP rankings are not incorporated in the CFP selection committee's seeding, and voting AP sportswriters are not obligated to award their title to the winner of the CFP national championship game. In 2015 the Associated Press's global sports editor stated that "it is not out of the realm of possibility that a team could win the AP national championship without winning the College Football Playoff's national championship", although that scenario has yet to occur.

=== Coaches Poll ===
The AFCA National Championship Trophy

News agency United Press (UP), the main competitor to the Associated Press, began conducting its own college football ratings during the 1950 season. The wire service came to be known as United Press International (UPI) following a merger with International News Service in 1958.

The weekly ranking was a joint polling effort between the news agency and the American Football Coaches Association (AFCA), with UP/UPI sports writers gathering and tabulating the coaches' votes and publishing the results in newspapers across the nation.

The UP/UPI rankings were originally conducted by polling 35 of the nation's college football coaches. The coaches were chosen to represent every major football conference, with 5 coaches from each of 7 regions, in an apparent effort to combat the perceived East Coast bias of the rival AP Poll's constituent sports writers.

Their votes will provide the only football rating based on the opinion of the men who know the sport best. The nature of the board, giving each section of the country equal representation, avoids the sectional bias and ballot box stuffing for which other football polls have been criticized.

— United Press Football Ratings announcement, September 1950

Each season's final Coaches Poll was initially published following the regular season and did not take bowl game results into account; the UP/UPI national champion lost its bowl game 8 times between 1950 and 1973. Since the 1974 season the poll has awarded its national championship following the postseason bowls. That same year the AFCA voted to thereafter not rank any team currently under NCAA or conference-sanctioned probation.

Following the decline of UPI in the 1980s, the AFCA ended their 42-year relationship with the wire service in 1991. The Coaches Poll continued, with new sponsorship and distribution partners, as the USA Today/CNN poll (1991–1996), USA Today/ESPN poll (1997–2004) and USA Today poll (2005–present).

The Bowl Championship Series included the Coaches Poll as a major factor in its ranking formula. In return, voting AFCA members were contractually obligated to award their Coaches Poll national championship selections to the winner of the BCS National Championship Game. Lacking its own dedicated trophy, the BCS champion was awarded The Coaches' Trophy on the field immediately following the game.

=== Poll era national championships by school (1936–present) ===
The following table contains the national championships that have been recognized by the final AP or Coaches Poll. Originally both the AP and Coaches poll champions were crowned after the regular season, but since 1968 and 1974 respectively, both polls crown their champions after the bowl games are completed (with the exception of the 1965 season). The BCS champion was automatically awarded the Coaches Poll championship. Of the current 120+ Football Bowl Subdivision (FBS, formerly Division I-A) schools, only 31 have won at least a share of a national title by the AP or Coaches poll. Of these 31 teams, only 21 teams have won multiple titles. Of the 21 teams, only seven have won five or more national titles: Alabama, Notre Dame, Oklahoma, USC, Miami (FL), Nebraska, and Ohio State. The years listed in the table below indicate a national championship selection by the AP or Coaches Poll. The selections are noted with (AP) or (Coaches) when a national champion selection differed between the two polls for that particular season, which has occurred in twelve different seasons (including 2004, for which the coaches selection was rescinded) since the polls first came to coexist in 1950.

School	Titles	Winning years
Alabama	13	1961, 1964, 1965 (AP), 1973 (Coaches), 1978 (AP), 1979, 1992, 2009, 2011, 2012, 2015, 2017, 2020
Notre Dame	8	1943, 1946, 1947, 1949, 1966, 1973 (AP), 1977, 1988
Ohio State	7	1942, 1954 (AP), 1957 (Coaches), 1968, 2002, 2014, 2024
Oklahoma	7	1950, 1955, 1956, 1974 (AP), 1975, 1985, 2000
USC	7	1962, 1967, 1972, 1974 (Coaches), 1978 (Coaches), 2003 (AP), 2004 (AP)†
Miami (FL)	5	1983, 1987, 1989, 1991 (AP), 2001
Nebraska	5	1970 (AP), 1971, 1994, 1995, 1997 (Coaches)
LSU	4	1958, 2003 (Coaches), 2007, 2019
Texas	4	1963, 1969, 1970 (Coaches), 2005
Minnesota	4	1936, 1940, 1941, 1960
Clemson	3	1981, 2016, 2018
Florida	3	1996, 2006, 2008
Florida State	3	1993, 1999, 2013
Georgia	3	1980, 2021, 2022
Michigan	3	1948, 1997 (AP), 2023
Army	2	1944, 1945
Auburn	2	1957 (AP), 2010
Michigan State	2	1952, 1965 (Coaches)
Penn State	2	1982, 1986
Pittsburgh	2	1937, 1976
Tennessee	2	1951, 1998
TCU	1	1938
BYU	1	1984
Colorado	1	1990 (AP)
Georgia Tech	1	1990 (Coaches)
Indiana	1	2025
Maryland	1	1953
Syracuse	1	1959
Texas A&M	1	1939
UCLA	1	1954 (Coaches)
Washington	1	1991 (Coaches)

† USC's 2004 BCS National Championship was vacated by the BCS and their AFCA Coaches' Trophy was returned.

=== Split national championships ===
The AP Poll and Coaches Poll have picked different final national poll leaders at the end of 11 different seasons since their first concurrent polls in 1950. This situation is referred to as a "split" national championship.

Season	Champion	Record	Wire service poll
1954	Ohio State	10–0	AP
1954	UCLA	9–0	Coaches
1957	Auburn	10–0	AP
1957	Ohio State	9–1	Coaches
1965	Alabama	9–1–1	AP
1965	Michigan State	10–1	Coaches
1970	Nebraska	11–0–1	AP
1970	Texas	10–1	Coaches
1973	Notre Dame	11–0	AP
1973	Alabama	11–1	Coaches
1974	Oklahoma	11–0	AP
1974	USC	10–1–1	Coaches
1978	Alabama	11–1	AP
1978	USC	12–1	Coaches
1990	Colorado	11–1–1	AP
1990	Georgia Tech	11–0–1	Coaches
1991	Miami (FL)	12–0	AP
1991	Washington	12–0	Coaches
1997	Michigan	12–0	AP
1997	Nebraska	13–0	Coaches
2003	USC	12–1	AP
2003	LSU	13–1	Coaches

== National championship games ==
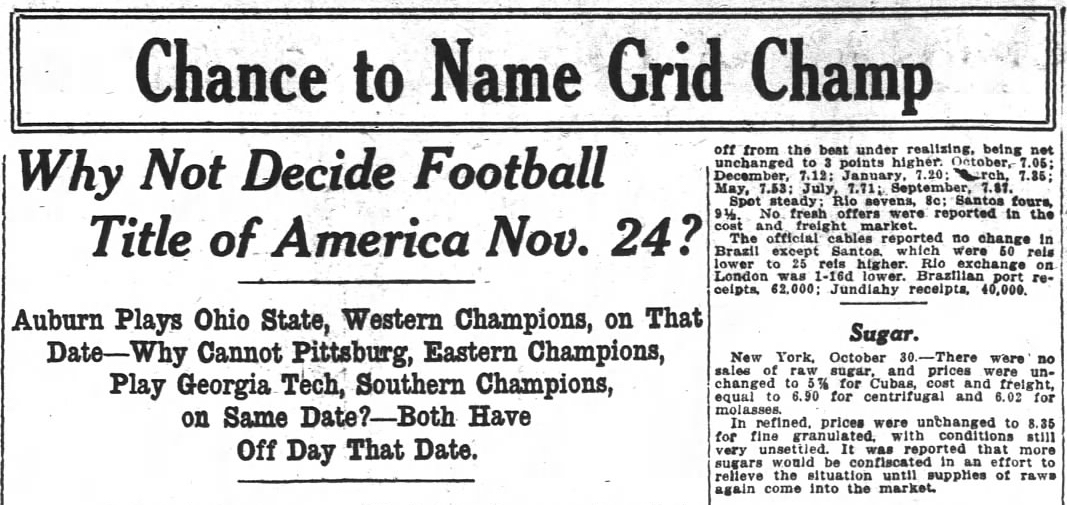
Column in The Atlanta Constitution proposing a 1917 national championship game between Georgia Tech and Pittsburgh

College football fans and administrators have long sought to match the No. 1 vs. No. 2 teams in an end-of-season national championship game to determine an undisputed national champion on the gridiron.

=== Historic occurrences ===
Throughout most of the 20th century, a number of challenges made it frequently impossible to schedule the two top teams for a single post-season contest.

- Some schools, most notably Notre Dame, declined to play in bowl games for many years.
- Conference tie-ins prevented certain conference champions from ever meeting in a post-season bowl game.
- "No repeat" rules prevented teams from playing in their conference's bowl two seasons in a row.
- At-large bowl game invitations were extended in mid-November, locking in teams with subsequent late-season losses.

Through luck and fortuitous scheduling, a "national championship game" was occasionally able to settle the matter on the field, as described in some contemporaneous reports. Despite the promotional billing, in several instances there were plausible scenarios for a third team to be selected as national champion by the major selectors, depending on outcomes of other games.

Season	Game	Winning team	Score	Losing team	Notes
1924	Rose Bowl	Notre Dame	27–10	Stanford	
1931	Rose Bowl	No. 2 USC	21–12	No. 1 Tulane	Title game for the Albert Russel Erskine Trophy and for the Dickinson System's Knute Rockne Memorial Trophy.
1932	Rose Bowl	No. 2 USC	35–0	No. 3 Pittsburgh	When the Dickinson rankings crowned Michigan as national champion, a "peeved" Jack Rissman, a merchant of Chicago, created a new national championship trophy and announced that it would be awarded to the victor of the Rose Bowl matchup between No. 2 USC and No. 3 Pittsburgh (as ranked by Dickinson).
1943	Notre Dame vs. Iowa Pre-Flight	No. 1 Notre Dame	14–13	No. 2 Iowa Pre-Flight	Game played November 20. Each played another regular season game November 27, which for Notre Dame was a loss to Great Lakes Navy.
1944	Army–Navy Game	No. 1 Army	23–7	No. 2 Navy	Final regular season game. Navy finished 6–3 ranked No. 4.
1945	Game of the Century	No. 1 Army	32–13	No. 2 Navy	
1946	Game of the Century	No. 1 Army	0–0	No. 2 Notre Dame	Game played November 9. Both teams won all of their remaining games. The teams switched rankings in the final AP Poll.
1962	Rose Bowl	No. 1 USC	42–37	No. 2 Wisconsin	FWAA only; USC had already been named No. 1 in the final AP and Coaches Polls four weeks earlier.
1963	Cotton Bowl	No. 1 Texas	28–6	No. 2 Navy	FWAA only; Texas had already been named No. 1 in the final AP and Coaches Polls three weeks earlier.
1965	Orange Bowl	No. 4 Alabama	39–28	No. 3 Nebraska	Became AP Poll championship game after No. 1 and 2 teams lost the Rose and Cotton Bowl games earlier in the day.
1966	Game of the Century	No. 1 Notre Dame	10–10	No. 2 Michigan State	The following week Notre Dame defeated USC in its last regular season game.
1967	Game of the Century	No. 4 USC	21–20	No. 1 UCLA	Game was played November 18. UCLA played and lost another regular season game November 25 and dropped out of the top ten. Tennessee was ranked No. 2 entering play that week, won its last two regular season games, and remained No. 2 in the final championship polls in late November.
1968	Rose Bowl	No. 1 Ohio State	27–16	No. 2 USC	Final AP poll was delayed until after the bowl games specifically to account for the result of the No. 1 vs. No. 2 "dream match" in the Rose Bowl.
1969	Game of the Century	No. 1 Texas	15–14	No. 2 (AP) Arkansas	Winner was to be awarded a presidential plaque by game attendee Richard Nixon declaring them "the number-one college football team in college football's one-hundredth year." This was the final regular season game, and it determined the Coaches Poll title. Entering the game, Arkansas ranked No. 3 in the Coaches Poll and remained No. 3.
1971	Game of the Century	No. 1 Nebraska	35–31	No. 2 Oklahoma	Game played November 25 for Coaches Poll title, compiled before bowl games and released December 6. Each played another regular season game December 4.
1971	Orange Bowl	No. 1 Nebraska	38–6	No. 2 Alabama	Title game for AP Trophy and NFF MacArthur Bowl.
1972	Rose Bowl	No. 1 USC	42–17	No. 3 Ohio State	One-loss Oklahoma, No. 2 in final regular season polls, won the Sugar Bowl and remained No. 2 after the bowls.
1973	Sugar Bowl	No. 3 Notre Dame	24–23	No. 1 Alabama	Title game for NFF MacArthur Bowl; No. 2 Oklahoma finished 10–0–1, was on probation and ineligible for a bowl game but still eligible for the AP Trophy.
1978	Sugar Bowl	No. 2 Alabama	14–7	No. 1 Penn State	National championship was split; No. 3 USC finished atop Coaches Poll.
1982	Sugar Bowl	No. 2 Penn State	27–23	No. 1 Georgia	
1983	Orange Bowl	No. 5 Miami (FL)	31–30	No. 1 Nebraska	No. 2 Texas and No. 4 Illinois had lost earlier in the day. No. 3 Auburn won the Sugar Bowl played at the same time.
1984	Orange Bowl	No. 4 Washington	28–17	No. 2 Oklahoma	BYU won national titles in both AP and Coaches Polls.
1985	Orange Bowl	No. 3 (AP) Oklahoma	25–10	No. 1 Penn State	Oklahoma entered the game No. 2 in the Coaches Poll and No. 3 in the AP Poll. AP No. 2 Miami lost in the Sugar Bowl played at the same time.
1986	Fiesta Bowl	No. 2 Penn State	14–10	No. 1 Miami (FL)	
1987	Orange Bowl	No. 2 Miami (FL)	20–14	No. 1 Oklahoma	
1988	Fiesta Bowl	No. 1 Notre Dame	34–21	No. 3 West Virginia	Winner would be the season's only undefeated team; one-loss No. 2 Miami held out slim hope to be voted No. 1 in the case of a West Virginia win.

=== Bowl Coalition (1992–1994) ===
Following back-to-back years of split AP and Coaches Poll national champions in 1990, between Colorado (AP) and Georgia Tech (Coaches), and 1991, between Miami (FL) (AP) and Washington (Coaches), the Bowl Coalition was formed in 1992 to increase the probability of a No. 1 vs. No. 2 national championship game matchup in one of the Coalition's participating bowls.

The Coalition's rules retained traditional bowl game conference tie-ins but provided some flexibility for scheduling a No. 1 vs. No. 2 matchup between two teams selected from among the champions of the ACC, Big East, Big Eight, SEC, and SWC conferences, or independent Notre Dame, in the Cotton Bowl, Fiesta Bowl, Orange Bowl, or Sugar Bowl.

The Big Ten and Pac-10 conferences were notably not members of the Bowl Coalition, with their champions retaining their traditional and contractual matchup in the Rose Bowl. Likewise, mid-major teams had no route to the Bowl Coalition National Championship Game.

Season	Bowl	Winning team	Score	Losing team	Notes
1992	Sugar Bowl	No. 2 Alabama	34–13	No. 1 Miami (FL)	
1993	Orange Bowl	No. 1 Florida State	18–16	No. 2 Nebraska	
1994	Orange Bowl	No. 1 Nebraska	24–17	No. 3 Miami (FL)	

=== Bowl Alliance (1995–1997) ===
In 1995 the Bowl Alliance replaced the Bowl Coalition. Going further than the Coalition, the Alliance guaranteed a postseason matchup of the top two teams within its same five conference champions plus Notre Dame. Beginning in 1996, the Big 12 champion joined the Alliance in place of the champions of the disbanded Big Eight and Southwest conferences.

Unlike the Coalition, the Alliance eliminated traditional conference tie-ins to its associated bowls. The Bowl Alliance national championship game would be rotated amongst the Fiesta Bowl, Sugar Bowl, and Orange Bowl, with the Cotton Bowl dropped from the slate. The Bowl Alliance also awarded its own trophy to the winner of its national championship game.

The Rose Bowl remained independent of the Alliance, leaving open the possibility of a national title going to the Big Ten or Pac-10 Rose Bowl champion rather than one of the two top teams in the Alliance. This occurred in 1997, when No. 1 Michigan won the Rose Bowl and retained their top ranking in the AP Poll. Lacking the nation's No. 1 team, the Orange Bowl was branded as the "Alliance National Championship". Winner Nebraska split the polls when they passed AP champion Michigan in the final Coaches Poll (a result denied by the Coaches Poll to Penn State three years earlier in the same situation).

Season	Bowl	Winning team	Score	Losing team	Notes
1995	Fiesta Bowl	No. 1 Nebraska	62–24	No. 2 Florida	
1996	Sugar Bowl	No. 3 Florida	52–20	No. 1 Florida State	
1997	Orange Bowl	No. 2 Nebraska	42–17	No. 3 Tennessee	

=== Bowl Championship Series (1998–2013) ===
The Bowl Championship Series (BCS), starting in 1998, finally succeeded in bringing the Big Ten and Pac-10 conferences together with the former Coalition and Alliance members for a combined national championship game.

Following the regular season, the BCS paired its No. 1 and No. 2 ranked teams to play for the title in the BCS National Championship Game. This designation initially rotated in order between four BCS Bowls: the Fiesta Bowl, Sugar Bowl, Orange Bowl, and Rose Bowl. For the 2006 season onward the BCS National Championship Game became its own separate contest, played one week later at the site of the bowl in the same rotation.

The original BCS formula incorporated the AP Poll and Coaches Poll along with an average of various computer rankings. The formula underwent many adjustments over the years, including a large overhaul following the 2004 season in which the AP Poll was replaced with the Harris Interactive College Football Poll.

The winners of the BCS National Championship Game were crowned the Coaches Poll national champions and were awarded the Coaches' Trophy on the field following the game. They were also awarded the MacArthur Bowl by the National Football Foundation.

==== BCS National Championships by school ====
School	Titles	Winning years
Alabama	3	2009, 2011, 2012
Florida State	2	1999, 2013
Florida	2	2006, 2008
LSU	2	2003, 2007
Oklahoma	1	2000
Ohio State	1	2002
Auburn	1	2010
Miami (FL)	1	2001
Texas	1	2005
Tennessee	1	1998
USC	0^{1}	2004

Notes

^{1} USC's victory in the 2005 Orange Bowl and corresponding 2004–05 BCS National Championship was vacated by the BCS.

=== College Football Playoff (2014–present) ===
National Championship Celebration at Georgia's Sanford Stadium in January 2022

The College Football Playoff (CFP) was designed as a replacement for the BCS. While the NCAA still does not officially sanction the event, organizers sought to bring a playoff system similar to all other levels of NCAA football to the Football Bowl Subdivision.

The College Football Playoff relies on a 13-member selection committee to select twelve teams to play in a four-round single-elimination playoff bracket, with automatic bids to the playoff given to the five highest ranked conference champions and the four highest of those teams each receiving a first round bye. The winner of the final game is awarded the College Football Playoff National Championship Trophy.

==== CFP National Championships by school ====
School	Titles	Winning seasons
Alabama	3	2015, 2017, 2020
Clemson	2	2016, 2018
Georgia	2	2021, 2022
Ohio State	2	2014, 2024
Indiana	1	2025
LSU	1	2019
Michigan	1	2023

== National championship claims ==
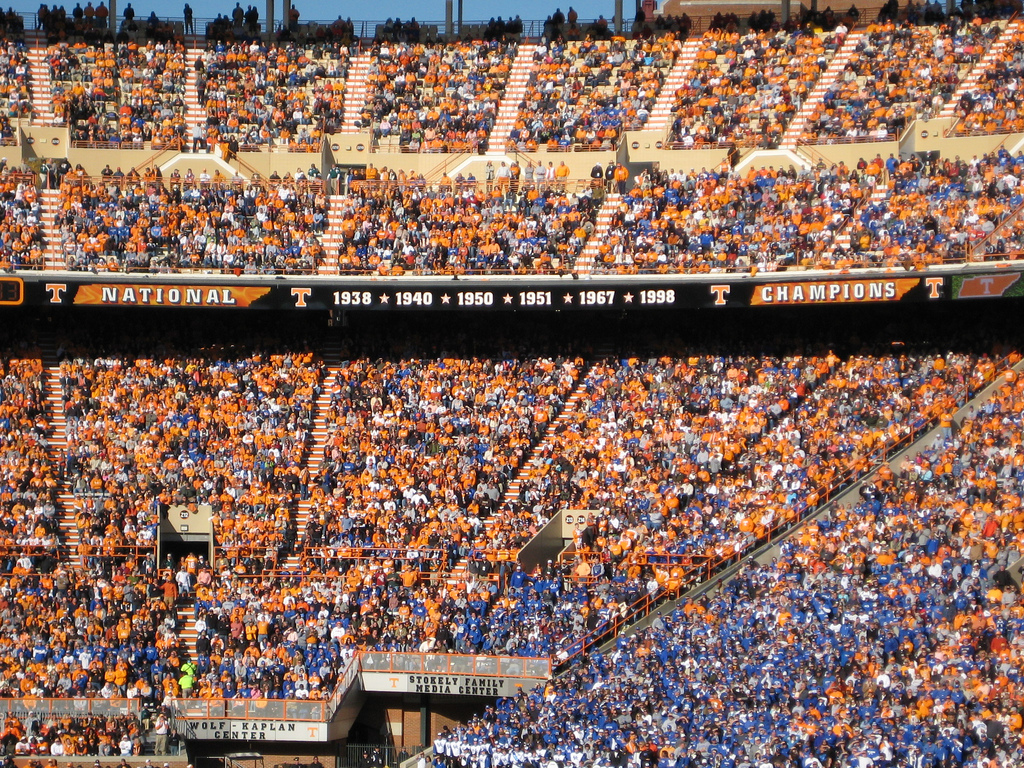
Tennessee's national championship claims, as posted in their Neyland Stadium

The following tables list schools' known national championship claims at the highest level of play in college football. Some of these schools no longer compete at the highest level, which is currently NCAA Division I FBS, but nonetheless maintain claims to titles from when they did compete at the highest level.

Because there is no one governing or official body that regulates, recognizes, or awards national championships in college football, and because many independent selectors of championships exist, many of the claims by the schools listed below are shared, contradict each other, or are controversial.

"There is no official standard because there is no official national champion. It all depends on the standard the school wishes to utilize. The national champion is in the eye of the beholder."

— Kent Stephens, historian, College Football Hall of Fame

The majority of these claims, but not all, are based on championships awarded from selectors listed as "major" in the official NCAA Football Bowl Subdivision Records publication. Not all championships awarded by third party selectors, nor all those listed in the NCAA records book, are necessarily claimed by each school. (Note: The following schools either make no apparent statement or claim regarding national championships, or clearly state no claims on a national championship, despite the listing of a national championship for that school in the official NCAA Football Bowl Subdivision Records: Arizona State, Colgate, Duke, Oregon, Purdue, Utah, Vanderbilt, and Washington & Jefferson.) Therefore, these claims represent how each individual school sees their own history on the subject of national championships.

The tables below include only national championship claims originating from each particular school and therefore represent the point-of-view of each individual institution. Each total number of championships, and the years for which they are claimed, are documented by the particular school on its official website, in its football media guide, on a prominent stadium sign, or in other official publications or literature (see Source). If a championship is not mentioned by a school for any particular season, regardless of whether it was awarded by a selector or listed in a third-party publication such as the official NCAA Football Bowl Subdivision Records, it is not considered to be claimed by that institution.

=== Claims by school ===
School	Claims	Claimed national championship seasons	Source
Princeton	28	1869, 1870, 1872, 1873, 1874, 1875, 1877, 1878, 1879, 1880, 1881, 1884, 1885, 1886, 1889, 1893, 1894, 1896, 1898, 1899, 1903, 1906, 1911, 1920, 1922, 1933, 1935, 1950	
Yale	27	1872, 1874, 1876, 1877, 1879, 1880, 1881, 1882, 1883, 1884, 1886, 1887, 1888, 1891, 1892, 1893, 1894, 1895, 1897, 1900, 1901, (Note: No major selectors chose Yale for 1901. The original source for Parke H. Davis' "National Champion Foot Ball Teams" states "1901 Harvard".) 1902, 1905, 1906, 1907, 1909, 1927	
Alabama	18	1925, 1926, 1930, 1934, 1941, 1961, 1964, 1965, 1973, 1978, 1979, 1992, 2009, 2011, 2012, 2015, 2017, 2020	
Michigan	12	1901, 1902, 1903, 1904, 1918, 1923, 1932, 1933, 1947, 1948, 1997, 2023	
Notre Dame	11	1924, 1929, 1930, 1943, 1946, 1947, 1949, 1966, 1973, 1977, 1988	
USC	11	1928, 1931, 1932, 1939, 1962, 1967, 1972, 1974, 1978, 2003, 2004 (Note: USC's January 4, 2005, win over Oklahoma in the BCS Championship Game was vacated as mandated by the NCAA, its 2004 BCS national championship vacated by the BCS, and its AFCA Coaches' Trophy returned. NCAA sanctions mandate that "any reference to the vacated results, including championships, shall be removed." USC still retains the 2004 Associated Press national championship trophy and has not abandoned its claim to the 2004 national championship.)	
Auburn	9	1910, 1913, 1914, 1957, 1958, 1983, 1993, 2004, 2010 (Note: No major selectors chose Auburn for 1914, 1958, and 2004.)	
Ohio State	9	1942, 1954, 1957, 1961, 1968, 1970, 2002, 2014, 2024	
Pittsburgh	9	1915, 1916, 1918, 1929, 1931, 1934, (Note: No major selectors chose Pittsburgh for 1934. Parke H. Davis died in June 1934; Pitt was selected in the next 1935 edition of the Spalding Foot Ball Guide but that selection is not included in the NCAA record books. Pitt's claim was based on a 1967 Sports Illustrated article which attributed the posthumous Spalding selections directly to Davis.) 1936, 1937, 1976	
Harvard	7	1890, 1898, 1899, 1910, 1912, 1913, 1919	
Minnesota	7	1904, 1934, 1935, 1936, 1940, 1941, 1960	
Oklahoma	7	1950, 1955, 1956, 1974, 1975, 1985, 2000	
Penn	7	1894, 1895, 1897, 1904, 1907, (Note: The Billingsley Report originally named Penn as champions for 1907 and the team was listed in the 1996–2003 NCAA records books. However, the team was dropped from subsequent NCAA records books when Billingsley updated his system's formula to remove the Margin of Victory component.) 1908, 1924	
Michigan State	6	1951, 1952, 1955, 1957, 1965, 1966	
Tennessee	6	1938, 1940, 1950, 1951, 1967, 1998	
Army	5	1914, 1916, 1944, 1945, 1946	
California	5	1920, 1921, 1922, 1923, 1937	
Cornell	5	1915, 1921, 1922, 1923, 1939	
Illinois	5	1914, 1919, 1923, 1927, 1951	
Iowa	5	1921, 1922, 1956, 1958, 1960	
Miami (FL)	5	1983, 1987, 1989, 1991, 2001	
Nebraska	5	1970, 1971, 1994, 1995, 1997	
Georgia	4	1942, 1980, 2021, 2022	
Georgia Tech	4	1917, 1928, 1952, 1990	
LSU	4	1958, 2003, 2007, 2019	
Texas	4	1963, 1969, 1970, 2005	
Clemson	3	1981, 2016, 2018	
Florida	3	1996, 2006, 2008	
Florida State	3	1993, 1999, 2013	
Lafayette	3	1896, 1921, 1926	
Ole Miss	3	1959, 1960, 1962	
SMU	3	1935, 1981, 1982	
Texas A&M	3	1919, 1927, 1939	
Chicago	2	1905, 1913	
Columbia	2	1875, 1933 (Note: No major selectors chose Columbia, who defeated Stanford in the Rose Bowl, for 1933. Columbia's media guide states that the team "was referred to as a national champ.")	
Penn State	2	1982, 1986	
Stanford	2	1926, 1940	
TCU	2	1935, 1938	
Washington	2	1960, 1991	
Arkansas	1	1964	
Boston College	1	1940 (Note: No major selectors chose Boston College for 1940. Final AP Poll and several other selections preceded bowl games. Boston College defeated Tennessee in the Sugar Bowl in a battle of unbeatens.)	
BYU	1	1984	
Centre	1	1919	
Colorado	1	1990	
Dartmouth	1	1925	
Detroit	1	1928	
Indiana	1	2025	
Kentucky	1	1950	
Maryland	1	1953	
Missouri	1	1960	
Navy	1	1926	
Oklahoma State	1	1945	
Rutgers	1	1869	
Syracuse	1	1959	
UCF	1	2017	
UCLA	1	1954	

=== Claims by year ===
Season	Claims	Claimants	Record
1869	2	Princeton	1–1
1869	2	Rutgers	1–1
1870	1	Princeton	1–0
1871	0	None	
1872	2	Princeton	1–0
1872	2	Yale	1–0
1873	1	Princeton	2–0
1874	2	Princeton	2–0
1874	2	Yale	3–0
1875	2	Columbia	4–1–1
1875	2	Princeton	2–0
1876	1	Yale	3–0
1877	2	Princeton	2–0–1
1877	2	Yale	3–0–1
1878	1	Princeton	6–0
1879	2	Princeton	4–0–1
1879	2	Yale	3–0–2
1880	2	Princeton	4–0–1
1880	2	Yale	4–0–1
1881	2	Princeton	7–0–2
1881	2	Yale	5–0–1
1882	1	Yale	8–0
1883	1	Yale	9–0
1884	2	Princeton	9–0–1
1884	2	Yale	8–0–1
1885	1	Princeton	9–0
1886	2	Princeton	7–0–1
1886	2	Yale	9–0–1
1887	1	Yale	9–0
1888	1	Yale	13–0
1889	1	Princeton	10–0
1890	1	Harvard	11–0
1891	1	Yale	13–0
1892	1	Yale	13–0
1893	2	Princeton	11–0
1893	2	Yale	10–1
1894	3	Penn	12–0
1894	3	Princeton	8–2
1894	3	Yale	16–0
1895	2	Penn	14–0
1895	2	Yale	13–0–2
1896	2	Lafayette	11–0–1
1896	2	Princeton	10–0–1
1897	2	Penn	15–0
1897	2	Yale	9–0–2
1898	2	Harvard	11–0
1898	2	Princeton	11–0–1
1899	2	Harvard	10–0–1
1899	2	Princeton	12–1
1900	1	Yale	12–0
1901	2	Michigan	11–0
1901	2	Yale	11–1–1
1902	2	Michigan	11–0
1902	2	Yale	11–0–1
1903	2	Michigan	11–0–1
1903	2	Princeton	11–0
1904	3	Michigan	10–0
1904	3	Minnesota	13–0
1904	3	Penn	12–0
1905	2	Chicago	10–0
1905	2	Yale	10–0
1906	2	Princeton	9–0–1
1906	2	Yale	9–0–1
1907	2	Penn	11–1
1907	2	Yale	9–0–1
1908	1	Penn	11–0–1
1909	1	Yale	10–0
1910	2	Harvard	8–0–1
1910	2	Auburn	6–1
1911	1	Princeton	8–0–2
1912	1	Harvard	9–0
1913	3	Chicago	7–0
1913	3	Harvard	9–0
1913	3	Auburn	8–0
1914	3	Army	9–0
1914	3	Illinois	7–0
1914	3	Auburn	8–0–1
1915	2	Cornell	9–0
1915	2	Pittsburgh	8–0
1916	2	Army	9–0
1916	2	Pittsburgh	8–0
1917	1	Georgia Tech	9–0
1918	2	Michigan	5–0
1918	2	Pittsburgh	4–1
1919	4	Centre	9–0
1919	4	Harvard	9–0–1
1919	4	Illinois	6–1
1919	4	Texas A&M	10–0
1920	2	California	9–0
1920	2	Princeton	6–0–1
1921	4	California	9–0–1
1921	4	Cornell	8–0
1921	4	Iowa	7–0
1921	4	Lafayette	9–0
1922	4	California	9–0
1922	4	Cornell	8–0
1922	4	Iowa	7–0
1922	4	Princeton	8–0
1923	4	California	9–0–1
1923	4	Cornell	8–0
1923	4	Illinois	8–0
1923	4	Michigan	8–0
1924	2	Notre Dame	10–0
1924	2	Penn	9–1–1
1925	2	Alabama	10–0
1925	2	Dartmouth	8–0
1926	4	Alabama	9–0–1
1926	4	Lafayette	9–0
1926	4	Navy	9–0–1
1926	4	Stanford	10–0–1
1927	3	Illinois	7–0–1
1927	3	Texas A&M	8–0–1
1927	3	Yale	7–1
1928	3	Detroit	9–0
1928	3	Georgia Tech	10–0
1928	3	USC	9–0–1
1929	2	Notre Dame	9–0
1929	2	Pittsburgh	9–1
1930	2	Alabama	10–0
1930	2	Notre Dame	10–0
1931	2	Pittsburgh	8–1
1931	2	USC	10–1
1932	2	Michigan	8–0
1932	2	USC	10–0
1933	3	Columbia	8–1–1
1933	3	Michigan	7–0–1
1933	3	Princeton	9–0
1934	3	Alabama	10–0
1934	3	Pittsburgh	8–1
1934	3	Minnesota	8–0
1935	4	Minnesota	8–0
1935	4	Princeton	9–0
1935	4	SMU	12–1
1935	4	TCU	12–1
1936	2	Minnesota	7–1
1936	2	Pittsburgh	8–1–1
1937	2	California	10–0–1
1937	2	Pittsburgh	9–0–1
1938	2	TCU	11–0
1938	2	Tennessee	11–0
1939	3	Cornell	8–0
1939	3	Texas A&M	11–0
1939	3	USC	8–0–2
1940	4	Boston College	11–0
1940	4	Minnesota	8–0
1940	4	Stanford	10–0
1940	4	Tennessee	10–1
1941	2	Alabama	9–2
1941	2	Minnesota	8–0
1942	2	Georgia	11–1
1942	2	Ohio State	9–1
1943	1	Notre Dame	9–1
1944	1	Army	9–0
1945	2	Army	9–0
1945	2	Oklahoma A&M	9–0
1946	2	Army	9–0–1
1946	2	Notre Dame	8–0–1
1947	2	Michigan	10–0
1947	2	Notre Dame	9–0
1948	1	Michigan	9–0
1949	1	Notre Dame	10–0
1950	4	Kentucky	11–1
1950	4	Oklahoma	10–1
1950	4	Princeton	9–0
1950	4	Tennessee	11–1
1951	3	Illinois	9–0–1
1951	3	Michigan State	9–0
1951	3	Tennessee	10–1
1952	2	Georgia Tech	12–0
1952	2	Michigan State	9–0
1953	1	Maryland	10–1
1954	2	Ohio State	10–0
1954	2	UCLA	9–0
1955	2	Michigan State	9–1
1955	2	Oklahoma	11–0
1956	2	Iowa	9–1
1956	2	Oklahoma	10–0
1957	3	Auburn	10–0
1957	3	Michigan State	8–1
1957	3	Ohio State	9–1
1958	3	Iowa	8–1–1
1958	3	LSU	11–0
1958	3	Auburn	9–0–1
1959	2	Ole Miss	10–1
1959	2	Syracuse	11–0
1960	5	Iowa	8–1
1960	5	Minnesota	8–2
1960	5	Missouri	10–1
1960	5	Ole Miss	10–0–1
1960	5	Washington	10–1
1961	2	Alabama	11–0
1961	2	Ohio State	8–0–1
1962	2	Ole Miss	10–0
1962	2	USC	11–0
1963	1	Texas	11–0
1964	2	Alabama	10–1
1964	2	Arkansas	11–0
1965	2	Alabama	9–1–1
1965	2	Michigan State	10–1
1966	2	Michigan State	9–0–1
1966	2	Notre Dame	9–0–1
1967	2	USC	10–1
1967	2	Tennessee	9–2
1968	1	Ohio State	10–0
1969	1	Texas	11–0
1970	3	Nebraska	11–0–1
1970	3	Ohio State	9–1
1970	3	Texas	10–1
1971	1	Nebraska	13–0
1972	1	USC	12–0
1973	2	Alabama	11–1
1973	2	Notre Dame	11–0
1974	2	Oklahoma	11–0
1974	2	USC	10–1–1
1975	1	Oklahoma	11–1
1976	1	Pittsburgh	12–0
1977	1	Notre Dame	11–1
1978	2	Alabama	11–1
1978	2	USC	12–1
1979	1	Alabama	12–0
1980	1	Georgia	12–0
1981	2	Clemson	12–0
1981	2	SMU	10–1
1982	2	Penn State	11–1
1982	2	SMU	11–0–1
1983	2	Miami (FL)	11–1
1983	2	Auburn	11–1
1984	1	BYU	13–0
1985	1	Oklahoma	11–1
1986	1	Penn State	12–0
1987	1	Miami (FL)	12–0
1988	1	Notre Dame	12–0
1989	1	Miami (FL)	11–1
1990	2	Colorado	11–1–1
1990	2	Georgia Tech	11–0–1
1991	2	Miami (FL)	12–0
1991	2	Washington	12–0
1992	1	Alabama	13–0
1993	2	Florida State	12–1
1993	2	Auburn	11–0
1994	1	Nebraska	13–0
1995	1	Nebraska	12–0
1996	1	Florida	12–1
1997	2	Michigan	12–0
1997	2	Nebraska	13–0
1998	1	Tennessee	13–0
1999	1	Florida State	12–0
2000	1	Oklahoma	13–0
2001	1	Miami (FL)	12–0
2002	1	Ohio State	14–0
2003	2	LSU	13–1
2003	2	USC	12–1
2004	2	USC	13–0
2004	2	Auburn	13–0
2005	1	Texas	13–0
2006	1	Florida	13–1
2007	1	LSU	12–2
2008	1	Florida	13–1
2009	1	Alabama	14–0
2010	1	Auburn	14–0
2011	1	Alabama	12–1
2012	1	Alabama	13–1
2013	1	Florida State	14–0
2014	1	Ohio State	14–1
2015	1	Alabama	14–1
2016	1	Clemson	14–1
2017	2	Alabama	13–1
2017	2	UCF	13–0
2018	1	Clemson	15–0
2019	1	LSU	15–0
2020	1	Alabama	13–0
2021	1	Georgia	14–1
2022	1	Georgia	15–0
2023	1	Michigan	15–0
2024	1	Ohio State	14–2
2025	1	Indiana	16–0

== Other selectors ==
In addition to the NCAA-designated "major selectors" listed above, various other people and organizations have selected national champions in college football. Selections from such notable selectors are listed below.

=== Unique championship selections from non-major selectors ===
Teams in the following table were selected by people or organizations not listed as a "major selector" in the NCAA Football Bowl Subdivision Records book.

In the interest of brevity, this table contains only teams that were not also selected by any NCAA-designated major selector for the given year. Some are contrarian selections or protests against the choices of the major polls and the BCS.

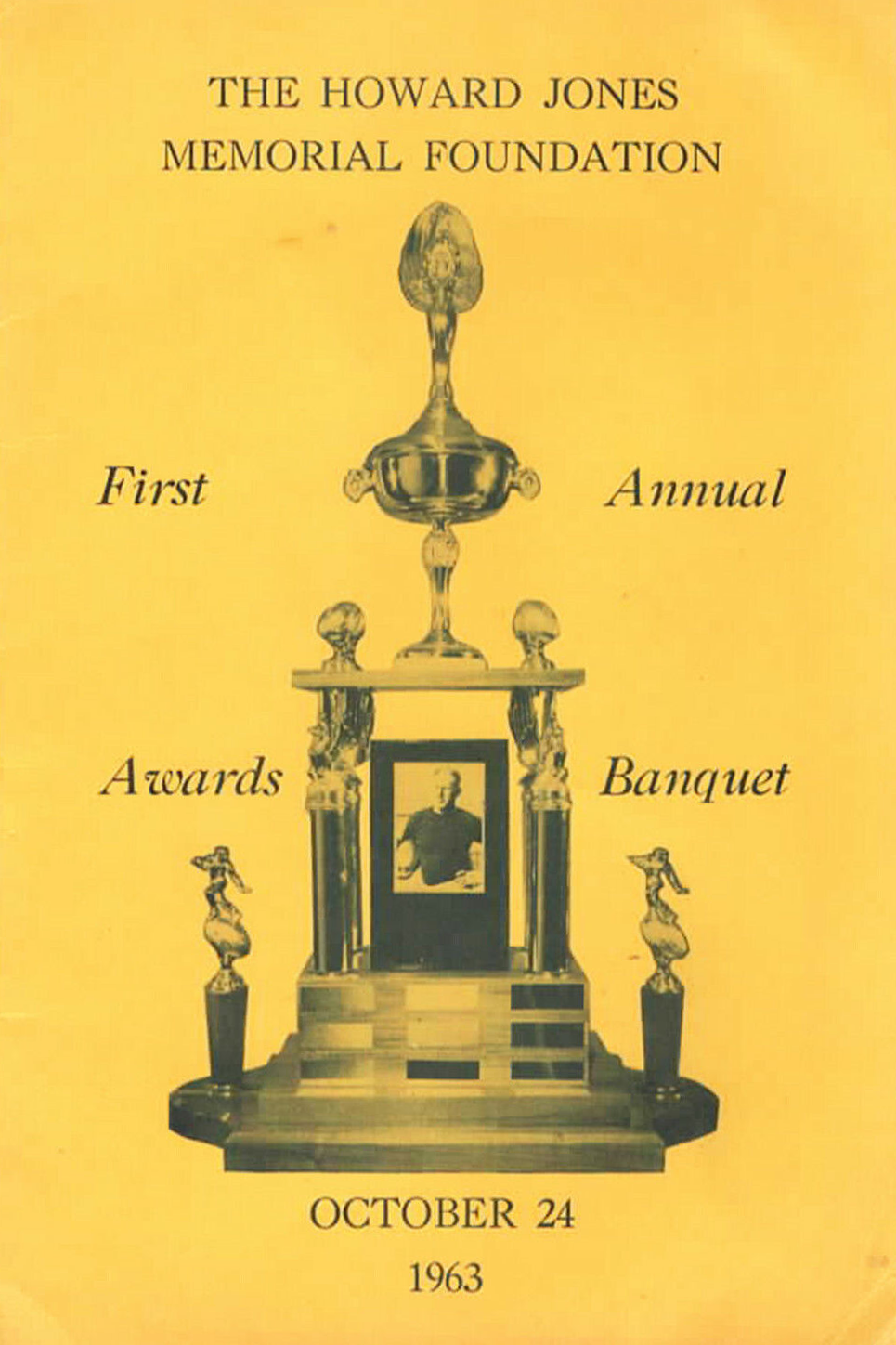
Howard Jones Memorial Foundation national championship trophy

Season	Champion(s)	Record	Coach	Selector(s)
1903	Minnesota^{co}	14–0–1	Henry L. Williams	Jim Koger (JK)
1904	Yale	10–1	Charles D. Rafferty	Caspar Whitney
1910	Washington	6–0	Gil Dobie	Bill Libby (BL)
1911	Carlisle	11–1	Pop Warner	BL
1913	Notre Dame	7–0	Jesse Harper	BL, JK
1914	Harvard	7–0–2	Percy Haughton	World Almanac, Alexander Weyand (AW)
1915	Washington State	7–0	William Dietz	Washington State Senate
1917	Pittsburgh^{co}	10–0	Pop Warner	AW
1921	Notre Dame	10–1	Knute Rockne	AW
1929	Tulane	9–0	Bernie Bierman	BL
1929	Utah	7–0	Ike Armstrong	Frank E. Wood
1931	Tennessee	9–0–1	Robert Neyland	BL
1931	Tulane	11–1	Bernie Bierman	Wood
1934	Pittsburgh	8–1	Jock Sutherland	Spalding's Foot Ball Guide (editor Walter R. Okeson)
1934	Stanford	9–1–1	Tiny Thornhill	Houlgate System (HS)
1935	Stanford	8–1	Tiny Thornhill	Kenneth Massey (MCFR)
1936	Northwestern	7–1	Pappy Waldorf	BL
1936	Saint Vincent	5–3	Red Edwards	Associated Press sportswriter via transitive wins and losses
1936	Santa Clara	8–1	Buck Shaw	MCFR
1939	Tulane	8–1–1	Red Dawson	HS
1941	Duquesne	8–0	Aldo Donelli/Steve Sinko	MCFR
1942	Georgia Navy Pre-Flight	7–1–1	Raymond Wolf	MCFR
1943	March Field	9–1	Paul J. Schissler	MCFR
1944	Randolph Field	12–0	Frank Tritico	Dr. L. H. Baker
1947	Texas	10–1	Blair Cherry	MCFR
1953	Michigan State	9–1	Biggie Munn	MCFR
1955	Ole Miss	10–1	Johnny Vaught	MCFR
1963	Navy	9–2	Wayne Hardin	Washington Touchdown Club
1974	Alabama	11–1	Paul "Bear" Bryant	Washington Touchdown Club
1978	Penn State	11–1	Joe Paterno	Washington Touchdown Club
2004	Auburn	13–0	Tommy Tuberville	Eufaula Tribune, Golf Digest, People's National Championship
2010	Oregon^{co}	12–1	Chip Kelly	R(FACT)
2014	Alabama^{co}	12–2	Nick Saban	R(FACT)
2014	Oregon^{co}	12–1	Mark Helfrich	R(FACT)
2014	TCU^{co}	12–1	Gary Patterson	R(FACT)

Notes

- Teams listed in italics indicate retroactively applied championships.
- Co-champion selections are indicated by ^{co}.

== See also ==
- List of NCAA college football rankings
- List of NCAA Division I FBS football programs
- National championships in men's college basketball
