= Howard Jones Memorial Foundation =

Athletic foundation

The Howard Jones Memorial Foundation is a Los Angeles-based athletic foundation dedicated to the memory of Howard Jones, the USC Trojans football coach from 1925 to 1940.

The foundation made college football national championship selections starting in 1962 and awarded the Howard Jones Memorial Trophy to their national champion. The award was voted upon by Los Angeles Press Club sportswriters.

== Howard Jones Memorial Trophy ==
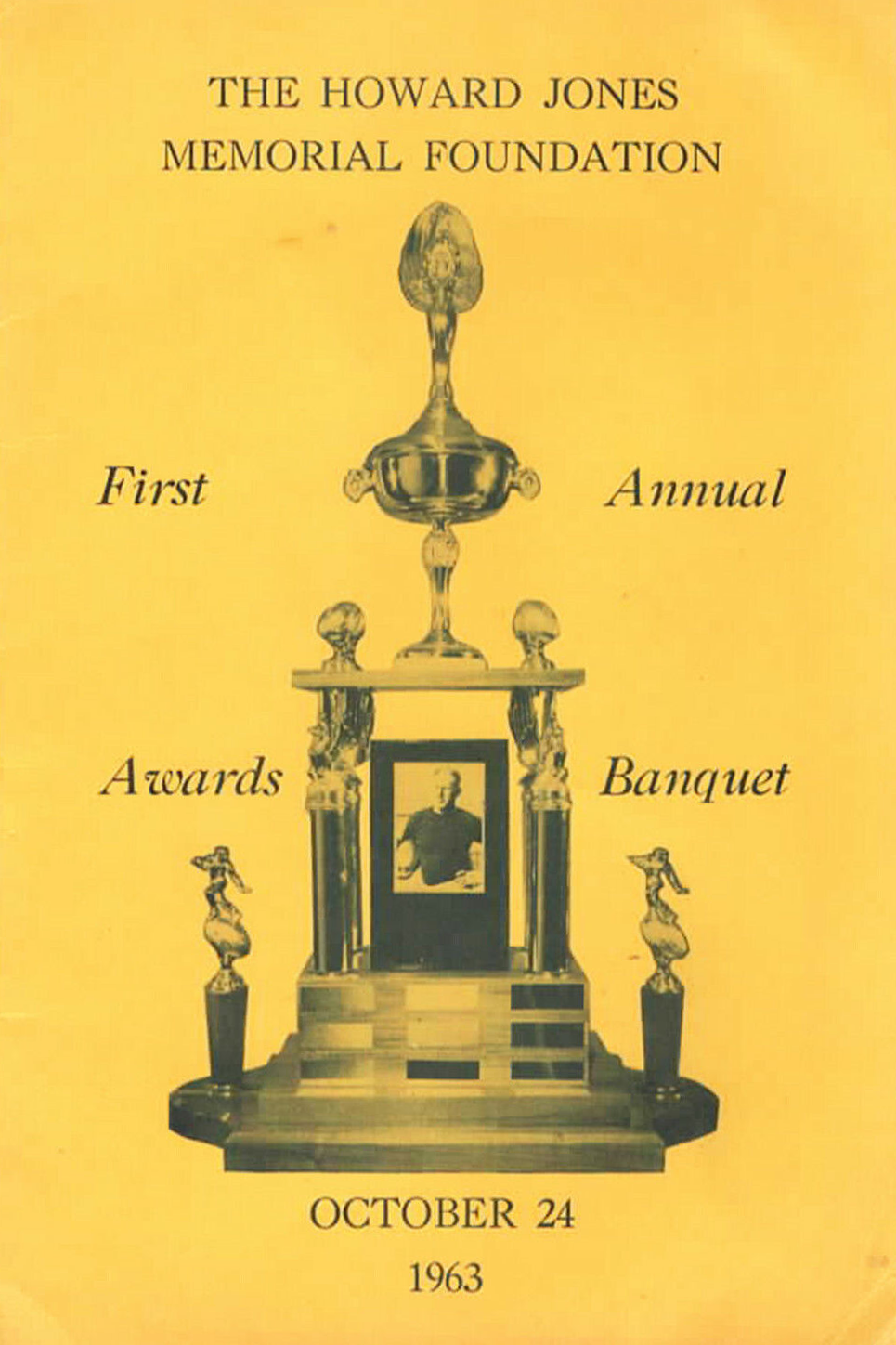
Howard Jones Memorial Foundation Awards Banquet, October 24, 1963

=== National champions ===
Season	Team	Head coach	Record
1962	USC	John McKay	11–0
1963	Texas	Darrell Royal	11–0
1964	Notre Dame	Ara Parseghian	9–1
1965	Michigan State	Duffy Daugherty	10–1
1966	Notre Dame	Ara Parseghian	9–0–1
1966	Michigan State	Duffy Daugherty	9–0–1
1967	USC	John McKay	10–1
1968	Ohio State	Woody Hayes	10–0
1969	Texas	Darrell Royal	11–0
