= FWAA-NFF Super 16 Poll =

Ranking of top 16 college football teams

The FWAA-NFF Grantland Rice Super 16 poll is a weekly ranking of the top 16 college football teams in the NCAA Football Bowl Subdivision beginning with the 2014 season. It is named in part for sports writer Grantland Rice. The 36 poll voters include 26 members of the Football Writers Association of America, with the remaining 10 voters each coming from the National Football Foundation or College Football Hall of Fame.

The final poll is issued at the end of the regular season, but before bowl games. The poll joins the AP Poll, Coaches Poll and others as periodic snapshot rankings of college football teams. Prior to the 2014 season, these polls were used in part to determine which two teams would play for the national title under the Bowl Championship Series and its predecessors. The College Football Playoff, which also began in 2014, does not use poll data to choose its participants. After every College Football Playoff championship game, the FWAA/NFF selects a national champion, and awards it the MacArthur Bowl.

== See also ==
- College football national championships in NCAA Division I FBS
- Dickinson System
- Grantland Rice Trophy
- Harris Interactive College Football Poll
- Mythical national championship
