= Grantland Rice Trophy =

Annual college football award

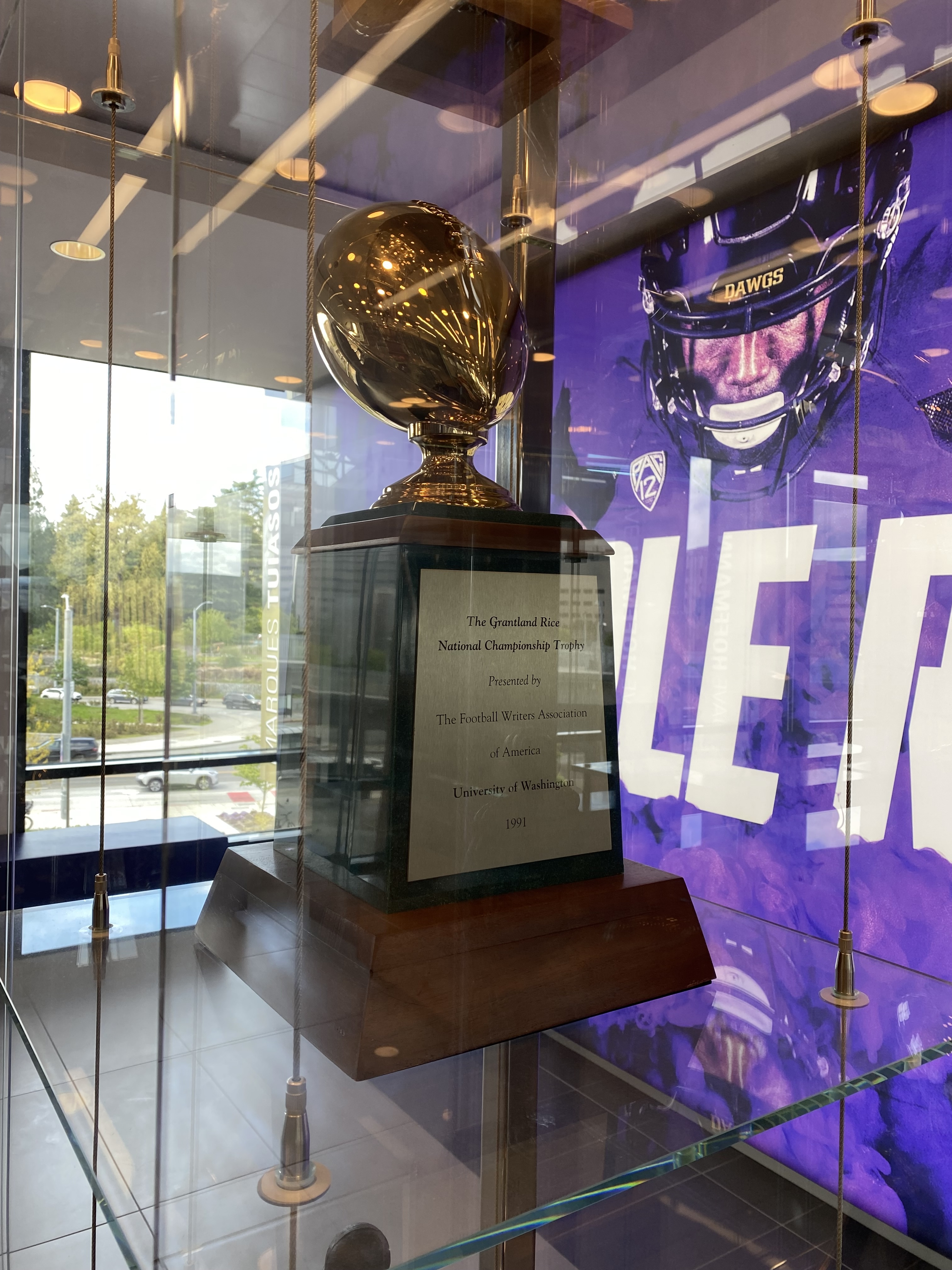
- The 1991 trophy awarded to Washington
- Country: United States
- Presented by: Football Writers Association of America (FWAA)

History
- First award: 1954
- Final award: 2013
- Most recent: Florida State
- Website: FWAA Awards

The Grantland Rice Trophy or Grantland Rice Award was an annual award presented in the United States from 1954 to 2013 to the college football team recognized by the Football Writers Association of America (FWAA) as the national champions.

Named for the legendary sportswriter Grantland Rice, the trophy was presented annually after the college football bowl games. A committee of five writers from different areas was appointed each season to select a champion by secret ballot. Voting was conducted initially by a positional voting system but after 1994 by a single-team vote. Beginning in 2002, the FWAA also began issuing a national poll to go along with the Grantland Rice Trophy. The top team in the final poll was awarded the trophy. The trophy itself consisted of a bronze football atop a four-sided pedestal.

On August 26, 2010, the FWAA announced that the 2004 award presented to the USC Trojans had been rescinded, the first time in the award's history that a winner has vacated the honor. The FWAA declined to name a replacement for that year's award.

With the advent of the College Football Playoff (CFP) for the 2014 season, the FWAA quietly retired the Grantland Rice Trophy, joining with the National Football Foundation (NFF) to instead publish the FWAA-NFF Grantland Rice Super 16 Poll during the regular season, with the CFP champion automatically receiving the NFF's MacArthur Bowl Trophy.

== Winners ==
Season	Team	Conference	Head coach	Record
1954	UCLA	Pacific Coast	Henry Russell Sanders	9–0
1955	Oklahoma	Big 7	Bud Wilkinson	11–0
1956	Oklahoma	Big 7	Bud Wilkinson	10–0
1957	Ohio State	Big Ten	Woody Hayes	9–1
1958	Iowa	Big Ten	Forest Evashevski	8–1–1
1959	Syracuse	Independent	Ben Schwartzwalder	11–0
1960	Ole Miss	SEC	Johnny Vaught	10–0–1
1961	Ohio State	Big Ten	Woody Hayes	8–0–1
1962	USC	AAWU	John McKay	11–0
1963	Texas	Southwest	Darrell Royal	11–0
1964	Arkansas	Southwest	Frank Broyles	11–0
1965	Alabama; Michigan State (joint)	SEC; Big Ten	Bear Bryant; Duffy Daugherty	9–1–1; 10–1
1966	Notre Dame	Independent	Ara Parseghian	9–0–1
1967	USC	AAWU	John McKay	10–1
1968	Ohio State	Big Ten	Woody Hayes	10–0
1969	Texas	Southwest	Darrell Royal	11–0
1970	Nebraska	Big 8	Bob Devaney	11–0–1
1971	Nebraska	Big 8	Bob Devaney	13–0
1972	USC	Pac-8	John McKay	12–0
1973	Notre Dame	Independent	Ara Parseghian	11–0
1974	USC	Pac-8	John McKay	10–1–1
1975	Oklahoma	Big 8	Barry Switzer	11–1
1976	Pittsburgh	Independent	Johnny Majors	12–0
1977	Notre Dame	Independent	Dan Devine	11–1
1978	Alabama	SEC	Bear Bryant	11–1
1979	Alabama	SEC	Bear Bryant	12–0
1980	Georgia	SEC	Vince Dooley	12–0
1981	Clemson	ACC	Danny Ford	12–0
1982	Penn State	Independent	Joe Paterno	11–1
1983	Miami (FL)	Independent	Howard Schnellenberger	11–1
1984	BYU	WAC	LaVell Edwards	13–0
1985	Oklahoma	Big 8	Barry Switzer	11–1
1986	Penn State	Independent	Joe Paterno	12–0
1987	Miami (FL)	Independent	Jimmy Johnson	12–0
1988	Notre Dame	Independent	Lou Holtz	12–0
1989	Miami (FL)	Independent	Dennis Erickson	11–1
1990	Colorado	Big 8	Bill McCartney	11–1–1
1991	Washington	Pac-10	Don James	12–0
1992	Alabama	SEC	Gene Stallings	13–0
1993	Florida State	ACC	Bobby Bowden	12–1
1994	Nebraska	Big 8	Tom Osborne	13–0
1995	Nebraska	Big 8	Tom Osborne	12–0
1996	Florida	SEC	Steve Spurrier	12–1
1997	Michigan	Big Ten	Lloyd Carr	12–0
1998	Tennessee	SEC	Phillip Fulmer	13–0
1999	Florida State	ACC	Bobby Bowden	12–0
2000	Oklahoma	Big 12	Bob Stoops	13–0
2001	Miami (FL)	Big East	Larry Coker	12–0
2002	Ohio State	Big Ten	Jim Tressel	14–0
2003	USC	Pac-10	Pete Carroll	12–1
2004	None (The 13-0 USC Trojans were stripped of the title.)			
2005	Texas	Big 12	Mack Brown	13–0
2006	Florida	SEC	Urban Meyer	13–1
2007	LSU	SEC	Les Miles	12–2
2008	Florida	SEC	Urban Meyer	13–1
2009	Alabama	SEC	Nick Saban	14–0
2010	Auburn	SEC	Gene Chizik	14–0
2011	Alabama	SEC	Nick Saban	12–1
2012	Alabama	SEC	Nick Saban	13–1
2013	Florida State	ACC	Jimbo Fisher	14–0

=== By team ===
Team	Number	Seasons
Alabama	7	1965, 1978, 1979, 1992, 2009, 2011, 2012
Oklahoma	5	1955, 1956, 1975, 1985, 2000
USC	5	1962, 1967, 1972, 1974, 2003
Miami (FL)	4	1983, 1987, 1989, 2001
Nebraska	4	1970, 1971, 1994, 1995
Notre Dame	4	1966, 1973, 1977, 1988
Ohio State	4	1957, 1961, 1968, 2002
Florida	3	1996, 2006, 2008
Florida State	3	1993, 1999, 2013
Texas	3	1963, 1969, 2005
Penn State	2	1982, 1986
Auburn	1	2010
Arkansas	1	1964
BYU	1	1984
Clemson	1	1981
Colorado	1	1990
Georgia	1	1980
Iowa	1	1958
LSU	1	2007
Michigan	1	1997
Michigan State	1	1965
Ole Miss	1	1960
Pittsburgh	1	1976
Syracuse	1	1959
Tennessee	1	1998
UCLA	1	1954
Washington	1	1991
