= The Eufaula Tribune =

Alabama newspaper

- Type: Weekly newspaper
- Language: English
- City: Eufaula, Alabama
- Website: dothaneagle.com/news/community/eufaula-tribune

The Eufaula Tribune is a newspaper based in Eufaula, Alabama.
