= Coaches Poll =

Weekly ranking of US college sports teams

Current Coaches Polls
- FBS football: 2026 season
- FCS football: 2026 season
- Div I men's basketball: 2026–27 season
- Div I women's basketball: 2026–27 season
- Div I baseball: 2026 season

In the United States, the Coaches Poll is a weekly ranking of the top 25 NCAA Division I Football Bowl Subdivision (FBS) college football, Division I college basketball, and Division I college baseball teams. The football version of the poll has been known officially as the US LBM Coaches Poll since 2023.

The football rankings are compiled by the US LBM Board of Coaches which is made up of 62 head coaches at Division I FBS institutions. All coaches are members of the American Football Coaches Association (AFCA). The basketball rankings are compiled by the USA Today Sports Board of Coaches which is made up of 32 head coaches at Division I institutions. All are members of the National Association of Basketball Coaches (NABC). The baseball rankings are compiled by the USA Today Sports Board of Coaches which is made up of 31 head coaches at Division I institutions. All are members of the American Baseball Coaches Association (ABCA).

The football Coaches Poll was an element of the Bowl Championship Series (BCS) rankings, a voting system used from 1998 to 2013 to determine the teams to play in the BCS National Championship Game.

== History ==
The Coaches Poll began selecting the "Top 20" teams on a weekly basis during the 1950-1951 college football and basketball seasons. For the 1990-1991 football and basketball seasons, the poll expanded to a "Top 25," and it has retained this format since. It was initially published by United Press – known from 1958 as United Press International (UPI) – from 1950 through 1990, followed by USA Today/CNN from 1991 thru 1996, USA Today/ESPN from 1997 to 2004, and USA Today from 2005 to the present.

In February 2014, Amway was announced as the title sponsor of the college football Coaches Poll, which became known officially as the Amway Coaches Poll. The basketball and baseball polls were not sponsored by Amway and did not adopt this name. In August 2023, US LBM, a distributor of specialty building materials, became the football poll's new title sponsor in a deal that will run through at least the 2026 season.

=== College football ===
==== Year-by-year final Coaches poll football champions ====
Through the 1973 season, the final Coaches Poll was released in early December, after the regular season, but before the bowl games. Beginning with the 1974 season, the Coaches Poll has conducted its final poll in January, after the bowl games.

Although the coaches' football poll has generally been in accord with the Associated Press (AP) Poll there have been years where the polls disagree. Eleven times – in 1954, 1957, 1965, 1970, 1973, 1974, 1978, 1990, 1991, 1997, and 2003 – the Coaches Poll has crowned a different national champion than the AP Poll, causing consternation among some college football fans. Until 1974, the final Coaches Poll was taken before the bowl games, while the final AP poll was taken after the bowls starting with the 1968 season (also in 1965, but not in 1966 or 1967). This was changed after the 1973 season, when Alabama was crowned as the Coaches Poll national champion in December, yet lost the Sugar Bowl to Notre Dame on New Year's Eve. The same situation occurred in 1970, when No. 5 Notre Dame beat No. 1 Texas 24–11 in the Cotton Bowl and Nebraska won the Associated Press national title. In the preceding decade, the UPI coaches poll national champion lost its bowl game three times: 1960 (Minnesota), 1964 (Alabama), and 1965 (Michigan State).

The change to the January final poll was well-timed as the top-ranked team in the UPI coaches poll lost its bowl game five more times in the 1970s: in 1974 (Alabama), 1975 (Ohio State), 1977 (Texas), 1978 (Penn State), and 1979 (Ohio State). The sole exception was undefeated Pittsburgh in 1976.

Since the 1974 season, teams on probation are not recognized in the poll of coaches while the AP permits their inclusion. That year, Oklahoma was serving a second year of probation, went undefeated, and were AP champions; they were unlisted in the UPI coaches' poll, whose champion was USC.

The UPI Trophy, known as the "UPI Cup", was awarded to the Coaches Poll winner prior to the introduction of the Coaches' Trophy in 1986.

Starting in 1991, USA Today / CNN took over operation of the Coaches Poll from UPI and awarded the Coaches' Trophy.

The team that finishes first in the coaches' poll is currently awarded with the AFCA National Championship Trophy—from its inception through 2014, the winner of the BCS National Championship Game and its precursors was contractually named the #1 team on the Coaches Poll, and awarded the trophy in a post-game presentation. With the replacement of the BCS by the College Football Playoff in 2014, the trophy will still be awarded, but in a separate ceremony some time following the College Football Playoff National Championship (which chose to award its own trophy), and the Coaches' Poll is no longer obligated to name the winner of the game as its post-season #1.

The Coaches Poll has come under criticism for being inaccurate, with some of the charges being that coaches are biased towards their own teams and conferences, that coaches don't actually complete their own ballots, and that coaches are unfamiliar with even the basics, such as whether a team is undefeated or not, about teams they are voting on. In 2012, USC Trojans coach Lane Kiffin resigned as a voter after just one vote amidst controversy over his preseason selection of his school as No. 1. Kiffin told reporters, "I would not vote USC No. 1, I can tell you that much." However, USA Today, citing the need to "protect the poll's integrity", revealed that Kiffin had voted his team for the top spot. Kiffin apologized and explained that his comments were from the perspective of an opposing coach voting for USC.

The American Football Coaches Association began publishing a Division II Top 25 Coaches' Poll in 2000 and a Division III Top 25 Coaches' Poll in 1999. Before this poll, regional rankings were used instead.

=== College basketball ===
Beginning in 1992–93, USA Today and CNN took over publishing the coaches' basketball poll for UPI. Beginning in the 1993–94 basketball season, the Coaches Poll began publishing its final poll after the NCAA basketball tournament. From the 1993 to 1997 seasons, the poll was co-sponsored by USA Today, Cable News Network, and the NABC. Finally, in 1997–98, ESPN joined as a co-sponsor of the Coaches Poll along with USA Today and the NABC where selected NABC members serve as the voting block for the poll. ESPN retains its involvement in the basketball poll despite no longer being involved in the football poll.

=== College baseball ===
USA Today and ESPN also publish a top 25 college baseball poll for NCAA Division I baseball, known as the USA Today/ESPN Top 25 coaches' baseball poll. The poll began in 1992. The poll appears in the preseason, then begins weekly after week 2 of the season through the end of conference tournaments. A final poll is released after the conclusion of the College World Series.

== See also ==
- AP Poll
- Mythical National Championship
- College football national championships in NCAA Division I FBS
- Dickinson System
- FWAA-NFF Grantland Rice Super 16 Poll
- Harris Interactive College Football Poll
- List of NCAA college football rankings
- NAIA Coaches' Poll
