= 1931 VPI Gobblers football team =

American college football season

1931 VPI Gobblers football
- Conference: Southern Conference
- Record: 3–4–2 (1–4–1 SoCon)
- Head coach: Orville Neal (2nd season)
- Captain: Charles Eugene Brown
- Home stadium: Miles Stadium

1931 Southern Conference football standings
	Conf.					Overall
Team	W		L		T	W		L		T
No. 2 Tulane $	8	–	0	–	0	11	–	1	–	0
No. 3 Tennessee	6	–	0	–	1	9	–	0	–	1
Alabama	7	–	1	–	0	9	–	1	–	0
No. 6 Georgia	6	–	1	–	0	8	–	2	–	0
Maryland	4	–	1	–	1	8	–	1	–	1
Kentucky	4	–	2	–	2	5	–	2	–	2
LSU	3	–	2	–	0	5	–	4	–	0
South Carolina	3	–	3	–	1	5	–	4	–	1
Duke	3	–	3	–	1	5	–	3	–	2
Auburn	3	–	3	–	0	5	–	3	–	0
Sewanee	3	–	3	–	0	6	–	3	–	1
Vanderbilt	3	–	4	–	0	5	–	4	–	0
North Carolina	2	–	3	–	3	4	–	3	–	3
Washington and Lee	2	–	3	–	0	4	–	5	–	1
Florida	2	–	4	–	2	2	–	6	–	2
Georgia Tech	2	–	4	–	1	2	–	7	–	1
VMI	2	–	4	–	0	3	–	6	–	1
NC State	2	–	4	–	0	3	–	6	–	0
VPI	1	–	4	–	1	3	–	4	–	2
Clemson	1	–	4	–	0	1	–	6	–	2
Ole Miss	1	–	5	–	0	2	–	6	–	1
Virginia	0	–	5	–	1	2	–	6	–	1
Mississippi A&M	0	–	5	–	0	2	–	6	–	0
$ – Conference champion; Rankings from Dickinson System

The 1931 VPI Gobblers football team represented Virginia Agricultural and Mechanical College and Polytechnic Institute in the 1931 Southern Conference football season. The team was led by their head coach Orville Neal and finished with a record of three wins, four losses and two ties (3–4–2).

== Schedule ==
Date	Time	Opponent	Site	Result	Attendance	Source
September 26		King*	Miles Stadium; Blacksburg, VA	W 33–0		
October 3	3:00 p.m.	at Georgia	Sanford Stadium; Athens, GA	L 0–40	15,000	
October 10		Davidson*	Miles Stadium; Blacksburg, VA	W 18–6		
October 17	2:30 p.m.	vs. William & Mary*	City Stadium; Richmond, VA	T 6–6		
October 24	2:30 p.m.	at Kentucky	McLean Stadium; Lexington, KY	L 6–20	6,000	
October 31		Maryland^{†}	Miles Stadium; Blacksburg, VA	L 0–20	5,000	
November 7		vs. Washington and Lee	Maher Field; Roanoke, VA	L 0–6	5,000	
November 14		at Virginia	Scott Stadium; Charlottesville, VA (rivalry)	T 0–0	7,000	
November 26		vs. VMI	Maher Field; Roanoke, VA (rivalry)	W 13–6	18,000	
*Non-conference game; ^{†}Homecoming; All times are in Eastern time

== Before the season ==
The 1930 VPI Gobblers football team compiled a 5–3–1 record and were led by Orville Neal in his first season as head coach.

== Game summaries ==
=== King ===
King vs. VPI

Team	1	2	3	4	Total
King	0	0	0	0	0
• VPI	14	13	0	6	33

- Date: September 26, 1931
- Location: Miles Stadium
  Blacksburg, VA

VPI's first game of the season was a victory over King at Miles Stadium.

The starting lineup for VPI was: Chandler (left end), Stark (left tackle), Swart (left guard), Brown (center), Hite (right guard), Grinus (right tackle), Seaman (right end), Groth (quarterback), Casey (left halfback), Robison (right halfback), Porterfield (fullback). The substitutes were: Dyke, Hall, Hardwick, Hoenstine, Jennings, Kasun, Kelsey, Miles, Morgan, Oliver, Ottley, Palmer, Sifford, Simmons and Yorke.

The starting lineup for King was: Klein (left end), Cox (left tackle), Bell (left guard), Owens (center), Cook (right guard), Robinson (right tackle), Bricker (right end), Arnold (quarterback), Isaac (left halfback), Harris (right halfback), Barnett (fullback). The substitutes were: Emert, Flenore and Gannaway.

=== Georgia ===
VPI at Georgia

Team	1	2	3	4	Total
VPI	0	0	0	0	0
• Georgia	13	13	14	0	40

- Date: October 3, 1931
- Location: Sanford Stadium
  Athens, GA
- Game start: 3:00 p.m.
- Game attendance: 15,000
- Referee: Buck Flowers

After their victory over King, VPI played the University of Georgia at Sanford Stadium in Athens, Georgia.

The starting lineup for VPI was: Seaman (left end), Stark (left tackle), Hite (left guard), Brown (center), Swart (right guard), Grinus (right tackle), Chandler (right end), Groth (quarterback), Casey (left halfback), Robison (right halfback), Porterfield (fullback).

The starting lineup for Georgia was: Vernon Smith (left end), Robert Rose (left tackle), Ralph Maddox (left guard), Graham Batchelor (center), Milton Leathers (right guard), James Hamrick (right tackle), Weddington Kelley (right end), Austin Downes (quarterback), Spud Chandler (left halfback), Marion Dickens (right halfback), Jack Roberts (fullback). The substitutes were: Homer Key, Wendell Sullivan and Jodie Whire.

=== Davidson ===
Davidson vs. VPI

Team	1	2	3	4	Total
Davidson	0	6	0	0	6
• VPI	0	0	0	18	18

- Date: October 10, 1931
- Location: Miles Stadium
  Blacksburg, VA
- Referee: Richard Carrington (UVA)

The starting lineup for VPI was: Palmer (left end), Stark (left tackle), Hite (left guard), Brown (center), Swart (right guard), Grinus (right tackle), Chandler (right end), Porterfield (quarterback), Casey (left halfback), Hardwick (right halfback), Robison (fullback). The substitutes were: Murphy and Ottley.

The starting lineup for Davidson was: Lelon Raker (left end), John Wagner (left tackle), Graham Mathis (left guard), Ulrich Gardner (center), Powhatan Conway (right guard), Whitfield (right tackle), Robert Johnston (right end), Donald King (quarterback), Charles Pearce (left halfback), Edward Peabody (right halfback), Donald McQueen (fullback). The substitutes were: Barrier, Eugene Cannon, Jerome Clark, William Flinn, Calvin Kuykendall, John McConnell, McElrath, Allen Mills, Frederick Ogden and West.

=== William & Mary ===
William & Mary vs. VPI

Team	1	2	3	4	Total
W&M	0	6	0	0	6
VPI	0	6	0	0	6

- Date: October 17, 1931
- Location: City Stadium
  Richmond, VA
- Referee: Richard Carrington (UVA)

The starting lineup for VPI was: Seaman (left end), Stark (left tackle), Murphy (left guard), Brown (center), Swart (right guard), Grinus (right tackle), Palmer (right end), Hardwick (quarterback), Casey (left halfback), Groth (right halfback), Robison (fullback). The substitutes were: Hite, Ottley and Porterfield.

The starting lineup for William & Mary was: Bob Henderson (left end), Otis Douglas (left tackle), George Fisher (left guard), Thomas Ayers (center), Edwin Meade (right guard), Gerry Quirk (right tackle), Thomas Halligan (right end), Edward Bergin (quarterback), Barrett Roberts (left halfback), William Palese (right halfback), Butch Constantino (fullback). The substitutes were: Harold Balkan, E. A. DeBordenave, Aime LaCroix and Nash Lindsey.

=== Kentucky ===
VPI at Kentucky

Team	1	2	3	4	Total
VPI	0	6	0	0	6
• Kentucky	7	0	7	6	20

- Date: October 24, 1931
- Location: McLean Stadium
  Lexington, KY
- Game start: 2:30 p.m.
- Game attendance: 6,000
- Game weather: "Soggy and muggy"
- Referee: Frank Lane

The starting lineup for VPI was: Palmer (left end), Stark (left tackle), Murphy (left guard), Brown (center), Hite (right guard), Grinus (right tackle), Seaman (right end), Groth (quarterback), Casey (left halfback), Robison (right halfback), Howard (fullback). The substitutes were: Betts, Chandler, English, Hardwick, Hoenstine, Miles, Morgan, Ottley, Porterfield, Simmons and Swart.

The starting lineup for Kentucky was: Noah Duff (left end), Ralph Wright (left tackle), O. L. "Bud" Davidson (left guard), Frank Seale (center), Darrell Darby (right guard), Kenneth Andrews (right tackle), George Skinner (right end), Dick Richards (quarterback), Shipwreck Kelly (left halfback), Cecil Urbaniak (right halfback), Ralph Kercheval (fullback). The substitutes were: Stanley Bach, Thomas Cassady, M. J. "Bud" Cavana, Engel, Foster, Janes, Ellis T. Johnson, Robert Kipping, Howard Kreuter, William Luther, Robert Montgomery, Doug Parrish, Holton Pribble, Newell Wilder, Worthington and George Yates.

=== Maryland ===
Maryland vs. VPI

Team	1	2	3	4	Total
• Maryland	0	13	7	0	20
VPI	0	0	0	0	0

- Date: October 31, 1931
- Location: Miles Stadium
  Blacksburg, VA
- Game attendance: 5,000
- Game weather: "Chilly"

VPI's 1931 homecoming game was a loss to Maryland.

The starting lineup for VPI was: Seaman (left end), Stark (left tackle), Hite (left guard), Brown (center), Swart (right guard), Hoenstine (right tackle), Palmer (right end), Groth (quarterback), Hardwick (left halfback), Porterfield (right halfback), Robison (fullback). The substitutes were: Casey, Howard and Murphy.

The starting lineup for Maryland was: Alfred Pease (left end), Ernie Carliss (left tackle), Courtney Hayden (left guard), Parker Faber (center), Jesse Krajcovic (right guard), George Cole (right tackle), Jack Norris (right end), Charles May (quarterback), Boze Berger (left halfback), George V. Chalmers (right halfback), Ray Poppelman (fullback). The substitutes were: Charles Keenan, Paul Kiernan and John Mitchell.

=== Washington and Lee ===
Washington & Lee vs. VPI

Team	1	2	3	4	Total
• W&L	0	6	0	0	6
VPI	0	0	0	0	0

- Date: November 7, 1931
- Location: Maher Field
  Roanoke, VA
- Game attendance: 5,000
- Referee: Lane (W&J)

The starting lineup for VPI was: Palmer (left end), Stark (left tackle), Hite (left guard), Brown (center), Dyke (right guard), Grinus (right tackle), Chandler (right end), Ottley (quarterback), Hardwick (left halfback), Robison (right halfback), Howard (fullback). The substitutes were: Casey, Groth, Morgan, Porterfield, Seaman and Swart.

The starting lineup for Washington and Lee was: Solomon Mosovich (left end), Thomasson Boland (left tackle), Amos Bolen (left guard), Patrick Mitchell (center), Charles Tilson (right guard), Robert Morris (right tackle), John Hanley (right end), Louis Wilson (quarterback), Wilbur Mattox (left halfback), Eugene Martin (right halfback), Frank Bailey (fullback). The substitutes were: William Grove and Joseph Sawyers.

=== Virginia ===
VPI at Virginia

Team	1	2	3	4	Total
VPI	0	0	0	0	0
Virginia	0	0	0	0	0

- Date: November 14, 1931
- Location: Scott Stadium
  Charlottesville, VA
- Game attendance: 7,000
- Referee: Frank Lane

The starting lineup for VPI was: Chandler (left end), Stark (left tackle), Hite (left guard), Brown (center), Dyke (right guard), Grinus (right tackle), Palmer (right end), Howard (quarterback), Casey (left halfback), Hardwick (right halfback), Robison (fullback). The substitutes were: Groth, Ottley and Porterfield.

The starting lineup for Virginia was: William Condon (left end), Charles Poss (left tackle), Herbert Bryant (left guard), Lewis Reiss (center), Bill DeButts (right guard), Ray Burger (right tackle), Gene Wager (right end), William Edgar (quarterback), William Thomas (left halfback), Douglas Myers (right halfback), Ward Brewer (fullback).

=== VMI ===
VMI vs. VPI

Team	1	2	3	4	Total
VMI	0	6	0	0	6
• VPI	0	0	6	7	13

- Date: November 26, 1931
- Location: Maher Field
  Roanoke, VA
- Game attendance: 18,000
- Game weather: "Balmy November weather"
- Referee: Black (Davidson)

The starting lineup for VPI was: Seaman (left end), Stark (left tackle), Hite (left guard), Brown (center), Betts (right guard), Grinus (right tackle), Swart (right end), Groth (quarterback), Hardwick (left halfback), Porterfield (right halfback), Robison (fullback). The substitutes were: Casey and Howard.

The starting lineup for VMI was: John Gill (left end), Pus Hilliard (left tackle), Al Rochelle (left guard), James Rea (center), Arthur Marklis (right guard), Charles Straub (right tackle), Randolph Gregory (right end), William Smith (quarterback), Paul Travers (left halfback), Tucker Watkins (right halfback), Ralph Waite (fullback). The substitutes were: Charles Bailey, William Kaylor, Ed Kostainsek, Jack Lavinder, Louis Seigel, Irvin Smith, Eugene Spaulding and Fred Urick.

== Players ==
=== Roster ===
VPI 1931 roster
William Earle Betts; Charles Eugene Brown (Capt.); Alfred Layden Casey; Edwin F. Chandler; Earl E. Dyke; Edward "Red" English; Bill Grinus; Heinie Groth; Earl Jenis Hall; Samuel Elkana Hardwick; Eugene Goliday Hite; Garland Woodrow Hoenstine; Frank A. Howard; Wiley Leroy Jennings; M. J. "Red" Kasun; Kelsey	John A. McIntire; W. L. "Sonny" Miles; Charles Morgan; John Marshall Murphy; Keith Millner Oliver; Waightes Gibbs Ottley; Benny Palmer; William Breckenridge Porterfield; Carl Francis Robison; Alfred Elsworth Seaman; Henry DeWitt Shank; Sifford; Leon Dalmain Simmons; Harry Hyman Stark; James L. Swart; John Lester Yorke

=== Monogram Club members ===
Eighteen players received monograms for their participation on the 1931 VPI team.

Player	Hometown	Notes
William Earle Betts	Richmond, Virginia	World War II veteran (Captain, Army Corps of Engineers). Awarded the Bronze Star Medal and Croix de Guerre.
Charles Eugene "Dolly" Brown	Portsmouth, Virginia	
Alfred Layden Casey	Portsmouth, Virginia	
Edwin F. Chandler	Newport News, Virginia	World War II veteran (Commander, Naval Reserve).
Earl E. Dyke	Newport News, Virginia	
Bill Grinus	Orient, Illinois	
Charles Alexander "Heinie" Groth	Cedar Rapids, Iowa	
Earl Jenis "Bus" Hall	Princeton, West Virginia	
Samuel Elkana Hardwick	Dublin, Virginia	
Frank A. Howard	Childress, Virginia	
John Marshall Murphy	Knoxville, Tennessee	
Waightes Gibbs Ottley	Norfolk, Virginia	
Benny Palmer	Newport News, Virginia	
William Breckenridge Porterfield, Jr.	Glade Spring, Virginia	World War II veteran (Lieutenant Commander, Navy).
Carl Francis Robison	Watertown, New York	World War II veteran (Lieutenant Commander, Navy). Awarded the Navy Cross.
Alfred Elsworth Seaman	Pontiac, Michigan	World War II veteran (Sergeant, Army).
Harry Hyman Stark	Portsmouth, Virginia	
James L. Swart		

== Coaching and training staff ==
- Head coach: Orville Neal
- Assistant coaches
  - P. Hotchkiss
  - Herbert McEver
  - Line coach: Lyal Clark
- Manager: H. D. Shank
- Freshman head coach: Henry Redd
- Freshman Manager: W. H. Walthall
