= 1931 Georgia Bulldogs football team =

American college football season

1931 Georgia Bulldogs football
- Conference: Southern Conference
- Record: 8–2 (6–1 SoCon)
- Head coach: Harry Mehre (4th season)
- Captain: Austin Downes
- Home stadium: Sanford Stadium

Uniform
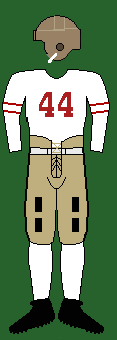

1931 Southern Conference football standings
	Conf.					Overall
Team	W		L		T	W		L		T
No. 2 Tulane $	8	–	0	–	0	11	–	1	–	0
No. 3 Tennessee	6	–	0	–	1	9	–	0	–	1
Alabama	7	–	1	–	0	9	–	1	–	0
No. 6 Georgia	6	–	1	–	0	8	–	2	–	0
Maryland	4	–	1	–	1	8	–	1	–	1
Kentucky	4	–	2	–	2	5	–	2	–	2
LSU	3	–	2	–	0	5	–	4	–	0
South Carolina	3	–	3	–	1	5	–	4	–	1
Duke	3	–	3	–	1	5	–	3	–	2
Auburn	3	–	3	–	0	5	–	3	–	0
Sewanee	3	–	3	–	0	6	–	3	–	1
Vanderbilt	3	–	4	–	0	5	–	4	–	0
North Carolina	2	–	3	–	3	4	–	3	–	3
Washington and Lee	2	–	3	–	0	4	–	5	–	1
Florida	2	–	4	–	2	2	–	6	–	2
Georgia Tech	2	–	4	–	1	2	–	7	–	1
VMI	2	–	4	–	0	3	–	6	–	1
NC State	2	–	4	–	0	3	–	6	–	0
VPI	1	–	4	–	1	3	–	4	–	2
Clemson	1	–	4	–	0	1	–	6	–	2
Ole Miss	1	–	5	–	0	2	–	6	–	1
Virginia	0	–	5	–	1	2	–	6	–	1
Mississippi A&M	0	–	5	–	0	2	–	6	–	0
$ – Conference champion; Rankings from Dickinson System

The 1931 Georgia Bulldogs football team represented the University of Georgia during the 1931 Southern Conference football season. Members of the Southern Conference, the Bulldogs completed the season with an 8–2 record (6–1 SoCon). The two losses were to the Rose Bowl and national champion USC Trojans, and to SoCon champion and the team defeated by USC in the Rose Bowl, the Tulane Green Wave.

== Before the season ==
Georgia's team was led by a group of veterans in end Catfish Smith, fullback Jack "The Ripper" Roberts and captain and quarterback Austin Downes. Buster Mott was a promising sophomore.

== Schedule ==
Date	Opponent	Site	Result	Attendance	Source
October 3	VPI	Sanford Stadium; Athens, GA	W 40–0		
October 10	at Yale*	Yale Bowl; New Haven, CT	W 26–7	70,000	
October 17	at North Carolina	Kenan Memorial Stadium; Chapel Hill, NC	W 32–7	17,000	
October 24	Vanderbilt^{†}	Sanford Stadium; Athens, GA (rivalry)	W 9–0		
October 31	at Florida	Florida Field; Gainesville, FL (rivalry)	W 33–6	20,000	
November 7	at NYU*	Yankee Stadium; Bronx, NY	W 7–6	65,000	
November 14	at Tulane	Sanford Stadium; Athens, GA	L 7–20	35,000	
November 21	vs. Auburn	Memorial Stadium; Columbus, GA (rivalry)	W 12–6		
November 28	Georgia Tech	Sanford Stadium; Athens, GA (rivalry)	W 35–6		
December 12	at USC*	Los Angeles Memorial Coliseum; Los Angeles, CA	L 0–60	75,000	
*Non-conference game; ^{†}Homecoming

== Game summaries ==
=== Yale ===
Georgia at Yale

Team	1	2	3	4	Total
• Georgia	0	13	0	13	26
Yale	0	0	7	0	7

- Date: October 10
- Location: Yale Bowl
  New Haven, Connecticut
- Game attendance: 70,000
- Referee: Halloran (Providence)

For the third straight year, Georgia's Bulldogs triumphed over "superstar" Hall of Famer Albie Booth and Yale's Bulldogs 26–7. Yale once had the ball on its own 45-yard line. "Tommy Taylor dropped back to pass. Catfish Smith hit Taylor as he released the ball and the wobbly toss was grabbed by guard Red Leathers of Georgia, who proceeded to dash 40 yards to the touchdown." Before the first half was over, Homer Key ran for a 74-yard touchdown, starting through right and cutting back. "He was surrounded by blue-clad players. He shuttled in and out like a white needle in haystack of blue, and finally he shout out and streaked for the goal."

In the fourth quarter, after a short punt, Austin Downes connected with Key on a 27-yard touchdown pass. Later, Dickens intercepted Booth's pass at the 29-yard line, and Georgia drove it in with Gilmore finally going over to end the scoring.

The starting lineup was Crenshaw (left end), Townsend (left tackle), Patterson (left guard), Batchelder (center), Maddux (right guard), Cooper (right tackle), Wilson (right end), Downes (quarterback), Chandler (left halfback), Mott (right halfback) White (fullback).

=== Vanderbilt ===
Vernon Smith rushed Tommy Henderson, who always played without a helmet, and made him step out of bounds for a safety. In the third quarter it was still 2-0, and Georgia went for it on fourth down at the 8-yard line. Smith leaped above several Vanderbilt players to catch the touchdown.

=== Florida ===
The Bulldogs beat Charlie Bachman at Florida for the first time 33–6. Both Florida governor Doyle E. Carlton and Georgia governor Richard B. Russell attended the game. Florida scored when Scabby Phiel blocked a punt. Georgia scored in every period.

=== Tulane ===
Tulane at Georgia

Team	1	2	3	4	Total
• Tulane	7	6	7	0	20
Georgia	0	0	7	0	7

- Date: November 14
- Location: Sanford Stadium
  Athens, Georgia

Georgia lost to the eventual SIAA champion Tulane Green Wave 20–7. Tulane scored first on a 33-yard pass from Don Zimmerman to Vernon Haynes. Nollie Felts plunged in from the 1-yard line for the next touchdown. A pass from Georgia's Homey Key to Buster Mott netted 60 yards and a touchdown. After a botched punt, a double pass play led to Payne sprinting around left end for Tulane's final score.

=== USC ===
Georgia was beaten by the national champion USC Trojans 60–0.
