= 1931 Southern Conference football season =

- League: NCAA
- Sport: College football
- Duration: September 19, 1931 through January 1, 1933
- Number of teams: 23

Regular Season
- Season champions: Tulane

Football seasons
- ← 1930 1932 →

1931 Southern Conference football standings
	Conf.					Overall
Team	W		L		T	W		L		T
No. 2 Tulane $	8	–	0	–	0	11	–	1	–	0
No. 3 Tennessee	6	–	0	–	1	9	–	0	–	1
Alabama	7	–	1	–	0	9	–	1	–	0
No. 6 Georgia	6	–	1	–	0	8	–	2	–	0
Maryland	4	–	1	–	1	8	–	1	–	1
Kentucky	4	–	2	–	2	5	–	2	–	2
LSU	3	–	2	–	0	5	–	4	–	0
South Carolina	3	–	3	–	1	5	–	4	–	1
Duke	3	–	3	–	1	5	–	3	–	2
Auburn	3	–	3	–	0	5	–	3	–	0
Sewanee	3	–	3	–	0	6	–	3	–	1
Vanderbilt	3	–	4	–	0	5	–	4	–	0
North Carolina	2	–	3	–	3	4	–	3	–	3
Washington and Lee	2	–	3	–	0	4	–	5	–	1
Florida	2	–	4	–	2	2	–	6	–	2
Georgia Tech	2	–	4	–	1	2	–	7	–	1
VMI	2	–	4	–	0	3	–	6	–	1
NC State	2	–	4	–	0	3	–	6	–	0
VPI	1	–	4	–	1	3	–	4	–	2
Clemson	1	–	4	–	0	1	–	6	–	2
Ole Miss	1	–	5	–	0	2	–	6	–	1
Virginia	0	–	5	–	1	2	–	6	–	1
Mississippi A&M	0	–	5	–	0	2	–	6	–	0
$ – Conference champion; Rankings from Dickinson System

The 1931 Southern Conference football season was the college football games played by the member schools of the Southern Conference as part of the 1931 college football season. The season began on September 19.

In the annual Rose Bowl game, the SoCon champion Tulane Green Wave lost to the PCC champion USC Trojans 21–12. The Georgia Bulldogs suffered their only two losses to Tulane and USC.

It was Wallace Wade's first year as Duke head coach.

== Regular season ==
Index to colors and formatting
Non-conference matchup; SoCon member won
Non-conference matchup; SoCon member lost
Non-conference matchup; tie
Conference matchup

SoCon teams in bold.

=== Week One ===
Date	Visiting team	Home team	Site	Result	Attendance	Reference
September 19	Western Kentucky State Teachers	**Ole Miss**	Hemingway Stadium • Oxford, Mississippi	**W** 13–6		
September 19	Jacksonville State	**Sewanee**	McGee Field • Sewanee, Tennessee	**W** 18–0		
September 19	Roanoke	**Virginia**	Lambeth Field • Charlottesville, Virginia	**W** 18–0		
September 19	Hampden–Sydney	**VMI**	Alumni Field • Lexington, Virginia	**W** 6–0		

=== Week Two ===
Date	Visiting team	Home team	Site	Result	Attendance	Reference
September 25	Birmingham–Southern	**Auburn**	Cramton Bowl • Montgomery, Alabama	**W** 24–6		
September 26	Howard (AL)	**Alabama**	Denny Stadium • Tuscaloosa, Alabama	**W** 42–6	5,000	
September 25	Presbyterian	**Clemson**	Riggs Field • Calhoun, South Carolina	**T** 0–0		
September 26	**LSU**	TCU	Amon G. Carter Stadium • Fort Worth, TX	**L** 3–0		
September 26	Washington College	**Maryland**	Byrd Stadium • College Park, Maryland	**W** 13–0		
September 26	**Mississippi A&M**	Millsaps	Alumni Field • Jackson, Mississippi	**W** 10–7		
September 26	Wake Forest	**North Carolina**	Kenan Memorial Stadium • Chapel Hill, North Carolina	**W** 37–0	10,000	
September 26	Davidson	**NC State**	World War Memorial Stadium • Greensboro, North Carolina	**W** 18–7	7,000	
September 26	Tennessee Tech	**Sewanee**	McGee Field • Sewanee, Tennessee	**W** 24–7		
September 26	**Duke**	**South Carolina**	Melton Field • Columbia, South Carolina	**SCAR** 7–0		
September 26	Maryville (TN)	**Tennessee**	Shields–Watkins Field • Knoxville, Tennessee	**W** 33–0		
September 26	**Ole Miss**	**Tulane**	Tulane Stadium • New Orleans, Louisiana	**TUL** 31–0	12,000	
September 26	Western Kentucky State Teachers	**Vanderbilt**	Dudley Field • Nashville, Tennessee	**W** 52–0		
September 26	Randolph–Macon	**Virginia**	Lambeth Field • Charlottesville, Virginia	**T** 7–7		
September 26	Richmond	**VMI**	Alumni Field • Lexington, Virginia	**L** 7–0		
September 26	King (TN)	**VPI**	Miles Stadium • Blacksburg, Virginia	**W** 33–0		
September 26	Hampden–Sydney	**Washington & Lee**	Stadium Field • Lynchburg, Virginia	**W** 32–0		

=== Week Three ===
Date	Visiting team	Home team	Site	Result	Attendance	Reference
October 3	**Ole Miss**	**Alabama**	Denny Stadium • Tuscaloosa, Alabama	**ALA** 55–6		
October 3	**Clemson**	**Tennessee**	Shields–Watkins Field • Knoxville, TN	**TENN** 44–0		
October 3	**VMI**	**Duke**	Duke Stadium • Durham, North Carolina	**DUKE** 13–0		
October 3	**Florida**	**NC State**	Riddick Stadium • Raleigh, North Carolina	**FLA** 34–0		
October 3	**VPI**	**Georgia**	Sanford Field • Athens, Georgia	**UGA** 40–0		
October 3	**South Carolina**	**Georgia Tech**	Grant Field • Atlanta, Georgia	**GT** 25–13		
October 3	Maryville (TN)	**Kentucky**	McLean Stadium • Lexington, Kentucky	**W** 19–0		
October 3	Spring Hill	**LSU**	Tiger Stadium • Baton Rouge, Louisiana	**W** 35–0		
October 3	**Virginia**	**Maryland**	Byrd Stadium • College Park, Maryland	**MD** 7–6		
October 3	Mississippi College	**Mississippi A&M**	Scott Field • Starkville, Mississippi	**L** 6–2		
October 3	**Sewanee**	Southwestern (TN)	Fargason Field • Memphis, Tennessee	**T** 0–0		
October 3	Texas A&M	**Tulane**	Tulane Stadium • New Orleans, Louisiana	**W** 7–0		
October 3	**North Carolina**	**Vanderbilt**	Dudley Field • Nashville, Tennessee	**VAN** 13–6	7,000	
October 3	Davidson	**Washington & Lee**	Wilson Field • Lexington, Virginia	**L** 7–0		

=== Week Four ===
Date	Visiting team	Home team	Site	Result	Attendance	Reference
October 10	**Alabama**	**Mississippi A&M**	Greer Memorial Field • Meridian, Mississippi	**ALA** 53–0		
October 10	Wisconsin	**Auburn**	Camp Randall Stadium • Madison, WI	**T** 7–7		
October 10	**Clemson**	**NC State**	Central High School Stadium • Charlotte, North Carolina	**CLEM** 6–0		
October 10	Villanova	**Duke**	Duke Stadium • Durham, North Carolina	**W** 18–0		
October 10	**North Carolina**	**Florida**	Florida Field • Gainesville, FL	**T** 0–0	8,000	
October 10	**Georgia**	Yale	Yale Bowl • New Haven, Connecticut	**W** 26–7	70,000	
October 10	Carnegie Tech	**Georgia Tech**	Grant Field • Atlanta, Georgia	**L** 13–0		
October 10	**South Carolina**	**LSU**	Tiger Stadium • Baton Rouge, Louisiana	**LSU** 19–12		
October 10	Navy	**Maryland**	Griffith Stadium • Washington, D. C.	**W** 6–0	16,000	
October 10	**Ole Miss**	**Tennessee**	Shields–Watkins Field • Knoxville, Tennessee	**TENN** 38–0		
October 10	Spring Hill	**Tulane**	Tulane Stadium • New Orleans, Louisiana	**W** 40–0		
October 10	**Vanderbilt**	Ohio State	Ohio Stadium • Columbus, Ohio	**W** 26–21	24,920	
October 10	**Sewanee**	**Virginia**	Lambeth Field • Charlottesville, Virginia	**SEW** 3–0		
October 10	The Citadel	**VMI**	Alumni Field • Lexington, Virginia	**T** 13–13		
October 10	Davidson	**VPI**	Miles Stadium • Blacksburg, Virginia	**W** 18–6		
October 10	**Washington & Lee**	**Kentucky**	McLean Stadium • Lexington, Kentucky	**UK** 45–0	6,500	

=== Week Five ===
Date	Visiting team	Home team	Site	Result	Attendance	Reference
October 16	**Clemson**	The Citadel	Florence Memorial Stadium • Florence, South Carolina	**L** 6–0		
October 16	Wake Forest	**NC State**	Riddick Stadium • Raleigh, North Carolina	**L** 6–0		
October 17	**Alabama**	**Tennessee**	Shields–Watkins Field • Knoxville, Tennessee	**TENN** 25–0	23,000	
October 17	**Auburn**	**Georgia Tech**	Grant Field • Atlanta, Georgia	**AUB** 13–0	17,000	
October 17	Davidson	**Duke**	Richardson Field • Davidson, North Carolina	**T** 0–0	5,000	
October 17	**Florida**	Syracuse	Archbold Stadium • Syracuse, New York	**L** 33–12	14,000	
October 17	**Georgia**	**North Carolina**	Kenan Memorial Stadium • Chapel Hill, North Carolina	**UGA** 32–7	18,000	
October 17	**Mississippi A&M**	**LSU**	Tiger Stadium • Baton Rouge, Louisiana	**LSU** 31–0		
October 17	**Kentucky**	**Maryland**	Byrd Stadium • College Park, Maryland	**T** 6–6	> 10,000	
October 17	**Sewanee**	Chattanooga	Chamberlain Field • Chattanooga, Tennessee	**W** 6–0		
October 17	**Tulane**	**Vanderbilt**	Dudley Field • Nashville, Tennessee	**TUL** 19–0		
October 17	**VMI**	**Virginia**	Scott Stadium • Charlottesville, Virginia	**VMI** 18–3		
October 17	William & Mary	**VPI**	City Stadium • Richmond, Virginia	**T** 6–6		
October 17	**Washington & Lee**	West Virginia	Laidley Field • Charleston, West Virginia	**L** 19–0	12,000	

=== Week Six ===
Date	Visiting team	Home team	Site	Result	Attendance	Reference
October 22	**Clemson**	**South Carolina**	State Fairgrounds • Columbia, South Carolina	**SCAR** 21–0		
October 22	Wake Forest	**Duke**	Duke Stadium • Durham, North Carolina	**W** 28–0		
October 24	**Sewanee**	**Alabama**	Legion Field • Birmingham, Alabama	**ALA** 33–0	5,000	
October 24	**Auburn**	**Florida**	Fairfield Stadium • Jacksonville, Florida	**FLA** 13–12	15,000	
October 24	**Vanderbilt**	**Georgia**	Sanford Stadium • Athens, Georgia	**UGA** 9–0		
October 24	**Georgia Tech**	**Tulane**	Tulane Stadium • New Orleans, Louisiana	**TUL** 33–0	17,000	
October 24	**VPI**	**Kentucky**	McLean Stadium • Lexington, Kentucky	**UK** 20–6	6,000	
October 24	Arkansas	**LSU**	State Fair Stadium • Shreveport, Louisiana	**W** 13–6	9,000	
October 24	**Maryland**	**VMI**	City Stadium • Richmond, Virginia	**MD** 41–20		
October 24	**Ole Miss**	Southwestern (TN)	Fargason Field • Memphis, Tennessee	**T** 20–20		
October 24	**Tennessee**	**North Carolina**	Kenan Memorial Stadium • Chapel Hill, North Carolina	**TENN** 7–0	12,000	
October 24	**Virginia**	**Washington & Lee**	Wilson Field • Lexington, Virginia	**W&L**18–0		

=== Week Seven ===
Date	Visiting team	Home team	Site	Result	Attendance	Reference
October 29	**South Carolina**	The Citadel	County Fairgrounds • Orangeburg, South Carolina	**W** 26–7		
October 30	**Ole Miss**	Marquette	Marquette Stadium • Milwaukee, Wisconsin	**L** 13–6		
October 31	**Kentucky**	**Alabama**	Denny Stadium • Tuscaloosa, Alabama	**ALA** 9–7	10,000	
October 31	Spring Hill	**Auburn**	Drake Field • Auburn, Alabama	**W** 27–7		
October 31	**Duke**	**Tennessee**	Shields–Watkins Field • Knoxville, Tennessee	**TENN** 25–2	12,000	
October 31	**Georgia**	**Florida**	Florida Field • Gainesville, Florida	**UGA** 33–0	20,000	
October 31	**Maryland**	**VPI**	Miles Stadium • Blacksburg, Virginia	**MD** 20–0		
October 31	**North Carolina**	**NC State**	Riddick Stadium • Raleigh, North Carolina	**UNC** 18–15	12,000	
October 31	**Mississippi A&M**	**Tulane**	Tulane Stadium • New Orleans, Louisiana	**TUL** 59–7	4,000	
October 31	**Vanderbilt**	**Georgia Tech**	Grant Field • Atlanta, Georgia	**VAN** 49–7	10,000	
October 31	**VMI**	Davidson	Richardson Field • Davidson, North Carolina	**L** 7–0		
October 31	**Washington & Lee**	William & Mary	Bain Field • Norfolk, Virginia	**T** 0–0		

=== Week Eight ===
Date	Visiting team	Home team	Site	Result	Attendance	Reference
November 6	**VPI**	**Washington & Lee**	Maher Field • Roanoke, Virginia	**W&L** 6–0		
November 7	**Florida**	**Alabama**	Legion Field • Birmingham, Alabama	**ALA** 41–0	7,000	
November 7	**Tulane**	**Auburn**	Cramton Bowl • Montgomery, Alabama	**TUL** 27–0		
November 7	**Clemson**	**VMI**	Bain Field • Norfolk, Virginia	**VMI** 7–6		
November 7	**Georgia**	NYU	Yankee Stadium • Bronx, New York	**W** 7–6	65,000	
November 7	**Duke**	**Kentucky**	McLean Stadium • Lexington, Kentucky	**DUKE** 7–0	12,000	
November 7	**LSU**	Army	Michie Stadium • West Point, NY	**L** 20–0	15,000	
November 7	**Sewanee**	**Ole Miss**	Hemingway Stadium • Oxford, Mississippi	**SEW** 7–0		
November 7	**NC State**	**Mississippi A&M**	Scott Field • Starkville, Mississippi	**NCST** 6–0		
November 7	**North Carolina**	**Georgia Tech**	Grant Field • Atlanta, Georgia	**T** 19–19		
November 7	Furman	**South Carolina**	Melton Field • Columbia, South Carolina	**W** 27–0		
November 7	Carson–Newman	**Tennessee**	Shields–Watkins Field • Knoxville, Tennessee	**W** 31–0		
November 7	**Maryland**	**Vanderbilt**	Dudley Field • Nashville, Tennessee	**VAN** 39–12		
November 7	**Virginia**	Columbia	Baker Field • New York City, New York	**L** 27–0		

=== Week Nine ===
Date	Visiting team	Home team	Site	Result	Attendance	Reference
November 14	**Clemson**	**Alabama**	Cramton Bowl • Montgomery, Alabama	**ALA** 74–7		
November 14	**Sewanee**	**Auburn**	Legion Field • Birmingham, Alabama	**AUB** 12–0		
November 14	**South Carolina**	**Florida**	Plant Field • Tampa, Florida	**T** 6–6		
November 14	**Georgia Tech**	Penn	Franklin Field • Philadelphia, Pennsylvania	**L** 13–12		
November 14	**Kentucky**	**VMI**	Alumni Field • Lexington, Virginia	**UK** 20–12		
November 14	**LSU**	**Ole Miss**	Municipal Stadium • Jackson, Mississippi	**LSU** 26–3		
November 14	Southwestern (TN)	**Mississippi A&M**	Scott Field • Starkville, Mississippi	**W** 14–0		
November 14	Davidson	**North Carolina**	Kenan Memorial Stadium • Chapel Hill, North Carolina	**W** 20–0	7,000	
November 14	**NC State**	**Duke**	Duke Stadium • Durham, North Carolina	**NCST** 14–0	5,000	
November 14	**Tulane**	**Georgia**	Sanford Stadium • Athens, Georgia	**TUL** 20–7	35,000	
November 14	**Vanderbilt**	**Tennessee**	Shields–Watkins Field • Knoxville, Tennessee	**TENN** 21–7	25,000	
November 14	**Virginia**	**VPI**	Scott Stadium • Charlottesville, Virginia	**T** 0–0		
November 14	**Washington & Lee**	Princeton	Palmer Stadium • Princeton, New Jersey	**L** 6–0	13,000	

=== Week Ten ===
Date	Visiting team	Home team	Site	Result	Attendance	Reference
November 21	Auburn	Georgia	Memorial Stadium • Columbus, Georgia	**UGA** 12–6		
November 21	Florida	Georgia Tech	Grant Field • Atlanta, Georgia	**GT** 23–0	10,000	
November 21	North Carolina	Duke	Duke Stadium • Durham, North Carolina	**T** 0–0	22,000	
November 21	Washington & Lee	Maryland	Byrd Stadium • College Park, Maryland	**MD** 13–7		
November 21	NC State	South Carolina	Melton Field • Columbia, South Carolina	**SCAR** 21–0		
November 21	Sewanee	Tulane	Tulane Stadium • New Orleans, Louisiana	**TUL** 40–0	8,000	

=== Week Eleven ===
Date	Visiting team	Home team	Site	Result	Attendance	Reference
November 26	Alabama	**Vanderbilt**	Dudley Field • Nashville, Tennessee	**ALA** 14–6		
November 26	South Carolina	**Auburn**	Cramton Bowl • Montgomery, Alabama	**AUB** 13–6		
November 26	Clemson	Furman	Manly Field • Greenville, South Carolina	**T** 0–0		
November 26	Florida	UCLA	Los Angeles Memorial Coliseum • Los Angeles, California	**L** 13–0	20,000	
November 26	Maryland	Johns Hopkins	Municipal Stadium • Baltimore, Maryland	**W** 35–14	10,000	
November 26	Mississippi A&M	**Ole Miss**	Hemingway Stadium • Oxford, Mississippi	**MISS** 25–14		
November 26	Tennessee	**Kentucky**	McLean Stadium • Lexington, Kentucky	**T** 6–6	18,000	
November 26	Virginia	**North Carolina**	Kenan Memorial Stadium • Chapel Hill, North Carolina	**UNC** 13–6		
November 26	VMI	**VPI**	Maher Field • Roanoke, Virginia	**VPI** 13–6		
November 28	Duke	**Washington & Lee**	Wilson Field • Lexington, Virginia	**DUKE** 6–0	4,000	
November 28	Georgia Tech	**Georgia**	Sanford Stadium • Athens, Georgia	**UGA** 35–6		
November 28	LSU	**Tulane**	Tulane Stadium • New Orleans, Louisiana	**TUL** 34–7	30,000	

=== Week Twelve ===
Date	Visiting team	Home team	Site	Result	Attendance	Reference
December 5	**Alabama**	Chattanooga	Chamberlain Field • Chattanooga, Tennessee	**W** 39–0	3,000	
December 5	Centre	**South Carolina**	Melton Field • Columbia, South Carolina	**L** 9–7		
December 5	**Kentucky**	**Florida**	Fairfield Stadium • Jacksonville, Florida	**UK** 7–2		
December 5	**Maryland**	Western Maryland	Municipal Stadium • Baltimore, Maryland	**W** 41–6	12,000	
December 5	Washington State	**Tulane**	Tulane Stadium • New Orleans, Louisiana	**W** 28–14	20,000	
December 5	**Tennessee**	NYU	Yankee Stadium • Bronx, New York	**W** 13–0	40,684	

=== Week Thirteen ===
Date	Visiting team	Home team	Site	Result	Attendance	Reference
December 12	**Georgia**	USC	Los Angeles Memorial Coliseum • Los Angeles, California	**L** 60–0	75,000	

=== Week Fifteen ===
Date	Visiting team	Home team	Site	Result	Attendance	Reference
December 26	California	**Georgia Tech**	Grant Field • Atlanta, Georgia	**L** 19–6		

== Bowl games ==
Date	Bowl Game	Site	SIAA Team	Opponent	Score
January 1, 1932	Rose Bowl	Rose Bowl • Pasadena, California	Tulane	USC	USC 21–12

== Awards and honors ==
=== All-Americans ===
- E – Jerry Dalrymple, Tulane (AP–1; UP–1; COL–1; CP–1; NEA–1; INS–1; WCFF; LIB; HSM; CH-1; LP; AAB)
- E – Vernon "Catfish" Smith, Georgia (AP-1; COL–1; NEA–2; INS–2; HSM; CP–1; CH-2; LP)
- T – Ray Saunders, Tennessee (CP-3)
- G – Herman Hickman, Tennessee (AP–3; COL–1; NEA–3; INS-3; CP–1; CH-1)
- G – Milton Leathers, Georgia (INS-2)
- C – Pete Gracey, Vanderbilt (CP-2)
- QB – Austin Downes, Georgia (CP-3)
- HB – Don Zimmerman, Tulane (AP–2; NEA–2; INS-1; CP–1; CH-2)
- HB – Gene McEver, Tennessee (AP–2; NEA–2; INS-2; CP–2)
- FB – Johnny Cain, Alabama (UP–1; NEA–3 [picked as halfback]; INS-3; WCFF; CH-2; AAB)
- FB – Nollie Felts, Tulane (CP-3)

=== All-Southern team ===
The following is the composite All-Southern team of coaches and sports writers compiled by the Associated Press.

Position	Name	First-team selectors	Team
QB	Austin Downes	AP, CP	Georgia
HB	Gene McEver	AP, CP	Tennessee
HB	Don Zimmerman	AP, CP	Tulane
FB	Johnny Cain	AP	Alabama
E	Jerry Dalrymple	AP, CP	Tulane
T	Tex Leyendecker	AP, CP	Vanderbilt
G	Herman Hickman	AP, CP	Tennessee
C	Pete Gracey	AP, CP	Vanderbilt
G	John Scafide	AP	Tulane
T	Ray Saunders	AP, CP	Tennessee
E	Vernon "Catfish" Smith	AP, CP	Georgia
