= 1931 Kentucky Wildcats football team =

American college football season

1931 Kentucky Wildcats football
- Conference: Southern Conference
- Record: 5–2–2 (4–2–2 SoCon)
- Head coach: Harry Gamage (5th season)
- Captain: Ralph Wright
- Home stadium: McLean Stadium

1931 Southern Conference football standings
	Conf.					Overall
Team	W		L		T	W		L		T
No. 2 Tulane $	8	–	0	–	0	11	–	1	–	0
No. 3 Tennessee	6	–	0	–	1	9	–	0	–	1
Alabama	7	–	1	–	0	9	–	1	–	0
No. 6 Georgia	6	–	1	–	0	8	–	2	–	0
Maryland	4	–	1	–	1	8	–	1	–	1
Kentucky	4	–	2	–	2	5	–	2	–	2
LSU	3	–	2	–	0	5	–	4	–	0
South Carolina	3	–	3	–	1	5	–	4	–	1
Duke	3	–	3	–	1	5	–	3	–	2
Auburn	3	–	3	–	0	5	–	3	–	0
Sewanee	3	–	3	–	0	6	–	3	–	1
Vanderbilt	3	–	4	–	0	5	–	4	–	0
North Carolina	2	–	3	–	3	4	–	3	–	3
Washington and Lee	2	–	3	–	0	4	–	5	–	1
Florida	2	–	4	–	2	2	–	6	–	2
Georgia Tech	2	–	4	–	1	2	–	7	–	1
VMI	2	–	4	–	0	3	–	6	–	1
NC State	2	–	4	–	0	3	–	6	–	0
VPI	1	–	4	–	1	3	–	4	–	2
Clemson	1	–	4	–	0	1	–	6	–	2
Ole Miss	1	–	5	–	0	2	–	6	–	1
Virginia	0	–	5	–	1	2	–	6	–	1
Mississippi A&M	0	–	5	–	0	2	–	6	–	0
$ – Conference champion; Rankings from Dickinson System

The 1931 Kentucky Wildcats football team was an American football team that represented the University of Kentucky as a member of the Southern Conference (SoCon) during the 1931 college football season. In their fifth season under head coach Harry Gamage, the Wildcats compiled an overall record of 5–2–2 record with a mark of 4–2–2 against conference opponents, finished sixth in the SoCon, and outscored opponents by a total of 130 to 48. The team played its home games at McLean Stadium in Lexington, Kentucky.

== Schedule ==
Date	Opponent	Site	Result	Attendance	Source
October 3	Maryville (TN)*	McLean Stadium; Lexington, KY	W 19–0		
October 10	Washington and Lee	McLean Stadium; Lexington, KY	W 45–0	6,500	
October 17	at Maryland	Byrd Stadium; College Park, MD	T 6–6	10,000	
October 24	VPI	McLean Stadium; Lexington, KY	W 20–6	6,000	
October 31	at Alabama	Denny Stadium; Tuscaloosa, AL	L 7–9	10,000	
November 7	Duke	McLean Stadium; Lexington, KY	L 0–7	12,000	
November 14	at VMI	Alumni Field; Lexington, VA	W 20–12		
November 26	Tennessee	McLean Stadium; Lexington, KY (rivalry)	T 6–6	18,000	
December 5	at Florida	Fairfield Stadium; Jacksonville, FL (rivalry)	W 7–2		
*Non-conference game
