= 1931 Washington and Lee Generals football team =

American college football season

1931 Washington and Lee Generals football
- Conference: Southern Conference
- Record: 4–5–1 (2–3 SoCon)
- Head coach: Jimmy DeHart (5th season)
- Home stadium: Wilson Field

1931 Southern Conference football standings
	Conf.					Overall
Team	W		L		T	W		L		T
No. 2 Tulane $	8	–	0	–	0	11	–	1	–	0
No. 3 Tennessee	6	–	0	–	1	9	–	0	–	1
Alabama	7	–	1	–	0	9	–	1	–	0
No. 6 Georgia	6	–	1	–	0	8	–	2	–	0
Maryland	4	–	1	–	1	8	–	1	–	1
Kentucky	4	–	2	–	2	5	–	2	–	2
LSU	3	–	2	–	0	5	–	4	–	0
South Carolina	3	–	3	–	1	5	–	4	–	1
Duke	3	–	3	–	1	5	–	3	–	2
Auburn	3	–	3	–	0	5	–	3	–	0
Sewanee	3	–	3	–	0	6	–	3	–	1
Vanderbilt	3	–	4	–	0	5	–	4	–	0
North Carolina	2	–	3	–	3	4	–	3	–	3
Washington and Lee	2	–	3	–	0	4	–	5	–	1
Florida	2	–	4	–	2	2	–	6	–	2
Georgia Tech	2	–	4	–	1	2	–	7	–	1
VMI	2	–	4	–	0	3	–	6	–	1
NC State	2	–	4	–	0	3	–	6	–	0
VPI	1	–	4	–	1	3	–	4	–	2
Clemson	1	–	4	–	0	1	–	6	–	2
Ole Miss	1	–	5	–	0	2	–	6	–	1
Virginia	0	–	5	–	1	2	–	6	–	1
Mississippi A&M	0	–	5	–	0	2	–	6	–	0
$ – Conference champion; Rankings from Dickinson System

The 1931 Washington and Lee Generals football team was an American football team that represented Washington and Lee University during the 1931 college football season as a member of the Southern Conference. In their fifth year under head coach Jimmy DeHart, the team compiled an overall record of 4–5–1, with a mark of 2–3 in conference play.

== Schedule ==
Date	Opponent	Site	Result	Attendance	Source
September 26	vs. Hampden–Sydney*	Stadium Field; Lynchburg, VA	W 32–0		
October 3	Davidson*	Wilson Field; Lexington, VA	L 0–7		
October 10	at Kentucky	Stoll Field; Lexington, KY	L 0–45		
October 17	vs. West Virginia*	Laidley Field; Charleston, WV	L 0–19	12,000	
October 24	Virginia	Wilson Field; Lexington, VA	W 18–0		
October 31	vs. William & Mary*	Bain Field; Norfolk, VA	T 0–0		
November 7	vs. VPI	Maher Field; Roanoke, VA	W 6–0		
November 14	at Princeton*	Palmer Stadium; Princeton, NJ	W 6–0	13,000	
November 21	at Maryland	Byrd Stadium; College Park, MD	L 7–13		
November 28	Duke	Wilson Field; Lexington, VA	L 0–6	4,000	
*Non-conference game
