= 1931 Georgia Tech Yellow Jackets football team =

American college football season

1931 Georgia Tech Yellow Jackets football
- Conference: Southern Conference
- Record: 2–7–1 (2–4–1 SoCon)
- Head coach: William Alexander (12th season)
- Captain: H. C. "Monk" Neblett
- Home stadium: Grant Field

1931 Southern Conference football standings
	Conf.					Overall
Team	W		L		T	W		L		T
No. 2 Tulane $	8	–	0	–	0	11	–	1	–	0
No. 3 Tennessee	6	–	0	–	1	9	–	0	–	1
Alabama	7	–	1	–	0	9	–	1	–	0
No. 6 Georgia	6	–	1	–	0	8	–	2	–	0
Maryland	4	–	1	–	1	8	–	1	–	1
Kentucky	4	–	2	–	2	5	–	2	–	2
LSU	3	–	2	–	0	5	–	4	–	0
South Carolina	3	–	3	–	1	5	–	4	–	1
Duke	3	–	3	–	1	5	–	3	–	2
Auburn	3	–	3	–	0	5	–	3	–	0
Sewanee	3	–	3	–	0	6	–	3	–	1
Vanderbilt	3	–	4	–	0	5	–	4	–	0
North Carolina	2	–	3	–	3	4	–	3	–	3
Washington and Lee	2	–	3	–	0	4	–	5	–	1
Florida	2	–	4	–	2	2	–	6	–	2
Georgia Tech	2	–	4	–	1	2	–	7	–	1
VMI	2	–	4	–	0	3	–	6	–	1
NC State	2	–	4	–	0	3	–	6	–	0
VPI	1	–	4	–	1	3	–	4	–	2
Clemson	1	–	4	–	0	1	–	6	–	2
Ole Miss	1	–	5	–	0	2	–	6	–	1
Virginia	0	–	5	–	1	2	–	6	–	1
Mississippi A&M	0	–	5	–	0	2	–	6	–	0
$ – Conference champion; Rankings from Dickinson System

The 1931 Georgia Tech Yellow Jackets football team was an American football team that represented Georgia Tech as a member of the Southern Conference during the 1931 college football season. In their 12th season under head coach Grant Field, Georgia Tech compiled a 2–7–1 record.

== Schedule ==
Date	Opponent	Site	Result	Attendance	Source
October 3	South Carolina	Grant Field; Atlanta, GA	W 25–13		
October 10	Carnegie Tech*	Grant Field; Atlanta, GA	L 0–13		
October 17	Auburn	Grant Field; Atlanta, GA (rivalry)	L 0–13	17,000	
October 24	at Tulane	Tulane Stadium; New Orleans, LA	L 0–33	17,000	
October 31	Vanderbilt	Grant Field; Atlanta, GA (rivalry)	L 7–49	10,000	
November 7	North Carolina	Grant Field; Atlanta, GA	T 19–19		
November 14	at Penn*	Franklin Field; Philadelphia, PA	L 12–13		
November 21	Florida	Grant Field; Atlanta, GA	W 23–0	10,000	
November 28	at Georgia	Sanford Stadium; Athens, GA (rivalry)	L 6–35		
December 26	California*	Grant Field; Atlanta, GA	L 6–19		
*Non-conference game
