= 1931 Clemson Tigers football team =

American college football season

1931 Clemson Tigers football
- Conference: Southern Conference
- Record: 1–6–2 (1–4 SoCon)
- Head coach: Jess Neely (1st season)
- Captain: A. D. Fordham
- Home stadium: Riggs Field

1931 Southern Conference football standings
	Conf.					Overall
Team	W		L		T	W		L		T
No. 2 Tulane $	8	–	0	–	0	11	–	1	–	0
No. 3 Tennessee	6	–	0	–	1	9	–	0	–	1
Alabama	7	–	1	–	0	9	–	1	–	0
No. 6 Georgia	6	–	1	–	0	8	–	2	–	0
Maryland	4	–	1	–	1	8	–	1	–	1
Kentucky	4	–	2	–	2	5	–	2	–	2
LSU	3	–	2	–	0	5	–	4	–	0
South Carolina	3	–	3	–	1	5	–	4	–	1
Duke	3	–	3	–	1	5	–	3	–	2
Auburn	3	–	3	–	0	5	–	3	–	0
Sewanee	3	–	3	–	0	6	–	3	–	1
Vanderbilt	3	–	4	–	0	5	–	4	–	0
North Carolina	2	–	3	–	3	4	–	3	–	3
Washington and Lee	2	–	3	–	0	4	–	5	–	1
Florida	2	–	4	–	2	2	–	6	–	2
Georgia Tech	2	–	4	–	1	2	–	7	–	1
VMI	2	–	4	–	0	3	–	6	–	1
NC State	2	–	4	–	0	3	–	6	–	0
VPI	1	–	4	–	1	3	–	4	–	2
Clemson	1	–	4	–	0	1	–	6	–	2
Ole Miss	1	–	5	–	0	2	–	6	–	1
Virginia	0	–	5	–	1	2	–	6	–	1
Mississippi A&M	0	–	5	–	0	2	–	6	–	0
$ – Conference champion; Rankings from Dickinson System

The 1931 Clemson Tigers football team was an American football team that represented Clemson College in the Southern Conference during the 1931 college football season. In their first season under head coach Jess Neely, the Tigers compiled a 1–6–2 record (1–4 against conference opponents), finished 20th in the conference, and was outscored by a total of 164 to 19. D. Fordham was the team captain.

== Schedule ==
Date	Opponent	Site	Result	Attendance	Source
September 25	Presbyterian*	Riggs Field; Clemson, SC	T 0–0		
October 3	at Tennessee	Shields–Watkins Field; Knoxville, TN	L 0–44		
October 10	vs. NC State	Central High School Stadium; Charlotte, NC (rivalry)	W 6–0	5,000	
October 16	vs. The Citadel*	Florence Memorial Stadium; Florence, SC	L 0–6		
October 22	at South Carolina	State Fair Grounds; Columbia, SC (rivalry)	L 0–21	15,000	
October 31	Oglethorpe*	Riggs Field; Clemson, SC	L 0–12		
November 7	vs. VMI	Bain Field; Norfolk, VA	L 6–7		
November 14	at Alabama	Cramton Bowl; Montgomery, AL (rivalry)	L 7–74		
November 26	at Furman*	Manly Field; Greenville, SC	T 0–0		
*Non-conference game
