= 1931 Maryland Aggies football team =

American college football season

1931 Maryland Aggies football
- Conference: Southern Conference
- Record: 8–1–1 (4–1–1 SoCon)
- Head coach: Curley Byrd (21st season)
- Home stadium: Byrd Stadium (original)

1931 Southern Conference football standings
	Conf.					Overall
Team	W		L		T	W		L		T
No. 2 Tulane $	8	–	0	–	0	11	–	1	–	0
No. 3 Tennessee	6	–	0	–	1	9	–	0	–	1
Alabama	7	–	1	–	0	9	–	1	–	0
No. 6 Georgia	6	–	1	–	0	8	–	2	–	0
Maryland	4	–	1	–	1	8	–	1	–	1
Kentucky	4	–	2	–	2	5	–	2	–	2
LSU	3	–	2	–	0	5	–	4	–	0
South Carolina	3	–	3	–	1	5	–	4	–	1
Duke	3	–	3	–	1	5	–	3	–	2
Auburn	3	–	3	–	0	5	–	3	–	0
Sewanee	3	–	3	–	0	6	–	3	–	1
Vanderbilt	3	–	4	–	0	5	–	4	–	0
North Carolina	2	–	3	–	3	4	–	3	–	3
Washington and Lee	2	–	3	–	0	4	–	5	–	1
Florida	2	–	4	–	2	2	–	6	–	2
Georgia Tech	2	–	4	–	1	2	–	7	–	1
VMI	2	–	4	–	0	3	–	6	–	1
NC State	2	–	4	–	0	3	–	6	–	0
VPI	1	–	4	–	1	3	–	4	–	2
Clemson	1	–	4	–	0	1	–	6	–	2
Ole Miss	1	–	5	–	0	2	–	6	–	1
Virginia	0	–	5	–	1	2	–	6	–	1
Mississippi A&M	0	–	5	–	0	2	–	6	–	0
$ – Conference champion; Rankings from Dickinson System

The 1931 Maryland Aggies football team was an American football team that represented the University of Maryland in the 1931 Southern Conference football season. In their 21st season under head coach Curley Byrd, the Aggies compiled an 8–1–1 record (4–1–1 in conference), finished fifth in the Southern Conference, and outscored their opponents by a total of 194 to 98.

== Schedule ==
Date	Opponent	Site	Result	Attendance	Source
September 26	Washington College*	Byrd Stadium; College Park, MD	W 13–0		
October 3	Virginia	Byrd Stadium; College Park, MD (rivalry)	W 7–6		
October 10	vs. Navy*	Griffith Stadium; Washington, DC (rivalry)	W 6–0	16,000	
October 17	Kentucky	Byrd Stadium; College Park, MD	T 6–6	> 10,000	
October 24	at VMI	City Stadium; Richmond, VA	W 41–20	5,000	
October 31	at VPI	Miles Stadium; Blacksburg, VA	W 21–0		
November 7	at Vanderbilt	Dudley Field; Nashville, TN	L 12–39		
November 21	Washington and Lee^{†}	Byrd Stadium; College Park, MD	W 13–7	5,500	
November 26	at Johns Hopkins*	Baltimore Stadium; Baltimore, MD	W 35–14	10,000	
December 5	vs. Western Maryland*	Baltimore Stadium; Baltimore, MD	W 41–6	12,000	
*Non-conference game; ^{†}Homecoming
