= 1931 Tulane Green Wave football team =

American college football season

1931 Tulane Green Wave football

SoCon champion

Rose Bowl (NCG), L 12–21 vs. USC
- Conference: Southern Conference
- Record: 11–1 (8–0 SoCon)
- Head coach: Bernie Bierman (5th season)
- Offensive scheme: Single wing
- Base defense: 6–3–2
- Captain: Jerry Dalrymple
- Home stadium: Tulane Stadium

1931 Southern Conference football standings
	Conf.					Overall
Team	W		L		T	W		L		T
No. 2 Tulane $	8	–	0	–	0	11	–	1	–	0
No. 3 Tennessee	6	–	0	–	1	9	–	0	–	1
Alabama	7	–	1	–	0	9	–	1	–	0
No. 6 Georgia	6	–	1	–	0	8	–	2	–	0
Maryland	4	–	1	–	1	8	–	1	–	1
Kentucky	4	–	2	–	2	5	–	2	–	2
LSU	3	–	2	–	0	5	–	4	–	0
South Carolina	3	–	3	–	1	5	–	4	–	1
Duke	3	–	3	–	1	5	–	3	–	2
Auburn	3	–	3	–	0	5	–	3	–	0
Sewanee	3	–	3	–	0	6	–	3	–	1
Vanderbilt	3	–	4	–	0	5	–	4	–	0
North Carolina	2	–	3	–	3	4	–	3	–	3
Washington and Lee	2	–	3	–	0	4	–	5	–	1
Florida	2	–	4	–	2	2	–	6	–	2
Georgia Tech	2	–	4	–	1	2	–	7	–	1
VMI	2	–	4	–	0	3	–	6	–	1
NC State	2	–	4	–	0	3	–	6	–	0
VPI	1	–	4	–	1	3	–	4	–	2
Clemson	1	–	4	–	0	1	–	6	–	2
Ole Miss	1	–	5	–	0	2	–	6	–	1
Virginia	0	–	5	–	1	2	–	6	–	1
Mississippi A&M	0	–	5	–	0	2	–	6	–	0
$ – Conference champion; Rankings from Dickinson System

The 1931 Tulane Green Wave football team was an American football team that represented Tulane University as a member of the Southern Conference (SoCon) during the 1931 Southern Conference football season. In its fifth and final season under head coach Bernie Bierman, Tulane compiled an 11–1 record (8–0 in conference games), won the SoCon championship, shut out seven of twelve opponents, and outscored all opponents by a total of 350 to 56. Tulane was undefeated in the regular season, but lost in the Rose Bowl to national champion USC.

End Jerry Dalrymple was the team captain. He was also Tulane's first consensus All-American, receiving unanimous first-team honors from the Associated Press (AP), United Press (UP), Collier's Weekly (Grantland Rice), the Newspaper Enterprise Association (NEA), the International News Service (INS), and the All-American Board, among others.

Halfback Don Zimmerman was selected as a first-team All-American by the INS and won second-team honors from the AP and NEA. He was a triple-threat man known for his skill as a ball-carrier, passer, kicker, blocker, and defensive player. He set a Tulane school record with 1,459 yards of total offense.

In addition, seven Tulane players won All-Southern honors from the AP: Dalrymple, Zimmerman, and guard John Scafide were first team; quarterback Red Dawson, fullback Nollie Felts, end Vernon Haynes, and center Winnie Lodrigues were second team.

In December 1931, Bierman resigned as Tulane's head coach to accept the same position with the University of Minnesota. Bierman compiled a 36–10–2 record in five years at Tulane. He led Minnesota to five national championships in the following 10 years.

The team played its home games at Tulane Stadium in New Orleans.

== Schedule ==
Date	Opponent	Site	Result	Attendance	Source
September 26	Ole Miss	Tulane Stadium; New Orleans, LA (rivalry)	W 31–0	12,000	
October 3	Texas A&M*	Tulane Stadium; New Orleans, LA	W 7–0		
October 10	Spring Hill*	Tulane Stadium; New Orleans, LA	W 40–0		
October 17	at Vanderbilt	Dudley Field; Nashville, TN	W 19–0		
October 24	Georgia Tech	Tulane Stadium; New Orleans, LA	W 33–0	17,000	
October 31	Mississippi A&M	Tulane Stadium; New Orleans, LA	W 59–7	4,000	
November 7	vs. Auburn	Cramton Bowl; Montgomery, AL (rivalry)	W 27–0		
November 14	at Georgia	Sanford Stadium; Athens, GA	W 20–7	35,000	
November 21	Sewanee	Tulane Stadium; New Orleans, LA	W 40–0	8,000	
November 28	LSU	Tulane Stadium; New Orleans, LA (Battle for the Rag)	W 34–7	30,000	
December 5	Washington State*	Tulane Stadium; New Orleans, LA	W 28–14	20,000	
January 1, 1932	vs. USC*	Rose Bowl; Pasadena, CA (Rose Bowl)	L 12–21	84,000	
*Non-conference game; Source:

== Game summaries ==
=== Ole Miss ===
Tulane opened the season with a 31–0 victory over Ole Miss. The starting lineup was DeColigny (left end), Cunningham (left tackle), Calhoun (left guard), Lodrigues (center), Scafide (right guard), Upton (right tackle), Dalrymple (right end), Dawson (quarterback), Glover (left halfback), Zimmerman (right halfback), Felts (fullback).

=== Texas A&M ===
In the second week of play, Tulane defeated Texas A&M 7–0. The starting lineup was DeColigny (left end), Cunningham (left tackle), Calhoun (left guard), Lodrigues (center), Scafide (right guard), Upton (right tackle), Dalrymple (right end), Dawson (quarterback), Glover (left halfback), Zimmerman (right halfback), Felts (fullback).

=== Spring Hill ===
The Spring Hill College Badgers lost to Tulane 40–0 . Tulane played several substitute running backs.

=== Vanderbilt ===
Against Vanderbilt, Tulane won 19–0. Dalrymple though "socked and battered by the Commodore blockers", was the star of the game "with his keen diagnosis of plays" and his defense and punt coverage.

=== Georgia Tech ===
Georgia Tech was beaten 33–0.

=== Mississippi A&M ===
Mississippi A&M was beaten 59–7. The starting lineup was Haynes (left end), Bankston (left tackle), Scafide (left guard), Lodrigues (center), Calhoun (right guard), Upton (right tackle), Dalrymple (right end), Richardson (quarterback), Roberts (left halfback), Hodgins (right halfback), Lemmon (fullback).

=== Auburn ===
Don Zimmerman eclipsed 100 yards rushing in the 27–0 defeat of Auburn. Felts scored three touchdowns.

=== Georgia ===
Tulane at Georgia

Team	1	2	3	4	Total
• Tulane	7	6	7	0	20
Georgia	0	0	7	0	7

- Date: November 14
- Location: Sanford Stadium
  Athens, Georgia

Tulane defeated the Georgia Bulldogs 20–7. Tulane scored first on a 33-yard pass from Zimmerman to Vernon Haynes. Nollie Felts plunged in from the 1-yard line for the next touchdown. A pass from Georgia's Homey Key to Buster Mott netted 60 yards and a touchdown. After a botched punt, a double pass play led to Payne sprinting around left end for Tulane's final score.

=== Sewanee ===
Tulane shut out the Sewanee Tigers 40–0 .

=== LSU ===
Tulane defeated rival LSU 34–7. The starting lineup was Haynes (left end), DeColigny (left tackle), Scafide (left guard), Lodrigues (center), McCormick (right guard), Upton (right tackle), Dalrymple (right end), Dawson (quarterback), Zimmerman (left halfback), Glover (right halfback), Felts (fullback).

=== Washington State ===
Tulane had an intersectional victory to close the regular season, over Washington State 28–14 . Dahlen scored the first touchdown. After starting on the bench, Dalrymple rallied the team when he entered the game. A pass from Zimmerman to Haynes got the first touchdown, with Haynes tackled by Sander at the goal line.

In the second quarter, Zimmerman connected with Dawson for a long pass, pushed out of bounds at the 6-yard line. Glover then got a touchdown on a double lateral pass play, scoring with two tacklers around his neck. After a Zimmerman interception and 30-yard return, another Zimmerman to Haynes pass got another touchdown.

After a blocked punt and then a fumble by Tulane on the next drive, Washington State was in scoring distance, with Schroeder scoring on a line plunge. At the start of the fourth quarter, Dalrymple caught 25-yard touchdown despite being covered.

=== USC—Rose Bowl ===
USC vs. Tulane

Team	1	2	3	4	Total
• USC	0	7	14	0	21
Tulane	0	0	6	6	12

- Date: November 14
- Location: Rose Bowl
  Pasadena, California
- Game attendance: 75,562

Tulane lost in the Rose Bowl to Southern California by a 21–12 score. The Trojans had six All-Americans in their lineup: tackle Ernie Smith, guards Johnny Baker and Aaron "Rosy" Rosenberg, halfback Erny Pinckert and quarterbacks Orville Mohler and Gaius Shaver.

Down 21 to 0 in the third quarter, Zimmerman led a running attack which ended with a 6-yard pass to Haynes for the score. Tulane's other score was a run by "Wop" Glover set up by 11 and 15 yard passes from Zimmerman to Jerry Dalrymple. Tulane still managed a Rose Bowl record for yardage gained.

== Awards and honors ==
One article which attempts to retroactively name Heisman Trophy winners before 1936 named Dalrymple as the recipient for 1931. He was the season's only unanimous All-American; and is still the only unanimous All-American in school history.

Felts was elected captain for 1932.

== Players ==
Jerry Dalrymple, Red Dawson, Vernon Haynes, Claggert Upton

Nollie Felts, Don Zimmerman, Winnie Lodrigues, John Scafide

=== Line ===
Light jersey number	Dark jersey number	Player	Position	Games started	Hometown	Prep school	Height	Weight	Age
41	73	Thomas Cunningham	tackle		Pine Bluff, Arkansas			220	
33	55	Jerry Dalrymple	end		Arkadelphia, Arkansas	Ouachita Junior College	5'10"	178	
35	57	Calvert DeColigny	end		New Orleans			185	
24	40	William Drawe	end		New Orleans			170	
38	70	William Featherngill	tackle		Independence, Kansas			200	
19	62	Vernon Haynes	end		Arkansas City, Arkansas			170	
39	74	Doyless Hill	center		Sand Springs, Oklahoma			200	
30	54	Winnie Lodrigues	center		Patterson			180	
20	46	Doyle Magee	end		Franklinton			175	
34	53	John McCormick	guard		Monroe			171	
23	47	William Penney	guard		Guatemala City, C. A.			180	
36	59	John Read	center		Picayune, Mississippi			195	
42	72	John Scafide	guard		Bay St. Louis, Mississippi	Saint Stanislaus College	6'0"	210	
43	66	Claggert Upton	tackle		New Orleans			206	
31	64	Sam Zemurray	tackle		New Orleans			195	

=== Backfield ===
Light jersey number	Dark jersey number	Player	Position	Games started	Hometown	Prep school	Height	Weight	Age
26	43	Red Dawson	quarterback		River Falls, Wisconsin			165	
37	63	Nollie Felts	fullback		Hattiesburg, Mississippi	Southern Miss		185	
10	38	Wop Glover	halfback		Bay St. Louis, Mississippi	Saint Stanislaus College		165	
12	39	George Haik	halfback		Bogalusa			165	
27	41	James Hodgins	halfback		Shreveport			165	
17	60	Harold Lemmon	fullback		Patterson			186	
29	52	Francis Payne	fullback		Winterville, Mississippi			175	
14	49	Will Pat Richardson	quarterback		Ponchatoula			165	
25	42	Edward Tschirn	halfback		New Orleans			165	
18	44	Don Zimmerman	halfback		Lake Charles		5'11"	176	
