= 1931 Alabama Crimson Tide football team =

American college football season

1931 Alabama Crimson Tide football
- Conference: Southern Conference
- Record: 9–1 (7–1 SoCon)
- Head coach: Frank Thomas (1st season)
- Captain: Joe Sharpe
- Home stadium: Denny Stadium; Legion Field; Cramton Bowl

1931 Southern Conference football standings
	Conf.					Overall
Team	W		L		T	W		L		T
No. 2 Tulane $	8	–	0	–	0	11	–	1	–	0
No. 3 Tennessee	6	–	0	–	1	9	–	0	–	1
Alabama	7	–	1	–	0	9	–	1	–	0
No. 6 Georgia	6	–	1	–	0	8	–	2	–	0
Maryland	4	–	1	–	1	8	–	1	–	1
Kentucky	4	–	2	–	2	5	–	2	–	2
LSU	3	–	2	–	0	5	–	4	–	0
South Carolina	3	–	3	–	1	5	–	4	–	1
Duke	3	–	3	–	1	5	–	3	–	2
Auburn	3	–	3	–	0	5	–	3	–	0
Sewanee	3	–	3	–	0	6	–	3	–	1
Vanderbilt	3	–	4	–	0	5	–	4	–	0
North Carolina	2	–	3	–	3	4	–	3	–	3
Washington and Lee	2	–	3	–	0	4	–	5	–	1
Florida	2	–	4	–	2	2	–	6	–	2
Georgia Tech	2	–	4	–	1	2	–	7	–	1
VMI	2	–	4	–	0	3	–	6	–	1
NC State	2	–	4	–	0	3	–	6	–	0
VPI	1	–	4	–	1	3	–	4	–	2
Clemson	1	–	4	–	0	1	–	6	–	2
Ole Miss	1	–	5	–	0	2	–	6	–	1
Virginia	0	–	5	–	1	2	–	6	–	1
Mississippi A&M	0	–	5	–	0	2	–	6	–	0
$ – Conference champion; Rankings from Dickinson System

The 1931 Alabama Crimson Tide football team (variously "Alabama", "UA" or "Bama") represented the University of Alabama in the 1931 college football season. It was the Crimson Tide's 38th overall and 10th season as a member of the Southern Conference (SoCon). The team was led by head coach Frank Thomas, in his first year, and played their home games at Denny Stadium in Tuscaloosa, at Legion Field in Birmingham and at the Cramton Bowl in Montgomery, Alabama. They finished the season with a record of nine wins and one loss (9–1 overall, 7–1 in the SoCon).

The Crimson Tide won the Southern Conference championship, the 1931 Rose Bowl and a share of the national championship in Wallace Wade's final year at Alabama. The Crimson Tide lost all of the starters from their 10–0 1930 team except for Johnny Cain, but still played almost as well. With Frank Thomas hired as Wade's successor, Alabama won their first three games of the 1931 season against Howard, Ole Miss and Mississippi A&M before they suffered their only loss of the season against Tennessee. The Crimson Tide responded from the loss to win their final five regular season games against Sewanee, Kentucky, Florida, Clemson and Vanderbilt. Alabama then competed in a pair of charity games scheduled in early November to follow the regular season finale against Vanderbilt. In these two games, the Crimson Tide defeated Chattanooga and then three separate Washington, D.C. schools in an exhibition that featured an all-star collection of former Crimson Tide players.

Although Alabama did have considerable success on the field, tragedy did strike the team on November 17 when freshman center James Richard Nichols died from complications due to a spinal injury he suffered during a football practice. His death was the first major accident associated with the Alabama football program in its history.

== Schedule ==
Date	Opponent	Site	Result	Attendance	Source
September 26	Howard (AL)*	Denny Stadium; Tuscaloosa, AL	W 42–6	5,000	
October 3	Ole Miss	Denny Stadium; Tuscaloosa, AL (rivalry)	W 55–6		
October 10	at Mississippi A&M	Greer Memorial Field; Meridian, MS (rivalry)	W 53–0		
October 17	at Tennessee	Shields–Watkins Field; Knoxville, TN (rivalry)	L 0–25	23,000	
October 24	Sewanee	Legion Field; Birmingham, AL	W 33–0	5,000	
October 31	Kentucky^{†}	Denny Stadium; Tuscaloosa, AL	W 9–7	10,000	
November 7	Florida	Legion Field; Birmingham, AL (rivalry)	W 41–0	7,000	
November 14	Clemson	Cramton Bowl; Montgomery, AL (rivalry)	W 74–7		
November 27	at Vanderbilt	Dudley Field; Nashville, TN	W 14–6		
December 5	at Chattanooga*	Chamberlain Field; Chattanooga, TN	W 39–0	3,000	
*Non-conference game; ^{†}Homecoming

== Before the season ==
Prior to the start of the 1930 season, head coach Wallace Wade announced his resignation in order to become the head coach at Duke. On July 26, 1930, former Chattanooga head and then Georgia assistant coach Frank Thomas was announced as Wade's successor by the University Athletic Committee. Signed to a three-year contract, Thomas would take over as head coach on January 1, 1931, with the 1931 season being his first as head coach. In the 1930 season, Alabama finished the season undefeated, with a victory in the 1931 Rose Bowl and as national champions. For the 1931 season, coach Thomas retired Wade's single-wing offense and installed the Notre Dame Box formation that he learned as both a player and assistant coach at Notre Dame under Knute Rockne.

== Game summaries ==
=== Howard (AL) ===
Team	1	2	3	4	Total
Howard	0	0	6	0	6
• Alabama	7	7	14	14	42

- Date: September 26
- Location: Denny Stadium
  Tuscaloosa, Alabama

In what was Frank Thomas' first game as Alabama head coach, Alabama opened the 1931 season with a 42–6 victory over Howard College (now Samford University) at Denny Stadium. The Crimson Tide took a 14–0 lead into halftime after Leon Long scored on touchdown runs of one-yard in the first and five-yards in the second quarter. In the third, Alabama extended their lead to 28–0 when Johnny Cain threw a 59-yard touchdown pass to Hillman Holley, followed by a short Long touchdown run later in the quarter. After Howard scored their only points on a 57-yard touchdown pass late in the third, Alabama closed the game with a pair of fourth-quarter touchdowns. Holley and Larry Hughes each scored on short touchdown runs to make the final score 42–6. Holley starred in the game with his 204 yards rushing and two touchdowns.

=== Ole Miss ===
Team	1	2	3	4	Total
Ole Miss	0	0	6	0	6
• Alabama	20	14	7	14	55

- Date: October 3
- Location: Denny Stadium
  Tuscaloosa, Alabama

In what was Frank Thomas' first SoCon game as Alabama head coach, the Crimson Tide defeated the Ole Miss Rebels 55–6 at Denny Stadium. Alabama took a 20–0 first quarter lead on a trio of touchdowns. Hillman Holley scored first on a 41-yard run, Johnny Cain second on a three-yard run, and Larry Hughes third on a short run. The Crimson Tide further extended their lead to 34–0 at the half after Holley scored on a 47-yard run and Leon Long on a two-yard run. After Cain scored again for Alabama in the third, the Rebels scored their only points of the game when Jack Burke returned a Jennings B. Whitworth kickoff 105 yards for a touchdown. The Crimson Tide then closed the game with touchdown runs from Cain and Long to make the final margin 55–6.

=== Mississippi A&M ===
Team	1	2	3	4	Total
• Alabama	14	20	13	6	53
Mississippi A&M	0	0	0	0	0

- Date: October 10
- Location: Greer Memorial Field
  Meridian, Mississippi

In what was Frank Thomas' first road game as Alabama head coach, the Crimson Tide defeated the Mississippi A&M Aggies (now the Mississippi State Bulldogs) 53–0 at Greer Memorial Field in Meridian. In the game, Alabama only played its starters in the first quarter. Touchdowns were scored twice by Erskine Walker and Ben Smith and once each by Howard Chappell, Hillman Holley, Larry Hughes and Leon Long.

=== Tennessee ===
Third Saturday in October

Team	1	2	3	4	Total
Alabama	0	0	0	0	0
• Tennessee	7	0	6	12	25

- Date: October 17
- Location: Shields–Watkins Field
  Knoxville, Tennessee
- Game attendance: 23,000

Before 23,000 fans at Shields–Watkins Field, Alabama was shutout by the Tennessee Volunteers, 25–0, in Knoxville. The Volunteers took an early 7–0 lead in the first quarter when Gene McEver scored on a short touchdown run. After a scoreless second quarter, McEver scored again on a three-yard touchdown run to extend the Tennessee lead to 13–0. The Volunteers then finished the game with touchdowns on a 17-yard H. B. Brackett run and a six-yard pass from Brackett to McEver to make the final score 25–0.

=== Sewanee ===
Team	1	2	3	4	Total
Sewanee	0	0	0	0	0
• Alabama	13	7	0	13	33

- Date: October 24
- Location: Legion Field
  Birmingham, Alabama
- Game attendance: 5,000

A week after being shut out by Tennessee, Alabama rebounded with a 33–0 shutout against the Sewanee Tigers at Legion Field. Alabama scored their first pair of touchdowns in the first five minutes of the game. The first came when Hillman Holley scored on an eight-yard run and the second when Holley threw a seven-yard pass to Ben Smith to give Alabama a 13–0 lead. Johnny Cain then scored on a short run in the second, and after a scoreless third quarter, the Crimson Tide closed the game with a pair of fourth-quarter touchdowns. Joe Causey scored first on a 28-yard run and then Howard Chappell threw a touchdown pass to Leon Long to make the final score 33–0.

=== Kentucky ===
Team	1	2	3	4	Total
Kentucky	0	0	7	0	7
• Alabama	0	0	7	2	9

- Date: October 31
- Location: Denny Stadium
  Tuscaloosa, Alabama
- Game attendance: 10,000

On homecoming in Tuscaloosa, Alabama defeated the Kentucky Wildcats 9–7 at Denny Stadium. After a scoreless first half dominated by both defenses, Kentucky scored the first points of the game early in the third quarter. The touchdown was scored on the only first down made by the Wildcats on the afternoon when John Kelly scored on a 57-yard run for a 7–0 Kentucky lead. Later in the quarter, Alabama tied the game at 7–7 later in the quarter when Johnny Cain scored on a short touchdown run. The Crimson Tide then took a 9–7 lead early in the fourth quarter when both Thomas Hupke and Jennings B. Whitworth blocked a Ralph Kercheval punt that rolled out of the endzone for a safety. Prior to the safety, a long Cain punt pinned Kentucky deep in its territory and set it up.

=== Florida ===
Team	1	2	3	4	Total
Florida	0	0	0	0	0
• Alabama	0	14	14	13	41

- Date: November 7
- Location: Legion Field
  Birmingham, Alabama
- Game attendance: 7,000

Against the Florida Gators, Alabama posted their third shutout of the season with their 41–0 victory. After a scoreless first quarter, Alabama scored a pair of second-quarter touchdowns on short runs by Johnny Cain and Leon Long to take a 14–0 halftime lead. The Crimson Tide then scored four second half touchdowns on runs by Long and Hillman Holley in the third and on runs by Howard Chappell and Erskine Walker in the fourth to make the final score 41–0.

=== Clemson ===
Team	1	2	3	4	Total
Clemson	7	0	0	0	7
• Alabama	13	20	20	21	74

- Date: November 14
- Location: Cramton Bowl
  Montgomery, Alabama

In their only game played in Montgomery, Alabama defeated the Clemson Tigers 74–7 at the Cramton Bowl. In the game, the Crimson Tide scored eleven touchdowns in the victory. Players who scored were Johnny Cain and Howard Chappell with three; Hillman Holley with two; and Joe Causey, Leon Long and Thomas McMillian each scored one.

=== Vanderbilt ===
Team	1	2	3	4	Total
• Alabama	7	7	0	0	14
Vanderbilt	0	0	6	0	6

- Date: November 26
- Location: Dudley Field
  Nashville, Tennessee

On Thanksgiving Day, Alabama defeated the Vanderbilt Commodores 14–6 at Dudley Field. Alabama scored both of their touchdowns in the first half. Johnny Cain scored first on a short run in the first and Hillman Holley scored on a 16-yard run in the second to give the Crimson Tide a 14–0 halftime lead. The Commodores scored their only points in the third on a Vernon Close run.

== Charity games ==
In early November, university officials announced the football team would participate in a pair of charity games after the scheduled season finale against Vanderbilt. The two games included one against Chattanooga where the 1931 squad would compete, and an all-star exhibition in Washington, D.C. that would feature graduating seniors and former Crimson Tide players. Each of the two games was played as part of a national campaign to raise money for unemployment relief due to the effects of the Great Depression.

=== Chattanooga ===
Team	1	2	3	4	Total
• Alabama	6	12	14	7	39
Chattanooga	0	0	0	0	0

- Date: December 5
- Location: Chamberlain Field
  Chattanooga, Tennessee
- Game attendance: 3,000

In the first of the two scheduled charity games, Alabama defeated the Southern Intercollegiate Athletic Association champion Chattanooga Moccasins 39–0 at Chamberlain Field. Alabama scored its first touchdown on the second play of the game on a 67-yard Howard Chappell run. In the second quarter, touchdowns were scored on a 41-yard Leon Long run and a five-yard Ben Smith run for an 18–0 halftime lead. The Crimson Tide then closed the game with three second half touchdowns: a 53-yard Long run, a Johnny Cain pass to Hillman Holley and on a short Chappell run. Both coach Thomas (from 1925 to 1928) and assistant coach Harold Drew (from 1929 to 1930) had previously served as head coach at Chattanooga. Although this was played as a charity game, Alabama does include the win in its all-time record.

=== Washington charity game ===
After the first charity game against Chattanooga, an all-star team of former Alabama players was assembled to compete in the second charity game to benefit the unemployed. The game was played at Griffith Stadium and featured three separate contests against George Washington, Catholic University and Georgetown. Each of the three games consisted of two, ten-minute halves, and because the Alabama team was playing three separate squads, the Crimson Tide was allowed to make unlimited substitutions.

The players on the Alabama team were primarily from the current and 1930 team that captured the national championship, and were led by coach Thomas and assistant coach Hank Crisp. The players selected included: Dave Boykin, Herschel Caldwell, John Campbell, Joe Causey, C. B. "Foots" Clement, Edgar Dobbs, Jess Eberdt, Albert Elmore, Ellis Hagler, Frank Howard, Allison Hubert, Max Jackson, Leon Long, Ralph McRight, John Miller, Claude Perry, Clyde "Shorty" Propst, Joe Sharpe, Fred Sington, Ben Smith, Earl Smith, John Henry Suther, John Tucker and Jennings B. Whitworth.

With all three played on December 12, Alabama faced George Washington in the first contest. Although the game ended in a 0–0 tie, Alabama had several long plays that included a pair of successive runs by John Campbell for 75 yards and a 55-yard passing play from Allison Hubert to Campbell. The Crimson Tide then defeated Catholic University in the second game 7–0. The only score of the game was set up after Leon Long intercepted a Catholic pass at their own 42-yard line. After five runs for 31 yards by Hubert and one by Herschel Caldwell for three yards, Long scored the game-winning touchdown on a three-yard run. In the final game, Alabama tied Georgetown 0–0 after Long intercepted a Hoyas pass in the endzone on a fourth-and-three play late in the second period.

== Personnel ==
=== Varsity letter winners ===
Player	Hometown	Position
Troy Barker	Lineville, Alabama	Guard
Joe Causey	Douglas, Arizona	Halfback
Johnny Cain	Montgomery, Alabama	Fullback
Howard Chappell	Sylacauga, Alabama	Back
David Cochrane	Tuscaloosa, Alabama	Back
Jim Dildy	Nashville, Arkansas	Tackle
Autrey Dotherow	Brooksville, Alabama	End
Calvin Frey	Arkadelphia, Arkansas	Tackle
Newton Godfree	Alexander City, Alabama	Tackle
Willis Hewes	Russellville, Arkansas	Center
Hillman Holley	Tuscaloosa, Alabama	Back
Ellis "Red" Houston	Bessemer, Alabama	Center
Larry Hughes	Tuscaloosa, Alabama	Back
Thomas Hupke	East Chicago, Indiana	Guard
Max Jackson	Notasulga, Alabama	Tackle
B'Ho Kirkland	Columbia, Alabama	Guard
Carney Laslie	Charlotte, North Carolina	Tackle
Foy Leach	Siloam Springs, Arkansas	End
Leon Long	Haleyville, Alabama	Halfback
Frank Moseley	Montgomery, Alabama	Back
Donald Sanford	Parrish, Alabama	Guard
Joe F. Sharpe	Mobile, Alabama	Center
Williams Comer Sims	Searight, Alabama	Guard
Ben Smith	Haleyville, Alabama	End
M. M. Swaim	Tuscaloosa, Alabama	Guard
John Tucker	Russellville, Arkansas	Quarterback
Erskine Walker	Birmingham, Alabama	Halfback
Jennings B. Whitworth	Blytheville, Arkansas	Tackle

=== Coaching staff ===
Name	Position	Seasons at Alabama	Alma mater
Frank Thomas	Head coach	1	Notre Dame (1923)
Paul Burnum	Assistant coach	2	Alabama (1922)
Hank Crisp	Assistant coach	11	VPI (1920)
Harold Drew	Assistant coach	1	Bates (1916)
Clyde "Shorty" Propst	Assistant coach	7	Alabama (1924)
