= 1931 Vanderbilt Commodores football team =

American college football season

1931 Vanderbilt Commodores football
- Conference: Southern Conference
- Record: 5–4 (3–4 SoCon)
- Head coach: Dan McGugin (27th season)
- Captain: Amos Leonard
- Home stadium: Dudley Field

1931 Southern Conference football standings
	Conf.					Overall
Team	W		L		T	W		L		T
No. 2 Tulane $	8	–	0	–	0	11	–	1	–	0
No. 3 Tennessee	6	–	0	–	1	9	–	0	–	1
Alabama	7	–	1	–	0	9	–	1	–	0
No. 6 Georgia	6	–	1	–	0	8	–	2	–	0
Maryland	4	–	1	–	1	8	–	1	–	1
Kentucky	4	–	2	–	2	5	–	2	–	2
LSU	3	–	2	–	0	5	–	4	–	0
South Carolina	3	–	3	–	1	5	–	4	–	1
Duke	3	–	3	–	1	5	–	3	–	2
Auburn	3	–	3	–	0	5	–	3	–	0
Sewanee	3	–	3	–	0	6	–	3	–	1
Vanderbilt	3	–	4	–	0	5	–	4	–	0
North Carolina	2	–	3	–	3	4	–	3	–	3
Washington and Lee	2	–	3	–	0	4	–	5	–	1
Florida	2	–	4	–	2	2	–	6	–	2
Georgia Tech	2	–	4	–	1	2	–	7	–	1
VMI	2	–	4	–	0	3	–	6	–	1
NC State	2	–	4	–	0	3	–	6	–	0
VPI	1	–	4	–	1	3	–	4	–	2
Clemson	1	–	4	–	0	1	–	6	–	2
Ole Miss	1	–	5	–	0	2	–	6	–	1
Virginia	0	–	5	–	1	2	–	6	–	1
Mississippi A&M	0	–	5	–	0	2	–	6	–	0
$ – Conference champion; Rankings from Dickinson System

The 1931 Vanderbilt Commodores football team was an American football team that represented Vanderbilt University during the 1931 college football season as a member of the Southern Conference. In their 27th year under head coach Dan McGugin, the Commodores compiled an overall record of 5–4, with a mark of 3–4 in conference play.

== Schedule ==
Date	Opponent	Site	Result	Attendance	Source
September 26	Western Kentucky State Teachers*	Dudley Field; Nashville, TN	W 52–0		
October 3	North Carolina	Dudley Field; Nashville, TN	W 13–0	7,000	
October 10	at Ohio State*	Ohio Stadium; Columbus, OH	W 26–21	24,920	
October 17	Tulane	Dudley Field; Nashville, TN	L 0–19		
October 24	at Georgia	Sanford Stadium; Athens, GA (rivalry)	L 0–9		
October 31	at Georgia Tech	Grant Field; Atlanta, GA (rivalry)	W 49–7	10,000	
November 7	Maryland	Dudley Field; Nashville, TN	W 39–12		
November 14	at Tennessee	Shields–Watkins Field; Knoxville, TN (rivalry)	L 7–21	25,000	
November 26	Alabama	Dudley Field; Nashville, TN	L 6–14	14,000	
*Non-conference game
