= 1931 Virginia Cavaliers football team =

American college football season

1931 Virginia Cavaliers football
- Conference: Southern Conference
- Record: 1–7–2 (0–5–1 SoCon)
- Head coach: Fred Dawson (1st season)
- Captain: William Thomas
- Home stadium: Lambeth Field; Scott Stadium

1931 Southern Conference football standings
	Conf.					Overall
Team	W		L		T	W		L		T
No. 2 Tulane $	8	–	0	–	0	11	–	1	–	0
No. 3 Tennessee	6	–	0	–	1	9	–	0	–	1
Alabama	7	–	1	–	0	9	–	1	–	0
No. 6 Georgia	6	–	1	–	0	8	–	2	–	0
Maryland	4	–	1	–	1	8	–	1	–	1
Kentucky	4	–	2	–	2	5	–	2	–	2
LSU	3	–	2	–	0	5	–	4	–	0
South Carolina	3	–	3	–	1	5	–	4	–	1
Duke	3	–	3	–	1	5	–	3	–	2
Auburn	3	–	3	–	0	5	–	3	–	0
Sewanee	3	–	3	–	0	6	–	3	–	1
Vanderbilt	3	–	4	–	0	5	–	4	–	0
North Carolina	2	–	3	–	3	4	–	3	–	3
Washington and Lee	2	–	3	–	0	4	–	5	–	1
Florida	2	–	4	–	2	2	–	6	–	2
Georgia Tech	2	–	4	–	1	2	–	7	–	1
VMI	2	–	4	–	0	3	–	6	–	1
NC State	2	–	4	–	0	3	–	6	–	0
VPI	1	–	4	–	1	3	–	4	–	2
Clemson	1	–	4	–	0	1	–	6	–	2
Ole Miss	1	–	5	–	0	2	–	6	–	1
Virginia	0	–	5	–	1	2	–	6	–	1
Mississippi A&M	0	–	5	–	0	2	–	6	–	0
$ – Conference champion; Rankings from Dickinson System

The 1931 Virginia Cavaliers football team represented the University of Virginia during the 1931 college football season. The Cavaliers were led by first-year head coach Fred Dawson and played their home games at the newly constructed Scott Stadium in Charlottesville, Virginia. They competed as members of the Southern Conference, finishing with a conference record of 0–5–1 and a 1–7–2 record overall.

== Schedule ==
Date	Opponent	Site	Result	Source
September 19	Roanoke*	Lambeth Field; Charlottesville, VA	W 18–0	
September 26	Randolph–Macon*	Lambeth Field; Charlottesville, VA	T 7–7	
October 3	at Maryland	Byrd Stadium; College Park, MD (rivalry)	L 6–7	
October 10	Sewanee	Lambeth Field; Charlottesville, VA	L 0–3	
October 15	VMI^{†}	Scott Stadium; Charlottesville, VA	L 3–18	
October 24	at Washington and Lee	Wilson Field; Lexington, VA	L 0–18	
October 31	at Harvard*	Harvard Stadium; Boston, MA	L 0–19	
November 7	at Columbia*	Baker Field; New York, NY	L 0–27	
November 14	VPI	Scott Stadium; Charlottesville, VA (rivalry)	T 0–0	
November 26	at North Carolina	Kenan Memorial Stadium; Chapel Hill, NC (rivalry)	L 6–13	
*Non-conference game; ^{†}Homecoming
