= 1931 Ole Miss Rebels football team =

American college football season

1931 Ole Miss Rebels football
- Conference: Southern Conference
- Record: 2–6–1 (1–5 SoCon)
- Head coach: Ed Walker (2nd season)
- Home stadium: Hemingway Stadium

1931 Southern Conference football standings
	Conf.					Overall
Team	W		L		T	W		L		T
No. 2 Tulane $	8	–	0	–	0	11	–	1	–	0
No. 3 Tennessee	6	–	0	–	1	9	–	0	–	1
Alabama	7	–	1	–	0	9	–	1	–	0
No. 6 Georgia	6	–	1	–	0	8	–	2	–	0
Maryland	4	–	1	–	1	8	–	1	–	1
Kentucky	4	–	2	–	2	5	–	2	–	2
LSU	3	–	2	–	0	5	–	4	–	0
South Carolina	3	–	3	–	1	5	–	4	–	1
Duke	3	–	3	–	1	5	–	3	–	2
Auburn	3	–	3	–	0	5	–	3	–	0
Sewanee	3	–	3	–	0	6	–	3	–	1
Vanderbilt	3	–	4	–	0	5	–	4	–	0
North Carolina	2	–	3	–	3	4	–	3	–	3
Washington and Lee	2	–	3	–	0	4	–	5	–	1
Florida	2	–	4	–	2	2	–	6	–	2
Georgia Tech	2	–	4	–	1	2	–	7	–	1
VMI	2	–	4	–	0	3	–	6	–	1
NC State	2	–	4	–	0	3	–	6	–	0
VPI	1	–	4	–	1	3	–	4	–	2
Clemson	1	–	4	–	0	1	–	6	–	2
Ole Miss	1	–	5	–	0	2	–	6	–	1
Virginia	0	–	5	–	1	2	–	6	–	1
Mississippi A&M	0	–	5	–	0	2	–	6	–	0
$ – Conference champion; Rankings from Dickinson System

The 1931 Ole Miss Rebels football team was an American football team that represented the University of Mississippi as a member of the Southern Conference during the 1931 college football season. In their second season under head coach Ed Walker, Ole Miss compiled a 2–6–1 record.

== Schedule ==
Date	Opponent	Site	Result	Source
September 19	Western Kentucky State Teachers*	Hemingway Stadium; Oxford, MS	W 13–6	
September 26	at Tulane	Tulane Stadium; New Orleans, LA (rivalry)	L 0–31	
October 3	at Alabama	Denny Stadium; Tuscaloosa, AL (rivalry)	L 6–55	
October 10	at Tennessee	Shields–Watkins Field; Knoxville, TN (rivalry)	L 0–38	
October 24	at Southwestern (TN)*	Fargason Field; Memphis, TN	T 20–20	
October 30	at Marquette*	Marquette Stadium; Milwaukee, WI	L 6–13	
November 7	Sewanee	Hemingway Stadium; Oxford, MS	L 0–7	
November 14	LSU	Municipal Stadium; Jackson, MS (rivalry)	L 3–26	
November 26	Mississippi A&M	Hemingway Stadium; Oxford, MS (Egg Bowl)	W 25–14	
*Non-conference game
