= 1931 NC State Wolfpack football team =

American college football season

1931 NC State Wolfpack football
- Conference: Southern Conference
- Record: 3–6 (2–4 SoCon)
- Head coach: Clipper Smith (1st season)
- Home stadium: Riddick Stadium

1931 Southern Conference football standings
	Conf.					Overall
Team	W		L		T	W		L		T
No. 2 Tulane $	8	–	0	–	0	11	–	1	–	0
No. 3 Tennessee	6	–	0	–	1	9	–	0	–	1
Alabama	7	–	1	–	0	9	–	1	–	0
No. 6 Georgia	6	–	1	–	0	8	–	2	–	0
Maryland	4	–	1	–	1	8	–	1	–	1
Kentucky	4	–	2	–	2	5	–	2	–	2
LSU	3	–	2	–	0	5	–	4	–	0
South Carolina	3	–	3	–	1	5	–	4	–	1
Duke	3	–	3	–	1	5	–	3	–	2
Auburn	3	–	3	–	0	5	–	3	–	0
Sewanee	3	–	3	–	0	6	–	3	–	1
Vanderbilt	3	–	4	–	0	5	–	4	–	0
North Carolina	2	–	3	–	3	4	–	3	–	3
Washington and Lee	2	–	3	–	0	4	–	5	–	1
Florida	2	–	4	–	2	2	–	6	–	2
Georgia Tech	2	–	4	–	1	2	–	7	–	1
VMI	2	–	4	–	0	3	–	6	–	1
NC State	2	–	4	–	0	3	–	6	–	0
VPI	1	–	4	–	1	3	–	4	–	2
Clemson	1	–	4	–	0	1	–	6	–	2
Ole Miss	1	–	5	–	0	2	–	6	–	1
Virginia	0	–	5	–	1	2	–	6	–	1
Mississippi A&M	0	–	5	–	0	2	–	6	–	0
$ – Conference champion; Rankings from Dickinson System

The 1931 North Carolina State Wolfpack football team season was an American football team that represented North Carolina State University as a member of the Southern Conference (SoCon) during the 1931 college football season. In its 1st season under head coach Clipper Smith, the team compiled a 3–6 record (2–4 against SoCon opponents), tied for 17th place in the conference, and was outscored by a total of 104 to 60.

== Schedule ==
Date	Opponent	Site	Result	Attendance	Source
September 26	vs. Davidson*	World War Memorial Stadium; Greensboro, NC	W 18–7	7,000	
October 3	Florida	Riddick Stadium; Raleigh, NC	L 0–34		
October 10	vs. Clemson	Central High School Stadium; Charlotte, NC (rivalry)	L 0–6	5,000	
October 16	Wake Forest*	Riddick Stadium; Raleigh, NC (rivalry)	L 0–6		
October 23	Catholic University*	Riddick Stadium; Raleigh, NC	L 7–12		
October 31	North Carolina	Riddick Stadium; Raleigh, NC (rivalry)	L 15–18	12,000	
November 7	at Mississippi A&M	Scott Field; Starkville, MS	W 6–0		
November 14	at Duke	Duke Stadium; Durham, NC (rivalry)	W 14–0	5,000	
November 21	at South Carolina	Melton Field; Columbia, SC	L 0–21		
*Non-conference game
