= 1931 North Carolina Tar Heels football team =

American college football season

1931 North Carolina Tar Heels football
- Conference: Southern Conference
- Record: 4–3–3 (2–3–3 SoCon)
- Head coach: Chuck Collins (6th season)
- Home stadium: Kenan Memorial Stadium

1931 Southern Conference football standings
	Conf.					Overall
Team	W		L		T	W		L		T
No. 2 Tulane $	8	–	0	–	0	11	–	1	–	0
No. 3 Tennessee	6	–	0	–	1	9	–	0	–	1
Alabama	7	–	1	–	0	9	–	1	–	0
No. 6 Georgia	6	–	1	–	0	8	–	2	–	0
Maryland	4	–	1	–	1	8	–	1	–	1
Kentucky	4	–	2	–	2	5	–	2	–	2
LSU	3	–	2	–	0	5	–	4	–	0
South Carolina	3	–	3	–	1	5	–	4	–	1
Duke	3	–	3	–	1	5	–	3	–	2
Auburn	3	–	3	–	0	5	–	3	–	0
Sewanee	3	–	3	–	0	6	–	3	–	1
Vanderbilt	3	–	4	–	0	5	–	4	–	0
North Carolina	2	–	3	–	3	4	–	3	–	3
Washington and Lee	2	–	3	–	0	4	–	5	–	1
Florida	2	–	4	–	2	2	–	6	–	2
Georgia Tech	2	–	4	–	1	2	–	7	–	1
VMI	2	–	4	–	0	3	–	6	–	1
NC State	2	–	4	–	0	3	–	6	–	0
VPI	1	–	4	–	1	3	–	4	–	2
Clemson	1	–	4	–	0	1	–	6	–	2
Ole Miss	1	–	5	–	0	2	–	6	–	1
Virginia	0	–	5	–	1	2	–	6	–	1
Mississippi A&M	0	–	5	–	0	2	–	6	–	0
$ – Conference champion; Rankings from Dickinson System

The 1931 North Carolina Tar Heels football team was an American football team that represented the University of North Carolina during the 1931 college football season as a member of the Southern Conference. In their sixth year under head coach Chuck Collins, the team compiled an overall record of 4–3–3, with a mark of 2–3–3 in conference play.

== Schedule ==
Date	Time	Opponent	Site	Result	Attendance	Source
September 26	2:30 p.m.	Wake Forest*	Kenan Memorial Stadium; Chapel Hill, NC (rivalry)	W 37–0	10,000	
October 3	3:30 p.m.	at Vanderbilt	New Dudley Field; Nashville, TN	L 0–13	15,000	
October 10	3:00 p.m.	at Florida	Florida Field; Gainesville, FL	T 0–0	8,000	
October 17	2:30 p.m.	Georgia	Kenan Memorial Stadium; Chapel Hill, NC	L 7–32	18,000	
October 24	2:30 p.m.	Tennessee	Kenan Memorial Stadium; Chapel Hill, NC	L 0–7	14,000	
October 31	2:30 p.m.	at NC State	Riddick Field; Raleigh, NC (rivalry)	W 18–15	10,000	
November 7	3:00 p.m.	at Georgia Tech	Grant Field; Atlanta, GA	T 19–19		
November 14	2:30 p.m.	Davidson*	Kenan Memorial Stadium; Chapel Hill, NC	W 20–0	7,000	
November 21	2:00 p.m.	at Duke	Duke Stadium; Durham, NC (rivalry)	T 0–0	22,000	
November 26	2:00 p.m.	Virginia	Kenan Memorial Stadium; Chapel Hill, NC (rivalry)	W 13–6		
*Non-conference game; All times are in Eastern time
