= 1931 Duke Blue Devils football team =

American college football season

1931 Duke Blue Devils football
- Conference: Southern Conference
- Record: 5–3–2 (3–3–1 SoCon)
- Head coach: Wallace Wade (1st season)
- Offensive scheme: Single-wing
- Captain: Kidd Brewer
- Home stadium: Duke Stadium

1931 Southern Conference football standings
| | Conf. | | | | | Overall |
| Team | W | | L | | T | W | | L | | T |
|---|---|---|---|---|---|---|---|---|---|---|
| No. 2 Tulane $ | 8 | – | 0 | – | 0 | 11 | – | 1 | – | 0 |
| No. 3 Tennessee | 6 | – | 0 | – | 1 | 9 | – | 0 | – | 1 |
| Alabama | 7 | – | 1 | – | 0 | 9 | – | 1 | – | 0 |
| No. 6 Georgia | 6 | – | 1 | – | 0 | 8 | – | 2 | – | 0 |
| Maryland | 4 | – | 1 | – | 1 | 8 | – | 1 | – | 1 |
| Kentucky | 4 | – | 2 | – | 2 | 5 | – | 2 | – | 2 |
| LSU | 3 | – | 2 | – | 0 | 5 | – | 4 | – | 0 |
| South Carolina | 3 | – | 3 | – | 1 | 5 | – | 4 | – | 1 |
| Duke | 3 | – | 3 | – | 1 | 5 | – | 3 | – | 2 |
| Auburn | 3 | – | 3 | – | 0 | 5 | – | 3 | – | 0 |
| Sewanee | 3 | – | 3 | – | 0 | 6 | – | 3 | – | 1 |
| Vanderbilt | 3 | – | 4 | – | 0 | 5 | – | 4 | – | 0 |
| North Carolina | 2 | – | 3 | – | 3 | 4 | – | 3 | – | 3 |
| Washington and Lee | 2 | – | 3 | – | 0 | 4 | – | 5 | – | 1 |
| Florida | 2 | – | 4 | – | 2 | 2 | – | 6 | – | 2 |
| Georgia Tech | 2 | – | 4 | – | 1 | 2 | – | 7 | – | 1 |
| VMI | 2 | – | 4 | – | 0 | 3 | – | 6 | – | 1 |
| NC State | 2 | – | 4 | – | 0 | 3 | – | 6 | – | 0 |
| VPI | 1 | – | 4 | – | 1 | 3 | – | 4 | – | 2 |
| Clemson | 1 | – | 4 | – | 0 | 1 | – | 6 | – | 2 |
| Ole Miss | 1 | – | 5 | – | 0 | 2 | – | 6 | – | 1 |
| Virginia | 0 | – | 5 | – | 1 | 2 | – | 6 | – | 1 |
| Mississippi A&M | 0 | – | 5 | – | 0 | 2 | – | 6 | – | 0 |
$ – Conference champion; Rankings from Dickinson System

The 1931 Duke Blue Devils football team was an American football team that represented Duke University during the 1931 Southern Conference football season. In its first season under head coach Wallace Wade, the team compiled a 5–3–2 record (3–3–1 against conference opponents), shut out seven opponents, and outscored all opponents by a total of 74 to 46. Kidd Brewer was the team captain. The team played its home games at Duke Stadium in Durham, North Carolina.

== Schedule ==
| Date | Opponent | Site | Result | Attendance | Source |
|---|---|---|---|---|---|
| September 26 | at South Carolina | Melton Field; Columbia, SC | L 0–7 | | |
| October 3 | VMI^{†} | Duke Stadium; Durham, NC | W 13–0 | | |
| October 10 | Villanova* | Duke Stadium; Durham, NC | W 18–0 | | |
| October 17 | at Davidson* | Richardson Stadium; Davidson, NC | T 0–0 | 5,000 | |
| October 23 | Wake Forest* | Duke Stadium; Durham, NC (rivalry) | W 28–0 | | |
| October 31 | at Tennessee | Shields–Watkins Field; Knoxville, TN | L 2–25 | 12,000 | |
| November 7 | at Kentucky | Stoll Field; Lexington, KY | W 7–0 | 12,000 | |
| November 14 | NC State | Duke Stadium; Durham, NC (rivalry) | L 0–14 | 5,000 | |
| November 21 | North Carolina | Duke Stadium; Durham, NC (rivalry) | T 0–0 | 22,000 | |
| November 28 | at Washington and Lee | Wilson Field; Lexington, VA | W 6–0 | 4,000 | |
*Non-conference game; ^{†}Homecoming
