= 1931 Florida Gators football team =

American college football season

1931 Florida Gators football
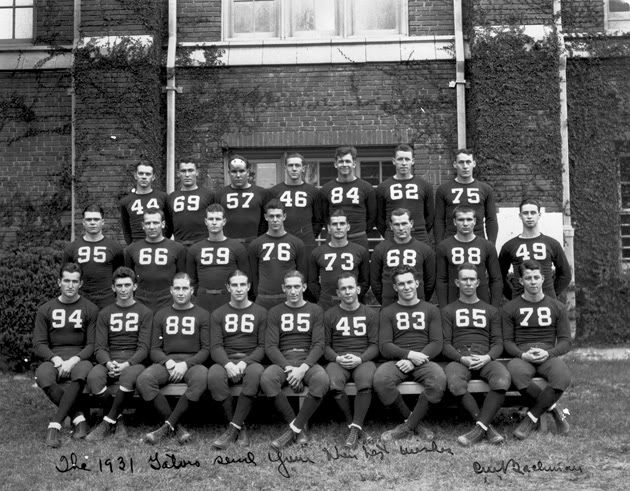
- Conference: Southern Conference
- Record: 2–6–2 (2–4–2 SoCon)
- Head coach: Charlie Bachman (4th season)
- Offensive scheme: Notre Dame Box
- Captain: Ed N. Parnell
- Home stadium: Florida Field

Uniform
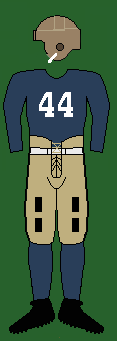

1931 Southern Conference football standings
| | Conf. | | | | | Overall |
| Team | W | | L | | T | W | | L | | T |
|---|---|---|---|---|---|---|---|---|---|---|
| No. 2 Tulane $ | 8 | – | 0 | – | 0 | 11 | – | 1 | – | 0 |
| No. 3 Tennessee | 6 | – | 0 | – | 1 | 9 | – | 0 | – | 1 |
| Alabama | 7 | – | 1 | – | 0 | 9 | – | 1 | – | 0 |
| No. 6 Georgia | 6 | – | 1 | – | 0 | 8 | – | 2 | – | 0 |
| Maryland | 4 | – | 1 | – | 1 | 8 | – | 1 | – | 1 |
| Kentucky | 4 | – | 2 | – | 2 | 5 | – | 2 | – | 2 |
| LSU | 3 | – | 2 | – | 0 | 5 | – | 4 | – | 0 |
| South Carolina | 3 | – | 3 | – | 1 | 5 | – | 4 | – | 1 |
| Duke | 3 | – | 3 | – | 1 | 5 | – | 3 | – | 2 |
| Auburn | 3 | – | 3 | – | 0 | 5 | – | 3 | – | 0 |
| Sewanee | 3 | – | 3 | – | 0 | 6 | – | 3 | – | 1 |
| Vanderbilt | 3 | – | 4 | – | 0 | 5 | – | 4 | – | 0 |
| North Carolina | 2 | – | 3 | – | 3 | 4 | – | 3 | – | 3 |
| Washington and Lee | 2 | – | 3 | – | 0 | 4 | – | 5 | – | 1 |
| Florida | 2 | – | 4 | – | 2 | 2 | – | 6 | – | 2 |
| Georgia Tech | 2 | – | 4 | – | 1 | 2 | – | 7 | – | 1 |
| VMI | 2 | – | 4 | – | 0 | 3 | – | 6 | – | 1 |
| NC State | 2 | – | 4 | – | 0 | 3 | – | 6 | – | 0 |
| VPI | 1 | – | 4 | – | 1 | 3 | – | 4 | – | 2 |
| Clemson | 1 | – | 4 | – | 0 | 1 | – | 6 | – | 2 |
| Ole Miss | 1 | – | 5 | – | 0 | 2 | – | 6 | – | 1 |
| Virginia | 0 | – | 5 | – | 1 | 2 | – | 6 | – | 1 |
| Mississippi A&M | 0 | – | 5 | – | 0 | 2 | – | 6 | – | 0 |
$ – Conference champion; Rankings from Dickinson System

The 1931 Florida Gators football team represented the University of Florida as a member of the Southern Conference (SoCon) during the 1931 college football season. The season was the fourth of Charlie Bachman as the head coach of the Florida Gators football team. Bachman's 1931 Florida Gators finished with an overall record of 2–6–2 and a Southern Conference record of 2–4–2, placing fifteenth of twenty-three teams in the conference standings—Bachman's second worst conference record in five seasons.

The season's highlights included the Gators' only victories over the NC State (31–0) in Raleigh, North Carolina and the Auburn Tigers (13–12) in Jacksonville, Florida, both of which were fellow SoCon members. Tom McEwen relays "The handwriting was on the wall during that dismal 1931 season. The Gators lost five of their last six games, tying the other. During that streak the Florida offense – three years earlier the best in the country—managed only two touchdowns and a safety."

== Before the season ==
Captain-elect Monk Dorsett did not return. The next captain-elect Carlos Proctor was expelled. The team's captain was then end Ed Parnell.

The Gators lost both Ben Clemons and Frank Clark from the previous season.New player "Scabby" Pheil joined the team.Florida's schedule included games against several established opponents.

== Schedule ==
| Date | Opponent | Site | Result | Attendance | Source |
|---|---|---|---|---|---|
| October 3 | at NC State | Riddick Stadium; Raleigh, NC | W 31–0 | | |
| October 10 | North Carolina | Florida Field; Gainesville, FL | T 0–0 | 8,000 | |
| October 17 | at Syracuse* | Archbold Stadium; Syracuse, NY | L 12–33 | 14,000 | |
| October 24 | vs. Auburn | Fairfield Stadium; Jacksonville, FL (rivalry) | W 13–12 | 15,000 | |
| October 31 | Georgia | Florida Field; Gainesville, FL (rivalry) | L 6–33 | 20,000 | |
| November 7 | at Alabama | Legion Field; Birmingham, AL (rivalry) | L 0–41 | 7,000 | |
| November 14 | vs. South Carolina | Plant Field; Tampa, FL | T 6–6 | | |
| November 21 | at Georgia Tech | Grant Field; Atlanta, GA | L 0–23 | 10,000 | |
| November 28 | at UCLA* | Los Angeles Memorial Coliseum; Los Angeles, CA | L 0–13 | 20,000 | |
| December 5 | vs. Kentucky | Fairfield Stadium; Jacksonville, FL (rivalry) | L 2–7 | | |
*Non-conference game

Primary source: 2015 Florida Gators Football Media Guide.

== Game summaries ==
=== NC State ===
The season opened with a 31–0 win over the NC State Wolfpack in Raleigh. The team surprised coach Bachman.

=== North Carolina ===
| Team | 1 | 2 | 3 | 4 | Total |
|---|---|---|---|---|---|
| UNC | 0 | 0 | 0 | 0 | 0 |
| Florida | 0 | 0 | 0 | 0 | 0 |

- Date: October 10
- Location: Florida Field
  Gainesville, Florida
- Game attendance: 8,000

In the second week of play, the Gators played the North Carolina Tar Heels to a scoreless tie. The Tar Heels were twice at the 1-yard line.

=== Syracuse ===
Florida traveled to Syracuse and lost 33–12.

=== Auburn ===
| Team | 1 | 2 | 3 | 4 | Total |
|---|---|---|---|---|---|
| Auburn | 0 | 6 | 0 | 6 | 12 |
| • Florida | 6 | 0 | 0 | 7 | 13 |

- Date: October 24
- Location: Fairfield Stadium
  Jacksonville, Florida
- Game attendance: 15,000

The season's lone highlight after opening week, Florida defeated Auburn by a point, 13–12. Jimmy Hitchcock missed the tying extra point.

=== Georgia ===
The rival Georgia Bulldogs beat coach Bachman for the first time, 33–6. Both Florida governor Doyle E. Carlton and Georgia governor Richard B. Russell attended the game. Florida scored when Scabby Phiel blocked a punt.

=== Alabama ===
| Team | 1 | 2 | 3 | 4 | Total |
|---|---|---|---|---|---|
| Florida | 0 | 0 | 0 | 0 | 0 |
| • Alabama | 0 | 14 | 14 | 13 | 41 |

- Date: November 7
- Location: Legion Field
  Birmingham, Alabama
- Game attendance: 7,000

Alabama and new head coach Frank Thomas shut out the Gators with a 41–0 victory. After a scoreless first quarter, Alabama scored a pair of second-quarter touchdowns on short runs by Johnny Cain and Leon Long to take a 14–0 halftime lead. The Crimson Tide then scored four second half touchdowns on runs by Long and Hillman Holley in the third and on runs by Howard Chappell and Erskine Walker in the fourth to make the final score 41–0.

=== South Carolina ===
| Team | 1 | 2 | 3 | 4 | Total |
|---|---|---|---|---|---|
| S. Carolina | 0 | 0 | 0 | 6 | 6 |
| Florida | 0 | 6 | 0 | 0 | 6 |

- Date: November 14
- Location: Plant Field
  Tampa, Florida
- Referee: Darwin (Virginia)

In Tampa, the South Carolina Gamecocks were tied, 6–6.

The starting lineup was Williamson (left end), McClellan (left tackle), Bernhart (left guard), Spiers (Center), Osgood (right guard), Simpson (right tackle), Goodyear (right end), Culler (quarterback), Davis (left halfback), Emmelhainz (right halfback), Silsby (fullback).

=== Georgia Tech ===
| Team | 1 | 2 | 3 | 4 | Total |
|---|---|---|---|---|---|
| Florida | 0 | 0 | 0 | 0 | 0 |
| • Ga. Tech | 2 | 0 | 14 | 7 | 23 |

- Date: November 14
- Location: Grant Field
  Atlanta

Coach Bill Alexander's Georgia Tech Yellow Jackets beat Florida 23–0. The second half opened with an 86-yard kickoff return by Pat Barron, and a subsequent goal line stand.

The starting lineup was Parnell (left end), Phiel (left tackle), Bernhard (left guard), Perrazzi (Center), Osgood (right guard), Jenkins (right tackle), Ball (right end), Culler (quarterback), Davis (left halfback), McClellan (right halfback), Silsby (fullback).

=== UCLA ===
The Gators traveled to Los Angeles and lost to the UCLA Bruins 13–0. The Gators stopped in Albuquerque, New Mexico on the way back.

=== Kentucky ===
A frustrating season ended with a 7–2 loss to Kentucky.

== Postseason ==
The Gators traveled 6,586 miles. Former Gator end Dutch Stanley was hired to coach the ends next season.

== Bibliography ==
- McEwen, Tom (1974). The Gators: A Story of Florida Football. Huntsville, Alabama: The Strode Publishers. ISBN 0-87397-025-X.
