= 1931 LSU Tigers football team =

American college football season

1931 LSU Tigers football
- Conference: Southern Conference
- Record: 5–4 (3–2h SoCon)
- Head coach: Russ Cohen (4th season)
- Captain: Ed Khoury
- Home stadium: Tiger Stadium

1931 Southern Conference football standings
	Conf.					Overall
Team	W		L		T	W		L		T
No. 2 Tulane $	8	–	0	–	0	11	–	1	–	0
No. 3 Tennessee	6	–	0	–	1	9	–	0	–	1
Alabama	7	–	1	–	0	9	–	1	–	0
No. 6 Georgia	6	–	1	–	0	8	–	2	–	0
Maryland	4	–	1	–	1	8	–	1	–	1
Kentucky	4	–	2	–	2	5	–	2	–	2
LSU	3	–	2	–	0	5	–	4	–	0
South Carolina	3	–	3	–	1	5	–	4	–	1
Duke	3	–	3	–	1	5	–	3	–	2
Auburn	3	–	3	–	0	5	–	3	–	0
Sewanee	3	–	3	–	0	6	–	3	–	1
Vanderbilt	3	–	4	–	0	5	–	4	–	0
North Carolina	2	–	3	–	3	4	–	3	–	3
Washington and Lee	2	–	3	–	0	4	–	5	–	1
Florida	2	–	4	–	2	2	–	6	–	2
Georgia Tech	2	–	4	–	1	2	–	7	–	1
VMI	2	–	4	–	0	3	–	6	–	1
NC State	2	–	4	–	0	3	–	6	–	0
VPI	1	–	4	–	1	3	–	4	–	2
Clemson	1	–	4	–	0	1	–	6	–	2
Ole Miss	1	–	5	–	0	2	–	6	–	1
Virginia	0	–	5	–	1	2	–	6	–	1
Mississippi A&M	0	–	5	–	0	2	–	6	–	0
$ – Conference champion; Rankings from Dickinson System

The 1931 LSU Tigers football team was an American football team that represented Louisiana State University (LSU) during the 1931 college football season as a member of the Southern Conference. In their fourth year under head coach Russ Cohen, the Tigers compiled an overall record of 5–4, with a mark of 3–2 in conference play. The 35–0 victory over Spring Hill was the first night-game in Tiger Stadium.

== Schedule ==
Date	Opponent	Site	Result	Attendance	Source
September 26	at TCU*	Amon G. Carter Stadium; Fort Worth, TX	L 0–3		
October 4	Spring Hill*	Tiger Stadium; Baton Rouge, LA	W 35–0		
October 10	South Carolina^{†}	Tiger Stadium; Baton Rouge, LA	W 19–12		
October 17	Mississippi A&M	Tiger Stadium; Baton Rouge, LA (rivalry)	W 31–0		
October 24	vs. Arkansas*	State Fair Stadium; Shreveport, LA (rivalry)	W 13–6	9,000	
October 31	Sewanee	Tiger Stadium; Baton Rouge, LA	L 6–12		
November 7	at Army*	Michie Stadium; West Point, NY	L 0–20	15,000	
November 14	at Ole Miss	Municipal Stadium; Jackson, MS (rivalry)	W 26–3		
November 28	at Tulane	Tulane Stadium; New Orleans, LA (Battle for the Rag)	L 7–34	30,000	
*Non-conference game; ^{†}Homecoming
