= 1931 VMI Keydets football team =

American college football season

1931 VMI Keydets football
- Conference: Southern Conference
- Record: 3–6–1 (2–4 SoCon)
- Head coach: W. C. Raftery (5th season)
- Home stadium: Alumni Field

1931 Southern Conference football standings
	Conf.					Overall
Team	W		L		T	W		L		T
No. 2 Tulane $	8	–	0	–	0	11	–	1	–	0
No. 3 Tennessee	6	–	0	–	1	9	–	0	–	1
Alabama	7	–	1	–	0	9	–	1	–	0
No. 6 Georgia	6	–	1	–	0	8	–	2	–	0
Maryland	4	–	1	–	1	8	–	1	–	1
Kentucky	4	–	2	–	2	5	–	2	–	2
LSU	3	–	2	–	0	5	–	4	–	0
South Carolina	3	–	3	–	1	5	–	4	–	1
Duke	3	–	3	–	1	5	–	3	–	2
Auburn	3	–	3	–	0	5	–	3	–	0
Sewanee	3	–	3	–	0	6	–	3	–	1
Vanderbilt	3	–	4	–	0	5	–	4	–	0
North Carolina	2	–	3	–	3	4	–	3	–	3
Washington and Lee	2	–	3	–	0	4	–	5	–	1
Florida	2	–	4	–	2	2	–	6	–	2
Georgia Tech	2	–	4	–	1	2	–	7	–	1
VMI	2	–	4	–	0	3	–	6	–	1
NC State	2	–	4	–	0	3	–	6	–	0
VPI	1	–	4	–	1	3	–	4	–	2
Clemson	1	–	4	–	0	1	–	6	–	2
Ole Miss	1	–	5	–	0	2	–	6	–	1
Virginia	0	–	5	–	1	2	–	6	–	1
Mississippi A&M	0	–	5	–	0	2	–	6	–	0
$ – Conference champion; Rankings from Dickinson System

The 1931 VMI Keydets football team was an American football team that represented the Virginia Military Institute (VMI) during the 1931 college football season as a member of the Southern Conference. In their fifth year under head coach W. C. Raftery, the team compiled an overall record of 3–6–1.

== Schedule ==
Date	Opponent	Site	Result	Attendance	Source
September 19	Hampden–Sydney*	Alumni Field; Lexington, VA	W 6–0		
September 26	Richmond*	Alumni Field; Lexington, VA (rivalry)	L 0–7	2,000	
October 3	at Duke	Duke Stadium; Durham, NC	L 0–13		
October 10	The Citadel*	Alumni Field; Lexington, VA (rivalry)	T 13–13		
October 15	at Virginia	Scott Stadium; Charlottesville, VA	W 18–3		
October 24	vs. Maryland	City Stadium; Richmond, VA	L 20–41		
October 31	at Davidson*	Richardson Field; Davidson, NC	L 0–7		
November 7	vs. Clemson	Bain Field; Norfolk, VA	W 7–6		
November 14	Kentucky	Alumni Field; Lexington, VA	L 12–20		
November 26	vs. VPI	Maher Field; Roanoke, VA (rivalry)	L 6–13		
*Non-conference game
