= Nollie Felts =

American football player (1905–1974)

No. 37, 63
- Positions: End, Fullback

Personal information
- Born: February 7, 1905; Hattiesburg, Mississippi, U.S.
- Died: November 1, 1974 (aged 69); Hattiesburg, Mississippi, U.S.
- Listed weight: 185 lb (84 kg)

Career information
- College: Southern Miss (1922–1926); Tulane (1930–1932)

Awards and highlights
- 2× SoCon champion (1930, 1931); All-Southern (1931); Third-team All-American (1931); Southern Miss Athletics Hall of Fame; Tulane Athletic Hall of Fame

Nollie C. "Papa" Felts (February 7, 1905 – November 1, 1974) was an American college football player for the Southern Miss Golden Eagles of the University of Southern Mississippi and the Tulane Green Wave of Tulane University. Felts is a member of both schools' athletics hall of fame.

== Southern Miss ==
He was captain of the 1923 Southern Miss team and is still considered one of the best football players in school history.

== Tulane ==
Felts then attended Tulane University. He studied medicine.

=== 1931 ===
The 1931 team, ranked #2 by the Dickinson Rating System, featured Felts as a fullback in the backfield with Don Zimmerman. He weighed 180 pounds. Felts was selected as a third-team All-American in 1931 on the "Captain's Poll" of the Central Press Association. Felts scored three touchdowns in the 27–0 victory over Auburn. He scored in the 20–7 victory over Georgia, the school's first ever loss at Sanford Stadium. Felts scored in every game of the season through the Sewanee game, leading the SoCon with 81 points at that moment.

=== 1932 ===
Felts was captain-elect of the 1932 team. Previously in 1927, Felts played baseball with the Hattiesburg Pinetoppers of the Cotton States League, which resulted in his ineligibility ruled by the Southern Conference for the 1932 college football season. The Greenies lost "their great leader" Felts shortly before opening week against Texas A&M.
