= Orville Neal =

American football coach (1902–??)

Biographical details
- Born: January 31, 1902; Craig, Nebraska, U.S.
- Education: Western Maryland College

Playing career
- c. 1927: Western Maryland

Coaching career (HC unless noted)
- 1929: Western Maryland (Asst.)
- 1930–1931: VPI

Head coaching record
- Overall: 8–7–3

Orville Ellsworth Neal was an American football coach. He served as the head football coach at Virginia Agricultural and Mechanical College and Polytechnic Institute (VPI)—now Virginia Tech—from 1930 to 1931, compiling a record of 8–7–3.

== Early life ==
Neal was born in Craig, Nebraska.

== Playing career ==
After graduating from high school, Neal attended and played college football at York College. He then joined the United States Marine Corps, where he played on the football team for the Quantico Marine Base. After playing football for Quantico for four years, Neal attended Penn State University and was on the freshman football team. He then left Penn State to play football at Western Maryland College (now McDaniel College).

In 1985, Neal was inducted into the McDaniel College Hall of Fame.

== Coaching career ==
After graduating, Neal became assistant coach at Western Maryland for one year. He then became the head football coach at Virginia Agricultural and Mechanical College and Polytechnic Institute (VPI)—now Virginia Tech—from 1930 to 1931.

=== Head coaching record ===
| Year | Team | Overall | Conference | Standing | Bowl/playoffs |
|---|---|---|---|---|---|
VPI Gobblers (Southern Conference) (1930–1931)
| 1930 | VPI | 5–3–1 | 2–3–1 | 13th | |
| 1931 | VPI | 3–4–2 | 1–4–1 | 19th | |
| VPI: | | 8–7–3 | 5–7–2 | | |
| Total: | | 8–7–3 | | | |

== Personal life ==
While head coach at VPI, Neal married a student named Elsa Gudheim in 1931. They divorced in 1935.
