= Winnie Lodrigues =

American football player (1911–1986)

Biographical details
- Born: January 18, 1911; Patterson, Louisiana, U.S.
- Died: June 27, 1986 (aged 75)

Playing career

Football
- 1930–1932: Tulane
- Position: Center

Coaching career (HC unless noted)

Football
- 1933: New Orleans Academy (LA)
- 1943: Bates

Accomplishments and honors

Awards
- Second-team All-Southern (1931)

Winnie Paul Lodrigues (January 18, 1911 – June 27, 1986) was an American football player and coach. He played college football as a center for the Tulane Green Wave from 1930 to 1932. He was a member of the 1931 Tulane Green Wave football team that played in the 1932 Rose Bowl. Lodrigues served as a head football coach at Bates College in 1943.

== Early life ==
Lodrigues was born in Patterson, Louisiana on January 18, 1911 to Joseph Anthony and Mary (Bernard) Lodrigues. He was one of seven sons, three of which played football at Tulane.

== College career ==
In 1931, Lodrigues replaced Loyd "Preacher" Roberts as starting center for Tulane's football team. That year, the Green Wave went undefeated in the regular season and lost to the USC Trojans in the 1932 Rose Bowl. Lodrigues was a second team selection on the Associated Press' 1931 College Football All-Southern Team. He was a member of the Southern team in the 1932 North–South Game. He was also the first baseman for the Tulane Green Wave baseball team and spent one season on the school's tennis team.

== After college ==
After graduating, Lodrigues coached at the New Orleans Academy. He then worked as an executive in charge of Boy Scouts of America camps. In 1942, he joined the United States Navy as a chief specialist. In 1943, he was assigned to Bates College's V-12 Navy College Training Program and coached the school's football team that fall. Later that year, he was promoted to lieutenant and transferred out of Bates. He saw active duty in the European, Pacific, and American theaters of World War II.

In 1952, Lodrigues moved to Garyville, Louisiana, where he worked as an elementary school principal. He died on June 27, 1986. He was survived by his wife, Joy, and their son, Winnie Jr.
