= 1931 South Carolina Gamecocks football team =

American college football season

1931 South Carolina Gamecocks football
- Conference: Southern Conference
- Record: 5–4–1 (3–3–1 SoCon)
- Head coach: Billy Laval (4th season)
- Captain: Miles Blount
- Home stadium: Melton Field

1931 Southern Conference football standings
	Conf.					Overall
Team	W		L		T	W		L		T
No. 2 Tulane $	8	–	0	–	0	11	–	1	–	0
No. 3 Tennessee	6	–	0	–	1	9	–	0	–	1
Alabama	7	–	1	–	0	9	–	1	–	0
No. 6 Georgia	6	–	1	–	0	8	–	2	–	0
Maryland	4	–	1	–	1	8	–	1	–	1
Kentucky	4	–	2	–	2	5	–	2	–	2
LSU	3	–	2	–	0	5	–	4	–	0
South Carolina	3	–	3	–	1	5	–	4	–	1
Duke	3	–	3	–	1	5	–	3	–	2
Auburn	3	–	3	–	0	5	–	3	–	0
Sewanee	3	–	3	–	0	6	–	3	–	1
Vanderbilt	3	–	4	–	0	5	–	4	–	0
North Carolina	2	–	3	–	3	4	–	3	–	3
Washington and Lee	2	–	3	–	0	4	–	5	–	1
Florida	2	–	4	–	2	2	–	6	–	2
Georgia Tech	2	–	4	–	1	2	–	7	–	1
VMI	2	–	4	–	0	3	–	6	–	1
NC State	2	–	4	–	0	3	–	6	–	0
VPI	1	–	4	–	1	3	–	4	–	2
Clemson	1	–	4	–	0	1	–	6	–	2
Ole Miss	1	–	5	–	0	2	–	6	–	1
Virginia	0	–	5	–	1	2	–	6	–	1
Mississippi A&M	0	–	5	–	0	2	–	6	–	0
$ – Conference champion; Rankings from Dickinson System

The 1931 South Carolina Gamecocks football team was an American football team that represented the University of South Carolina as a member of the Southern Conference (SoCon) during the 1931 college football season. Led by fourth-year head coach Billy Laval, the Gamecocks compiled an overall record of 5–4–1 with a mark of 3–3–1 in conference play, tying for eighth place in the SoCon.

== Schedule ==
Date	Opponent	Site	Result	Source
September 26	Duke	State Fairgrounds; Columbia, SC	W 7–0	
October 3	at Georgia Tech	Grant Field; Atlanta, GA	L 13–25	
October 10	at LSU	Tiger Stadium; Baton Rouge, LA	L 12–19	
October 22	Clemson	State Fairgrounds; Columbia, SC (rivalry)	W 21–0	
October 29	vs. The Citadel*	County Fairgrounds; Orangeburg, SC	W 26–7	
November 7	Furman*	Melton Field; Columbia, SC	W 27–0	
November 14	Florida	Plant Field; Tampa, FL	T 6–6	
November 21	NC State	Melton Field; Columbia, SC	W 21–0	
November 26	at Auburn	Cramton Bowl; Montgomery, AL	L 6–13	
December 5	Centre*	Melton Field; Columbia, SC	L 7–9	
*Non-conference game
