= 1931 Tennessee Volunteers football team =

American college football season

1931 Tennessee Volunteers football
- Conference: Southern Conference
- Record: 9–0–1 (6–0–1 SoCon)
- Head coach: Robert Neyland (6th season)
- Offensive scheme: Single-wing
- Captain: Eugene S. Mayer
- Home stadium: Shields–Watkins Field

1931 Southern Conference football standings
| | Conf. | | | | | Overall |
| Team | W | | L | | T | W | | L | | T |
|---|---|---|---|---|---|---|---|---|---|---|
| No. 2 Tulane $ | 8 | – | 0 | – | 0 | 11 | – | 1 | – | 0 |
| No. 3 Tennessee | 6 | – | 0 | – | 1 | 9 | – | 0 | – | 1 |
| Alabama | 7 | – | 1 | – | 0 | 9 | – | 1 | – | 0 |
| No. 6 Georgia | 6 | – | 1 | – | 0 | 8 | – | 2 | – | 0 |
| Maryland | 4 | – | 1 | – | 1 | 8 | – | 1 | – | 1 |
| Kentucky | 4 | – | 2 | – | 2 | 5 | – | 2 | – | 2 |
| LSU | 3 | – | 2 | – | 0 | 5 | – | 4 | – | 0 |
| South Carolina | 3 | – | 3 | – | 1 | 5 | – | 4 | – | 1 |
| Duke | 3 | – | 3 | – | 1 | 5 | – | 3 | – | 2 |
| Auburn | 3 | – | 3 | – | 0 | 5 | – | 3 | – | 0 |
| Sewanee | 3 | – | 3 | – | 0 | 6 | – | 3 | – | 1 |
| Vanderbilt | 3 | – | 4 | – | 0 | 5 | – | 4 | – | 0 |
| North Carolina | 2 | – | 3 | – | 3 | 4 | – | 3 | – | 3 |
| Washington and Lee | 2 | – | 3 | – | 0 | 4 | – | 5 | – | 1 |
| Florida | 2 | – | 4 | – | 2 | 2 | – | 6 | – | 2 |
| Georgia Tech | 2 | – | 4 | – | 1 | 2 | – | 7 | – | 1 |
| VMI | 2 | – | 4 | – | 0 | 3 | – | 6 | – | 1 |
| NC State | 2 | – | 4 | – | 0 | 3 | – | 6 | – | 0 |
| VPI | 1 | – | 4 | – | 1 | 3 | – | 4 | – | 2 |
| Clemson | 1 | – | 4 | – | 0 | 1 | – | 6 | – | 2 |
| Ole Miss | 1 | – | 5 | – | 0 | 2 | – | 6 | – | 1 |
| Virginia | 0 | – | 5 | – | 1 | 2 | – | 6 | – | 1 |
| Mississippi A&M | 0 | – | 5 | – | 0 | 2 | – | 6 | – | 0 |
$ – Conference champion; Rankings from Dickinson System

The 1931 Tennessee Volunteers football team (variously "Tennessee", "UT" or the "Vols") represented the University of Tennessee in the 1931 Southern Conference football season. Playing as a member of the Southern Conference (SoCon), the team was led by head coach Robert Neyland, in his sixth year, and played their home games at Shields–Watkins Field in Knoxville, Tennessee. The 1931 Vols won nine, lost zero and tied one game (9–0–1 overall, 6–0–1 in the SoCon). On October 17, Tennessee avenged their only loss from the previous season and beat Alabama; this was the only loss for the Crimson Tide in 1931. For the third time in four years, Kentucky spoiled Tennessee's bid for a perfect season with a tie. Tennessee concluded the 1931 season on December 7 with a charity game at Yankee Stadium against NYU. The 1931 Vols outscored their opponents 243 to 15 and posted eight shutouts.

== Schedule ==
| Date | Opponent | Site | Result | Attendance | Source |
|---|---|---|---|---|---|
| September 26 | Maryville (TN)* | Shields–Watkins Field; Knoxville, TN | W 33–0 | | |
| October 3 | Clemson | Shields–Watkins Field; Knoxville, TN | W 44–0 | | |
| October 10 | Ole Miss | Shields–Watkins Field; Knoxville, TN (rivalry) | W 38–0 | | |
| October 17 | Alabama^{†} | Shields–Watkins Field; Knoxville, TN (rivalry) | W 25–0 | 23,000 | |
| October 24 | at North Carolina | Kenan Memorial Stadium; Chapel Hill, NC | W 7–0 | 12,000 | |
| October 31 | Duke | Shields–Watkins Field; Knoxville, TN | W 25–2 | 12,000 | |
| November 7 | Carson–Newman* | Shields–Watkins Field; Knoxville, TN | W 31–0 | | |
| November 14 | Vanderbilt | Shields–Watkins Field; Knoxville, TN (rivalry) | W 21–7 | 25,000 | |
| November 26 | at Kentucky | McLean Stadium; Lexington, KY (rivalry) | T 6–6 | 18,000 | |
| December 5 | at NYU* | Yankee Stadium; Bronx, NY | W 13–0 | 40,684 | |
*Non-conference game; ^{†}Homecoming

== Players ==
=== Line ===
| Number | Player | Position | Games started | Hometown | Prep school | Height | Weight | Age |
|---|---|---|---|---|---|---|---|---|
| 62 | Malcolm Aitken | tackle | | | | | | |
| 58 | Bert Bibee | center | | | | | | |
| 51 | Thomas Bounds | tackle | | | | | | |
| 31 | Fritz Brandt | end | | | | | | |
| 33 | James Clemmer | end | | | | | | |
| 61 | Oscar Derryberry | end | | | | | | |
| 60 | James Eldridge | tackle | | | | | | |
| 21 | J. B. Ellis | guard | | | | | | |
| 30 | Milton Frank | guard | | | | | | |
| 37 | John Franklin | guard | | | | | | |
| 57 | G. B. Goodrich | guard | | | | | | |
| 45 | Herman Hickman | guard | | | | | | |
| 25 | Laird Holt | end | | | | | | |
| 26 | Paul Hug | end | | | | | | |
| 34 | Alton Mark | end | | | | | | |
| 46 | Talmadge Maples | center | | | | | | |
| 20 | Eugene S. Mayer | center | | | | | | |
| 35 | C. L. McPherson | end | | | | | | |
| 47 | David K. Mitchell | center | | | | | | |
| 39 | Virgil Rayburn | end | | | | | | |
| 44 | Ben Redman | guard | | | | | | |
| 42 | Ray Saunders | tackle | | | | | | |
| 55 | Francis Shull | end | | | | | | |
| 66 | B. Smith | end | | | | | | |
| 23 | Gordon Smith | guard | | | | | | |
| 64 | Howard Stewart | guard | | | | | | |
| 22 | J. Ralph Still | tackle | | | | | | |
| 17 | Herman Snipes | end | | | | | | |
| 56 | A. H. Voss | guard | | | | | | |
| 26 | Murray Warmath | end | | | | | | |

=== Backfield ===
| Number | Player | Position | Games started | Hometown | Prep school | Height | Weight | Age |
|---|---|---|---|---|---|---|---|---|
| 41 | John Allen | halfback | | | | | | |
| 32 | Malcolm Anderson | fullback | | | | | | |
| 15 | John D. Bayless | halfback | | | | | | |
| 43 | Deke Brackett | quarterback | | | | | | |
| 40 | William G. Cox | fullback | | | | | | |
| 16 | Theodore Disney | halfback | | | | | | |
| 48 | Beattie Feathers | halfback | | | | | | |
| 18 | Charles Kohlhase | quarterback | | | | | | |
| 53 | James McAuliffe | halfback | | | | | | |
| 36 | Ira McCollister | halfback | | | | | | |
| 52 | Gene McEver | halfback | | | | | | |
| 38 | Leo Petruzze | quarterback | | | | | | |
| 63 | Herman Wynn | fullback | | | | | | |
