= Vernon Haynes =

American football and basketball player and coach

- Haynes pictured in Jambalaya 1943, Tulane yearbook

Biographical details
- Born: December 17, 1910; Arkansas City, Arkansas, U.S.
- Died: May 29, 1973 (aged 62); Metarie, Louisiana, U.S.

Playing career

Football
- 1929–1931: Tulane

Basketball
- 1929–1932: Tulane
- Position: End (football)

Coaching career (HC unless noted)

Football
- 1932: Alcee Fortier HS (LA) (assistant)
- 1933–1934: Warren Easton HS (LA)
- 1935–1939: Ouachita Parish HS (LA)
- 1940: Louisiana College
- 1941–1945: Tulane (ends)
- 1949–1950: Apprentice

Basketball
- 1932–1933: Alcee Fortier HS (LA)
- 1942–1945: Tulane

Head coaching record
- Overall: 28–26 (college basketball)

Accomplishments and honors

Awards
- Football; All-Southern (1931)

Vernon Carlton "Lefty" Haynes (December 17, 1910 – May 28, 1973) was an American football and basketball player and coach. He served as the head football coach at Louisiana College in 1940 and at The Apprentice School in Newport News, Virginia from 1949 to 1950. Haynes was also the head basketball coach at Tulane University from 1942 to 1945. He played college football at Tulane University, where he was a member of the 1931 Tulane Green Wave football team, which played in the 1932 Rose Bowl.

== Coaching career ==
Haynes was the 12th head football coach at The Apprentice School in Newport News, Virginia and he held that position for two seasons, from 1949 until 1950. His coaching record at Apprentice was 8–8.
