= 1931 Auburn Tigers football team =

American college football season

1931 Auburn Tigers football
- Conference: Southern Conference
- Record: 5–3–1 (3–3 SoCon)
- Head coach: Chet A. Wynne (2nd season)
- Captains: Chattie Davidson; J. D. Bush
- Home stadium: Drake Field; Legion Field; Cramton Bowl

1931 Southern Conference football standings
	Conf.					Overall
Team	W		L		T	W		L		T
No. 2 Tulane $	8	–	0	–	0	11	–	1	–	0
No. 3 Tennessee	6	–	0	–	1	9	–	0	–	1
Alabama	7	–	1	–	0	9	–	1	–	0
No. 6 Georgia	6	–	1	–	0	8	–	2	–	0
Maryland	4	–	1	–	1	8	–	1	–	1
Kentucky	4	–	2	–	2	5	–	2	–	2
LSU	3	–	2	–	0	5	–	4	–	0
South Carolina	3	–	3	–	1	5	–	4	–	1
Duke	3	–	3	–	1	5	–	3	–	2
Auburn	3	–	3	–	0	5	–	3	–	0
Sewanee	3	–	3	–	0	6	–	3	–	1
Vanderbilt	3	–	4	–	0	5	–	4	–	0
North Carolina	2	–	3	–	3	4	–	3	–	3
Washington and Lee	2	–	3	–	0	4	–	5	–	1
Florida	2	–	4	–	2	2	–	6	–	2
Georgia Tech	2	–	4	–	1	2	–	7	–	1
VMI	2	–	4	–	0	3	–	6	–	1
NC State	2	–	4	–	0	3	–	6	–	0
VPI	1	–	4	–	1	3	–	4	–	2
Clemson	1	–	4	–	0	1	–	6	–	2
Ole Miss	1	–	5	–	0	2	–	6	–	1
Virginia	0	–	5	–	1	2	–	6	–	1
Mississippi A&M	0	–	5	–	0	2	–	6	–	0
$ – Conference champion; Rankings from Dickinson System

The 1931 Auburn Tigers football team represented Auburn University in the 1931 Southern Conference football season. Led by second-year head coach Chet A. Wynne, the team went 5–3–1, which was the team's first winning season since 1925.

1931 was the first and only time Auburn has played the University of Wisconsin during the regular season, though they have since played twice in bowl games.

== Schedule ==
Date	Opponent	Site	Result	Attendance	Source
September 25	Birmingham–Southern*	Cramton Bowl; Montgomery, AL	W 24–6		
October 10	at Wisconsin*	Camp Randall Stadium; Madison, WI	T 7–7		
October 17	at Georgia Tech	Grant Field; Atlanta, GA (rivalry)	W 13–0	17,000	
October 24	vs. Florida	Fairfield Stadium; Jacksonville, FL (rivalry)	L 12–13	15,000	
October 31	Spring Hill*^{†}	Drake Field; Auburn, AL	W 27–7		
November 7	Tulane	Cramton Bowl; Montgomery, AL (rivalry)	L 0–27		
November 14	Sewanee	Legion Field; Birmingham, AL	W 12–0		
November 21	vs. Georgia	Memorial Stadium; Columbus, GA (rivalry)	L 6–12		
November 26	South Carolina	Cramton Bowl; Montgomery, AL	W 13–6		
*Non-conference game; ^{†}Homecoming
