= Austin Downes =

American football player (1905–1979)

No. 1, 20, 41
- Position: Quarterback

Personal information
- Born: August 20, 1905; Chicago, Illinois, U.S.
- Died: May 25, 1979 (aged 73); Phoenix, Arizona, U.S.
- Listed height: 5 ft 8 in (1.73 m)
- Listed weight: 156 lb (71 kg)

Career information
- College: Notre Dame (1926–1927); Georgia (1929–1931)

Awards and highlights
- Second-team All-American (1931); All-Southern (1930, 1931)

Austin J. Downes (August 20, 1905 – May 25, 1979) was a college football player. He later worked for the US government in Phoenix, Arizona.

== Early life ==
Downes came from an Irish family in Chicago. Downes was to play for Knute Rockne's Notre Dame Fighting Irish football team, but transferred to the University of Georgia under Rockne's protege coach Harry Mehre.

== University of Georgia ==
Downes was a prominent quarterback for the Georgia Bulldogs of the University of Georgia from 1929 to 1931. He was twice All-Southern. He led the team in 1930 to wins over Eastern powers NYU and Yale. The Georgia tradition of rubbing the head of Harry "Squab" Jones to some degree starts with Downes, who refused to rub it. After finally doing so, Downes returned the opening kickoff in the Yale Bowl 70+ yards for a touchdown, catching it off a bounce on the grass. The 1931 team of which he was captain suffered just two losses, one to national champion USC, and the other to the team USC beat in the Rose Bowl, Southern champion Tulane.
