= Dick Richards (American football) =

American football player (1907–1996)

Profile
- Position: Fullback

Personal information
- Born: November 17, 1907; Pueblo, Colorado
- Died: November 13, 1996 (aged 88); Riverside, California
- Listed height: 6 ft 0 in (1.83 m)
- Listed weight: 194 lb (88 kg)

Career information
- College: Kentucky

Career history
- Brooklyn Dodgers (1933)

Richard Orville Richards (November 17, 1907 – November 13, 1996) was an American football player. He played college football at Kentucky and professional football in the National Football League (NFL) as a fullback and wingback for the Brooklyn Dodgers. He appeared in nine NFL games, four as a starter, during the 1933 season.
