= Buster Mott =

American football player (1909–1987)

No. 19, 13
- Position: Back

Personal information
- Born: June 21, 1909; Atlanta, Georgia, US
- Died: November 14, 1987 (aged 78); East Point, Georgia, US
- Listed height: 5 ft 8 in (1.73 m)
- Listed weight: 193 lb (88 kg)

Career information
- College: Georgia

Career history
- Green Bay Packers (1933); Cincinnati Reds (1934); Pittsburgh Pirates (1934)

Career statistics
- Receptions: 1
- Receiving yards: 12
- Rushing attempts: 5
- Rushing yards: 37
- Stats at Pro Football Reference

Norman Howard "Buster" Mott (June 21, 1909 – November 14, 1987) was an American football back in the National Football League (NFL). Mott played with the Green Bay Packers during the 1933 NFL season. He split the following season between the Cincinnati Reds and the Pittsburgh Pirates.
