= Ralph Wright (American football) =

American football player (1908–1976)

No. 31
- Position: Tackle

Personal information
- Born: January 16, 1908; Sturgis, Kentucky
- Died: August 3, 1976 (aged 68); Broward County, Florida
- Listed height: 6 ft 0 in (1.83 m)
- Listed weight: 230 lb (104 kg)

Career information
- College: Kentucky

Career history
- Brooklyn Dodgers (1933)

Ralph B. "Babe" Wright (January 16, 1908 – August 3, 1976) was an American football player. He played college football at Kentucky from 1929 to 1931. He was captain of the 1931 Kentucky team and was selected as the best tackle of the year by a committee of 10 southern sports editors. He later played professionally in the National Football League (NFL) as a tackle for the Brooklyn Dodgers in 1933. He appeared in six NFL games during the 1933 season.
