= Jack Roberts (American football) =

American football player (1910–1981)

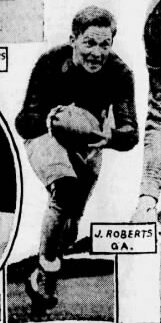

Profile
- Position: Running back

Personal information
- Born: September 27, 1910; Pine Log, Georgia, U.S.
- Died: October 1981 (age 71)
- Listed height: 6 ft 0 in (1.83 m)
- Listed weight: 210 lb (95 kg)

Career information
- College: Georgia

Career history
- 1932: Boston Braves
- 1932: Staten Island Stapletons
- 1933–1934: Philadelphia Eagles
- 1934: Pittsburgh Pirates

Awards and highlights
- Third-team All-American (1930)

Jack "The Ripper" Roberts (September 27, 1910 – October 1981) was an American football running back in the National Football League (NFL) for the Boston Braves, the Staten Island Stapletons, the Philadelphia Eagles, and the Pittsburgh Pirates. He played college football at the University of Georgia. At Georgia he wore number 7.
