= 1931 college football rankings =

- Season: 1931
- Bowl season: 1931–32 bowl games
- End of season champions: USC (Note: per Boand System, Dickinson System, Dunkel System, Houlgate System, Williamson System, Erskine Trophy poll, Berryman QPRS, Billingsley Report, College Football Researchers Association, Helms Athletic Foundation, National Championship Foundation, Poling System, Sagarin Ratings Elo chess method, Sagarin Ratings Predictor method); Pittsburgh (Note: co-champion (alongside Pittsburgh) per Parke H. Davis); Purdue (not claimed) (Note: co-champion (alongside Pittsburgh) per Parke H. Davis)

The 1931 college football rankings ranked the best teams participating in the 1931 college football season. They included a mathematical system operated by Frank G. Dickinson.

== Champions (by ranking) ==
All major rankings (both contemporary and retroactive) have identified the University of Southern California as the season's champions, with exception of Parke H. Davis's retroactive ranking for Spalding's Official Foot Ball Guide, which identified Pittsburgh and Purdue as co-champions.

- Berryman QPRS: University of Southern California
- Billingsley Report: University of Southern California
- Boand System: University of Southern California
- College Football Researchers Association: University of Southern California
- Parke H. Davis (Note: for Spalding's Official Foot Ball Guide): Pittsburgh and Purdue (co-champions)
- Dickinson System: University of Southern California
- Dunkel System: University of Southern California
- Erskine Trophy poll: University of Southern California
- Helms Athletic Foundation: University of Southern California
- Houlgate System: University of Southern California
- National Championship Foundation: University of Southern California
- Poling System: University of Southern California
- Sagarin Ratings Elo chess method: University of Southern California
- Sagarin Ratings Predictor method: University of Southern California
- Williamson System: University of Southern California

Note: Boand System, Dickinson System, Dunkel System, Houlgate System, Williamson System, and Erskine Trophy poll were given contemporarily. All other methods were given retroactively

== Dickinson System ==
The Dickinson System was a mathematical rating system devised by University of Illinois economics professor Frank G. Dickinson. It ranked colleges based upon their records and the strength of their opposition. The system was originally designed to rank teams in the Big Nine (later the Big Ten) conference. Chicago clothing manufacturer Jack Rissman then persuaded Dickinson to rank the nation's teams under the system, and awarded the Rissman Trophy to the winning university. It awarded 30 points for a win over a "strong team", and 20 for a win over a "weak team". Losses were awarded points (15 for loss to a strong team, 10 for loss to a weak team). Ties were treated as half a win and half a loss (22.5 for a tie with a strong team, 15 for a tie with a weak team). An average was then derived by dividing the points by games played.

In 1931, although 11–0 Tulane was unbeaten and untied they were second to 9–1 USC in the final Dickinson System mathematical ratings.

The teams were set to face off in the 1932 Rose Bowl on New Year's Day. The Trojans requested that presentation of the Knute Rockne Memorial Trophy be delayed until after the game. During the delay, it was decided that the Dickinson System trophy would go to the winner of the Rose Bowl game. USC ultimately won the game.

Rank	Team	Record	Rating
1	USC	9–1	26.25
2	Tulane	11–0	24.85
3	Tennessee	8–0–1	23.10
4	Northwestern	7–1–1	22.45
5	Saint Mary's	7–1	22.23
6	Georgia	8–2	21.25
7	Harvard	7–1	19.50
8	Yale	5–1–2	18.79
9	Pittsburgh	8–1	17.50
10	Purdue	7–1	16.58
11	Notre Dame	8–2–1	16.17

== See also ==
- 1931 College Football All-America Team
