= 1931 USC Trojans football team =

American college football season

1931 USC Trojans football

National champion PCC champion Rose Bowl champion

Rose Bowl (NCG), W 21–12 vs. Tulane
- Conference: Pacific Coast Conference
- Record: 10–1 (7–0 PCC)
- Head coach: Howard Jones (7th season)
- Offensive scheme: Single-wing
- Captain: Stan Williamson
- Home stadium: Los Angeles Memorial Coliseum

1931 Pacific Coast Conference football standings
	Conf.					Overall
Team	W		L		T	W		L		T
No. 1 USC $	7	–	0	–	0	10	–	1	–	0
California	4	–	1	–	0	8	–	2	–	0
Oregon	3	–	1	–	1	6	–	2	–	2
Washington State	4	–	3	–	0	6	–	4	–	0
Washington	3	–	3	–	1	5	–	3	–	1
Stanford	2	–	2	–	1	7	–	2	–	2
Oregon State	1	–	3	–	1	6	–	3	–	1
Idaho	1	–	4	–	0	3	–	4	–	0
UCLA	0	–	3	–	0	3	–	4	–	1
Montana	0	–	5	–	0	1	–	6	–	0
$ – Conference champion; Rankings from Dickinson System

The 1931 USC Trojans football team was an American football team that represented the University of Southern California (USC) in the Pacific Coast Conference (PCC) during the 1931 college football season. In their seventh season under head coach Howard Jones, the Trojans lost the opening game to Saint Mary's and then won the remaining ten games of the season. They finished the season with a 10–1 record (7–0 against PCC opponents), shut out six of eleven opponents, outscored all opponents by a total of 363 to 52, and won the PCC and national championships.

== Schedule ==
Date	Opponent	Site	Result	Attendance	Source
September 26	Saint Mary's*	Los Angeles Memorial Coliseum; Los Angeles, CA	L 7–13	70,000	
October 3	Oregon State	Los Angeles Memorial Coliseum; Los Angeles, CA	W 30–0	50,000	
October 10	Washington State	Los Angeles Memorial Coliseum; Los Angeles, CA	W 38–6	30,000	
October 17	Oregon	Los Angeles Memorial Coliseum; Los Angeles, CA	W 53–0	50,000	
October 24	at California	California Memorial Stadium; Berkeley, CA	W 6–0	53,957	
November 7	Stanford	Los Angeles Memorial Coliseum; Los Angeles, CA (rivalry)	W 19–0	93,000	
November 14	Montana	Los Angeles Memorial Coliseum; Los Angeles, CA	W 69–0	20,000	
November 21	at Notre Dame*	Notre Dame Stadium; Notre Dame, IN (rivalry)	W 16–14	50,731	
December 5	Washington^{†}	Los Angeles Memorial Coliseum; Los Angeles, CA	W 44–7	55,000	
December 12	Georgia*	Los Angeles Memorial Coliseum; Los Angeles, CA	W 60–0	75,000	
January 1, 1932	vs. Tulane*	Rose Bowl; Pasadena, CA (Rose Bowl)	W 21–12	84,000	
*Non-conference game; ^{†}Homecoming

== National championship ==
The Dickinson System rankings were released on December 12, 1931, and ranked USC No. 1 and Tulane Green Wave No. 2. The 1932 Rose Bowl matched No. 1 USC against No. 2 Tulane with USC prevailing by a 21–12 score. After their victory in the Rose Bowl, the Trojans were presented with the Albert Russel Erskine Trophy for the 1931 national football championship.

In addition to Dickinson, USC was recognized as the 1931 national champion by the great majority of later rankings and analyses, including the Billingsley Report, Boand System, College Football Researchers Association, Dunkel System, Helms Athletic Foundation, Houlgate System, National Championship Foundation, Poling System, Sagarin Ratings, and Berryman (QPRS).

== Awards and honors ==
Two USC players, fullback Gaius Shaver and guard Johnny Baker, were selected as consensus first-team players on the 1931 All-America college football team. Shaver led the team with 938 rushing yards and 90 points scored. Two other USC players received first-team All-America honors from at least one selector: halfback Erny Pinckert (AP, NEA, Liberty) and center Stan Williamson (Liberty).

Eight USC players received first-team honors on the 1931 All-Pacific Coast football team: quarterback Gaius Shaver (AP-1, UP-1); quarterback Orville Mohler (NEA-1); halfback Erny Pinckert (AP-1, NEA-1, UP-1); ends Ray Sparling (AP-1) and Garrett Arbelbide (NEA-1); tackle Ernie Smith (AP-1); guard Johnny Baker (AP-1, NEA-1, UP-1); and center Stan Williamson (AP-1, NEA-1, UP-1).

== Roster ==
- Garrett Arbelbide, end
- Johnny Baker, guard (College Football Hall of Fame)
- Dick Barber, fullback
- Blanchard Beatty, quarterback
- Henry Biggs, end
- Willard Brouse, quarterback
- Tay Brown, tackle
- Gordon Clark, halfback
- Eugene Clarke, end
- Harvey Durkee, end
- John Dye, guard
- Robert Erskine, tackle
- Kenneth Fay, halfback
- Byron Gentry, guard
- Homer Griffith, quarterback
- Robert H. Hall, tackle
- Harold Hammack, halfback
- J. Howard Joslin, end
- Thomas Mallory, halfback
- Francis McGinley, guard
- Bob McNeish, halfback
- Orville Mohler, quarterback
- Jim Musick, fullback
- George Norene, center
- Neil Norris, end
- James Owens, quarterback
- Ford Palmer, end
- Erny Pinckert, halfback (College Football Hall of Fame)
- Alfred Plaehn, tackle
- Gene Ridings, fullback
- Aaron Rosenberg, guard
- Gaius Shaver, fullback/quarterback
- Thomas Bert Sherman, fullback
- Ernie Smith, tackle
- Ray Sparling, end
- Barry Stephens, halfback
- Lawrence Stevens, guard
- Herbert Tatsch, tackle
- Roderick Thompson, tackle
- Howie Tipton, halfback
- Frank Williamson, guard
- Stan Williamson, center
- Curt Youel, center
