= The All American (film) =

1932 film

- Directed by: Russell Mack
- Screenplay by: Ferdinand Reyher; Frank Wead
- Story by: Richard Schayer; Dale Van Every
- Produced by: E. M. Asher
- Starring: Richard Arlen; Andy Devine; Gloria Stuart
- Cinematography: George Robinson
- Edited by: Robert Carlisle
- Production company: Universal Pictures
- Distributed by: Universal Pictures
- Release date: October 7, 1932 (Los Angeles)
- Running time: 73 or 78 minutes or 79 minutes
- Country: United States
- Language: English

The All American is a 1932 American pre-Code sports drama film directed by Russell Mack and written by Ferdinand Reyher and Frank Wead. The film stars Richard Arlen, Andy Devine and Gloria Stuart. It was given its premiere in Los Angeles on October 7, 1932, by Universal Pictures. Many noted real-life football players and a coach appeared uncredited in the film.

== Plot ==
College football hero Gary King's life changes for the worse when the allure of money results in a business arrangement with untrustworthy Willie Walsh and a romance with heiress Gloria Neuchard, changing all his previous plans.

Gary spurns sweetheart Ellen Steffens and puts off a promise to best friend Steve Kelly to launch a construction business together. His lavish spending on Gloria and gambling habit result in Gary falling deeply in debt.

In the meantime, Gary's younger brother Bob has become an All-American football star. Bob is married to Betty Poe and all is well until wealthy Gloria and scheming Willie turn up again. When a football game is scheduled between Bob's school and a team of older all-stars, an opportunity arises for Gary to play against his brother and teach him not to make the same mistakes he did.

== Cast ==
- Richard Arlen as Gary King
- Andy Devine as Andy Moran
- Gloria Stuart as Ellen Steffens
- James Gleason as Chick Knipe
- John Darrow as Bob King
- Preston Foster as Steve Kelly
- June Clyde as Betty Poe
- Merna Kennedy as Gloria Neuchard
- Harold Waldridge as Willie "Scheming Willie" Walsh
- Harvey Clark as Gresham McCormick
- Huntley Gordon as Harcourt
- Earl McCarthy as Ted Brown
- Ethel Clayton as Mrs. Bowen
- Margaret Lindsay as Miss Bowen
- George Irving as Mr. King
- Florence Roberts as Mrs. King
- Frederick Burton as Mr. Neuchard
- Karlton Kadell as Ken Neuchard
- Manfred Vezie as Mike "Big Mike" Allen
- James Flavin as Don Lindsay
- Earle Foxe as Read
- Arthur Hoyt as Smythe
- Fred Howard as Radio Announcer
- Franklin Parker as Radio Announcer
- Maurice Black as "Blackie" Doyle
- Frank Hagney as "Hop" McComb
- Reginald Barlow as The Bank President
- Robert Ellis as Walter Grant
- Miami Alvarez as Miss Wilson
- Rockliffe Fellowes as Gelt
- Jack La Rue as Joe Fiore

Uncredited:

- Marger Apsit as Football Player
- Johnny Baker as Football Player
- Walter Brennan as News Commentator At Game
- Frank Carideo as Football Player
- Jesse Hibbs as Football Player
- Moon Mullins as Football Player
- Ernie Nevers as Football Player
- Erny Pinckert as Football Player
- Lafayette Russell as Football Player
- Paul Schwegler as Football Player
- Gaius Shaver as Football Player
- Pop Warner as Himself

== Reception ==
The New York Times critic gave it a mixed review, writing, "As a dramatic entertainment, it is not quite so satisfactory. ... The scenarists in 'The All American' are too strenuous in their zeal to show the perils of national publicity for the young collegiates who have a battle to fight with life when they leave college." The reviewer did praise the "outstanding performance" of Gleason and noted that "Mr. Arlen is earnest and attractive in the principal rôle."

== See also ==
- List of American football films
