= Curt Youel =

American football player and coach (1911–1968)

Biographical details
- Born: June 8, 1911
- Died: August 3, 1968 (aged 57); Santa Monica, California, U.S.

Playing career

Football
- 1931–1933: USC
- Position: Lineman

Coaching career (HC unless noted)

Football
- 1936–1954: Santa Monica

Basketball
- ?: Santa Monica

Baseball
- 1937–?: Santa Monica

Administrative career (AD unless noted)
- 1955–1968: Santa Monica

Curtis Linton Youel (June 8, 1911 – August 3, 1968) was an American football player and coach. He was served as the head football coach of Santa Monica City College from 1936 to 1954 and as the school's athletic director from 1955 to 1968.

== Collegiate athletic career ==
Youel played for Howard Jones' Thundering Herd from 1931 to 1933. The USC Trojans won two national championships in a row in 1931 and 1932. Youel played the position of center and lettered all three years.

The 1932 team reportedly had the best defense in the history of the program. The defensive unit allowed only two touchdowns all season. The defensive line consisted of All-American Aaron Rosenberg, Tay Brown, Ernie Smith, J. Dye, Byron Gentry, Ray Sparling, Robert Erskine, Curt Youel, Julius Bescos. Curtis Youel wore number 35 and is on the list of all time 35s as noted on the Tribute to Troy website and the USC alumni site. The Trojans beat Pittsburgh in the 1933 Rose Bowl, 35–0, completing a record defensive year, allowing only two touchdowns.

Youel also lettered in baseball in the 1932 season. He played first base. He later turned down a professional baseball contract with the Chicago White Sox to coach instead, according to his son Bradley.

== Coaching career ==
Youel also coached baseball and golf. His golf teams were renowned in the 1950s. They won more than 100 matches and lost six according to the Santa Monica Evening Outlook in August 1968, written by Carl White, sports editor in his column "follow the ball".

== Death ==
Youel died on August 3, 1968, in Santa Monica, California, after suffering from Parkinson's disease.
