= Paul Schwegler =

American football player and actor (1907–1980)

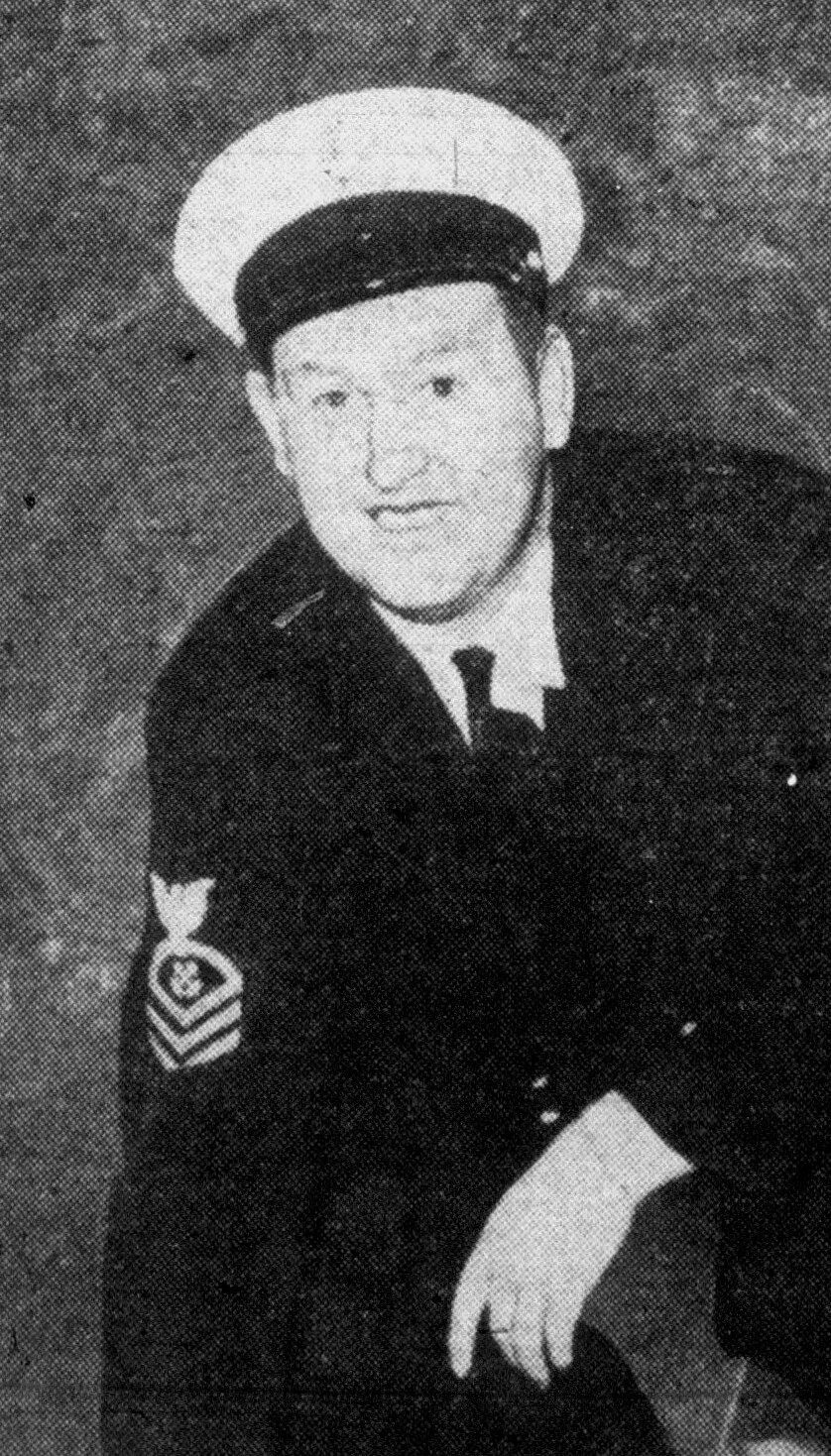
- Schwegler, circa 1942

Profile
- Position: Tackle

Personal information
- Born: May 22, 1907; Chicago, Illinois, U.S.
- Died: December 7, 1980 (aged 73); Newport Beach, California, U.S.
- Listed height: 6 ft 4 in (1.93 m)
- Listed weight: 205 lb (93 kg)

Career information
- High school: Raymond HS (Raymond, Washington)
- College: Washington (1929–1931)

Awards and highlights
- First-team All-American (1931); Third-team All-American (1929); 3× First-team All-PCC (1929, 1930, 1931)
- College Football Hall of Fame (Class of 1967)

Paul Anthony Schwegler (May 22, 1907 – December 7, 1980) was an American gridiron football player and actor, best known for playing college football at the University of Washington during 1929–1931. He was inducted to the College Football Hall of Fame in 1967.

== Biography ==
Born in Chicago to immigrant parents from Germany and Russian Poland, Schwegler attended high school in Raymond, Washington, where he played football and basketball.

=== Football ===
Schwegler attended the University of Washington where he played as a tackle for the Huskies football program for the 1929–1931 seasons and was a member of Kappa Sigma fraternity. He served as captain of the 1931 football team. (Note: The university yearbook stated that a captain was appointed for each game, then Schwegler was selected as honorary captain of the season by his teammates.) Schwegler was recognized as a standout player despite Washington compiling an overall 12–13–2 record during his three seasons. He was named by some selectors to the 1929 College Football All-America Team and 1931 College Football All-America Team, and was a selection to the All-Pacific Coast football team three times.

At the end of his college career, Schwegler played in the January 1932 edition of the East–West Shrine Game. In 1934, he played for the Stanford Braves, a team in the Pacific Pro Football League, an early professional league. He also coached three youth teams, for players aged 12–14, during that season. Schwegler returned in 1935 to play for the Hollywood Braves; the league that year was known as the American Legion League.

In February 1937, Schwegler made sports headlines by suggesting that college football players should stage a sitdown strike until getting paid to play.

Schwegler was inducted to several halls of fame: the College Football Hall of Fame in 1967, the Husky Hall of Fame at the University of Washington in 1983, and the State of Washington Sports Hall of Fame in 1986.

=== Acting ===
Schwegler's athletic experience helped to launch a modest acting career in Hollywood during the 1930s. His film appearances include:

- The All American (1932), with various other football players
- 365 Nights in Hollywood (1934), in a brief appearances as Tarzan
- Bright Eyes (1934), with fellow football player Fred Crawford; film starred Shirley Temple
- Fighting Youth (1935), with various other football players
- Modern Times (1936), with fellow football players Nate Barragar and Ernie Smith; in a scene where Charlie Chaplin is a waiter

Schwegler accompanied Hollywood director Tay Garnett on a work voyage that began in November 1935 from Los Angeles, crossing the Pacific through Asia and on to Europe. Stops included Honolulu, Guam, Manila, Singapore, Colombo, India, Arabia, Egypt, and Spain. Undertaken to film locations for use as backdrops in movies, the yacht and its crew reached the U.S. east coast in October 1936. Articles that Schwegler wrote about the voyage were published in The Birmingham News in January 1937, and the June 1937 edition of Pacific Motor Boat magazine. By August 1938, Schwegler was no longer working with Garnett, having gone into the music publishing business with a partner.

=== Personal life ===
In September 1938, Schwegler wed Eda Hellman in Reno, Nevada. A daughter was born to the couple in May 1942. In June 1942, Schwegler joined the United States Navy as a chief specialist to assist with military recruitment in the Los Angeles area; he served until October 1945.

As of February 1950, Schwegler was working as the public relations director of a wine company. By 1958, he was the sales manager of a film processing company. He was frequently mentioned in Los Angeles-area newspapers for activities such as organizing blood drives.

Schwegler died in December 1980 at his residence in Newport Beach, California; he was survived by his wife and a daughter.
