= Modern Times (film) =

1936 film by Charlie Chaplin

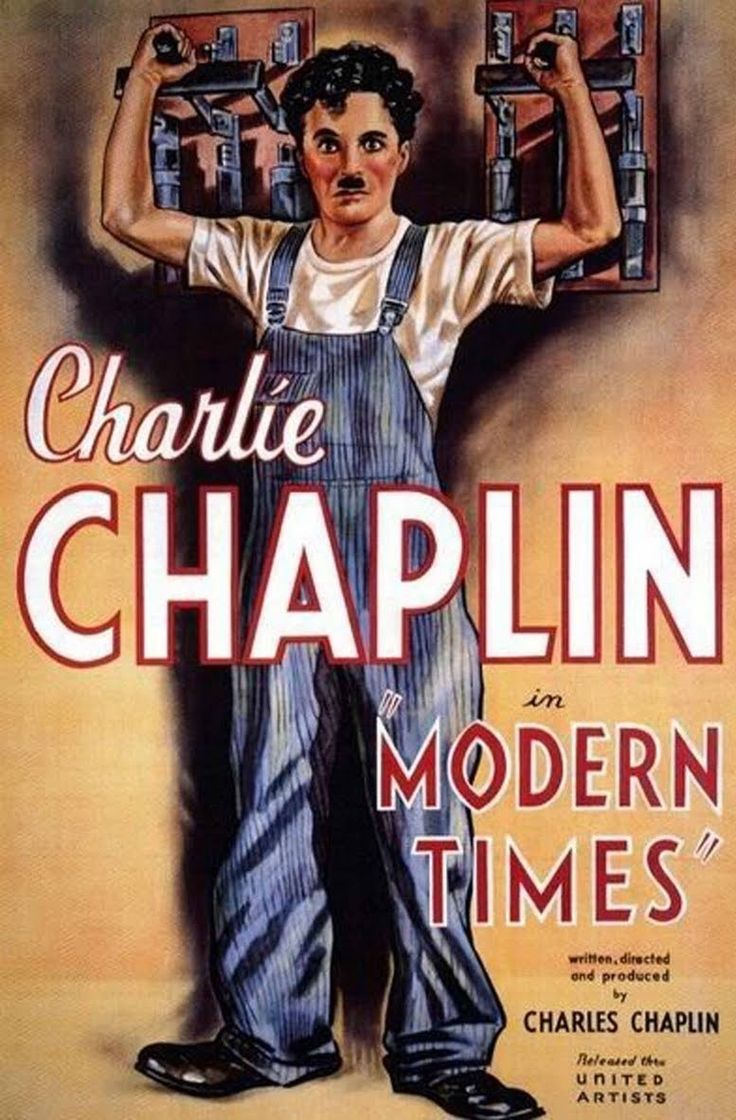
- Theatrical release poster
- Directed by: Charlie Chaplin
- Written by: Charlie Chaplin
- Produced by: Charlie Chaplin
- Starring: Charlie Chaplin; Paulette Goddard; Henry Bergman; Tiny Sandford; Chester Conklin
- Cinematography: Ira H. Morgan; Roland Totheroh
- Edited by: Charlie Chaplin; Willard Nico
- Music by: Charlie Chaplin
- Production company: Charles Chaplin Productions
- Distributed by: United Artists
- Release dates: February 5, 1936 (New York City, premiere); February 25, 1936 (USA)
- Running time: 87 minutes
- Country: United States
- Languages: Sound (part-talkie); English intertitles
- Budget: $1.5 million
- Box office: $1.8 million (U.S. and Canada rentals)

Modern Times is a 1936 American part-talkie satirical slapstick comedy film produced, scored, co-edited, written and directed by Charlie Chaplin. In Chaplin's last performance as the iconic Little Tramp, his character struggles to survive in the modern, industrialized world. The film also stars Paulette Goddard, Henry Bergman, Tiny Sandford and Chester Conklin.

Modern Times has won many awards and honors, and is widely considered one of the greatest films ever. It was one of the first 25 films selected by the Library of Congress for preservation in the National Film Registry for being "culturally, historically, or aesthetically significant".

== Plot ==
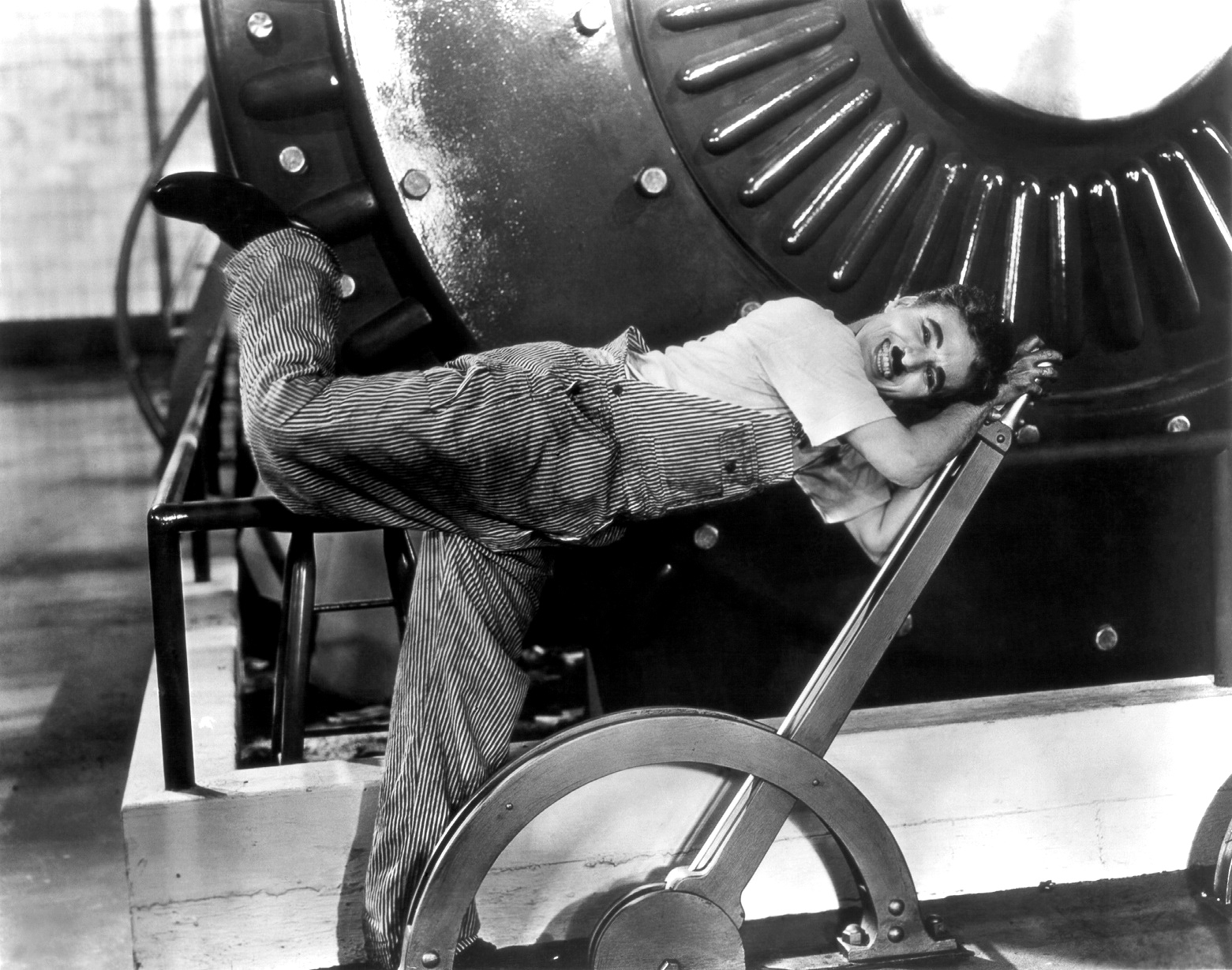
The Tramp working on the giant machine in the film's most famous scene

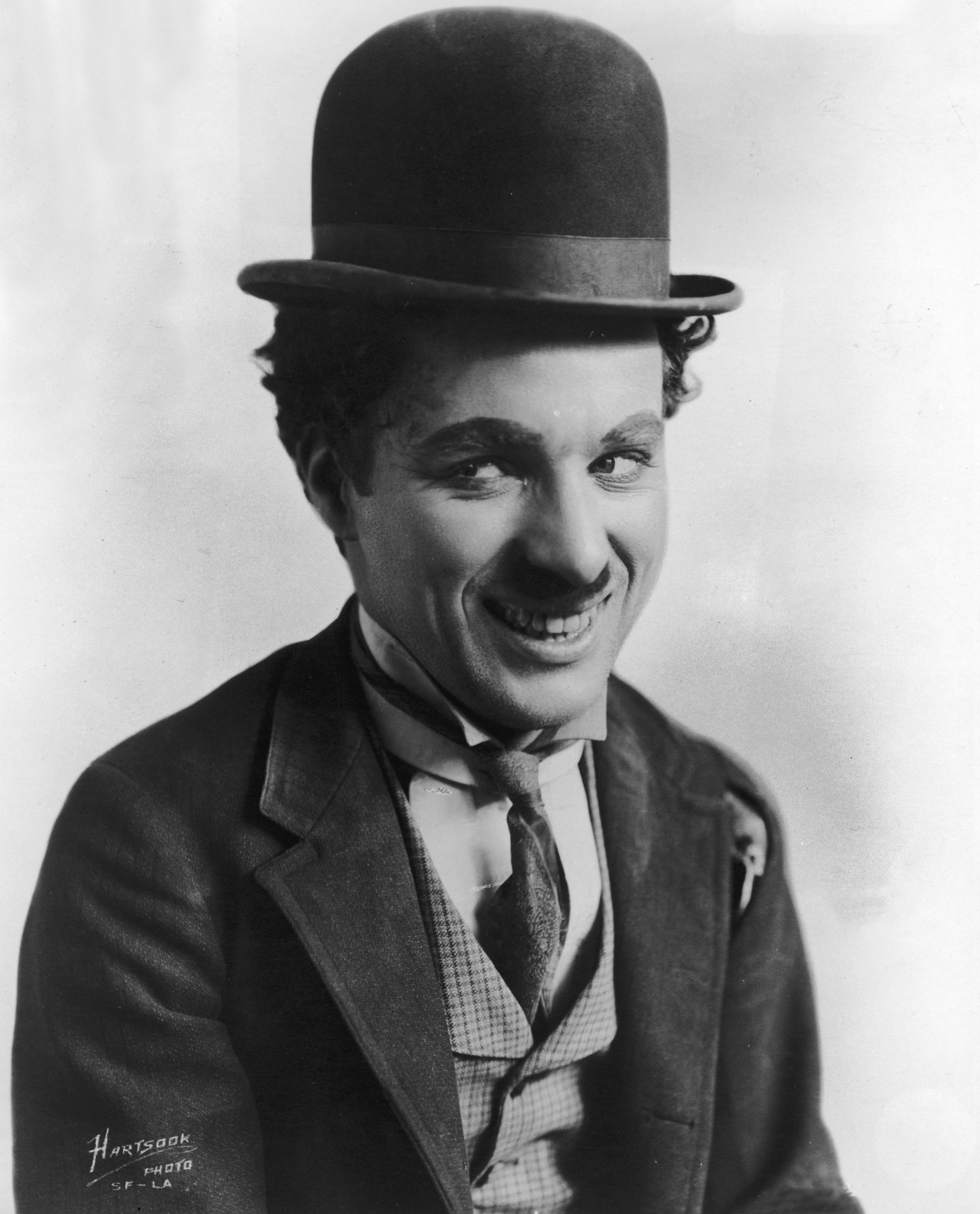
Charlie Chaplin as The Tramp

During the Great Depression, The Tramp works on an assembly line, where he suffers greatly due to the stress and pace of the repetitive work and being used to test a defective automatic feeding machine being pitched to the factory's director. He eventually suffers a nervous breakdown and runs amok, getting stuck within a machine and throwing the factory into chaos; he is then sent to the hospital. Following his recovery, the now-unemployed Tramp is mistaken as the leader of a communist demonstration and arrested. In jail, he accidentally ingests smuggled cocaine, and in his subsequent delirium, he avoids being put back in his cell. When he returns to his cellblock, he stumbles upon a jailbreak and knocks the convicts unconscious for which he is hailed as a hero and given special treatment. When he is informed that he will soon be released due to his heroic actions, he argues unsuccessfully that he prefers life in jail but is given a reference by the county sheriff.

Upon release, he applies for a new job with a shipbuilder but leaves after causing an accident. Soon after, he runs into an orphaned street urchin, Ellen, who is fleeing the police after stealing a loaf of bread. Determined to go back to jail and to save her from arrest, the Tramp tells the police that he is the thief and asks to be arrested, but a witness reveals his deception and he is freed. He then eats an enormous amount of food at a cafeteria without paying to get arrested, and once again encounters Ellen in a paddy wagon after he is put in it. It soon crashes, and she convinces him to escape with her. The Tramp then gets a job as a night watchman at a department store, and encounters three burglars led by "Big Bill," a fellow worker from the factory, who explains that they are hungry and desperate. After sharing drinks with them, he wakes up the next morning during opening hours and is arrested once again for failing to call the police on the burglars and for sleeping in the store's clothes on a desk, shocking a customer and the storekeeper.

Days later, Ellen takes him to a run-down shack to live in. The next morning, he reads about an old factory's re-opening and lands a job as a mechanic's assistant, accidentally destroying several of his possesssions and getting him trapped in machinery. The other workers then suddenly decide to go on strike, and tell the Tramp to leave with them. Outside the factory, he accidentally launches a brick at a policeman and is arrested again.

He is released two weeks later, by which time Ellen has become a café dancer. She gets him a job as a singer and waiter, but he goes about his duties clumsily. During his floor show, he loses his cuffs, which bear the lyrics to his song, but he rescues the act by improvising the lyrics using gibberish and by pantomiming. When the police arrive to arrest Ellen for her earlier escape, the two are forced to flee again. Ellen despairs that their struggles are all pointless, but the Tramp reassures her. Come bright dawn the next day they walk down the road towards an uncertain but hopeful future.

== Cast ==
- Charlie Chaplin as a factory worker (The Tramp)
- Paulette Goddard as Ellen Peterson "The Gamin"
- Henry Bergman as the Café proprietor
- Stanley "Tiny" Sandford as Big Bill
- Chester Conklin as a Mechanic
- Al Ernest Garcia as the President of the Electro Steel Corp.
- Stanley Blystone as Gamin's father
- Richard Alexander as the prison cellmate
- Cecil Reynolds as the Minister
- Mira McKinney as the Minister's wife
- Murdock MacQuarrie as J. Widdecombe Billows, inventor
- Wilfred Lucas as the Juvenile Officer
- Edward LeSaint as Sheriff Couler
- Fred Malatesta as the Café head waiter
- Sammy Stein as the turbine operator
- Hank Mann as burglar with Big Bill
- Louis Natheaux as burglar with Big Bill
- Juana Sutton as the woman with buttoned bosom
- Ted Oliver as Billow's assistant
- Gloria Delson as Gamin's sister
- Gloria DeHaven as Gamin's sister
- Bobby Barber as Worker
- Heinie Conklin as Worker
- Harry Wilson as Worker
- Fred Shields as speaker on phonograph record
- Paul Schwegler as football player
- Nate Barragar as football player
- Ernie Smith as football player

== Production ==
The film's trailer

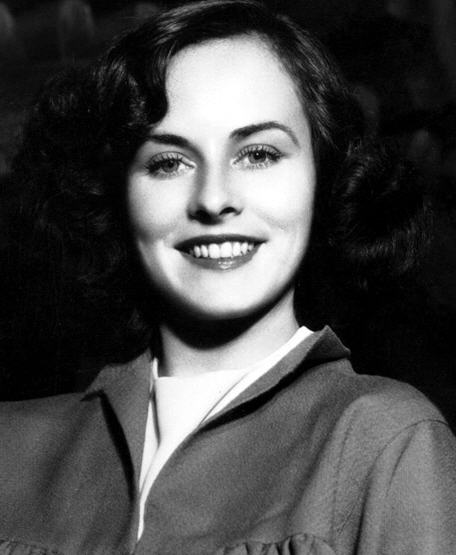
Paulette Goddard

During a European tour promoting City Lights, Chaplin got the inspiration for Modern Times from both the lamentable conditions of the continent through the Great Depression, along with a conversation with Mahatma Gandhi in which they discussed modern technology. Chaplin did not understand why Gandhi generally opposed it, though he granted that "machinery with only consideration of profit" had put people out of work and ruined lives.

Chaplin began preparing the film in 1934 as his first "talkie", and went as far as writing a dialogue script and experimenting with some sound scenes. However, he soon abandoned these attempts and reverted to a silent format with synchronized sound effects and sparse dialogue. The dialogue experiments confirmed his long-standing conviction that the universal appeal of his "Little Tramp" character would be lost if the character ever spoke on screen. Most of the film was shot at "silent speed", 18 frames per second, which when projected at "sound speed", 24 frames per second, made the slapstick action appear even more frenetic. The duration of filming was long for the time, beginning on October 11, 1934, and ending on August 30, 1935.

Chaplin biographer Jeffrey Vance has noted: “Chaplin recognized that Modern Times was the valedictory for the Tramp and deliberately included many gags and sequences as a loving farewell to the character and an homage to the visual comedy tradition."

This film also famously uses matte painting in the harrowing skating scene where the Tramp skates blindfolded, not realizing he is constantly near the edge and very likely could fall down. The illusory drop had been matte-painted, and Chaplin was never in actual danger while filming this scene — in reality, he skated on a plain floor, with a ledge for him to discern when to stop. This can be observed in the fact that, at one moment, Chaplin's back wheel briefly disappeared behind the painting. This most likely escaped the eyes of Chaplin, which could be the reason he left it in.

The reference to drugs seen in the prison sequence is somewhat daring for the time (since the production code, established in 1930 and enforced since 1934, forbade the depiction of illegal drug use in films); Chaplin had made drug references before in one of his most famous short films, Easy Street, released in 1917.

== Music ==
The music score was composed by Chaplin himself, and arranged with the assistance of Alfred Newman, who had collaborated with Chaplin on the music score of his previous film City Lights. Newman and Chaplin had a falling out near the end of the Modern Times soundtrack recording sessions, leading to Newman's angry departure.

The romance theme was later given lyrics, and became the pop standard "Smile", first recorded by Nat King Cole. A cover of this song by Jimmy Durante was also used in the trailer for the 2019 film Joker, in which the lead character also watches scenes from a showing of Modern Times after sneaking into a movie theatre.

Modern Times was the first film wherein Chaplin's voice is heard as he performs Léo Daniderff's comical song "Je cherche après Titine". Chaplin's version is also known as "The Nonsense Song", as his character sings it in gibberish. The lyrics are nonsensical but appear to contain words from French and Italian; the use of deliberately half-intelligible wording for comic effect points the way towards Adenoid Hynkel's speeches in The Great Dictator.

According to film composer David Raksin, Chaplin wrote the music as a young man wanting to make a name for himself. He would sit, often in the washroom, humming tunes and telling Raksin to "take this down". Raksin's job was to turn the humming into a score and create timings and synchronization that fit the situations. Chaplin was a violinist and had some musical knowledge, but he was not an orchestrator and was unfamiliar with synchronization. Along with Edward B. Powell, Raksin did receive screen credit for the music arrangements. Raksin later created scores for films including Laura and The Day After.

== Reception ==
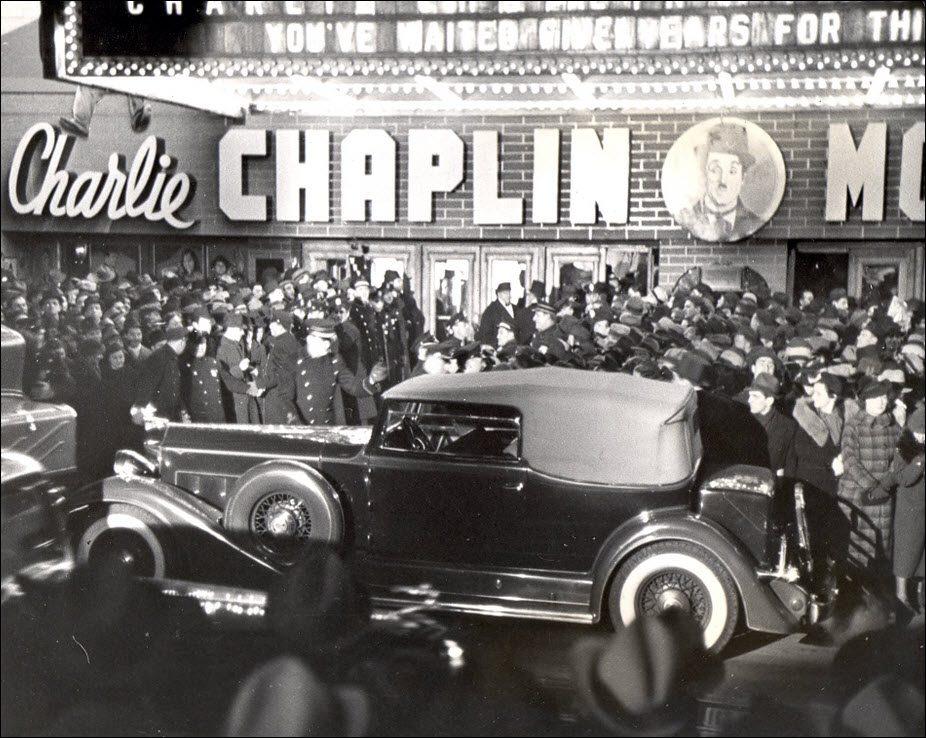
World premiere of Modern Times (1936), New York

Modern Times is often hailed as one of Chaplin's greatest achievements, and it remains one of his most popular films. It holds an approval rating of 98% on Rotten Tomatoes based on 108 reviews, with a weighted average of 9.4/10. The website's critical consensus reads, "A slapstick skewering of industrialized America, Modern Times is as politically incisive as it is laugh-out-loud hilarious." Metacritic reports an aggregated score of 96/100 based on 4 critics, indicating "universal acclaim".

Naming it the Best Film of the 30s Decade, Flickside writes: "Chaplin's Modern Times is a thoughtful critique on the anxieties of modernization dealt with pathos and humour." Contemporary reviews were very positive. Frank Nugent of The New York Times wrote: "'Modern Times' has still the same old Charlie, the lovable little fellow whose hands and feet and prankish eyebrows can beat an irresistible tattoo upon an audience's funnybone or hold it still, taut beneath the spell of human tragedy ... Time has not changed his genius." Variety called it "grand fun and sound entertainment". Film Daily wrote: "Charlie Chaplin has scored one of his greatest triumphs." John Mosher of The New Yorker wrote that Chaplin "manufactures some superb laughs ... In all, it's a rambling sketch, a little at loose ends at times, sometimes rather slight in effect, and now and then secure in its rich, old-fashioned funniness." Burns Mantle called the film "another hilariously rowdy success".

Writing for The Spectator in 1936, Graham Greene strongly praised the film, noting that, although there had always been a bit of a dated feel to his previous works, Chaplin "has at last definitely entered the contemporary scene". Greene noted that, whereas prior Chaplin films had featured "fair and featureless" heroines, the casting of Paulette Goddard suggested that his female characters might be presented with more personality than previously. He also voiced concern that the film would be considered to be a Communist film when in reality Chaplin's message was predominantly apolitical: "[Chaplin] presents, he doesn't offer political solutions."

French philosophers Jean-Paul Sartre, Simone de Beauvoir and Maurice Merleau-Ponty named their journal, Les Temps modernes, after it.

Modern Times earned $1.8 million in North American theatrical rentals during its release, becoming one of the top-grossing films of 1936. It was the most popular film at the British box office in 1935–36.

The iconic depiction of Chaplin working frantically to keep up with an assembly line inspired later comedy routines including Disney's Der Fuehrer's Face (Donald Duck alternately assembling artillery shells and saluting portraits of Adolf Hitler) and an episode of I Love Lucy titled "Job Switching" (Lucy and Ethel trying to keep up with an ever-increasing volume of chocolate candies, eventually stuffing them in their mouths, hats, and blouses). The opening of a fantasy sequence in the film, in which the unemployed factory worker trips over a footstool upon entering the living room of his "dream home" with the Gamin, inspired a similar opening to The Dick Van Dyke Show.

This was Chaplin's first overtly political-themed film, and its unflattering portrayal of industrial society generated controversy in some quarters upon its initial release. Writing in The Liberal News, the official magazine of the British Liberal Party, in October 1936, Willoughby Dewar observed that Modern Times "should be seen by every Young Liberal. It is, among other things, a piece of first-class Liberal propaganda." In Nazi Germany, propaganda minister Joseph Goebbels banned the film from being shown because of its alleged advocacy of communism.

The film exhibits slight similarities to a lesser-known 1931 French film directed by René Clair entitled À nous la liberté (Liberty for Us) – the assembly line sequence is an instance in that both films depict it, but in different ways. The German film company Tobis Film, hungry for cash, sued Chaplin following the film's release but to no avail. They sued again after World War II (considered revenge for Chaplin's anti-Nazi statements in The Great Dictator). This time, they settled with Chaplin out of court. Clair, a friend and huge admirer of Chaplin who was flattered that the film icon would depict a similar subject, was deeply embarrassed by Tobis Film's action and was never part of the case.

An American copyright infringement case brought over a 1934 book, entitled Against Gray Walls or Lawyer's Dramatic Escapes, was dismissed after the court found the film and book were so dissimilar that the record did not show copying.

The film did attract criticism for being almost completely silent. Chaplin feared that the mystery and romanticism of the Tramp character would be ruined if he spoke, and also that it would alienate his fans in non-English speaking territories. His future films, however, would be full-fledged "talkies" – although without the character of the Little Tramp.

Chaplin biographer Jeffrey Vance has written of the reception and legacy of the film:

Modern Times is perhaps more meaningful now than at any time since its first release. The twentieth-century theme of the film, farsighted for its time—the struggle to eschew alienation and preserve humanity in a modern, mechanized world—profoundly reflects issues facing the twenty-first century. The Tramp's travails in Modern Times and the comedic mayhem that ensues should provide strength and comfort to all who feel like helpless cogs in a world beyond control. Through its universal themes and comic inventiveness, Modern Times remains one of Chaplin's greatest and most enduring works. Perhaps more important, it is the Tramp's finale, a tribute to Chaplin's most beloved character and the silent-film era he commanded for a generation.

The film is recognized by American Film Institute in these lists:

- 1998: AFI's 100 Years ... 100 Movies – #81
- 2000: AFI's 100 Years ... 100 Laughs – #33
- 2007: AFI's 100 Years ... 100 Movies (10th Anniversary Edition) – #78

The Village Voice ranked Modern Times at No. 62 in its Top 250 "Best Films of the Century" list in 1999, based on a poll of critics. In January 2002, the film was included on the list of the "Top 100 Essential Films of All Time" by the National Society of Film Critics. The film was voted at No. 74 on the list of "100 Greatest Films" by the prominent French magazine Cahiers du cinéma in 2008. In the 2002 Sight and Sound poll of the greatest films of all time, Modern Times ranked 35th among critics. In The Sight and Sound Greatest Films of All Time 2012 critics' poll, it was ranked the 63rd-greatest film ever made in the critics' poll and 20th in the directors' poll. In 2015, Modern Times ranked 67th on BBC's "100 Greatest American Films" list, voted on by film critics from around the world. The film was voted at No. 12 on the list of The 100 greatest comedies of all time by a poll of 253 film critics from 52 countries conducted by the BBC in 2017. In 2021 it ranked 49th on Time Out magazine's list of The 100 best movies of all time. In The Sight and Sound Greatest Films of All Time 2022, Modern Times was ranked at 78th place in the critic's poll and 72nd in the director's poll.

The film was included by the Vatican in a list of important films compiled in 1995, under the category of "Art".

== Restoration ==
A digitally restored version of the film was released in 2003. The French company MK2 searched the world for good copies of the original footage, cut them together and processed each of the 126,000 frames, removing scratches and dust, and ensuring optimal image stability and balanced black and white tone levels. The restored version was first shown at the Cannes Film Festival in 2003. In 2013 Cineteca di Bologna and the Criterion Collection effected further digital improvements of the 2003 version, as noted in a preface ahead of the title.

== See also ==
- Fordism
- List of United States comedy films
- List of films considered the best
