= Orville Mohler =

American football and baseball player (1909–1949)

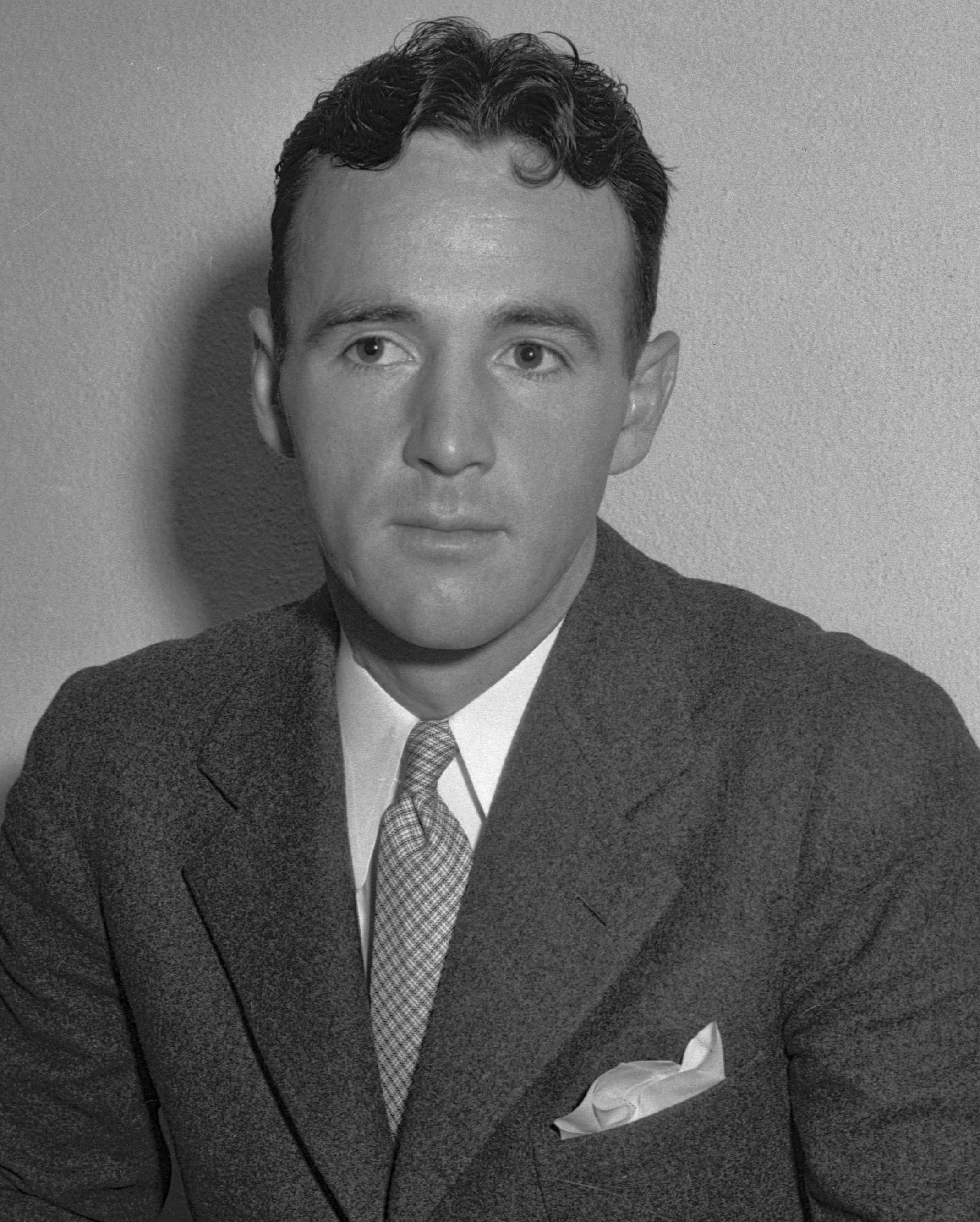
- Mohler during the 1930s

Biographical details
- Born: May 29, 1909; Los Angeles, California, U.S.
- Died: November 26, 1949 (aged 40) near Dixiana, Alabama, U.S.

Playing career

Football
- 1930–1932: USC

Baseball
- 1930–1932: USC
- 1933: Mission Reds
- 1933: Los Angeles Angels
- Positions: Quarterback (football); Shortstop (baseball)

Coaching career (HC unless noted)

Football
- 1943: Wright Field

Head coaching record
- Overall: 1–0–1

Accomplishments and honors

Championships
- 2× National (1931, 1932)

Awards
- Second-team All-American (1931); 2× First-team All-PCC (1931, 1932); Second-team All-PCC (1930)

Orville Ernest Mohler (May 29, 1909 – November 27, 1949), sometimes referred to as Orv Mohler, was an American football and baseball player. He grew up in Alhambra, California, and attended the University of Southern California (USC). At USC, Mohler was the student council president, shortstop for the USC Trojans baseball team, and quarterback for the USC Trojans football team. He led the 1931 USC Trojans football team to a national championship and a victory in the 1932 Rose Bowl, and, at the end of the 1931 season, he was selected by the Central Press Association as a second-team All-American fullback and by the Associated Press as a third-team All-American quarterback. In 1933, after graduating from USC, Mohler played professional baseball in the Pacific Coast League for the Mission Reds. Mohler was married on August 13, 1933 to Bernadine Olson.

In 1927, Mohler became a United States Army Air Corps pilot. In 1943, with the rank of major, he was stationed at Wright Field near Dayton, Ohio. There he was "Chief of the Power Plant unit", which was tasked with testing aircraft engines. Mohler was also head coach of the 1943 Wright Field Kittyhawks football team. He died on November 27, 1949, in the crash of a North American B-25 Mitchell near Dixiana, Alabama. Mohler was buried at Forest Lawn Memorial Park in Glendale, California. He was the son of professional baseball player Kid Mohler (1870–1961).

Mohler was inducted into the USC Hall of Fame in 1995.

== Head coaching record ==
Year	Team	Overall	Conference	Standing	Bowl/playoffs
Wright Field Kittyhawks (Independent) (1943)
1943	Wright Field	1–0–1			
Wright Field:		1–0–1			
Total:		1–0–1			
