= Garrett Arbelbide =

American athlete and football coach (1909–1983)

Biographical details
- Born: September 5, 1909; Redlands, California, U.S.
- Died: July 24, 1983 (aged 73); Sacramento, California, U.S.

Playing career

Football
- 1929–1931: USC

Baseball
- 1930–1932: USC
- 1933: Hollywood Stars
- Positions: End (football); Outfielder, first baseman (baseball)

Coaching career (HC unless noted)

Football
- 1932–1934: Modesto (line)
- 1935: La Verne
- 1936–1939: Arizona State–Flagstaff
- 1942: Santa Ana AAB

Basketball
- 1932–1935: Modesto

Baseball
- 1933–1935: Modesto

Head coaching record
- Overall: 16–28–4 (college football)

Accomplishments and honors

Championships
- National (1931)

Awards
- First-team All-American (1930); Third-team All-American (1931); 2× First-team All-PCC (1930, 1931)

Garrett W. Arbelbide (September 5, 1909 – July 24, 1983) was an American football and baseball player and football coach.

A native of San Bernardino County, California, he grew up in Redlands and played college football at the end position for the USC Trojans football team from 1929 to 1931. He was selected by the Newspaper Enterprise Association and the New York Evening Post as a first-team end on the 1930 College Football All-America Team. He was also selected as a second-team All-American by the Associated Press. He also played on the 1931 USC Trojans football team that won a national championship.

Arbelbide also played college baseball at USC from 1930 to 1932 and professional baseball as an outfielder for the Hollywood Stars of the Pacific Coast League in 1933. He served as the head football coach at La Verne College—now known as the University of La Verne—in 1935 and at Arizona State Teachers College at Flagstaff—now known as Northern Arizona University—from 1936 to 1939.

Arbelbide also served in the United States Army during the World War II era. He was head coach of the 1942 Santa Ana Army Air Base Flyers football team for the first three games of the season before being succeeded by Lieutenant Bobby Decker in mid-October.

Arbelbide also worked as a teacher and rancher. He was married to Fern Arbelbide and had three children (Garrett Lea, Janice and Cindy Lea) and lived in Bakersfield, Santa Barbara, Lodi and Pioneer, California, in his later years. He died in a Sacramento hospital in 1983 at age 72. He was posthumously inducted into the USC Hall of Fame in 1999.

== Head coaching record ==
=== College football ===
Year	Team	Overall	Conference	Standing	Bowl/playoffs
La Verne Leopards (Southern California Conference) (1935)
1935	La Verne	3–6–1	0–4	6th	
La Verne:		3–6–1	0–4		
Arizona State Flagstaff–Lumberjacks (Border Conference) (1936–1939)
1936	Arizona State–Flagstaff	3–4–1	1–2–1	5th	
1937	Arizona State–Flagstaff	5–5	1–4	6th	
1938	Arizona State–Flagstaff	2–6–1	1–2	5th	
1939	Arizona State–Flagstaff	1–6–1	0–4	7th	
Arizona State–Flagstaff:		11–21–3	3–12–1		
Santa Ana Army Air Base Flyers (Independent) (1942)
1942	Santa Ana AAB	2–1 (Note: Arbelbide served as Santa Ana AAB's head coach for the first three games of the season before being succeeded by Lieutenant Bobby Decker in mid-October. The team finished the season with an overall record of 4–4.)			
Santa Ana AAB:		2–1			
Total:		16–28–4			
