= Paul Young (American football) =

American football player (1908–1978)

Profile
- Position: Center

Personal information
- Born: December 7, 1908; Melrose, Minnesota, U.S.
- Died: October 19, 1978 (aged 69); Cambridge, Nebraska, U.S.

Career information
- College: Oklahoma

Career history
- 1933: Green Bay Packers

Awards and highlights
- First-team All-Big Six (1931); Second-team All-Big Six (1932)

Paul Wesly Young (December 7, 1908—October 19, 1978) was an American player in the National Football League (NFL) whose briefly-held position as center for the Green Bay Packers enabled him to participate in two professional games during the 1933 season.

Young was born in Melrose, Minnesota. He was a multi sport athlete at the University of Oklahoma where he played for the school's football and baseball teams. He later played with the Green Bay Packers in 1933. He died in Cambridge, Nebraska, at age 69.
