= Berryman QPRS =

Berryman QPRS, also known as the Berryman Quality Point Rating System, is a mathematical rating system developed by Clyde P. Berryman to rate sports teams and competitors. The Berryman QPRS system considers strength of schedule, win–loss record, points scored, and points allowed. Berryman applied his QPRS system to select college football national champions on a current basis from 1990 to 2011. He also applied the QPRS system retroactively to select national champions for each year from 1920 to 1989. The Berryman QPRS is one of the rating systems used to select historic national champions that is recognized by the National Collegiate Athletic Association (NCAA) in its Football Bowl Subdivision record book.

== Berryman QPRS national champions ==
The following list identifies the college football national champions as selected by the Berryman QPRS methodology.

Retroactive

Season	Champion(s)	Record	Coach
1920	Georgia	8–0–1	Herman Stegeman
1921	California	9–0–1	Andy Smith
1921	Vanderbilt	7–0–1	Dan McGugin
1922	Vanderbilt	8–0–1	Dan McGugin
1923	Illinois	8–0	Robert Zuppke
1923	Yale	8–0	Tad Jones
1924	Notre Dame	10–0	Knute Rockne
1925	Alabama	10–0	Wallace Wade
1926	Alabama	9–0–1	Wallace Wade
1927	Georgia	9–1	George Cecil Woodruff
1928	Georgia Tech	10–0	William Alexander
1929	USC	10–2	Howard Jones
1930	Alabama	10–0	Wallace Wade
1931	USC	10–1	Howard Jones
1932	USC	10–0	Howard Jones
1933	Michigan	7–0–1	Harry Kipke
1934	Alabama	10–0	Frank Thomas
1935	SMU	12–1	Matty Bell
1936	Duke	9–1	Wallace Wade
1937	Pittsburgh	9–0–1	Jock Sutherland
1938	Tennessee	11–0	Robert Neyland
1939	Texas A&M	11–0	Homer Norton
1940	Minnesota	8–0	Bernie Bierman
1941	Texas	8–1–1	Dana X. Bible
1942	Georgia	11–1	Wally Butts
1943	Notre Dame	9–1	Frank Leahy
1944	Army	9–0	Earl Blaik
1945	Army	9–0	Earl Blaik
1946	Notre Dame	8–0–1	Frank Leahy
1947	Michigan	10–0	Fritz Crisler
1948	Michigan	9–0	Bennie Oosterbaan
1949	Notre Dame	10–0	Frank Leahy
1950	Oklahoma	10–1	Bud Wilkinson
1951	Georgia Tech	11–0–1	Bobby Dodd
1952	Georgia Tech	12–0	Bobby Dodd
1953	Oklahoma	9–1–1	Bud Wilkinson
1954	Ohio State	10–0	Woody Hayes
1955	Oklahoma	11–0	Bud Wilkinson
1956	Georgia Tech	10–1	Bobby Dodd
1957	Oklahoma	10–1	Bud Wilkinson
1958	LSU	11–0	Paul Dietzel
1959	Ole Miss	10–1	Johnny Vaught
1960	Iowa	8–1	Forest Evashevski
1961	Alabama	11–0	Paul "Bear" Bryant
1962	LSU	9–1–1	Charles McClendon
1962	USC	11–0	John McKay
1963	Texas	11–0	Darrell Royal
1964	Alabama	10–1	Paul "Bear" Bryant
1965	Michigan State	10–1	Duffy Daugherty
1966	Alabama	11–0	Paul "Bear" Bryant
1967	USC	10–1	John McKay
1968	Ohio State	10–0	Woody Hayes
1969	Texas	11–0	Darrell Royal
1970	Texas	10–1	Darrell Royal
1971	Nebraska	13–0	Bob Devaney
1972	USC	12–0	John McKay
1973	Alabama	11–1	Paul "Bear" Bryant
1974	Oklahoma	11–0	Barry Switzer
1975	Ohio State	11–1	Woody Hayes
1976	USC	11–1	John Robinson
1977	Texas	11–1	Fred Akers
1978	USC	12–1	John Robinson
1979	Alabama	12–0	Paul "Bear" Bryant
1980	Georgia	12–0	Vince Dooley
1981	Clemson	12–0	Danny Ford
1982	Nebraska	12–1	Tom Osborne
1983	Nebraska	12–1	Tom Osborne
1984	Washington	11–1	Don James
1985	Oklahoma	11–1	Barry Switzer
1986	Oklahoma	11–1	Barry Switzer
1987	Florida State	11–1	Bobby Bowden
1988	Miami (FL)	11–1	Jimmy Johnson
1989	Notre Dame	12–1	Lou Holtz

Contemporaneous

Season	Champion(s)	Record	Coach
1990	Colorado	11–1–1	Bill McCartney
1991	Washington	12–0	Don James
1992	Alabama	13–0	Gene Stallings
1993	Florida State	12–1	Bobby Bowden
1994	Nebraska	13–0	Tom Osborne
1995	Nebraska	12–0	Tom Osborne
1996	Florida	12–1	Steve Spurrier
1997	Nebraska	13–0	Tom Osborne
1998	Tennessee	13–0	Phillip Fulmer
1999	Florida State	12–0	Bobby Bowden
2000	Oklahoma	13–0	Bob Stoops
2001	Miami (FL)	12–0	Larry Coker
2002	Ohio State	14–0	Jim Tressel
2003	Oklahoma	12–2	Bob Stoops
2004	USC	11–0	Pete Carroll
2005	Texas	13–0	Mack Brown
2006	Florida	13–1	Urban Meyer
2007	LSU	12–2	Les Miles
2008	Florida	13–1	Urban Meyer
2009	Alabama	14–0	Nick Saban
2010	Auburn	14–0	Gene Chizik
2011	Alabama	12–1	Nick Saban

== See also ==
- NCAA Division I FBS national football championship
