= Bud Toscani =

American football player (1909–1966)

Profile
- Position: Halfback

Personal information
- Born: April 19, 1909; California, U.S.
- Died: June 21, 1966 (aged 57); Reno, Nevada, U.S.
- Listed height: 5 ft 8 in (1.73 m)
- Listed weight: 168 lb (76 kg)

Career information
- High school: Santa Rosa (CA)
- College: St. Mary's (CA)

Career history
- Chicago Cardinals (1932); Brooklyn Dodgers (1932)

Awards and highlights
- Second-team All-American (1931); First-team All-PCC (1931)

Francis Anthony "Bud" Toscani (April 19, 1909 – June 21, 1966) was an American football player.

== Career ==
A native of California, Toscani attended Santa Rosa High School in Santa Rosa, California, and Saint Mary's College of California in Moraga, California. While attending Saint Mary's, he played college football for the Saint Mary's Gaels Football Team. He scored the game-winning touchdown against USC in 1931, running 55 yards after catching a pass. He was selected by the Newspaper Enterprise Association (NEA) as a second-team halfback on the 1931 College Football All-America Team. He also played professional football in the National Football League (NFL) in 1932 for the Chicago Cardinals and the Brooklyn Dodgers. He appeared in four games for the Dodgers and three for the Cardinals.

== Personal life ==
He was married in 1933 to Leonore Slusser. He died in 1966 in Reno, Nevada.
