= Stan Williamson =

Biographical details
- Born: February 19, 1909; Pittsburg, California, U.S.
- Died: August 17, 1965 (aged 56); Santa Barbara, California, U.S.

Playing career
- 1929–1931: USC
- Position: Center

Coaching career (HC unless noted)
- 1933: Classen HS (OK)
- 1934: Oklahoma City
- 1935–1939: Kansas State (line)
- 1940: Oklahoma (line)
- 1941–1948: Santa Barbara State / Santa Barbara
- 1952–1955: Santa Barbara

Administrative career (AD unless noted)
- 1962–1965: UC Santa Barbara

Head coaching record
- Overall: 33–46–3 (college)
- Bowls: 1–0

Accomplishments and honors

Championships
- National (1931)

Awards
- First-team All-American (1931); First-team All-PCC (1931)

Stanley Lewis Williamson (February 19, 1909 – August 17, 1965) was an American football player and coach and college athletic administrator. He served as the head football coach at Oklahoma City University in 1934 and at Santa Barbara College of the University of California—now known as the University of California, Santa Barbara—from 1941 to 1948 and again from 1952 to 1955, compiling a career college football coaching record of 33–46–3. Williamson was also the athletic director at UC Santa Barbara from 1962 until 1965. He attended University of Southern California, where he played college football as a center for the USC Trojans and was the captain of Howard Jones's national championship-winning 1931 USC Trojans football team. Williamson died on August 17, 1965, at St. Francis Hospital in Santa Barbara, California, from a malignant brain tumor.

== Head coaching record ==
=== College ===
| Year | Team | Overall | Conference | Standing | Bowl/playoffs |
|---|---|---|---|---|---|
Oklahoma City Goldbugs (Independent) (1934)
| 1934 | Oklahoma City | 1–8 | | | |
| Oklahoma City: | | 1–8 | | | |
Santa Barbara State / Santa Barbara Gauchos (California Collegiate Athletic Association) (1941–1948)
| 1941 | Santa Barbara State | 3–5–1 | 1–2 | 3rd | |
| 1942–45 | No team—World War II | | | | |
| 1946 | Santa Barbara | 2–6 | 0–4 | 5th | |
| 1947 | Santa Barbara | 4–3–1 | 1–3–1 | 5th | |
| 1948 | Santa Barbara | 6–5 | 2–3 | T–3rd | W Potato Bowl |
Santa Barbara Gauchos (California Collegiate Athletic Association) (1952–1954)
| 1952 | Santa Barbara | 8–2 | 3–1 | 2nd | |
| 1953 | Santa Barbara | 2–6–1 | 1–4 | T–5th | |
| 1954 | Santa Barbara | 4–5 | 1–3 | 4th | |
Santa Barbara Gauchos (Independent) (1955)
| 1955 | Santa Barbara | 3–6 | | | |
| Santa Barbara State / Santa Barbara: | | 32–38–3 | 9–19–1 | | |
| Total: | | 33–46–3 | | | |
