= Poling System =

US college football team ranking system

Richard Raymond Poling
- Born: March 1, 1908; Mansfield, Ohio
- Died: August 2, 1994 (aged 86); Mansfield, Ohio
- Known for: College football ratings

The Poling System was a mathematical rating system used to rank college football teams. Its selections were published in the Football Review Supplement and several newspapers. The system was developed by Richard R. Poling (1908–1994), a native of Mansfield, Ohio who had played college football at Ohio Wesleyan University.

The Poling System is considered by the NCAA to have been a "major selector" of national championships for the years 1935–1984.

== Champions ==
The Poling System named contemporary champions from 1935 to 1984 and retroactively named champions from 1924 to 1934.

| Season | Champion(s) | Record | Coach |
|---|---|---|---|
Retrospective selections
| 1924 | Notre Dame | 10–0 | Knute Rockne |
| 1925 | Alabama | 10–0 | Wallace Wade |
| 1926 | Alabama | 9–0–1 | Wallace Wade |
| 1927 | Georgia | 9–1 | George Cecil Woodruff |
| 1928 | Georgia Tech | 10–0 | William Alexander |
| 1929 | Notre Dame | 9–0 | Knute Rockne |
| 1930 | Notre Dame | 10–0 | Knute Rockne |
| 1931 | USC | 10–1 | Howard Jones |
| 1932 | USC | 10–0 | Howard Jones |
| 1933 | Michigan | 7–0–1 | Harry Kipke |
| 1934 | Alabama | 10–0 | Frank Thomas |
Poling's Football Ratings
| 1935 | Minnesota | 8–0 | Bernie Bierman |
| 1936 | Minnesota | 7–1 | Bernie Bierman |
| 1937 | Pittsburgh | 9–0–1 | Jock Sutherland |
| 1938 | Tennessee | 11–0 | Robert Neyland |
| 1939 | Texas A&M | 11–0 | Homer Norton |
| 1940 | Stanford | 10–0 | Clark Shaughnessy |
| 1941 | Minnesota | 8–0 | Bernie Bierman |
| 1942 | Georgia | 11–1 | Wally Butts |
| 1943 | Notre Dame | 9–1 | Frank Leahy |
| 1944 | Army | 9–0 | Earl Blaik |
| 1945 | Army | 9–0 | Earl Blaik |
| 1946 | Army | 9–0–1 | Earl Blaik |
| 1946 | Notre Dame | 8–0–1 | Frank Leahy |
| 1947 | Michigan | 10–0 | Fritz Crisler |
| 1948 | Michigan | 9–0 | Bennie Oosterbaan |
| 1949 | Notre Dame | 10–0 | Frank Leahy |
| 1950 | Princeton | 9–0 | Charley Caldwell |
| 1951 | Michigan State | 9–0 | Biggie Munn |
| 1952 | Georgia Tech | 12–0 | Bobby Dodd |
| 1953 | Notre Dame | 9–0–1 | Frank Leahy |
| 1954 | Ohio State | 10–0 | Woody Hayes |
| 1955 | Oklahoma | 11–0 | Bud Wilkinson |
| 1956 | Oklahoma | 10–0 | Bud Wilkinson |
| 1957 | Auburn | 10–0 | Ralph Jordan |
| 1958 | LSU | 11–0 | Paul Dietzel |
| 1959 | Syracuse | 11–0 | Ben Schwartzwalder |
| 1960 | Missouri | 11–0 | Dan Devine |
| 1961 | Ohio State | 8–0–1 | Woody Hayes |
| 1962 | USC | 11–0 | John McKay |
| 1963 | Texas | 11–0 | Darrell Royal |
| 1964 | Arkansas | 11–0 | Frank Broyles |
| 1965 | Michigan State | 10–1 | Duffy Daugherty |
| 1966 | Notre Dame | 9–0–1 | Ara Parseghian |
| 1967 | Oklahoma | 10–1 | Chuck Fairbanks |
| 1968 | Ohio State | 10–0 | Woody Hayes |
| 1969 | Texas | 11–0 | Darrell Royal |
| 1970 | Arizona State | 11–0 | Frank Kush |
| 1971 | Nebraska | 13–0 | Bob Devaney |
| 1972 | USC | 12–0 | John McKay |
| 1973 | Michigan | 10–0–1 | Bo Schembechler |
| 1973 | Ohio State | 10–0–1 | Woody Hayes |
| 1974 | Oklahoma | 11–0 | Barry Switzer |
| 1975 | Ohio State | 11–1 | Woody Hayes |
| 1976 | Pittsburgh | 12–0 | Johnny Majors |
| 1977 | Notre Dame | 11–1 | Dan Devine |
| 1978 | Oklahoma | 11–1 | Barry Switzer |
| 1979 | Alabama | 12–0 | Paul "Bear" Bryant |
| 1980 | Georgia | 12–0 | Vince Dooley |
| 1981 | Clemson | 12–0 | Danny Ford |
| 1982 | Penn State | 11–1 | Joe Paterno |
| 1983 | Nebraska | 12–1 | Tom Osborne |
| 1984 | BYU | 13–0 | LaVell Edwards |
