= Byron Gentry =

American football player (1913–1992)

No. 18
- Position: Guard

Personal information
- Born: October 20, 1913; Brawley, Arkansas, U.S.
- Died: February 10, 1992 (aged 78); Paso Robles, California, U.S.

Career information
- College: USC

Career history
- Pittsburgh Pirates (1937–1939)

Awards and highlights
- First-team All-Pro (1938); 2× Pro Bowl (1938, 1939); 2× National champion (1931, 1932)

Career statistics
- Games played: 25
- Games started: 24
- Stats at Pro Football Reference

Byron Burk Gentry (October 20, 1913 – February 10, 1992) was an American professional football guard in the National Football League (NFL). He played three seasons for the Pittsburgh Pirates.

Gentry played college football at the University of Southern California where he was also a member of Phi Kappa Tau fraternity. At USC, he played on the 1931 and 1932 Rose Bowl championship teams. He was a decorated soldier, rising to the rank of Capitan, and serving as an intelligence officer in World War II. He later was a state and national commander of the Veterans of Foreign Wars. Gentry's post-football career was in the law and he was city attorney of Pasadena, California for sixteen years. He was also a published writer and poet.
