= 1932 Rose Bowl =

American college football game

- 18th Rose Bowl Game; National Championship Game (Note: Through luck and fortuitous scheduling, a "national championship game" was occasionally able to settle the matter on the field, as described in some contemporaneous reports. Despite the promotional billing, in several instances there were plausible scenarios for a third team to be selected as national champion by the major selectors, depending on outcomes of other games.) (Note: Title game for the Albert Russel Erskine Trophy and for the Dickinson System's Knute Rockne Memorial Trophy.)
USC Trojans	Tulane Green Wave
(9–1)	(11–0)
PCC	SoCon
21	12
Head coach: Howard Jones	Head coach: Bernie Bierman
	1	2	3	4	Total
USC	0	7	14	0	21
Tulane	0	0	6	6	12
- Date: January 1, 1932
- Season: 1931
- Stadium: Rose Bowl Stadium
- Location: Pasadena, California
- MVP: Erny Pinckert (HB) – USC
- Attendance: 75,562

The 1932 Rose Bowl was the 18th Rose Bowl game, an American post-season college football game that was played on New Year's Day 1932 in Pasadena, California. It featured the Tulane Green Wave against the USC Trojans. The Trojans had six All-Americans in their lineup: tackle Ernie Smith, guards Johnny Baker and Aaron "Rosy" Rosenberg, halfback Erny Pinckert and quarterbacks Orville Mohler and Gaius Shaver.

The game was a true national championship game, with Tulane ranked No. 1 and USC No. 2 in the preliminary ballot of the Erskine poll of 250 sportswriters. It was decided that their matchup in the Rose Bowl would determine the result. The Albert Russel Erskine Trophy was presented to victorious USC on the field following the game. The Dickinson System's Knute Rockne Memorial Trophy also went to the winner of the game.

== Background ==
Tulane won all eleven games of the regular season, shutting their opponents out seven times while allowing just 35 total points on the season to win the Southern Conference for the third straight year. Captain for the team was Jerry Dalrymple, the only unanimous All-American in the country that year.

USC started their season with a loss to Saint Mary's in Los Angeles. However, they won the next nine games to prevail as champions of the Pacific Coast Conference for the fourth time in five seasons, having six shutouts (notably scoring 69 on Montana and 60 on Georgia).

== Game summary ==
To protect his kidney injury, Tulane captain Jerry Dalrymple wore a special pad during the game. It was reported that USC captain Stan Williamson told the referee to allow Dalrymple as much time as he needed to adjust the pad during a timeout in the name of sportsmanship.

=== Second quarter ===
- USC – Ray Sparling, 5-yard run (Baker kick good) 9:34 7-0 USC

=== Third quarter ===
- USC – Erny Pinckert, 30-yard run (Baker kick good) 12:26 14-0 USC
- USC – Erny Pinckert, 23-yard run (Baker kick good) 8:32 21-0 USC
- Tul – Haynes, 15-yard pass from Don Zimmerman (Don Zimmerman kick failed) 2:56 21-6 USC

=== Fourth quarter ===
- Tul – Wop Glover, 2-yard run (Point after failed) 9:34 21-12 USC
