= 1931 All-Big Six Conference football team =

The 1931 All-Big Six Conference football team consists of American football players chosen by various organizations for All-Big Six Conference teams for the 1931 college football season. The selectors for the 1931 season included the Associated Press (AP).

== All-Big Six selections ==
=== Ends ===
- Henry Cronkite, Kansas State (AP-1; UP-1)
- Smith Watkins, Oklahoma (UP-1)
- Harold Templeton, Iowa State (AP-2; UP-2)

=== Tackles ===
- Hugh Rhea, Nebraska (AP-1; UP-1)
- Otto Rost, Kansas (AP-1; UP-1)
- Foy, Kansas (UP-1)
- James Gilbert, Nebraska (AP-2; UP-2)
- Kenneth Kerby, Missouri (AP-2)
- Gordon Graalman, Oklahoma (UP-2)

=== Guards ===
- George Koster, Nebraska (AP-1; UP-1)
- Adolph Hraba, Kansas State (AP-1; UP-2)
- Charles Teel, Oklahoma (AP-2; UP-2)
- Walter Zeckser, Kansas State (AP-2)

=== Centers ===
- Paul Young, Oklahoma (AP-1; UP-2)
- Nagel, Iowa State (UP-1)
- Lawrence Ely, Nebraska (AP-2)

=== Quarterbacks ===
- Charles Schiele, Missouri (AP-1; UP-2)
- McMillan, Kansas State (UP-1)
- Roger Bowen, Iowa State (AP-2)

=== Halfbacks ===
- Elden Auker, Kansas State (AP-1; UP-1)
- Ralph Graham, Kansas State (AP-1; UP-2)
- Dick Grefe, Iowa State (UP-1)
- Everett Kreizinger, Nebraska (AP-2; UP-2)
- George M. Stuber, Jr. Missouri (AP-2)
- Henry Bauer, Nebraska (UP-2)

=== Fullbacks ===
- George Sauer, Nebraska (AP-1; UP-1)
- Carnie Smith, Kansas (AP-2; UP-2)

== Key ==
AP = Associated Press
UP = United Press

== See also ==
- 1931 College Football All-America Team
