= Newport Sports Museum =

Museum in Newport Beach, California, United States

Coordinates: 33°36′46″N 117°52′38″W

The Newport Sports Museum was a sports museum in Newport Beach, California, United States. It closed in 2014.

== Collection ==
The Newport Sports Museum owned over 10,000 items of sports memorabilia including items from football, baseball, basketball, hockey and golf. The museum also had an Olympic collection. Notable items included Babe Ruth's last home run ball which is signed, Wayne Gretzky's 900th goal puck, the Albert Russel Erskine Trophy, and hundreds of game worn and autographed jerseys from all sports.

== History ==
The Newport Sports Museum was started in 1953 when, at the age of 12 years, John W. Hamilton was given a signed football from the Look All-American Football Team. Hamilton’s collection was reported to be one of the largest displays of sports memorabilia ever assembled. In 1995, Hamilton along with several athletes, decided to open the museum. The collection was housed in a Newport Center office building owned by Hamilton, a commercial real estate developer.

Hamilton announced the museum's closing in April 2014. The decision came shortly after the museum suffered the loss of a number of valuable baseballs in a nighttime burglary. Hamilton cited his health and the costs of upkeep as reasons for his decision. The building was burglarized again in May 2014, just before an auction began to sell off many of the items in the collection.
