= Henry Cronkite =

American football player (1911–1949)

Profile
- Positions: End (football), Center (basketball)

Personal information
- Born: March 15, 1911; Oklahoma, U.S.
- Died: December 27, 1949 (aged 38); Wichita, Kansas, U.S.

Career information
- College: Kansas State College

Awards and highlights
- First-team All-American (1931); 2× First-team All-Big Six (1930, 1931); Kansas State Athletics Hall of Fame (1995)

Henry Oliver "High" Cronkite (March 15, 1911 – December 27, 1949) was an American collegiate athlete. A 6'5" giant of his era, Cronkite was best known as a football player, as which he was regarded as both a strong tackler and adept offensive receiver playing the End position for the Kansas State Aggies football team.

Cronkite was named an All-American at his position following the 1931 season. After teaching school for two years after graduation, Cronkite played football professionally in 1934 for the Brooklyn Dodgers of the National Football League (NFL), starting two times in a brief six game career.

A three-sport athlete, Cronkite also earned All-Conference honors as a center for the Kansas State basketball team and was a letterman on the school's track and field team.

In 1995, Cronkite was inducted into the Kansas State Athletics Hall of Fame.

== Biography ==
=== Early life ===
Henry Oliver Cronkite was born March 15, 1911. He attended grade school at Hutchinson, Kansas.

=== College career ===
Cronkite, known by the nicknames "High Henry" and "Doc," played college football at the end position for the Kansas State Aggies team. He earned football letters as a starter for the team in the 1929, 1930, and 1931 seasons.

Cronkite took a pass for a 78-yard touchdown in the 1930 game on the road against the Nebraska Cornhuskers that was key in the Aggies' 10–9 victory that ended a 14-game losing streak against their fellow Midwestern rivals. In a meeting held in Lincoln immediately after the Cornhusker game, Cronkite's teammates elected the 19-year old team captain for 1931. Cronkite was the youngest Kansas State player ever accorded such an honor.

Cronkite was selected by the United Press and Newspaper Enterprise Association as a first-team player on the 1931 College Football All-America Team.

The 6'5" Cronkite was a three-sport athletic star with the Aggies, also making his mark as an All-Big Six Conference center during the 1929–30 and 1930–31 basketball seasons and earning letters on the track team as a shot putter.

=== Professional career ===
For two years after graduating Kansas State College, Cronkite worked as a teacher at Glen Elder High School in Glen Elder, Kansas. However, the Chicago Cardinals of the National Football League came calling in June 1934, signing Cronkite to a contract to play for the team that fall, with Cronkite's seasonal commitment beginning with a three-week training camp starting September 1.

Cronkite scored a touchdown in his first game playing for the Cardinals, a 33–0 exhibition route of a team called the Chicago Tigers, played September 16, 1934.

High Henry was traded away by the Cardinals prior to the start of the 1934 regular season, however, with his contract transferred to the NFL's Brooklyn Dodgers late in September.

Cronkite caught a 20-yard scoring pass in his first game with the Dodgers, a 28–0 exhibition win over the semi-pro Bay Parkway eleven.

Cronkite would play a total of six games during his one-season career, starting twice. At 6'5", he was the tallest player in the National Football League during the 1934 season.

=== Later years and death ===
After retiring from professional football, Cronkite subsequently became an athletic coach, teaching at a series of high schools before landing at Abilene High School in Abilene, Kansas, where he was head football coach until standing down in 1947 and where he coached freshman basketball until the time of his death.

In November 1949, a cancerous tumor forced doctors to amputate Cronkite's left leg above the knee. Cronkite's condition was initially regarded as "good," and he was able to receive visitors after the surgery. Cronkite's condition soon worsened, however, and on December 27, 1949, he died at St. Francis Hospital in Wichita from complications of his surgery.

Cronkite was 38 years old at the time of his death. He was survived by a wife and three children.

== Awards ==
In 1995, Cronkite was inducted into the Kansas State Athletics Hall of Fame.
