= Albert Russel Erskine Trophy =

College football award

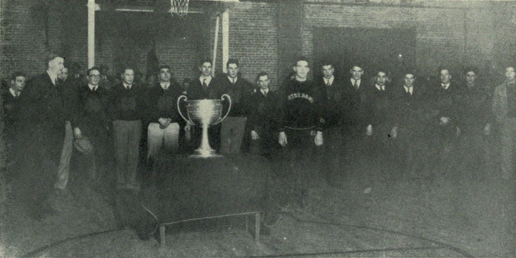
- Notre Dame receiving the Erskine Trophy following the 1929 season.
- Sport: College football
- Awarded for: National Championship
- Sponsored by: Albert Russel Erskine; Studebaker
- Country: United States
- Presented by: American Sportswriters

History
- First award: 1929
- Editions: 3
- Final award: 1931
- First winner: Notre Dame
- Most wins: Notre Dame (2); USC (1)
- Most recent: USC

The Albert Russel Erskine Trophy was an annual award presented in the United States from 1929 to 1931 to the college football team recognized as national champions by a group of American sportswriters.

== Trophy ==
The Erskine trophy is made of plate silver, in the form of a loving cup with two handles. It is inscribed with the words:

The Albert Russel Erskine Trophy for the National Football Championship as determined by American Sportswriters

The selected national champions for 1929, 1930, and 1931 are inscribed below, with room to spare for subsequent champions.

The trophy was last awarded immediately following the 1932 Rose Bowl. In later years the trophy was held by the Newport Sports Museum until its closure in 2014, after which the trophy was sold at auction.

== Winners ==
Season	Team	Head coach	Record
1929	Notre Dame	Knute Rockne	9–0
1930	Notre Dame	Knute Rockne	10–0
1931	USC	Howard Jones	10–1

For 1932, unbeaten Michigan was mentioned as receiving the "Rockne – Erskine trophy" in recognition of their title as national champions. No winner is engraved upon the Erskine Trophy for 1932.
