= Gaius Shaver =

American football player and coach (1910–1998)

Gaius "Gus" Shaver
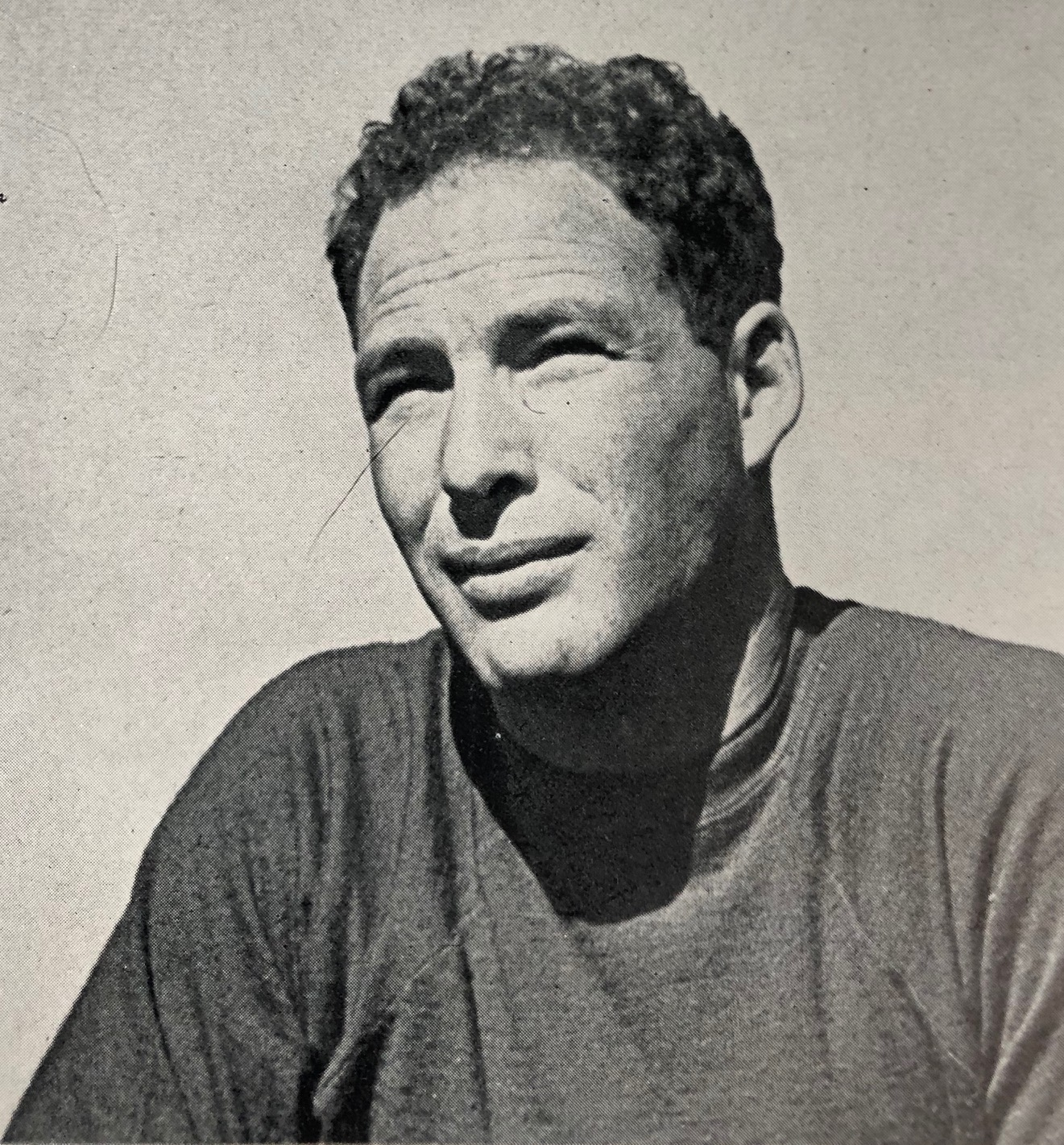

Profile
- Positions: Quarterback, Fullback

Personal information
- Born: August 14, 1910; Covina, California, U.S.
- Died: October 11, 1998 (aged 88); Fallbrook, California, U.S.

Career information
- College: USC

Awards and highlights
- National champion (1931); Consensus All-American (1931); First-team All-PCC (1931)

Gaius Ray "Gus" Shaver (August 14, 1910 – October 11, 1998) was an All-American football player. He played at the quarterback and fullback positions for the University of Southern California Trojans football teams from 1929 to 1931. He was a consensus All-American in 1931 and led the Trojans that year to a national championship. Shaver was also captain of the winning team and the leading rusher in American football at the 1932 Summer Olympic Games.

== Biography ==
=== Early life ===
Born in Covina, California, Shaver played three seasons at quarterback for the Covina High School football teams. He helped lead the Colts to state football championships in 1925 and 1926 and also held the school pole vault record at 12 feet 6 inches (3.81 m).

=== University of Southern California ===
Shaver enrolled at the University of Southern California in 1928 and played on coach Howard Jones "Thundering Herd" football teams from 1929 to 1931.

==== 1929 season ====
As a sophomore in 1929, Shaver played for the USC team that beat Pitt 47–14 in the 1930 Rose Bowl to finish the season with a record of 10–2.

==== 1931 season ====
In 1931, he was selected as a consensus All-American, as he led the Trojans to a 10–1 record and a national championship. The 1931 Trojans lost their opening game to St. Mary's College, but won the remaining ten games. When USC faced Notre Dame in 1931, Notre Dame was ranked No. 1 in the country and had won 26 consecutive games. Shaver scored two touchdowns, both in the fourth quarter, to lead USC to a 16–14 come-from-behind win in South Bend, Indiana. The game was the Trojans’ first win on Notre Dame's home field. Shaver later recalled that, after the game in South Bend, the USC team visited the grave of Notre Dame's former coach Knute Rockne (who had died earlier in the year) to pay their respects. When the team returned to Los Angeles, the city conducted a parade from Los Angeles City Hall to the USC campus in the team's honor. At the time, the Los Angeles Times wrote: "No conquering army of ancient Rome ever received a more tumultuous welcome."

The Trojans advanced the 1932 Rose Bowl, defeating Tulane 21–12. Shaver led the Trojans in rushing for the 1931 season with 936 yards.

=== Olympic Games ===
When the Summer Olympic Games came to Los Angeles in 1932, the organizers chose American football as the "demonstration sport." All-Stars from Eastern universities were matched against All-Stars from the universities of the Pacific Coast. The game was played at the Los Angeles Memorial Coliseum in August 1932, and the West team won by a score of 7–6. The game was attended by 60,000 spectators. Shaver was the captain of the West team and the game's leading rusher with 145 yards on 16 attempts. After the game, the Los Angeles Times wrote: "It remained for a spectacle listed on the program as 'American Football' to provide the Tenth Olympiad with its greatest thrill to date. Chances are the game will become an international pastime before the memory of this night game dies away." American football has not been included in any Olympic games since the 1932 games in Los Angeles.

=== Later years and family ===
Shaver returned to USC as an assistant football coach from 1940 to 1945. He later worked as a salesman of construction equipment. In 1975, Shaver retired and moved from his home in Irvine, California, to a ranch north of Fallbrook, California, in San Diego County. Shaver and his wife, Stella, began raising oranges and tangerines on the 40-acre (160,000 m^{2}) ranch in the 1950s.

Shaver was married to Stella Marie Chrisman. They had two children, Karen Shaver and Gaius John Shaver. In 1998, Shaver died of natural causes at his home in Fallbrook. He was age 88 and had been in failing health since suffering cardiac arrest in 1991.
