= Erny Pinckert =

American football player (1907–1977)

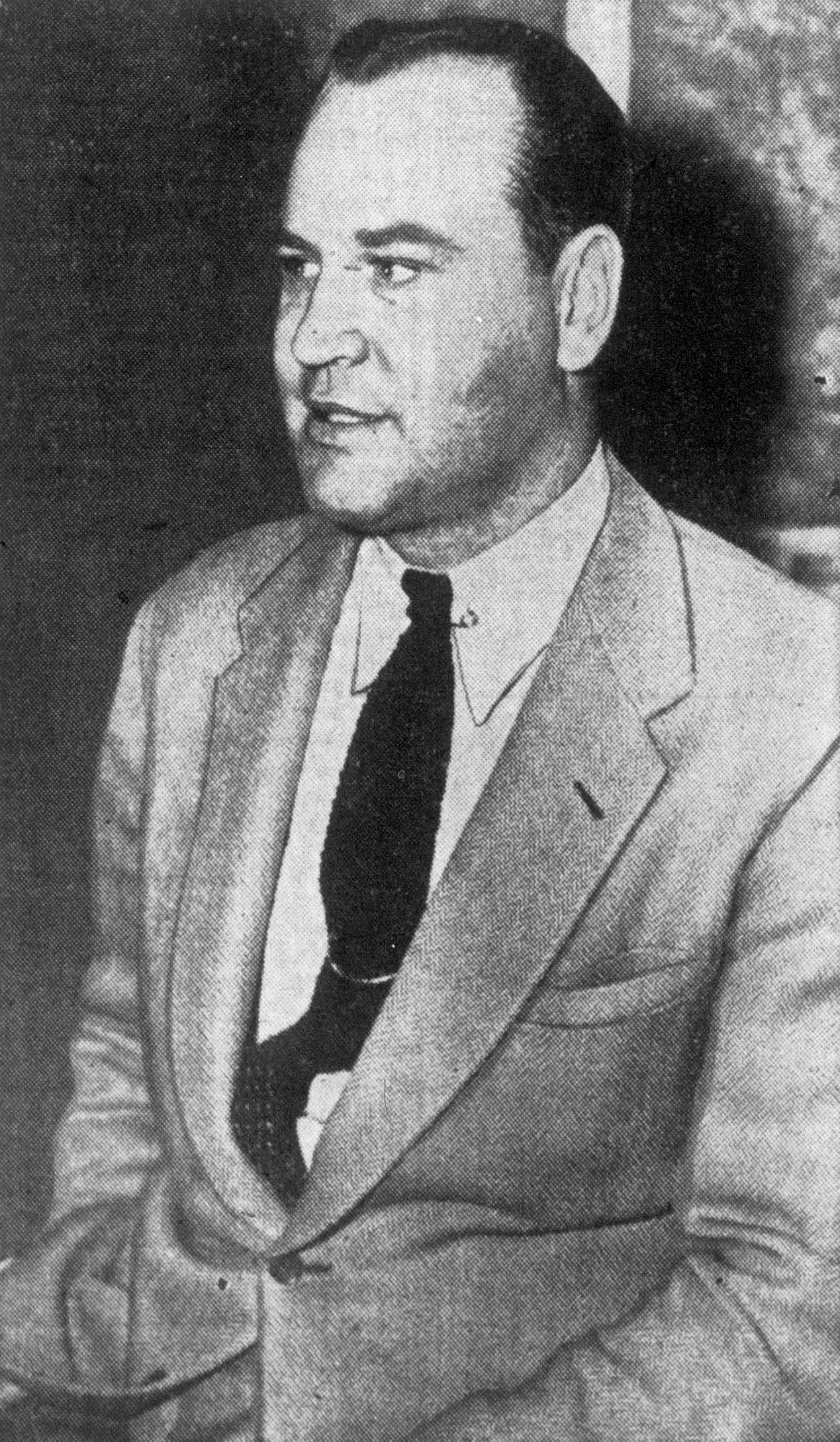
- Pinckert, circa 1943

No. 11
- Position: Halfback

Personal information
- Born: May 1, 1907; Medford, Wisconsin, U.S.
- Died: August 30, 1977 (aged 70); Los Angeles, California, U.S.
- Listed height: 6 ft 0 in (1.83 m)
- Listed weight: 197 lb (89 kg)

Career information
- High school: San Bernardino (CA)
- College: Southern California

Career history
- Boston Braves / Boston Redskins / Washington Redskins (1932–1940)

Awards and highlights
- NFL champion (1937); 2× Pro Bowl (1938, 1939); National champion (1931); Consensus All-American (1930); First-team All-American (1931); 2× First-team All-PCC (1930, 1931)

Career NFL statistics
- Games played: 97
- Starts: 72
- Total offensive yards: 927
- Interceptions: 2
- Touchdowns: 3
- Stats at Pro Football Reference
- College Football Hall of Fame

William Ernest Pinckert (May 1, 1907– August 30, 1977) was an American football halfback. He played college football at the University of Southern California (USC) under head coach Howard Jones. Pinckert played professionally in the National Football League (NFL) from 1932 to 1940 with the Boston Braves/Redskins, who then moved to Washington, D.C. Pinckert was inducted into the College Football Hall of Fame in 1957.

== Early life ==
A younger brother of astrologer Jeane Dixon, Pinckert and his nine siblings were the children of Richard Franz Pinckert, a native of Gräfenhainichen, Wittenberg, Saxony-Anhalt, and his wife, Luise Johanne Emma (née Graefe), both Roman Catholics.

== College career ==
Pinckert was consensus selection on the 1930 College Football All-America Team. Tommy Trojan, officially known as the Trojan Shrine was based on a variety of USC football players, including Russ Saunders and Pinckert. The lower half in particular is based on Ernie Pinckert.

== Professional career ==
Pinckert played in the NFL between 1932 and 1940 for the Boston Braves and the Washington Redskins.

== Death ==
Pinckert died on August 30, 1977, at his home in the West Los Angeles neighborhood of Los Angeles.
