= 1931 All-America college football team =

Official list of the best college football players of 1931

The 1931 All-America college football team is composed of college football players who were selected as All-Americans by various organizations and writers who chose All-America college football teams in 1931. The seven selectors recognized by the NCAA as "official" for the 1931 season are (1) Collier's Weekly, as selected by Grantland Rice, (2) the Associated Press, (3) the United Press, (4) the All-America Board, (5) the International News Service (INS), (6) Liberty magazine, and (7) the Newspaper Enterprise Association (NEA).

== Consensus All-Americans ==
Following the death of Walter Camp in 1925, there was a proliferation of All-American teams in the late 1920s. For the year 1931, the NCAA recognizes seven published All-American teams as "official" designations for purposes of its consensus determinations. The following chart identifies the NCAA-recognized consensus All-Americans and displays which first-team designations they received. The only unanimous All-America selections in 1931 were Tulane's Gerald "Jerry" Dalrymple and Notre Dame's Marchmont Schwartz.

Name	Position	School	Number	Selectors
Jerry Dalrymple	End	Tulane	7/7	AAB, AP, COL, INS, LIB, NEA, UP
Marchmont Schwartz	Halfback	Notre Dame	7/7	AAB, AP, COL, INS, LIB, NEA, UP
Biggie Munn	Guard	Minnesota	6/7	AAB, AP, COL, INS, NEA, UP
Pug Rentner	Halfback	Northwestern	6/7	AAB, AP, COL, INS, NEA, UP
Johnny Baker	Guard	USC	5/7	AAB, INS, LIB, NEA, UP
Barry Wood	Quarterback	Harvard	4/7	AP, COL, INS, NEA
Gaius Shaver	Fullback	USC	4/7	AAB, COL, LIB, UP
Jess Quatse	Tackle	Pittsburgh	3/7	AAB, COL, UP
Jack Riley	Tackle	Northwestern	3/7	AAB, LIB, NEA
Tommy Yarr	Center	Notre Dame	3/7	AAB, AP, INS
Vernon Smith	End	Georgia	2/7	AP, COL
Dallas Marvil	Tackle	Northwestern	2/7	AP, INS

== Proliferation of All-American teams ==
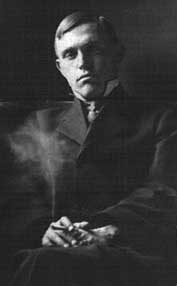
Damon Runyon described the proliferation of All-American teams as a virulent plague.

In 1931, Damon Runyon wrote a column about the proliferation of "All-America" teams. He noted: "The 'All' boys are it, tooth and nail. They are 'All'-ing North, South East, and West. They will wind up 'All'-Americaing, the most virulent form of the 'All' plague that besets us every Winter. The late Walter Camp little realized what he was bringing upon the country. ... At the moment, Mr. Camp probably had no idea that he was sowing the seed of a fearful pestilence." Runyon noted that Camp's word was viewed as gospel. Still, with his passing "the rush to fill his shoes was prodigious," and the "'All' business became a national obsession."

== All-Americans of 1931 ==
=== Ends ===
- Jerry Dalrymple, Tulane (AP–1; UP–1; COL–1; CP–1; NEA–1; INS–1; WCFF; LIB; HSM; CH-1; LP; AAB)
- Vernon Smith, Georgia (AP-1; COL–1; NEA–2; INS–2; HSM; CP–1; CH-2; LP; UP-2)
- Henry Cronkite, Kansas State (AP–2; UP–1; NEA–1; INS-2; CP–3; CH-1)
- John Orsi, Colgate (AP–2; CP–2; NEA–2; INS-1; WCFF; CH-2; AAB)
- Paul Moss, Purdue (NEA–3; INS-3l CP–2; LIB; UP-3)
- George Koontz, SMU (CP-3)
- Bill Hewitt, Michigan (NEA-3)
- Garrett Arbelbide, USC (AP-3)
- Fred Felber, North Dakota (AP-3)
- Herster Barres, Yale (INS-3)
- Ray Sparling, USC (UP-2)
- Ralph Stone, California (UP-3)

=== Tackles ===
- Dallas Marvil, Northwestern (AP–1; NEA–3; INS-1; CP–1; CH-2; HSM; UP-2)
- Jesse Quatse, Pittsburgh (UP–1; COL–1; CP-2; WCFF; CH-1; AAB)
- Jack Riley, Northwestern (NEA–1; INS-2; WCFF; AAB; LIB)
- Paul Schwegler, Washington (AP–1; COL–1; INS-3; CP–2; UP-3)
- Joe Kurth, Notre Dame (AP–2; UP–1; NEA–1; INS–2; CP–3; LIB; LP)
- John "Jack" Price, Army (AP–3; CP–1; NEA–2; INS-1; CH-2; UP-3)
- Jim MacMurdo, Pittsburgh (AP–2; NEA–3; INS-3; HSM)
- Ira Hardy, Harvard (NEA–2; CH-1; LP)
- Hugh Rhea, Nebraska (AP-3)
- Ray Saunders, Tennessee (CP-3)
- Richard Tozer, California (UP-2)

=== Guards ===
- Biggie Munn, Minnesota (AP–1; UP–1; COL–1; NEA–1; INS–1; CP–1; HSM; CH-1; LP; WCFF; AAB)
- Johnny Baker, USC (AP–2; UP–1; NEA–1; INS–1; CP–2; WCFF; LIB; HSM; CH-2; LP; AAB)
- Herman Hickman, Tennessee (AP–3; COL–1; NEA–3; INS-3; CP–1; CH-1; UP-2)
- Frank "Nordy" Hoffman, Notre Dame (AP-1; NEA–2; INS-2; LIB)
- Joe Zeller, Indiana (NEA-2)
- Jim Zyntell, Holy Cross (CP-2)
- James Evans, Northwestern (AP–2; CP-3)
- Maurice Dubofsky, Georgetown (NEA-3)
- Greg Kabat, Wisconsin (AP–3; CP-3)
- Milton Leathers, Georgia (INS-2; UP-3)
- H. R. Myerson, Harvard (INS-3)
- Bill Corbus, Stanford (CH-2; UP-2)
- Aaron Rosenberg, USC (UP-3)

=== Centers ===
- Tommy Yarr, Notre Dame (AP–1; NEA–2; INS-1; WCFF; HSM; CH-2; AAB; UP-2)
- Maynard Morrison, Michigan (AP–3; COL–1; NEA-1; CP–3)
- Ralph Daugherty, Pittsburgh (AP–2; NEA–3; INS–3; CP–1; LP; UP-3)
- Ookie Miller, Purdue (UP-1; CH-1)
- Stan Williamson, USC (LIB)
- Clarence Gracey, Vanderbilt (CP-2)
- McDuffie, Columbia (INS-2)

=== Quarterbacks ===
- Barry Wood, Harvard (AP–1; COL–1; NEA–1; INS-1; CP–1; HSM; CH-2; UP-3)
- Austin Downes, Georgia (UP-2; CP-3)
- Bill Morton, Dartmouth (AP–2; NEA–2; INS-3; CH-1)
- Carl Cramer, Ohio State (AP-3)

=== Halfbacks ===
- Marchmont Schwartz, Notre Dame (College Football Hall of Fame) (AP–1; UP–1; COL–1; NEA–1; INS–1; WCFF; LIB; HSM; CH-1; LP; AAB)
- Ernie Rentner, Northwestern (College Football Hall of Fame) (AP-1; UP–1; COL–1; NEA–1; INS–1 [named as fullback by Hearst]; CP–1; WCFF; HSM [named as fullback]; CH-1; LP; AAB)
- Don Zimmerman, Tulane (AP–2; NEA–2; INS-1; CP–1; CH-2; UP-2)
- Bob Monnett, Michigan State (CP-1)
- Eugene McEver, Tennessee (AP–2; NEA–2; INS-2; CP–2; UP-3)
- Bud Toscani, St. Mary's (NEA-2)
- Cornelius Murphy, Fordham (CP-3; CH-2) {Murphy died from a ruptured blood vessel in the brain in December 1931}
- J. W. Crickard, Harvard (NEA-3)
- Albert J. "Mighty Atom" Booth, Jr., Yale (AP–3; INS-2)
- Weldon Mason, SMU (AP-3; UP-3)
- Ray Stecker, Army (UP-2; INS-3)

=== Fullbacks ===
- Gaius Shaver, USC (COL–1 [selected as fullback]; UP–1 [selected as quarterback]; NEA–3 [selected as quarterback]; INS–2 [selected as quarterback]; CP–1 [selected as fullback]; WCFF [selected as quarterback]; LIB; LP [selected as quarterback]; AAB)
- Erny Pinckert, USC (College Football Hall of Fame) (AP–1; NEA–1; INS–3 [picked as halfback]; LIB; HSM [named as halfback]; CH-1; UP-3)
- Johnny Cain, Alabama (UP–1; NEA–3 [picked as halfback]; INS-3; WCFF; CH-2; AAB)
- Ralston "Rusty" Gill, California (NEA–3; LIB; LP; UP-2)
- Orville Mohler, USC (AP-3; CP-2 [picked as quarterback])
- Jack Manders, Minnesota (CP-2)
- Bart Viviano, Cornell (AP-2)
- Clarke Hinkle, Bucknell (INS-2)
- Nollie Felts, Tulane (CP-3)

== Key ==
Bold – Consensus All-American

=== Selectors recognized by the NCAA in consensus determinations ===
- AAB = All America Board
- AP = Associated Press
- COL = Collier's Weekly as selected by Grantland Rice
- INS = International News Service, the wire service of the Hearst newspapers
- LIB = Liberty magazine
- NEA = Newspaper Enterprise Association
- UP = United Press

=== Other selectors ===
- CP = Central Press Association, also known as the Captain's Poll, selected by a poll of the captains of the major football teams
- WCFF = Walter Camp Football Foundation
- HSM = All-American team selected by 18,006 fans through nationwide contest sponsored by clothier Hart, Schaffner and Marx
- CH = College Humor magazine
- LP = selected by Lawrence Perry, a former Princetonian who wrote a nationally syndicated sports column called For The Game's Sake

== See also ==
- 1931 All-Big Six Conference football team
- 1931 All-Big Ten Conference football team
- 1931 All-Pacific Coast Conference football team
- 1930 All-Southern football team
- 1931 All-Southwest Conference football team
