= Johnny Baker (guard) =

American football player and coach (1907–1979)

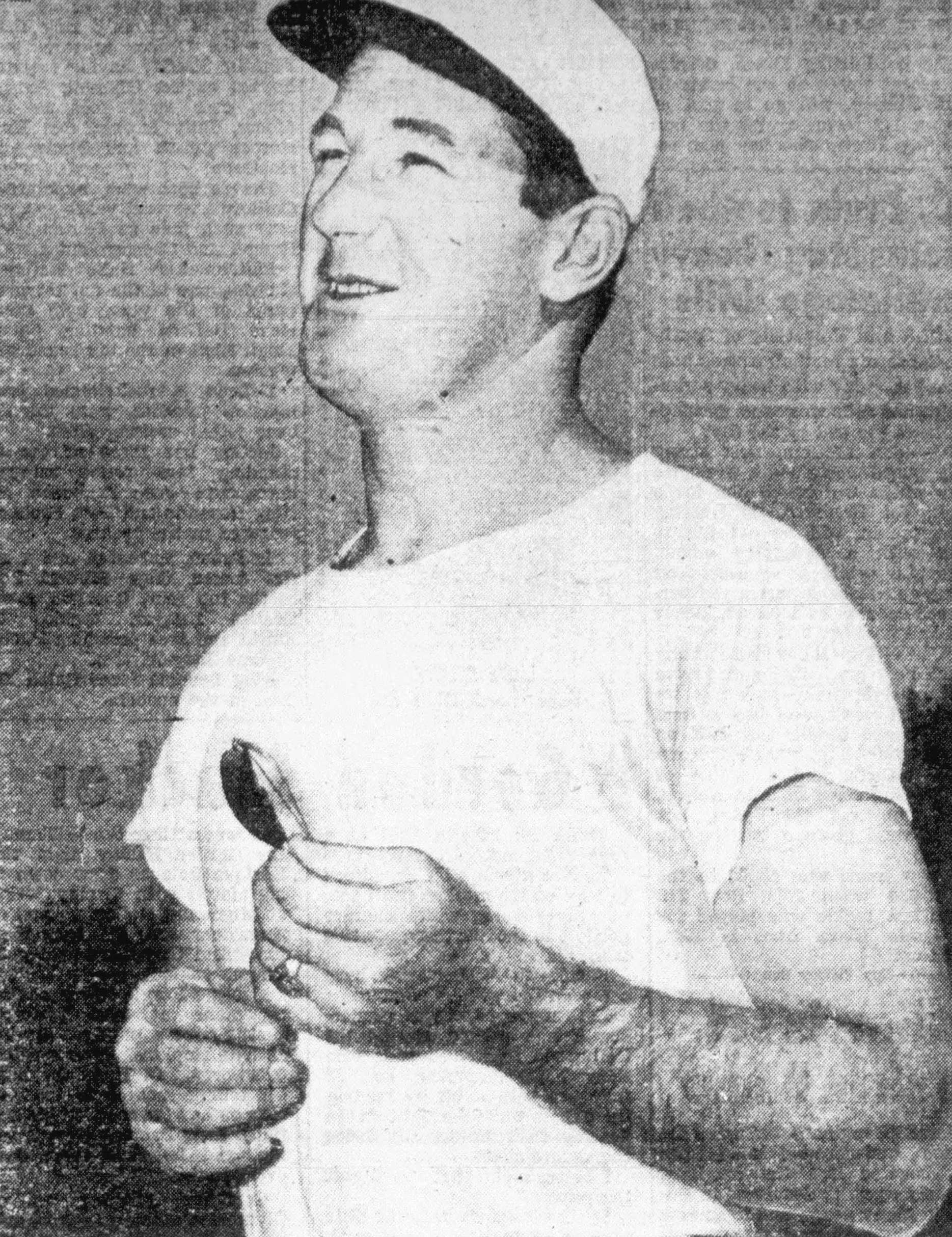
- Baker, c. 1945

Biographical details
- Born: August 14, 1907; Denison, Iowa, U.S.
- Died: February 6, 1979 (aged 71); Sacramento, California, U.S.

Playing career

Football
- 1929–1931: USC
- Position: Guard

Coaching career (HC unless noted)

Football
- 1933–1934: Iowa State Teachers
- 1935–1937: Omaha (line)
- 1938–1941: Grant Union HS (CA)
- 1942: Sacramento Junior College
- 1945: Fourth Air Force
- 1946: Los Angeles Dons (line)
- 1947: Denver (line)
- 1948–1952: Denver
- 1953–1956: Washington (assistant)
- 1957–1960: Sacramento State

Basketball
- 1935–1938: Omaha

Administrative career (AD unless noted)
- 1957–1967: Sacramento State

Head coaching record
- Overall: 47–64–5 (college football)
- Bowls: 1–0

Accomplishments and honors

Awards
- Consensus All-American (1931); Second-team All-American (1930); 2× First-team All-PCC (1930, 1931)
- College Football Hall of Fame; Inducted in 1983 (profile)

John W. "Bake" Baker (August 14, 1907 – February 6, 1979) was an American football player and coach. He played college football at the University of Southern California, where he was a two-time All-American at guard. Baker served as the head football coach at Iowa State Teachers College—now known as the University of Northern Iowa—from 1933 to 1934, the University of Denver from 1948 to 1952, and Sacramento State College—now known as California State University, Sacramento—from 1957 to 1960, compiling a career college football head coaching record of 41–61–4. He was inducted into the College Football Hall of Fame as a player in 1983.

== Playing career ==
Baker earned varsity letters at USC in 1929, 1930, and 1931. He played in the 1930 and the 1932 Rose Bowl, kicking five points after touchdowns. He kicked the winning 33-yard field goal with one minute to go in USC's game against the Notre Dame in 1931. It was USC's first victory in South Bend. Baker was an all-conference first-teamer in 1930 and 1931 and was invited to participate in a demonstration game of American football at the 1932 Summer Olympics, but he declined. At USC, Baker was initiated as a member of Phi Kappa Tau fraternity.

== Coaching career ==
After leaving USC, Baker coached football at Iowa State Teachers College, the University of Omaha, the University of Denver, Sacramento State College, University of Washington, and Sacramento City College. He was also the athletic director at Sacramento State.

Baker was the head football coach at Grant Union High School in Sacramento, California from 1938 to 1941. He was hired as the head football coach at Sacramento Junior College—now known as Sacramento City College in 1942, succeeding Harry Applequist.

== Death and honors ==
Baker died of cancer on February 6, 1979, at a hospital in Sacramento.

Baker was inducted into the Fresno County Athletic Hall of Fame in 1961, the College Football Hall of Fame in 1983, the University of Southern California Athletics Hall of Fame in 1997, and the Phi Kappa Tau Hall of Fame in 2006.

== Head coaching record ==
=== Football ===
Year	Team	Overall	Conference	Standing	Bowl/playoffs
Iowa State Teachers Panthers (Iowa Conference) (1933–1934)
1933	Iowa State Teachers	3–6	2–2	6th	
1934	Iowa State Teachers	3–3–2	1–0–2	4th	
Iowa State Teachers:		6–9–2	3–2–2		
Fourth Air Force Flyers (Army Air Forces League) (1945)
1945	Fourth Air Force	6–3–1	3–2–1	3rd	W Legion Bowl
Fourth Air Force:		6–3–1	3–2–1		
Denver Pioneers (Skyline Six / Skyline Conference) (1948–1952)
1948	Denver	4–5–1	2–2	3rd	
1949	Denver	4–6	2–2	3rd	
1950	Denver	3–8–1	2–2–1	3rd	
1951	Denver	6–4	4–3	3rd	
1952	Denver	3–7	0–7	8th	
Denver:		20–30–2	10–16–1		
Sacramento State Hornets (Far Western Conference) (1957–1960)
1957	Sacramento State	5–4	2–3	4th	
1958	Sacramento State	3–6	1–4	6th	
1959	Sacramento State	2–7	1–4	5th	
1960	Sacramento State	5–5	2–3	T–3rd	
Sacramento State:		15–22	6–14		
Total:		47–64–5			
