= 1931 All-Pacific Coast football team =

American all-star college football team

The 1931 All-Pacific Coast football team consists of American football players chosen by various organizations for All-Pacific Coast teams for the 1931 college football season. The organizations selecting teams in 1934 included the Associated Press (AP), the Newspaper Enterprise Association, and the United Press (UP).

== All-Pacific Coast selections ==
=== Quarterback ===
- Gaius Shaver, USC (AP-1; UP-1)
- Orville Mohler, USC (NEA-1)

=== Halfbacks ===
- Bud Toscani, St. Mary's (AP-1; UP-1)
- Erny Pinckert, USC (AP-1; NEA-1; UP-1) (College Football Hall of Fame)
- Merle Hufford, Washington (NEA-1)

=== Fullback ===
- Ralston "Rusty" Gill, California (AP-1; NEA-1; UP-1)

=== Ends ===
- Ralph Stone, California (AP-1; NEA-1; UP-1)
- Leonard Wellendorf, UCLA (AP-1)
- Ray Sparling, USC (UP-1)
- Garrett Arbelbide, USC (NEA-1)

=== Tackles ===
- Paul Schwegler, Washington (AP-1; NEA-1; UP-1) (College Football Hall of Fame)
- Ernie Smith, USC (AP-1)
- Bill Morgan, Oregon (UP-1)
- Turk Edwards, Washington State (NEA-1) (College and Pro Football Halls of Fame)

=== Guards ===
- Johnny Baker, USC (AP-1; NEA-1; UP-1) (College Football Hall of Fame)
- Bill Fisher, St. Mary's (AP-1; UP-1)
- Bill Corbus, Stanford (NEA-1) (College Football Hall of Fame)

=== Centers ===
- Stan Williamson, USC (AP-1; NEA-1; UP-1)

== Key ==
AP = Associated Press

NEA = Newspaper Enterprise Association, "picked by votes of sports writers on western NEA Service newspapers"

UP = United Press

Bold = Consensus first-team selection by at least two of the AP, NEA and UP

== See also ==
- 1930 College Football All-America Team
