= Ernie Smith (tackle) =

American football player (1909–1985)

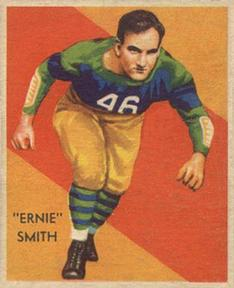

No. 45, 61
- Positions: Tackle, placekicker

Personal information
- Born: November 26, 1909; Spearfish, South Dakota, U.S.
- Died: April 25, 1985 (aged 75); Los Angeles, California, U.S.
- Listed height: 6 ft 2 in (1.88 m)
- Listed weight: 224 lb (102 kg)

Career information
- High school: Gardena (Los Angeles)
- College: USC

Career history
- Green Bay Packers (1935–1939)

Awards and highlights
- First-team All-Pro (1936); Second-team All-Pro (1937); Pro Bowl (1939); 2× NFL champion (1936) (1939); 2× National champion (1931, 1932); Unanimous All-American (1932); 2× First-team All-PCC (1931, 1932); All-Time USC Football Team

Career statistics
- Games played: 40
- Starts: 25
- Stats at Pro Football Reference
- College Football Hall of Fame

Ernest Frederick Smith (November 26, 1909 – April 25, 1985) was an American professional football player for the Green Bay Packers of the National Football League (NFL). He played college football for the USC Trojans, earning All-American honors. Smith was a two-time All-Pro with the Packers. He was inducted into he College Football Hall of Fame.

== Early life ==
Smith was born in 1909 in Spearfish, South Dakota, and played scholastically at Gardena High School in Los Angeles. He attended the University of Southern California, graduating in 1933. While there, he was a member of Phi Sigma Kappa fraternity, the Sigma Sigma honorary fraternity, and the Alpha Eta Rho aviation fraternity. He was also a member of the Spirit of Troy as a trombone player. He also appeared in 85 movies, including a credited role in That's My Boy (1932).

== Football career ==
=== College ===
Smith was a tackle under coach Howard Jones at the University of Southern California (USC). He also handled the placekicking and kickoff duties. He played prominent roles in the Trojan Rose Bowl triumphs over Tulane University as a junior and against University of Pittsburgh as a senior. He was selected as a unanimous All-American in 1932.

=== Coaching ===
Smith was assistant football coach at Southern California, working with the freshman team from 1933 to 1934.

=== Minor leagues ===
Smith played with the Southern California Maroons of the Pacific Coast Pro Football League (PCPFL) in 1934. In 1938, he left the pros to play for the Hollywood Stars of the PCPFL because this was closer to his home in Los Angeles.

=== Green Bay Packers ===
In 1935, Smith signed with Curly Lambeau and played professionally from 1935 to 1939 for the Green Bay Packers. He was selected for the first-team All-Pro in 1936 and the second-team All-Pro in 1937. After leaving to play in the minor leagues in 1938, he returned for a final season with the Green Bay Packers in 1939. That year, his team won another title and Smith set a National Football League Championship Game record for the longest field goal; this record of a 42-yard shot held until 1951 when it was broken by Lou Groza.

Despite he success as a professional football player, the profession did not provide a living salary at the time. He played two exhibition games with the Green Bay Packers om 1940 but then retired.

== Awards and honors ==
Smith was elected to the College Football Hall of Fame in 1970. In 2001, Athlon Sports named Smith to the All-Time USC Football Team as a defensive lineman.

== Personal life ==
In August 1934, Smith married Ruth Foster Bradford of Los Angeles. After college, he became an insurance underwriter, a career that he returned to after football and for a total of 53 years. During World War II, Smith was a major in the United States Air Force between 1940 and 1945.

He worked with the Boy Scouts and was an officer of the Southern California Symphony. He also was on the Rose Bowl Committee and was president of the Los Angeles chapter of the National Football Foundation.

He died in 1985 in Los Angeles at the age of 85 years.
