= Howard Jones (American football coach) =

American football player and coach (1885–1941)

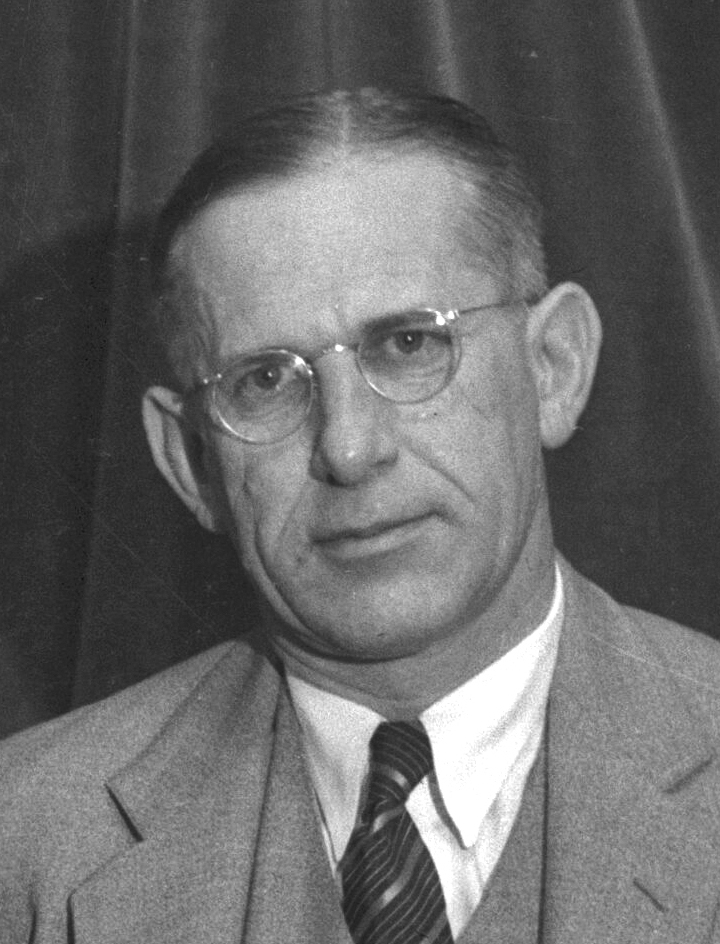
- Jones, c. 1936

Biographical details
- Born: August 23, 1885; Excello, Ohio, U.S.
- Died: July 27, 1941 (aged 55); Toluca Lake, California, U.S.

Playing career

Football
- 1905–1907: Yale

Coaching career (HC unless noted)

Football
- 1908: Syracuse
- 1909: Yale
- 1910: Ohio State
- 1913: Yale
- 1916–1923: Iowa
- 1924: Duke
- 1925–1940: USC

Baseball
- 1919: Iowa
- 1923–1924: Duke

Administrative career (AD unless noted)
- 1917–1924: Iowa

Head coaching record
- Overall: 194–64–21 (football); 41–14 (baseball)
- Bowls: 6–0

Accomplishments and honors

Championships
- Football; 6 national (1909, 1921, 1928, 1931–1932, 1939); 2 Big Ten (1921–1922); 7 PCC (1927–1929, 1931–1932, 1938–1939)
- College Football Hall of Fame; Inducted in 1951 (profile)

Howard Harding Jones (August 23, 1885 – July 27, 1941) was an American football player and coach who served as the head coach at Syracuse University (1908), Yale University (1909, 1913), Ohio State University (1910), the University of Iowa (1916–1923), Duke University (1924) and the University of Southern California (1925–1940), compiling a career record of 194–64–21. His 1909 Yale team, 1921 Iowa team, and four of his USC teams (1928, 1931, 1932, 1939) won national championships. Jones coached USC in five Rose Bowls, winning all of them. Before coaching, Jones played football at Yale (1905–1907), where he played on three national title-winning teams. He was a member of the inaugural class of inductees into the College Football Hall of Fame as a coach in 1951; his younger brother, Tad, joined him as a member in 1958.

== Early life and playing career ==
Jones was born in Excello, Ohio, near Middletown. He played football for three seasons at Yale University, from 1905 to 1907. During his three years, the Yale Bulldogs never lost a game, going 28–0–2. Yale claims national championships for all three seasons.

== Coaching career ==
=== Syracuse, Yale and Ohio State ===
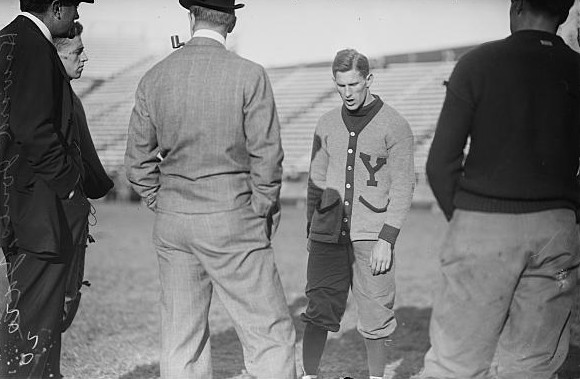

After graduating in 1908, Jones became the head coach at Syracuse University on the advice of Walter Camp, leading the Orangemen to a 6–3–1 record before returning to Yale as the head coach. He led Yale to a 10–0 record in 1909, a season in which Yale claims another national championship. Yale's 15–0 victory over Syracuse in 1909 was significant in that it was the first time that two brothers had ever faced each other as opposing head coaches. Syracuse was then coached by Howard Jones's brother, Tad Jones.

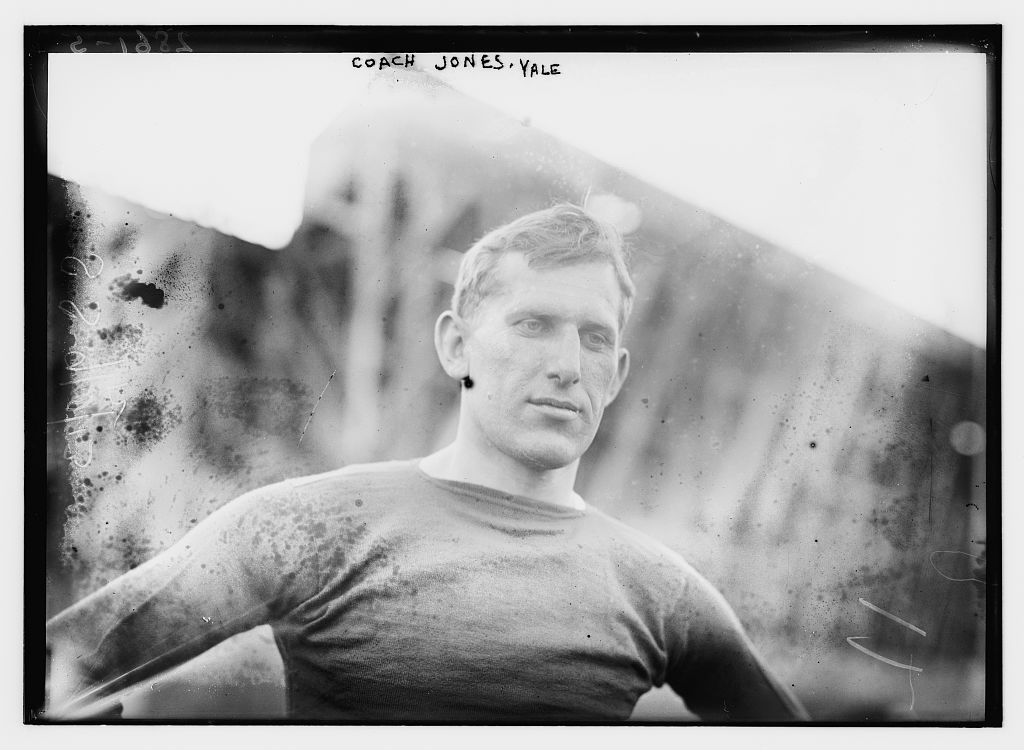
Jones in 1913

After the 1909 season, Howard Jones served a one-year stint as head football coach at Ohio State University in 1910, leading the Buckeyes to a 6–1–3 record. Jones spent four of his next five years in private business, returning only to coach Yale to a 5–2–3 record in 1913. A lack of team talent drove him toward greener pastures, and he would eventually enjoy great success at the University of Iowa and the University of Southern California.

=== Iowa ===
Reed Lane, a businessman on the Iowa Athletic Board, was a classmate of Jones's when they both attended a Yale preparatory school. When Jesse Hawley left after the 1915 season, Iowa offered Jones a contract to become Iowa's 11th head football coach on the recommendation of Lane. Jones accepted a five-year contract at $4,500 annually, the longest commitment and most money ever offered to a coach at Iowa.

Jones's first two years were highlighted by a 67–0 loss to Minnesota in 1916 and a 47–0 loss to Nebraska in 1917. Jones vowed he would never lose by such scores again, and he did not; they remained the two worst losses of his career. In 1918, Iowa defeated Minnesota for the first time in school history. It would be the first of five straight wins over Minnesota for Jones, and three over Nebraska.

The loss of Fred Becker hurt Iowa during that time. Becker was Iowa's first first team All-American as a sophomore in 1916. He could have been a potential star for Jones, but he played just one season before enlisting for the service with the outbreak of World War I. Becker was killed in combat just ten months after being named an All-American.

World War I altered the college football landscape. Eligibility rules were relaxed in the Big Ten Conference in 1918. Iowa's athletic director also left to serve in the war, so Jones was appointed to that position as well. Iowa's game with Coe College in 1918 was played with no fans in the stands, as public officials feared a flu epidemic. Iowa reportedly won, 27–0. In 1918 and 1919, Iowa fell just short of the Big Ten title, with losses to Illinois costing the Hawkeyes the crown in both seasons. Jones also coached the Iowa baseball team in 1919. In 1920, Iowa had the top two scorers in the Big Ten and finished with a 5–2 record.

Still, Iowa had not won a conference title in 21 years. All that changed in 1921, when Iowa finished with a perfect 7–0 record and won the Big Ten title outright. The most notable win of the season was a 10–7 triumph over Notre Dame. It was Jones's first meeting with Notre Dame coach Knute Rockne. The win snapped a 20-game winning streak for Rockne and Notre Dame, which would be the longest winning streak of Rockne's career. One of the criticisms fans had of the previous Iowa coach, Hawley, was that he could not convince talented Iowa players to play at Iowa. Jones succeeded in that respect; the 1921 Hawkeyes started 11 native Iowans.

Despite the graduations of many key players, Iowa again posted a perfect 7–0 final record in 1922. Iowa again went 5–0 in the Big Ten, capturing its second straight Big Ten crown. It is the only time in Iowa history that the Hawkeyes have won consecutive conference titles. The most notable win of the 1922 season was a victory over Yale, then coached by Howard's brother, Tad. It was the first time a "western" team had ever defeated Yale in New Haven. Iowa's winning streak from 1920–1923 under Jones lasted 20 games and almost three full years.

Howard Jones's wife was not fond of Iowa City, and he demanded a new contract, which would allow him to coach and live in Iowa City only during football season. A conflict between Jones and the chairman of the Athletics Board at Iowa contributed to the tension, and Jones eventually resigned as head coach and athletic director at Iowa.

== Duke and USC ==
Jones coached in 1924 at Trinity College, now known as Duke University, before leaving for USC in 1925. In 16 seasons at USC, Jones coached seven Pacific Coast Conference championship teams and four more national champions, and won each of the five Rose Bowls in which his Trojans played . In the 1920s, USC won two Rose Bowls, in 1923 and 1930. Heading into the 1930 Rose Bowl, USC had defeated its crosstown rival UCLA 76–0 in their first meeting.

Moments before a USC-Stanford game, Jones visited the Stanford locker room and discovered Stanford All-American halfback Bobby Grayson was nursing an injured knee. Jones returned to the USC quarters and instructed his players to avoid hitting Grayson in the crippled leg. They never did.

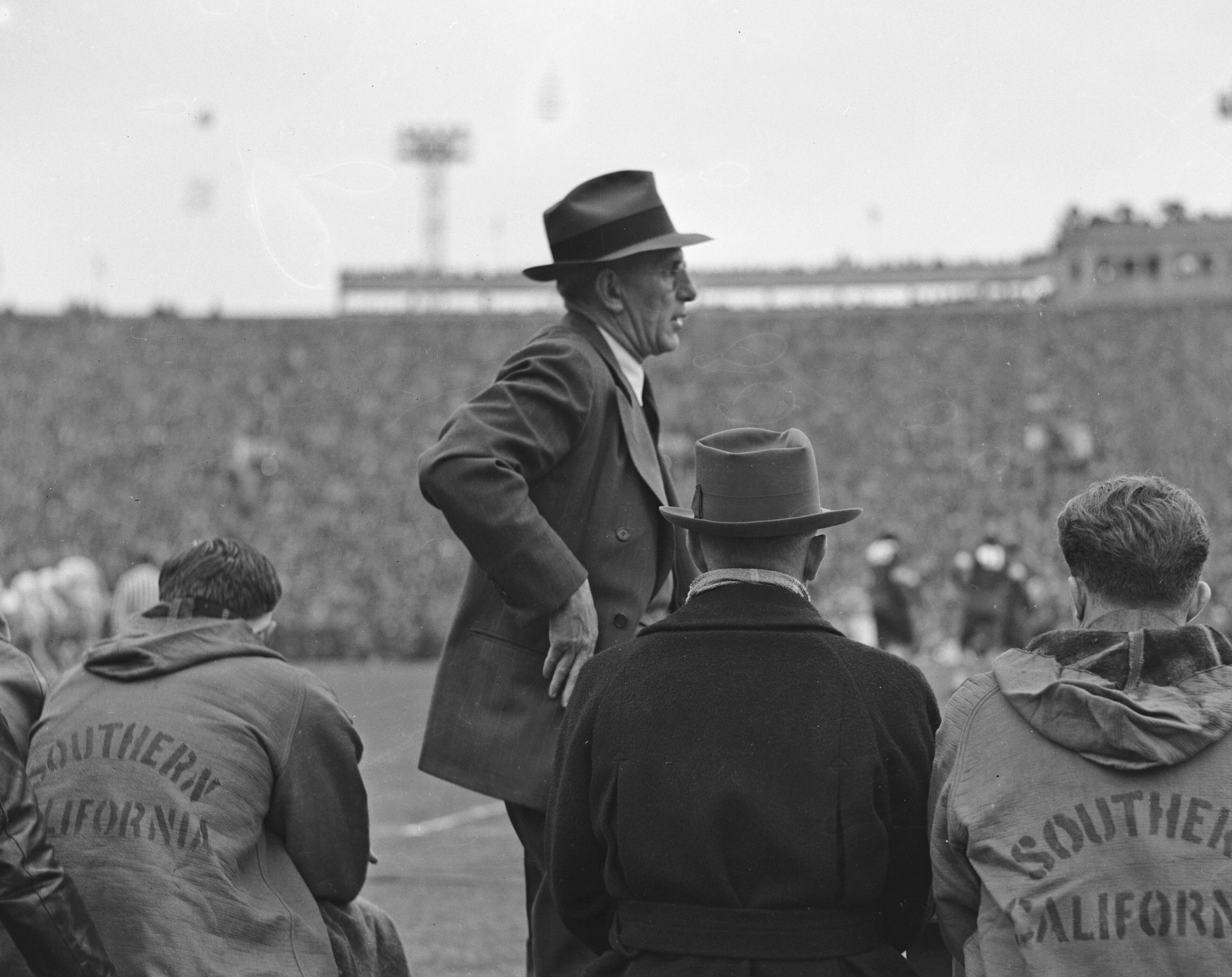
Jones coaching the Trojans during the 1939 Rose Bowl.

In 1939 and 1940, Jones's teams again won the Rose Bowl. In those two Rose Bowl games, USC faced teams that were unbeaten, untied and unscored-upon. First it was Duke, which led after an early fourth quarter 23-yard field goal by Tony Ruffa, but backup USC quarterback Doyle Nave completed four straight passes to "Antelope" Al Krueger who outmaneuvered Eric "The Red" Tipton, scoring the winning touchdown with one minute remaining. Krueger's touchdown marked the first points scored against Duke during the season. In the 1940 Rose Bowl, the Trojans defeated the Tennessee Volunteers 14–0, ending a 23-game Tennessee winning streak and scoring the first points scored against the Volunteers all season.

USC historian Al Wesson remarked, "Howard lived and breathed football. If it were not for football, he would have starved to death – couldn't possibly have made a living in business."

One of the players Jones coached while at USC was legendary film star John Wayne.

Wesson also recalled, "His assistants tried to get him to organize the practices and let them do most of the heavy work. He'd promise to do it, but after 15 minutes on the field, he'd be down on the ground showing them personally how to block, following every play on the dead run, and acting as though he were still playing end at Yale. He just couldn't relax and let others do the heavy work."

Jones lived in Toluca Lake, California. On the hot morning of July 27, 1941, while home alone and washing and waxing his car, Jones fell ill and called his doctor, who lived nearby. By the time he arrived, Jones was dead; he had suffered a heart attack. The sudden, unexpected death was a shock to family, friends and fans: Several thousand people attended his funeral at First Methodist Church in Hollywood. He was buried in Woodside Cemetery & Arboretum at Middletown, Ohio.

== Coaching style and personality ==
"If you'd just made a good play and were coming off the field, [Jones] wasn't the type to pat you on the back, shake your hand or say something. He just gave you that look, just a hint of a smile, and you'd know if he was happy."
— Ray George on Jones's coaching personality.

Jones was known for being completely absorbed in the sport and aloof outside of it. While he and Notre Dame's Knute Rockne were the two most famous coaches in America in the 1930s, beyond football their personalities were completely different: Rockne was a natural showman, Jones was a terrible public speaker and humorless. His appearance, described as "stone-faced" and "severe-looking" kept him intimidating.

Though quiet off the field, when coaching, Jones was intimidating and energetic. Although his players and assistant coaches had a hard time relating to him, all had absolute confidence in his abilities. While admired for his integrity and scruples, Jones's formidable personality led him to be an authoritarian coach at times, and he did not tolerate discussion. Jones did not like spending time on recruiting, relying mostly on his assistants, and recruited only very few players. His assistants Bob McNeish, Hobbs Adams and Jeff Cravath are credited with bringing in the players who enabled USC to win two more Rose Bowls after lean years in the mid-1930s.

== Honors ==
All told, Jones's career record was 194–64–21, a .733 winning percentage, in over 28 seasons at Syracuse, Yale, Ohio State, Iowa, Duke and Southern California.

The USC–Ohio State game on October 5, 1946 was designated as the Howard Jones Memorial Game in honor of the late Trojan and Buckeye coach. The dedication was intended to drive funding to build a "Howard Jones Memorial Fieldhouse and Armory" on campus at the University of Southern California.

Jones was a member of the College Football Hall of Fame's inaugural class of inductees in 1951.

== Head coaching record ==
=== Football ===
| Year | Team | Overall | Conference | Standing | Bowl/playoffs | AP^{#} |
|---|---|---|---|---|---|---|
Syracuse Orange (Independent) (1908)
| 1908 | Syracuse | 6–3–1 | | | | |
| Syracuse: | | 6–3–1 | | | | |
Yale Bulldogs (Independent) (1909)
| 1909 | Yale | 10–0 | | | | |
Ohio State Buckeyes (Ohio Athletic Conference) (1910)
| 1910 | Ohio State | 6–1–3 | 5–1–2 | T–3rd | | |
| Ohio State: | | 6–1–3 | 5–1–2 | | | |
Yale Bulldogs (Independent) (1913)
| 1913 | Yale | 5–2–3 | | | | |
| Yale: | | 15–2–3 | | | | |
Iowa Hawkeyes (Western Conference / Big Ten Conference) (1916–1923)
| 1916 | Iowa | 4–3 | 1–2 | 6th | | |
| 1917 | Iowa | 3–5 | 0–2 | T–8th | | |
| 1918 | Iowa | 6–2–1 | 2–1 | T–4th | | |
| 1919 | Iowa | 5–2 | 2–2 | 6th | | |
| 1920 | Iowa | 5–2 | 3–2 | 5th | | |
| 1921 | Iowa | 7–0 | 5–0 | 1st | | |
| 1922 | Iowa | 7–0 | 5–0 | T–1st | | |
| 1923 | Iowa | 5–3 | 3–3 | T–5th | | |
| Iowa: | | 42–17–1 | 21–12 | | | |
Duke Blue Devils (Independent) (1924)
| 1924 | Duke | 4–5 | | | | |
| Duke: | | 4–5 | | | | |
USC Trojans (Pacific Coast Conference) (1925–1940)
| 1925 | USC | 11–2 | 3–2 | T–3rd | | |
| 1926 | USC | 8–2 | 5–1 | 2nd | | |
| 1927 | USC | 8–1–1 | 4–0–1 | T–1st | | |
| 1928 | USC | 9–0–1 | 4–0–1 | 1st | | |
| 1929 | USC | 10–2 | 6–1 | T–1st | W Rose | |
| 1930 | USC | 8–2 | 5–1 | 2nd | | |
| 1931 | USC | 10–1 | 7–0 | 1st | W Rose | |
| 1932 | USC | 10–0 | 6–0 | 1st | W Rose | |
| 1933 | USC | 10–1–1 | 4–1–1 | 3rd | | |
| 1934 | USC | 4–6–1 | 1–4–1 | 7th | | |
| 1935 | USC | 5–7 | 2–4 | 8th | W Poi | |
| 1936 | USC | 4–2–3 | 3–2–2 | 4th | | |
| 1937 | USC | 4–4–2 | 2–3–2 | 7th | | |
| 1938 | USC | 9–2 | 6–1 | T–1st | W Rose | 7 |
| 1939 | USC | 8–0–2 | 5–0–2 | 1st | W Rose | 3 |
| 1940 | USC | 3–4–2 | 2–3–2 | 7th | | |
| USC: | | 121–36–13 | 65–23–12 | | | |
| Total: | | 194–64–21 | | | | |
National championship Conference title Conference division title or championship game berth
^{#}Rankings from final AP Poll.
