= List of Western Kentucky Hilltoppers football seasons =

This is a list of seasons completed by the Western Kentucky college football program. The Hilltoppers represent the Western Kentucky University (WKU) in Conference USA. WKU plays its home games at Houchens Industries–L. T. Smith Stadium in Bowling Green, Kentucky.

== Seasons ==
Year	Team	Overall	Conference	Standing	Bowl/playoffs	Coaches^{#}	AP^{°}
M. A. Leiper & Roy C. Manchester (Independent) (1913)
1913	Leiper / Manchester	1–0					
Leiper / Manchester:		1–0					
J. L. Arthur (Independent) (1914–1916)
1914	J. L. Arthur	1–2					
1915	J. L. Arthur	1–4–2					
1916	J. L. Arthur	3–2					
J. L. Arthur:		5–8–2					
1917	No team						
1918	No team						
1919	No team						
L. T. Smith (Independent) (1920–1921)
1920	L. T. Smith	0–1					
1921	L. T. Smith	2–4–1					
L. T. Smith:		2–5–1					
Edgar Diddle (Independent) (1922–1925)
1922	Edgar Diddle	9–1					
1923	Edgar Diddle	5–4					
1924	Edgar Diddle	4–5					
1925	Edgar Diddle	3–5–1					
Edgar Diddle (Southern Intercollegiate Athletic Association) (1926–1928)
1926	Edgar Diddle	4–4–1	1–2–1	19th			
1927	Edgar Diddle	5–4	2–4	T–18th			
1928	Edgar Diddle	8–1	5–1	3rd			
Edgar Diddle:		38–24–2	7–6–1				
Carl Anderson (Southern Intercollegiate Athletic Association) (1929)
1929	Carl Anderson	7–3	3–3	T–16th			
James Elam (Southern Intercollegiate Athletic Association) (1930–1931)
1930	James Elam	8–1–1	6–1	6th			
1931	James Elam	8–4	7–1	4th			
James Elam:		16–5–1	13–2				
Ernest R. Miller (Southern Intercollegiate Athletic Association) (1932)
1932	Ernest R. Miller	8–1	6–0	1st			
Ernest R. Miller:		8–1	6–0				
Jesse Thomas (Southern Intercollegiate Athletic Association) (1933)
1933	Jesse Thomas	6–2	5–1				
Carl Anderson (Southern Intercollegiate Athletic Association) (1934–1937)
1934	Carl Anderson	4–2–2	4–1–1	T–6th			
1935	Carl Anderson	7–3	5–2	13th			
1936	Carl Anderson	4–4	3–2	T–14th			
1937	Carl Anderson	7–1–1	3–0–1	T–3rd			
Carl Anderson:		24–9–3	18–8–2				
Gander Terry (Southern Intercollegiate Athletic Association) (1934–1937)
1938	Gander Terry	7–2	4–1	T–8th			
1939	Gander Terry	7–1–1	5–1–1	T–5th			
1940	Gander Terry	7–1–1	4–1–1	T–5th			
1941	Gander Terry	4–5–1	3–1–1	T–6th			
Gander Terry:		25–9–3	16–4–3				
Arnold Winkenhofer (Kentucky Intercollegiate Athletic Conference) (1942)
1942	Arnold Winkenhofer	3–4–1	2–0–1	T–6th			
Arnold Winkenhofer:		3–4–1	2–0–1				
1943	No team						
1944	No team						
1945	No team						
Jesse Thomas (Kentucky Intercollegiate Athletic Conference) (1946–1947)
1946	Jesse Thomas	2–6	1–3				
1947	Jesse Thomas	3–4–2	1–3				
Jesse Thomas:		11–12–2	7–7				
Jack Clayton (Ohio Valley Conference) (1948–1956)
1948	Jack Clayton	5–4	2–3	5th			
1949	Jack Clayton	5–4	2–3	6th			
1950	Jack Clayton	6–2–2	3–1–2	2nd			
1951	Jack Clayton	4–5	2–4	6th			
1952	Jack Clayton	9–1	4–1	T–1st	W Refrigerator		
1953	Jack Clayton	6–4	2–3	4th			
1954	Jack Clayton	7–3	3–2	T–2nd			
1955	Jack Clayton	3–6	1–4	5th			
1956	Jack Clayton	5–4	2–3	T–3rd			
Jack Clayton:		50–33–2	21–24–2				
Nick Denes (Ohio Valley Conference) (1957–1967)
1957	Nick Denes	5–3–1	1–3–1	T–4th			
1958	Nick Denes	4–5	2–4	T–5th			
1959	Nick Denes	5–4	3–3	4th			
1960	Nick Denes	2–6–1	1–4–1	T–6th			
1961	Nick Denes	6–3	4–2	3rd			
1962	Nick Denes	5–3	3–3	5th			
1963	Nick Denes	10–0–1	7–0	1st	W Tangerine	8	
1964	Nick Denes	6–3–1	3–3–1	T–3rd			
1965	Nick Denes	2–6–2	1–5–1	7th			
1966	Nick Denes	5–5	3–4	6th			
1967	Nick Denes	7–1–1	5–1–1	2nd			
Nick Denes:		57–39–7	33–32–5				
Jimmy Feix (Ohio Valley Conference) (1968–1981)
1968	Jimmy Feix	7–2–1	5–2	T–2nd		17	19
1969	Jimmy Feix	6–3–1	5–2	2nd			
1970	Jimmy Feix	8–1–1	5–1–1	1st		9	12
1971	Jimmy Feix	8–2	6–1	1st		12	6
1972	Jimmy Feix	7–3	5–2	2nd			
1973	Jimmy Feix	12–1	7–0	1st	W Grantland Rice (NCAA Division II Semifinal); L Camellia (NCAA Division II Championship)	2	3
1974	Jimmy Feix	7–3	5–2	T–2nd			
1975	Jimmy Feix	11–2	6–1	T–1st	W Grantland Rice (NCAA Division II Semifinal); L Camellia (NCAA Division II Championship)	3	3
1976	Jimmy Feix	4–5–1	3–4	T–4th			
1977	Jimmy Feix	1–8–1	1–5–1	8th			
1978	Jimmy Feix	8–2	6–0	1st			T–4
1979	Jimmy Feix	5–5	3–3	4th			
1980	Jimmy Feix	9–1	6–1	1st			5
1981	Jimmy Feix	6–5	4–4	T–4th			
Jimmy Feix (Division I-AA independent) (1982–1983)
1982	Jimmy Feix	5–5					
1983	Jimmy Feix	2–8–1					
Jimmy Feix:		106–56–6	68–28–2				
Dave Roberts (Division I-AA independent) (1984–1988)
1984	Dave Roberts	2–9					
1985	Dave Roberts	4–7					
1986	Dave Roberts	4–6–1					
1987	Dave Roberts	7–4			L NCAA Division I-AA First Round		11
1988	Dave Roberts	9–4			L NCAA Division I-AA Quarterfinal		13
Dave Roberts:		26–30–1					
Jack Harbaugh (Division I-AA independent) (1989–1998)
1989	Jack Harbaugh	6–5					
1990	Jack Harbaugh	2–8					
1991	Jack Harbaugh	3–8					
1992	Jack Harbaugh	4–6					
1993	Jack Harbaugh	8–3					19
1994	Jack Harbaugh	5–6					
1995	Jack Harbaugh	2–8					
1996	Jack Harbaugh	7–4					
1997	Jack Harbaugh	10–2			L NCAA Division I-AA Quarterfinal		5
1998	Jack Harbaugh	7–4					19
Jack Harbaugh (Ohio Valley Conference) (1999–2000)
1999	Jack Harbaugh	6–5	4–3	T–3rd			
2000	Jack Harbaugh	11–2	7–0	1st	L NCAA Division I-AA Quarterfinal		5
Jack Harbaugh (Gateway Football Conference) (2001–2002)
2001	Jack Harbaugh	8–4	5–2	T–2nd	L NCAA Division I-AA First Round		12
2002	Jack Harbaugh	12–3	7–1	T–1st	W NCAA Division I-AA Championship		1
Jack Harbaugh:		91–68	22–6				
David Elson (Gateway Football Conference) (2003–2006)
2003	David Elson	9–4	5–2	T–3rd	L NCAA Division I-AA Quarterfinal		7
2004	David Elson	9–3	6–1	2nd	L NCAA Division I-AA First Round		11
2005	David Elson	6–5	4–3	T–4th			
2006	David Elson	6–5	4–3	T–4th			
David Elson (NCAA Division I FCS independent) (2007)
2007	David Elson	7–5					
David Elson (NCAA Division I FBS independent) (2008)
2008	David Elson	2–10					
David Elson (Sun Belt Conference) (2009)
2009	David Elson	0–12	0–8	9th			
David Elson:		39–43	19–17				
Willie Taggart (Sun Belt Conference) (2010–2012)
2010	Willie Taggart	2–10	2–6	9th			
2011	Willie Taggart	7–5	7–1	2nd			
2012	Willie Taggart	7–6 (Note: Willie Taggart departed WKU before the bowl game, which was coached by Lance Guidry.)	4–4	5th	L Little Caesars Pizza		
Willie Taggart:		16–20	13–11				
Bobby Petrino (Sun Belt Conference) (2013)
2013	Bobby Petrino	8–4	4–3				
Bobby Petrino:		8–4	4–3				
Jeff Brohm (Conference USA) (2014–2016)
2014	Jeff Brohm	8–5	4–4	T–3rd (East)	W Bahamas		
2015	Jeff Brohm	12–2	8–0	1st (East)	W Miami Beach		24
2016	Jeff Brohm	11–3 (Note: Jeff Brohm departed WKU before the bowl game, which was coached by Nick Holt.)	7–1	T–1st (East)	W Boca Raton		
Jeff Brohm:		30–10	19–5				
Mike Sanford Jr. (Conference USA) (2017–2018)
2017	Mike Sanford Jr.	6–7	4–4	T–3rd (East)	L Cure		
2018	Mike Sanford Jr.	3–9	2–6	T–6th (East)			
Mike Sanford Jr.:		9–16	6–10				
Tyson Helton (Conference USA) (2019–present)
2019	Tyson Helton	9–4	6–2	T–2nd (East)	W First Responder		
2020	Tyson Helton	5–7	4–3	3rd (East)	L LendingTree		
2021	Tyson Helton	9–5	7–1	1st (East)	W Boca Raton		
2022	Tyson Helton	9–5	6–2	T–2nd	W New Orleans		
2023	Tyson Helton	8–5	5–3	4th	W Famous Toastery		
2024	Tyson Helton	8–6	6–2	2nd	L Boca Raton		
2025	Tyson Helton	9–4	6–2	3rd	W New Orleans		
Tyson Helton:		57–36	40–15				
Total:		632–436–30 (.589)					
National championship Conference title Conference division title or championship game berth
^{†}Indicates Bowl Coalition, Bowl Alliance, BCS, or CFP / New Years' Six bowl.; ^{#}Coaches Poll.; ^{°}AP Poll prior to 1987, The Sports Network poll from 1987 through 2007, and the AP Poll from 2008 onwards.
