= List of Western Kentucky Hilltoppers head football coaches =

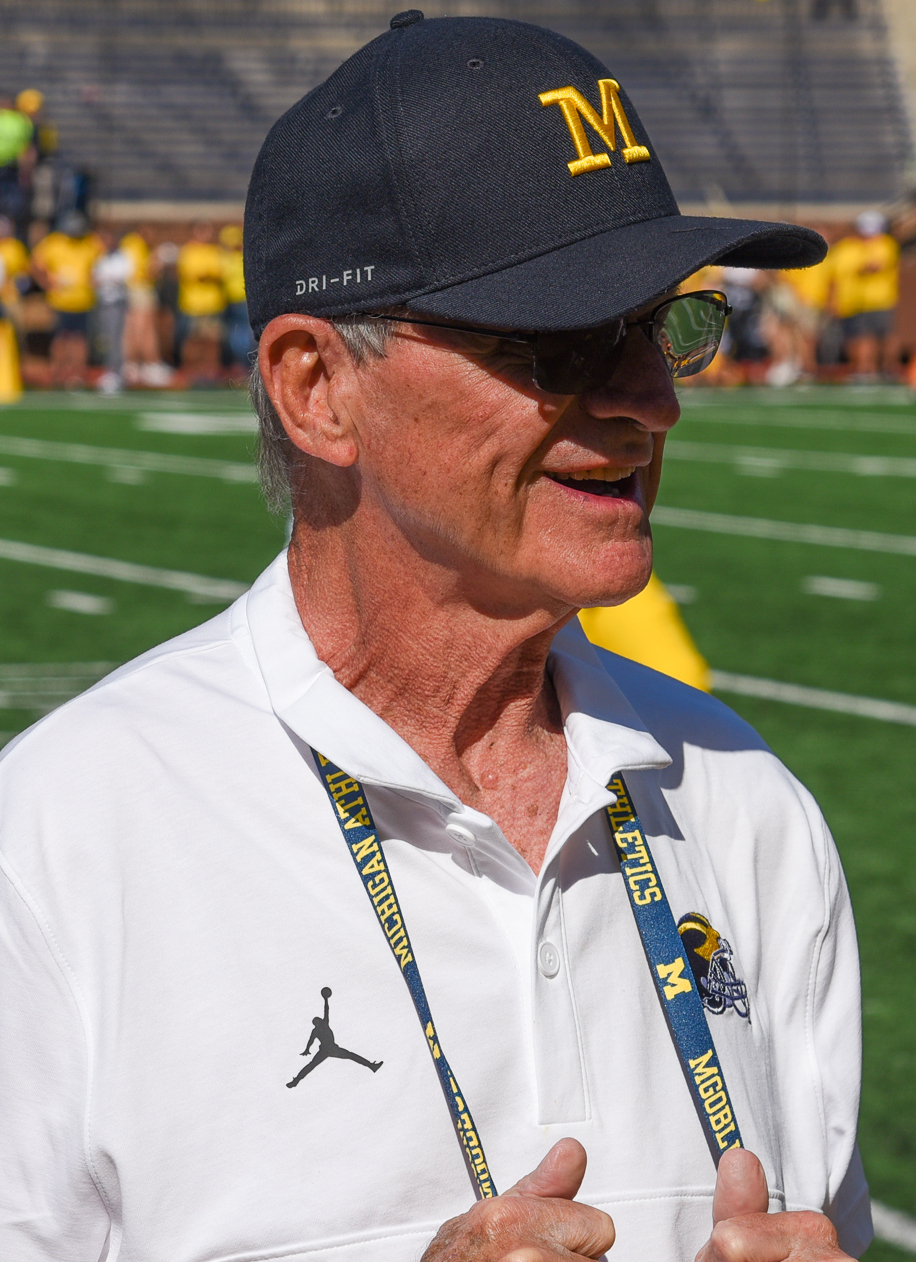
Jack Harbaugh led the Hilltoppers to their lone national championship as head coach in 2002.

The Western Kentucky Hilltoppers college football team represents Western Kentucky University in Conference USA (C-USA), as part of the NCAA Division I Football Bowl Subdivision. The program has had 22 head coaches and two interim head coaches since it began play during the 1913 season. Since November 2018, Tyson Helton has served as head coach at Western Kentucky.

Eleven coaches have led Western Kentucky in postseason playoff or bowl games: Jack Clayton, Nick Denes, Jimmy Feix, Dave Roberts, Jack Harbaugh, David Elson, Lance Guidry, Jeff Brohm, Nick Holt, Mike Sanford Jr., and Helton. Six coaches have won conference championships: Ernest R. Miller won one as a member of the Southern Intercollegiate Athletic Association; Clayton, Denes, and Harbaugh each won one and Feix won six as a member of the Ohio Valley Conference; Harbaugh won one as a member of the Gateway Football Conference; and Brohm won two as a member of C-USA. Harbaugh also won an NCAA Division I-AA Football Championship in 2002.

Feix is the leader in seasons coached, with 16 years as head coach and in games coached (168) and won (106). Miller has the highest winning percentage of those who have coached more than one game at 0.889. L. T. Smith has the lowest winning percentage of those who have coached more than one game, with 0.313.

== Key ==
Key to symbols in coaches list
General		Overall		Conference		Postseason (Note: Although the first Rose Bowl Game was played in 1902, it has been continuously played since the 1916 game, and is recognized as the oldest bowl game by the NCAA. "—" indicates any season prior to 1916 when postseason games were not played.)	
No.	Order of coaches (Note: A running total of the number of head coaches, with coaches who served separate tenures being counted only once. Interim head coaches are represented with "Int" and are not counted in the running total. "—" indicates the team played but either without a coach or no coach is on record. "X" indicates an interim year without play.)	GC	Games coached	CW	Conference wins	PW	Postseason wins
DC	Division championships	OW	Overall wins	CL	Conference losses	PL	Postseason losses
CC	Conference championships	OL	Overall losses	CT	Conference ties	PT	Postseason ties
NC	National championships	OT	Overall ties (Note: Overtime rules in college football were introduced in 1996, making ties impossible in the period since.)	C%	Conference winning percentage		
†	Elected to the College Football Hall of Fame	O%	Overall winning percentage (Note: When computing the win–loss percentage, a tie counts as half a win and half a loss.)				

== Coaches ==
List of head football coaches showing season(s) coached, overall records, conference records, postseason records, championships and selected awards (Note: Statistics correct as of the end of the 2025 NCAA Division I FBS football season.)
No.	Name	Year(s) (Note: Western Kentucky did not field a team for their 1917–1919 and 1943–1945 seasons.)	Season(s)	GC	OW	OL	OT	O%	CW	CL	CT	C%	PW	PL	PT	DC	CC	NC	Awards
1	M. A. Leiper	1913	1	1	1	0	0	1.000	—	—	—	—	—	—	—	—	—	0	—
1	Roy C. Manchester	1913	1	1	1	0	0	1.000	—	—	—	—	—	—	—	—	—	0	—
2	J. L. Arthur	1914–1916	3	15	5	8	2	0.400	—	—	—	—	—	—	—	—	—	0	—
3	L. T. Smith	1920–1921	2	8	2	5	1	0.313	—	—	—	—	—	—	—	—	—	0	—
4	Edgar Diddle	1922–1928	7	64	38	24	2	0.609	7	3	0	0.700	—	—	—	—	0	0	—
5	Carl Anderson	1929; 1934–1937	1, 4	36	24	9	3	0.708	18	8	2	0.679	—	—	—	—	0	0	—
6	James Elam	1930–1931	2	22	16	5	1	0.750	13	2	0	0.867	—	—	—	—	0	0	—
7	Ernest R. Miller	1932	1	9	8	1	0	0.889	6	0	0	1.000	—	—	—	—	1	0	—
8	Jesse Thomas	1933; 1946–1947	1, 2	25	11	12	2	0.480	7	7	0	0.500	—	—	—	—	0	0	—
9	Gander Terry	1938–1941	4	37	25	9	3	0.716	16	4	3	0.761	—	—	—	—	0	0	—
10	Arnold Winkenhofer	1942	1	8	3	4	1	0.438	2	2	1	0.500	—	—	—	—	0	0	—
11	Jack Clayton	1948–1956	9	85	50	33	2	0.600	21	24	2	0.468	1	0	0	—	1	0	—
12	Nick Denes	1957–1967	11	103	57	39	7	0.587	33	32	5	0.507	1	0	0	—	1	0	OVC Coach of the Year (1963)
13	Jimmy Feix	1968–1983	16	168	106	56	6	0.649	68	28	2	0.704	4	2	0	—	6	0	OVC Coach of the Year (1973, 1978, 1980)
14	Dave Roberts	1984–1988	5	57	26	30	1	0.465	—	—	—	—	1	2	0	—	—	0	—
15	Jack Harbaugh	1989–2002	14	159	91	68	0	0.572	22	6	0	0.786	6	3	0	—	2	1 – 2002	AFCA NCAA Division I-AA COY (2002); OVC Coach of the Year (2000)
16	David Elson	2003–2009	7	82	39	43	—	0.476	19	17	—	0.528	1	2	—	—	0	0	—
17	Willie Taggart	2010–2012	3	36	16	20	—	0.444	13	11	—	0.542	0	0	—	—	0	0	—
Int	Lance Guidry (Note: After Willie Taggart resigned to take the head coaching position at South Florida, Guidry served as interim head coach for the 2012 Little Caesars Pizza Bowl.)	2012	1	1	0	1	—	.000	0	0	—	–	0	1	—	—	0	0	—
18	Bobby Petrino	2013	1	12	8	4	—	0.667	4	3	—	0.571	0	0	—	—	0	0	—
19	Jeff Brohm	2014–2016	3	40	30	10	—	0.750	19	5	—	0.792	2	0	—	2	2	0	—
Int	Nick Holt (Note: After Jeff Brohm resigned to take the head coaching position at Purdue, Holt served as interim head coach for the 2016 Boca Raton Bowl.)	2016	1	1	1	0	—	1.000	0	0	—	–	1	0	—	—	0	0	—
20	Mike Sanford Jr.	2017–2018	2	25	9	16	—	0.360	6	10	—	0.375	0	1	—	0	0	0	—
21	Tyson Helton	2019–present	7	93	57	36	—	0.613	40	15	—	0.727	5	2	—	2	0	0	—
