= 1931 Miami Hurricanes football team =

American college football season

1931 Miami Hurricanes football
- Conference: Southern Intercollegiate Athletic Association
- Record: 4–8 (2–3 SIAA)
- Head coach: Tom McCann (1st season)
- Home stadium: Moore Park

1931 Southern Intercollegiate Athletic Association football standings
	Conf.					Overall
Team	W		L		T	W		L		T
Chattanooga $	8	–	0	–	0	9	–	2	–	0
Louisiana Tech	6	–	0	–	0	7	–	0	–	0
Centenary	3	–	0	–	0	5	–	5	–	0
Western Kentucky State Teachers	7	–	1	–	0	8	–	4	–	0
Centre	5	–	1	–	0	8	–	2	–	1
The Citadel	4	–	1	–	0	5	–	4	–	1
Howard (AL)	3	–	1	–	1	8	–	2	–	2
Mercer	6	–	2	–	0	7	–	2	–	1
Southwestern (TN)	3	–	1	–	1	4	–	2	–	3
Loyola (LA)	2	–	1	–	0	5	–	4	–	0
Georgetown (KY)	3	–	2	–	0	4	–	5	–	0
Birmingham–Southern	4	–	3	–	0	5	–	4	–	0
Mississippi College	4	–	3	–	0	5	–	4	–	0
Murray State	2	–	2	–	0	5	–	3	–	1
Union (TN)	4	–	4	–	0	5	–	4	–	0
Wofford	3	–	4	–	0	4	–	5	–	0
Miami (FL)	2	–	3	–	0	4	–	8	–	0
Spring Hill	2	–	3	–	0	3	–	6	–	0
Louisiana Normal	2	–	4	–	0	5	–	4	–	0
Millsaps	2	–	4	–	0	3	–	5	–	0
Eastern Kentucky State Teachers	1	–	2	–	0	2	–	5	–	1
Mississippi State Teachers	2	–	4	–	0	2	–	5	–	0
Middle Tennessee State Teachers	1	–	3	–	0	6	–	4	–	0
Presbyterian	1	–	4	–	1	2	–	5	–	2
Transylvania	1	–	4	–	0	2	–	7	–	0
SW Louisiana	1	–	4	–	0	1	–	6	–	1
Stetson	1	–	5	–	0	3	–	5	–	0
Erskine	1	–	5	–	1	2	–	6	–	3
Louisiana College	1	–	6	–	0	2	–	6	–	0
Rollins	0	–	1	–	0	6	–	1	–	0
Newberry	0	–	3	–	0	2	–	6	–	0
Louisville	0	–	5	–	0	0	–	8	–	0
$ – Conference champion

The 1931 Miami Hurricanes football team represented the University of Miami as a member of the Southern Intercollegiate Athletic Association (SIAA) in the 1931 college football season. The Hurricanes played their home games at Moore Park in Miami, Florida. The team was coached by Tom McCann, in his first year as head coach.

== Schedule ==
Date	Time	Opponent	Site	Result	Attendance	Source
October 9	8:00 p.m.	Bowdon College*	Moore Park; Miami, FL	L 7–12	5,000	
October 16	8:00 p.m.	Georgia State College*	Moore Park; Miami, FL	L 12–13		
October 23		Rollins	Moore Park; Miami, FL	W 7–0		
October 30		Southern College (FL)*	Moore Park; Miami, FL	L 20–31		
November 7		at Western Kentucky State Teachers	Bowling Green, KY	L 0–20		
November 11		at Murray State	Keiler Field; Paducah, KY	L 0–15	3,500	
November 14		at Middle Tennessee State Teachers	Murfreesboro, TN	L 6–24		
November 20		Alabama JV*	Moore Park; Miami, FL	L 0–16		
November 27		Erskine	Moore Park; Miami, FL	W 9–0		
December 4		Parris Island Marines*	Moore Park; Miami, FL	W 14–13		
December 11		Jacksonville State*	Moore Park; Miami, FL	W 14–13		
December 18		Norman Junior College*	Moore Park; Miami, FL	L 9–19		
*Non-conference game; All times are in Eastern time
