= 1931 Loyola Wolf Pack football team =

American college football season

1931 Loyola Wolf Pack football
- Conference: Southern Intercollegiate Athletic Association
- Record: 5–4 (2–1 SIAA)
- Head coach: Clark Shaughnessy (5th season)
- Home stadium: Loyola University Stadium

1931 Southern Intercollegiate Athletic Association football standings
	Conf.					Overall
Team	W		L		T	W		L		T
Chattanooga $	8	–	0	–	0	9	–	2	–	0
Louisiana Tech	6	–	0	–	0	7	–	0	–	0
Centenary	3	–	0	–	0	5	–	5	–	0
Western Kentucky State Teachers	7	–	1	–	0	8	–	4	–	0
Centre	5	–	1	–	0	8	–	2	–	1
The Citadel	4	–	1	–	0	5	–	4	–	1
Howard (AL)	3	–	1	–	1	8	–	2	–	2
Mercer	6	–	2	–	0	7	–	2	–	1
Southwestern (TN)	3	–	1	–	1	4	–	2	–	3
Loyola (LA)	2	–	1	–	0	5	–	4	–	0
Georgetown (KY)	3	–	2	–	0	4	–	5	–	0
Birmingham–Southern	4	–	3	–	0	5	–	4	–	0
Mississippi College	4	–	3	–	0	5	–	4	–	0
Murray State	2	–	2	–	0	5	–	3	–	1
Union (TN)	4	–	4	–	0	5	–	4	–	0
Wofford	3	–	4	–	0	4	–	5	–	0
Miami (FL)	2	–	3	–	0	4	–	8	–	0
Spring Hill	2	–	3	–	0	3	–	6	–	0
Louisiana Normal	2	–	4	–	0	5	–	4	–	0
Millsaps	2	–	4	–	0	3	–	5	–	0
Eastern Kentucky State Teachers	1	–	2	–	0	2	–	5	–	1
Mississippi State Teachers	2	–	4	–	0	2	–	5	–	0
Middle Tennessee State Teachers	1	–	3	–	0	6	–	4	–	0
Presbyterian	1	–	4	–	1	2	–	5	–	2
Transylvania	1	–	4	–	0	2	–	7	–	0
SW Louisiana	1	–	4	–	0	1	–	6	–	1
Stetson	1	–	5	–	0	3	–	5	–	0
Erskine	1	–	5	–	1	2	–	6	–	3
Louisiana College	1	–	6	–	0	2	–	6	–	0
Rollins	0	–	1	–	0	6	–	1	–	0
Newberry	0	–	3	–	0	2	–	6	–	0
Louisville	0	–	5	–	0	0	–	8	–	0
$ – Conference champion

The 1931 Loyola Wolf Pack football team was an American football team that represented Loyola College of New Orleans (now known as Loyola University New Orleans) as a member of the Southern Intercollegiate Athletic Association (SIAA) during the 1931 college football season. In its fifth season under head coach Clark Shaughnessy, the team compiled a 5–4 record and outscored opponents by a total of 154 to 91. The team played its home games at Loyola University Stadium in New Orleans.

== Schedule ==
Date	Opponent	Site	Result	Attendance	Source
September 18	Louisiana College	Loyola Stadium; New Orleans, LA	W 77–0		
September 25	St. Edward's (TX)*	Loyola Stadium; New Orleans, LA	W 38–6		
October 2	Chattanooga	Loyola Stadium; New Orleans, LA	L 0–6		
October 16	Oglethorpe*	Loyola Stadium; New Orleans, LA	W 12–7	10,000	
October 23	Mississippi College	Loyola Stadium; New Orleans, LA	W 13–4		
October 31	at Detroit*	University of Detroit Stadium; Detroit, MI	L 0–21	10,000	
November 6	Saint Louis*	Loyola Stadium; New Orleans, LA	L 0–32		
November 13	Xavier*	Loyola Stadium; New Orleans, LA	W 7–2		
November 26	Santa Clara*	Loyola Stadium; New Orleans, LA	L 7–13	10,000	
*Non-conference game
