= 1931 Centenary Gentlemen football team =

American college football season

1931 Centenary Gentlemen football
- Conference: Southern Intercollegiate Athletic Association
- Record: 5–5 (3–0 SIAA)
- Head coach: Homer Norton (9th season)
- Captain: Clyde Lee
- Home stadium: Fairgrounds Stadium

1931 Southern Intercollegiate Athletic Association football standings
	Conf.					Overall
Team	W		L		T	W		L		T
Chattanooga $	8	–	0	–	0	9	–	2	–	0
Louisiana Tech	6	–	0	–	0	7	–	0	–	0
Centenary	3	–	0	–	0	5	–	5	–	0
Western Kentucky State Teachers	7	–	1	–	0	8	–	4	–	0
Centre	5	–	1	–	0	8	–	2	–	1
The Citadel	4	–	1	–	0	5	–	4	–	1
Howard (AL)	3	–	1	–	1	8	–	2	–	2
Mercer	6	–	2	–	0	7	–	2	–	1
Southwestern (TN)	3	–	1	–	1	4	–	2	–	3
Loyola (LA)	2	–	1	–	0	5	–	4	–	0
Georgetown (KY)	3	–	2	–	0	4	–	5	–	0
Birmingham–Southern	4	–	3	–	0	5	–	4	–	0
Mississippi College	4	–	3	–	0	5	–	4	–	0
Murray State	2	–	2	–	0	5	–	3	–	1
Union (TN)	4	–	4	–	0	5	–	4	–	0
Wofford	3	–	4	–	0	4	–	5	–	0
Miami (FL)	2	–	3	–	0	4	–	8	–	0
Spring Hill	2	–	3	–	0	3	–	6	–	0
Louisiana Normal	2	–	4	–	0	5	–	4	–	0
Millsaps	2	–	4	–	0	3	–	5	–	0
Eastern Kentucky State Teachers	1	–	2	–	0	2	–	5	–	1
Mississippi State Teachers	2	–	4	–	0	2	–	5	–	0
Middle Tennessee State Teachers	1	–	3	–	0	6	–	4	–	0
Presbyterian	1	–	4	–	1	2	–	5	–	2
Transylvania	1	–	4	–	0	2	–	7	–	0
SW Louisiana	1	–	4	–	0	1	–	6	–	1
Stetson	1	–	5	–	0	3	–	5	–	0
Erskine	1	–	5	–	1	2	–	6	–	3
Louisiana College	1	–	6	–	0	2	–	6	–	0
Rollins	0	–	1	–	0	6	–	1	–	0
Newberry	0	–	3	–	0	2	–	6	–	0
Louisville	0	–	5	–	0	0	–	8	–	0
$ – Conference champion

The 1931 Centenary Gentlemen football team was an American football team that represented the Centenary College of Louisiana as a member of the Southern Intercollegiate Athletic Association (SIAA) during the 1931 college football season. In their ninth year under head coach Homer Norton, the team compiled a 5–5 record.

== Schedule ==
Date	Opponent	Site	Result	Attendance	Source
September 26	Louisiana Normal	Fairgrounds Stadium; Shreveport, LA	W 23–2	3,500	
October 3	Southeastern Oklahoma State*	Fairgrounds Stadium; Shreveport, LA	W 46–0	4,500	
October 10	Baylor*	Fairgrounds Stadium; Shreveport, LA	W 24–13		
October 17	Stetson	Fairgrounds Stadium; Shreveport, LA	W 27–0		
October 24	at SMU*	Fair Park Stadium; Dallas, TX	L 0–19		
October 31	Texas A&M*	Fairgrounds Stadium; Shreveport, LA	L 0–7	12,000	
November 7	at Purdue*	Ross–Ade Stadium; West Lafayette, IN	L 6–49	7,000	
November 14	Union (TN)	Fairgrounds Stadium; Shreveport, LA	W 19–0	1,000	
November 20	Texas*	Fairgrounds Stadium; Shreveport, LA	L 0–6	8,000	
November 26	Arkansas*	Fairgrounds Stadium; Shreveport, LA	L 0–6	5,000	
*Non-conference game
