= 1931 Mississippi A&M Aggies football team =

American college football season

1931 Mississippi A&M Aggies football
- Conference: Southern Conference
- Record: 2–6 (0–5 SoCon)
- Head coach: Ray G. Dauber (1st season)
- Home stadium: Scott Field

1931 Southern Conference football standings
	Conf.					Overall
Team	W		L		T	W		L		T
No. 2 Tulane $	8	–	0	–	0	11	–	1	–	0
No. 3 Tennessee	6	–	0	–	1	9	–	0	–	1
Alabama	7	–	1	–	0	9	–	1	–	0
No. 6 Georgia	6	–	1	–	0	8	–	2	–	0
Maryland	4	–	1	–	1	8	–	1	–	1
Kentucky	4	–	2	–	2	5	–	2	–	2
LSU	3	–	2	–	0	5	–	4	–	0
South Carolina	3	–	3	–	1	5	–	4	–	1
Duke	3	–	3	–	1	5	–	3	–	2
Auburn	3	–	3	–	0	5	–	3	–	0
Sewanee	3	–	3	–	0	6	–	3	–	1
Vanderbilt	3	–	4	–	0	5	–	4	–	0
North Carolina	2	–	3	–	3	4	–	3	–	3
Washington and Lee	2	–	3	–	0	4	–	5	–	1
Florida	2	–	4	–	2	2	–	6	–	2
Georgia Tech	2	–	4	–	1	2	–	7	–	1
VMI	2	–	4	–	0	3	–	6	–	1
NC State	2	–	4	–	0	3	–	6	–	0
VPI	1	–	4	–	1	3	–	4	–	2
Clemson	1	–	4	–	0	1	–	6	–	2
Ole Miss	1	–	5	–	0	2	–	6	–	1
Virginia	0	–	5	–	1	2	–	6	–	1
Mississippi A&M	0	–	5	–	0	2	–	6	–	0
$ – Conference champion; Rankings from Dickinson System

The 1931 Mississippi A&M Aggies football team was an American football team that represented the Agricultural and Mechanical College of the State of Mississippi (now known as Mississippi State University) as a member of the Southern Conference during the 1931 college football season. In their first season under head coach Ray G. Dauber, Mississippi A&M compiled a 2–6 record.

== Schedule ==
Date	Opponent	Site	Result	Source
September 25	at Millsaps*	Alumni Field; Jackson, MS	W 10–7	
October 3	Mississippi College*	Scott Field; Starkville, MS	L 2–6	
October 10	Alabama	Greer Memorial Field; Meridian, MS (rivalry)	L 0–53	
October 17	at LSU	Tiger Stadium; Baton Rouge, LA (rivalry)	L 0–31	
October 31	at Tulane	Tulane Stadium; New Orleans, LA	L 7–59	
November 7	NC State	Scott Field; Starkville, MS	L 0–6	
November 14	Southwestern (TN)*	Scott Field; Starkville, MS	W 14–0	
November 26	at Ole Miss	Hemingway Stadium; Oxford, MS (Egg Bowl)	L 14–25	
*Non-conference game
