= 1931 Sewanee Tigers football team =

American college football season

1931 Sewanee Tigers football
- Conference: Southern Conference
- Record: 6–3–1 (3–3 SoCon)
- Head coach: Harry E. Clark (1st season)
- Home stadium: Hardee Field

1931 Southern Conference football standings
	Conf.					Overall
Team	W		L		T	W		L		T
No. 2 Tulane $	8	–	0	–	0	11	–	1	–	0
No. 3 Tennessee	6	–	0	–	1	9	–	0	–	1
Alabama	7	–	1	–	0	9	–	1	–	0
No. 6 Georgia	6	–	1	–	0	8	–	2	–	0
Maryland	4	–	1	–	1	8	–	1	–	1
Kentucky	4	–	2	–	2	5	–	2	–	2
LSU	3	–	2	–	0	5	–	4	–	0
South Carolina	3	–	3	–	1	5	–	4	–	1
Duke	3	–	3	–	1	5	–	3	–	2
Auburn	3	–	3	–	0	5	–	3	–	0
Sewanee	3	–	3	–	0	6	–	3	–	1
Vanderbilt	3	–	4	–	0	5	–	4	–	0
North Carolina	2	–	3	–	3	4	–	3	–	3
Washington and Lee	2	–	3	–	0	4	–	5	–	1
Florida	2	–	4	–	2	2	–	6	–	2
Georgia Tech	2	–	4	–	1	2	–	7	–	1
VMI	2	–	4	–	0	3	–	6	–	1
NC State	2	–	4	–	0	3	–	6	–	0
VPI	1	–	4	–	1	3	–	4	–	2
Clemson	1	–	4	–	0	1	–	6	–	2
Ole Miss	1	–	5	–	0	2	–	6	–	1
Virginia	0	–	5	–	1	2	–	6	–	1
Mississippi A&M	0	–	5	–	0	2	–	6	–	0
$ – Conference champion; Rankings from Dickinson System

The 1931 Sewanee Tigers football team was an American football team that represented Sewanee: The University of the South as a member of the Southern Conference during the 1931 college football season. In their first season under head coach Harry E. Clark, Sewanee compiled a 6–3–1 record.

== Schedule ==
Date	Opponent	Site	Result	Attendance	Source
September 19	Jacksonville State*	Hardee Field; Sewanee, TN	W 18–0		
September 26	Tennessee Tech*	Hardee Field; Sewanee, TN	W 24–7		
October 3	at Southwestern (TN)*	Fargason Field; Memphis, TN (rivalry)	T 0–0		
October 10	at Virginia	Scott Stadium; Charlottesville, VA	W 3–0		
October 17	at Chattanooga	Chamberlain Field; Chattanooga, TN	W 6–0		
October 24	at Alabama	Legion Field; Birmingham, AL	L 0–33	5,000	
October 31	at LSU	Tiger Stadium; Baton Rouge, LA	W 12–6		
November 7	at Ole Miss	Hemingway Stadium; Oxford, MS	W 7–0		
November 14	at Auburn	Legion Field; Birmingham, AL	L 0–12		
November 21	at Tulane	Tulane Stadium; New Orleans, LA	L 0–40	8,000	
*Non-conference game
