= 1931 Louisiana Normal Demons football team =

American college football season

1931 Louisiana Normal Demons football
- Conference: Southern Intercollegiate Athletic Association
- Record: 5–4 (2–4 SIAA)
- Head coach: H. Lee Prather (18th season)
- Home stadium: Demon Field

1931 Southern Intercollegiate Athletic Association football standings
	Conf.					Overall
Team	W		L		T	W		L		T
Chattanooga $	8	–	0	–	0	9	–	2	–	0
Louisiana Tech	6	–	0	–	0	7	–	0	–	0
Centenary	3	–	0	–	0	5	–	5	–	0
Western Kentucky State Teachers	7	–	1	–	0	8	–	4	–	0
Centre	5	–	1	–	0	8	–	2	–	1
The Citadel	4	–	1	–	0	5	–	4	–	1
Howard (AL)	3	–	1	–	1	8	–	2	–	2
Mercer	6	–	2	–	0	7	–	2	–	1
Southwestern (TN)	3	–	1	–	1	4	–	2	–	3
Loyola (LA)	2	–	1	–	0	5	–	4	–	0
Georgetown (KY)	3	–	2	–	0	4	–	5	–	0
Birmingham–Southern	4	–	3	–	0	5	–	4	–	0
Mississippi College	4	–	3	–	0	5	–	4	–	0
Murray State	2	–	2	–	0	5	–	3	–	1
Union (TN)	4	–	4	–	0	5	–	4	–	0
Wofford	3	–	4	–	0	4	–	5	–	0
Miami (FL)	2	–	3	–	0	4	–	8	–	0
Spring Hill	2	–	3	–	0	3	–	6	–	0
Louisiana Normal	2	–	4	–	0	5	–	4	–	0
Millsaps	2	–	4	–	0	3	–	5	–	0
Eastern Kentucky State Teachers	1	–	2	–	0	2	–	5	–	1
Mississippi State Teachers	2	–	4	–	0	2	–	5	–	0
Middle Tennessee State Teachers	1	–	3	–	0	6	–	4	–	0
Presbyterian	1	–	4	–	1	2	–	5	–	2
Transylvania	1	–	4	–	0	2	–	7	–	0
SW Louisiana	1	–	4	–	0	1	–	6	–	1
Stetson	1	–	5	–	0	3	–	5	–	0
Erskine	1	–	5	–	1	2	–	6	–	3
Louisiana College	1	–	6	–	0	2	–	6	–	0
Rollins	0	–	1	–	0	6	–	1	–	0
Newberry	0	–	3	–	0	2	–	6	–	0
Louisville	0	–	5	–	0	0	–	8	–	0
$ – Conference champion

The 1931 Louisiana Normal Demons football team represented the Louisiana State Normal College (now known as Northwestern State University) as a member the Southern Intercollegiate Athletic Association (SIAA) during the 1931 college football season. Led by 18th-year head coach H. Lee Prather, the Demons compiled an overall record of 5–4 with a mark of 2–4 in conference play.

== Schedule ==
Date	Opponent	Site	Result	Attendance	Source
September 26	at Centenary	Fairgrounds Stadium; Shreveport, LA	L 2–23	3,500	
October 2	El Dorado Junior College*	Demon Field; Natchitoches, LA	W 92–0		
October 10	Lon Morris*	Demon Field; Natchitoches, LA	W 13–6		
October 16	Louisiana College	Demon Field; Natchitoches, LA	W 12–7		
October 23	at Union (TN)	Athletic Field; Jackson, TN	L 6–7		
October 30	at Louisiana Tech	Tech Stadium; Ruston, LA (rivalry)	L 2–18		
November 6	Stephen F. Austin*	Demon Field; Natchitoches, LA (rivalry)	W 19–0		
November 14	at Mississippi State Teachers	State Teachers Field; Hattiesburg, MS	L 0–32		
November 26	Southwestern Louisiana	Demon Field; Natchitoches, LA	W 38–2		
*Non-conference game
