= 1931 Southwestern Lynx football team =

American college football season

1931 Southwestern Lynx football
- Conference: Dixie Conference, Southern Intercollegiate Athletic Association
- Record: 4–2–3 (2–0–1 Dixie, 3–1–1 SIAA)
- Head coach: Jimmy R. Haygood (1st season)
- Home stadium: Fargason Field; Hodges Field

1931 Dixie Conference football standings
	Conf.					Overall
Team	W		L		T	W		L		T
Chattanooga $	4	–	0	–	0	9	–	2	–	0
Southwestern (TN)	2	–	0	–	1	4	–	2	–	3
Howard (AL)	3	–	1	–	1	8	–	2	–	2
Centre	1	–	1	–	0	8	–	2	–	1
Mississippi College	1	–	1	–	0	5	–	4	–	0
Birmingham–Southern	2	–	3	–	0	5	–	4	–	0
Mercer	1	–	2	–	0	7	–	2	–	1
Millsaps	0	–	3	–	0	3	–	5	–	0
Spring Hill	0	–	3	–	0	3	–	6	–	0
$ – Conference champion

1931 Southern Intercollegiate Athletic Association football standings
	Conf.					Overall
Team	W		L		T	W		L		T
Chattanooga $	8	–	0	–	0	9	–	2	–	0
Louisiana Tech	6	–	0	–	0	7	–	0	–	0
Centenary	3	–	0	–	0	5	–	5	–	0
Western Kentucky State Teachers	7	–	1	–	0	8	–	4	–	0
Centre	5	–	1	–	0	8	–	2	–	1
The Citadel	4	–	1	–	0	5	–	4	–	1
Howard (AL)	3	–	1	–	1	8	–	2	–	2
Mercer	6	–	2	–	0	7	–	2	–	1
Southwestern (TN)	3	–	1	–	1	4	–	2	–	3
Loyola (LA)	2	–	1	–	0	5	–	4	–	0
Georgetown (KY)	3	–	2	–	0	4	–	5	–	0
Birmingham–Southern	4	–	3	–	0	5	–	4	–	0
Mississippi College	4	–	3	–	0	5	–	4	–	0
Murray State	2	–	2	–	0	5	–	3	–	1
Union (TN)	4	–	4	–	0	5	–	4	–	0
Wofford	3	–	4	–	0	4	–	5	–	0
Miami (FL)	2	–	3	–	0	4	–	8	–	0
Spring Hill	2	–	3	–	0	3	–	6	–	0
Louisiana Normal	2	–	4	–	0	5	–	4	–	0
Millsaps	2	–	4	–	0	3	–	5	–	0
Eastern Kentucky State Teachers	1	–	2	–	0	2	–	5	–	1
Mississippi State Teachers	2	–	4	–	0	2	–	5	–	0
Middle Tennessee State Teachers	1	–	3	–	0	6	–	4	–	0
Presbyterian	1	–	4	–	1	2	–	5	–	2
Transylvania	1	–	4	–	0	2	–	7	–	0
SW Louisiana	1	–	4	–	0	1	–	6	–	1
Stetson	1	–	5	–	0	3	–	5	–	0
Erskine	1	–	5	–	1	2	–	6	–	3
Louisiana College	1	–	6	–	0	2	–	6	–	0
Rollins	0	–	1	–	0	6	–	1	–	0
Newberry	0	–	3	–	0	2	–	6	–	0
Louisville	0	–	5	–	0	0	–	8	–	0
$ – Conference champion

The 1931 Southwestern Lynx football team was an American football team that represented Southwestern, The College of the Mississippi Valley (now known as Rhodes College) as a member of the Dixie Conference and the Southern Intercollegiate Athletic Association (SIAA) in the 1931 college football season. Led by Jimmy R. Haygood in his first season as head coach, the team compiled an overall record of 4–2–3 and with a mark of 2–0–1 in Dixie Conference play and 3–1–1 against SIAA competition.

== Schedule ==
Date	Opponent	Site	Result	Attendance	Source
September 26	Delta State*	Fargason Field; Memphis, TN	W 32–0		
October 3	Sewanee*	Fargason Field; Memphis, TN (rivalry)	T 0–0		
October 9	at Millsaps	Jackson, MS	W 14–0		
October 24	Ole Miss*	Fargason Field; Memphis, TN	T 20–20		
October 31	Howard (AL)	Fargason Field; Memphis, TN	T 7–7	2,500	
November 7	at Mississippi State Teachers	State Teachers Field; Hattiesburg, MS	L 7–13		
November 14	at Mississippi A&M*	Scott Field; Starkville, MS	L 0–14		
November 21	Union (TN)	Fargason Field; Memphis, TN	W 54–13	2,000	
November 26	Spring Hill	Hodges Field; Memphis, TN	W 13–0	2,500	
*Non-conference game
