= 1931 Howard Bulldogs football team =

American college football season

1931 Howard Bulldogs football
- Conference: Dixie Conference, Southern Intercollegiate Athletic Association
- Record: 8–2–2 (3–1–1 Dixie, 3–1–1 SIAA)
- Head coach: Eddie McLane (3rd season)
- Home stadium: Legion Field

1931 Dixie Conference football standings
	Conf.					Overall
Team	W		L		T	W		L		T
Chattanooga $	4	–	0	–	0	9	–	2	–	0
Southwestern (TN)	2	–	0	–	1	4	–	2	–	3
Howard (AL)	3	–	1	–	1	8	–	2	–	2
Centre	1	–	1	–	0	8	–	2	–	1
Mississippi College	1	–	1	–	0	5	–	4	–	0
Birmingham–Southern	2	–	3	–	0	5	–	4	–	0
Mercer	1	–	2	–	0	7	–	2	–	1
Millsaps	0	–	3	–	0	3	–	5	–	0
Spring Hill	0	–	3	–	0	3	–	6	–	0
$ – Conference champion

1931 Southern Intercollegiate Athletic Association football standings
	Conf.					Overall
Team	W		L		T	W		L		T
Chattanooga $	8	–	0	–	0	9	–	2	–	0
Louisiana Tech	6	–	0	–	0	7	–	0	–	0
Centenary	3	–	0	–	0	5	–	5	–	0
Western Kentucky State Teachers	7	–	1	–	0	8	–	4	–	0
Centre	5	–	1	–	0	8	–	2	–	1
The Citadel	4	–	1	–	0	5	–	4	–	1
Howard (AL)	3	–	1	–	1	8	–	2	–	2
Mercer	6	–	2	–	0	7	–	2	–	1
Southwestern (TN)	3	–	1	–	1	4	–	2	–	3
Loyola (LA)	2	–	1	–	0	5	–	4	–	0
Georgetown (KY)	3	–	2	–	0	4	–	5	–	0
Birmingham–Southern	4	–	3	–	0	5	–	4	–	0
Mississippi College	4	–	3	–	0	5	–	4	–	0
Murray State	2	–	2	–	0	5	–	3	–	1
Union (TN)	4	–	4	–	0	5	–	4	–	0
Wofford	3	–	4	–	0	4	–	5	–	0
Miami (FL)	2	–	3	–	0	4	–	8	–	0
Spring Hill	2	–	3	–	0	3	–	6	–	0
Louisiana Normal	2	–	4	–	0	5	–	4	–	0
Millsaps	2	–	4	–	0	3	–	5	–	0
Eastern Kentucky State Teachers	1	–	2	–	0	2	–	5	–	1
Mississippi State Teachers	2	–	4	–	0	2	–	5	–	0
Middle Tennessee State Teachers	1	–	3	–	0	6	–	4	–	0
Presbyterian	1	–	4	–	1	2	–	5	–	2
Transylvania	1	–	4	–	0	2	–	7	–	0
SW Louisiana	1	–	4	–	0	1	–	6	–	1
Stetson	1	–	5	–	0	3	–	5	–	0
Erskine	1	–	5	–	1	2	–	6	–	3
Louisiana College	1	–	6	–	0	2	–	6	–	0
Rollins	0	–	1	–	0	6	–	1	–	0
Newberry	0	–	3	–	0	2	–	6	–	0
Louisville	0	–	5	–	0	0	–	8	–	0
$ – Conference champion

The 1931 Howard Bulldogs football team was an American football team that represented Howard College (now known as the Samford University) as a member of the Dixie Conference and the Southern Intercollegiate Athletic Association (SIAA) during the 1931 college football season. In their third year under head coach Eddie McLane, the team compiled a 8–2–2.

== Schedule ==
Date	Opponent	Site	Result	Attendance	Source
September 19	Marion*	Legion Field; Birmingham, AL	W 72–0		
September 26	at Alabama*	Denny Stadium; Tuscaloosa, AL	L 6–42	5,000	
October 2	Georgia State College*	Legion Field; Birmingham, AL	W 31–0		
October 2	Bowdon College*	Legion Field; Birmingham, AL	W 22–7		
October 10	at Chattanooga	Chamberlain Field; Chattanooga, TN	L 0–14		
October 17	at Millsaps	Mississippi State Fair; Jackson, MS	W 26–0		
October 23	at Maryville (TN)*	Maryville, TN	T 6–6		
October 31	at Southwestern (TN)	Fargason Field; Memphis, TN	T 7–7	2,500	
November 6	vs. Spring Hill	Cramton Bowl; Montgomery, AL	W 10–0	2,000	
November 11	vs. Southern College	Wiregrass Stadium; Dothan, AL	W 6–0	1,500	
November 21	Birmingham–Southern	Legion Field; Birmingham, AL	W 7–6	9,000	
November 26	Duquesne*	Legion Field; Birmingham, AL	W 13–6	5,000	
*Non-conference game
