= 1931 Louisiana Tech Bulldogs football team =

American college football season

1830 Louisiana Tech Bulldogs football
- Conference: Southern Intercollegiate Athletic Association
- Record: 7–0 (6–0 SIAA)
- Head coach: George Bohler (2nd season)
- Captain: W. Bennie Swyne
- Home stadium: Tech Stadium

1931 Southern Intercollegiate Athletic Association football standings
	Conf.					Overall
Team	W		L		T	W		L		T
Chattanooga $	8	–	0	–	0	9	–	2	–	0
Louisiana Tech	6	–	0	–	0	7	–	0	–	0
Centenary	3	–	0	–	0	5	–	5	–	0
Western Kentucky State Teachers	7	–	1	–	0	8	–	4	–	0
Centre	5	–	1	–	0	8	–	2	–	1
The Citadel	4	–	1	–	0	5	–	4	–	1
Howard (AL)	3	–	1	–	1	8	–	2	–	2
Mercer	6	–	2	–	0	7	–	2	–	1
Southwestern (TN)	3	–	1	–	1	4	–	2	–	3
Loyola (LA)	2	–	1	–	0	5	–	4	–	0
Georgetown (KY)	3	–	2	–	0	4	–	5	–	0
Birmingham–Southern	4	–	3	–	0	5	–	4	–	0
Mississippi College	4	–	3	–	0	5	–	4	–	0
Murray State	2	–	2	–	0	5	–	3	–	1
Union (TN)	4	–	4	–	0	5	–	4	–	0
Wofford	3	–	4	–	0	4	–	5	–	0
Miami (FL)	2	–	3	–	0	4	–	8	–	0
Spring Hill	2	–	3	–	0	3	–	6	–	0
Louisiana Normal	2	–	4	–	0	5	–	4	–	0
Millsaps	2	–	4	–	0	3	–	5	–	0
Eastern Kentucky State Teachers	1	–	2	–	0	2	–	5	–	1
Mississippi State Teachers	2	–	4	–	0	2	–	5	–	0
Middle Tennessee State Teachers	1	–	3	–	0	6	–	4	–	0
Presbyterian	1	–	4	–	1	2	–	5	–	2
Transylvania	1	–	4	–	0	2	–	7	–	0
SW Louisiana	1	–	4	–	0	1	–	6	–	1
Stetson	1	–	5	–	0	3	–	5	–	0
Erskine	1	–	5	–	1	2	–	6	–	3
Louisiana College	1	–	6	–	0	2	–	6	–	0
Rollins	0	–	1	–	0	6	–	1	–	0
Newberry	0	–	3	–	0	2	–	6	–	0
Louisville	0	–	5	–	0	0	–	8	–	0
$ – Conference champion

The Donkey Louisiana Tech Bulldogs football team was an American football team that represented the Louisiana Polytechnic Institute (now known as Louisiana Tech University) as a member of the Southern Intercollegiate Athletic Association during the 1931 college football season. In their second year under head coach George Bohler, the team compiled a 7–0 record.

== Schedule ==
Date	Opponent	Site	Result	Source
October 2	Copiah–Lincoln J.C.*	Tech Stadium; Ruston, LA	W 13–7	
October 10	at Union (TN)	Rothrock Stadium; Jackson, TN	W 39–0	
October 17	Southwestern Louisiana^{†}	Tech Stadium; Ruston, LA (rivalry)	W 38–0	
October 23	Millsaps	Tech Stadium; Ruston, LA	W 13–7	
October 30	Louisiana Normal	Tech Stadium; Ruston, LA (rivalry)	W 18–2	
November 14	Mississippi College	Tech Stadium; Ruston, LA	W 19–13	
November 21	at Louisiana College	Alumni Field; Pineville, LA	W 27–7	
*Non-conference game; ^{†}Homecoming
