= 1931 The Citadel Bulldogs football team =

American college football season

1931 The Citadel Bulldogs football
- Conference: Southern Intercollegiate Athletic Association
- Record: 5–4–1 (4–1 SIAA)
- Head coach: Johnny Floyd (2nd season)
- Home stadium: Johnson Hagood Stadium

1931 Southern Intercollegiate Athletic Association football standings
	Conf.					Overall
Team	W		L		T	W		L		T
Chattanooga $	8	–	0	–	0	9	–	2	–	0
Louisiana Tech	6	–	0	–	0	7	–	0	–	0
Centenary	3	–	0	–	0	5	–	5	–	0
Western Kentucky State Teachers	7	–	1	–	0	8	–	4	–	0
Centre	5	–	1	–	0	8	–	2	–	1
The Citadel	4	–	1	–	0	5	–	4	–	1
Howard (AL)	3	–	1	–	1	8	–	2	–	2
Mercer	6	–	2	–	0	7	–	2	–	1
Southwestern (TN)	3	–	1	–	1	4	–	2	–	3
Loyola (LA)	2	–	1	–	0	5	–	4	–	0
Georgetown (KY)	3	–	2	–	0	4	–	5	–	0
Birmingham–Southern	4	–	3	–	0	5	–	4	–	0
Mississippi College	4	–	3	–	0	5	–	4	–	0
Murray State	2	–	2	–	0	5	–	3	–	1
Union (TN)	4	–	4	–	0	5	–	4	–	0
Wofford	3	–	4	–	0	4	–	5	–	0
Miami (FL)	2	–	3	–	0	4	–	8	–	0
Spring Hill	2	–	3	–	0	3	–	6	–	0
Louisiana Normal	2	–	4	–	0	5	–	4	–	0
Millsaps	2	–	4	–	0	3	–	5	–	0
Eastern Kentucky State Teachers	1	–	2	–	0	2	–	5	–	1
Mississippi State Teachers	2	–	4	–	0	2	–	5	–	0
Middle Tennessee State Teachers	1	–	3	–	0	6	–	4	–	0
Presbyterian	1	–	4	–	1	2	–	5	–	2
Transylvania	1	–	4	–	0	2	–	7	–	0
SW Louisiana	1	–	4	–	0	1	–	6	–	1
Stetson	1	–	5	–	0	3	–	5	–	0
Erskine	1	–	5	–	1	2	–	6	–	3
Louisiana College	1	–	6	–	0	2	–	6	–	0
Rollins	0	–	1	–	0	6	–	1	–	0
Newberry	0	–	3	–	0	2	–	6	–	0
Louisville	0	–	5	–	0	0	–	8	–	0
$ – Conference champion

The 1931 Citadel Bulldogs football team represented The Citadel, The Military College of South Carolina in the 1931 college football season. Johnny Floyd served as head coach for the second season. The Bulldogs played as members of the Southern Intercollegiate Athletic Association and played home games at Johnson Hagood Stadium.

== Schedule ==
Date	Opponent	Site	Result	Attendance	Source
September 26	Mercer	Johnson Hagood Stadium; Charleston, SC	L 0–26		
October 3	Erskine	Johnson Hagood Stadium; Charleston, SC	W 12–6		
October 10	at VMI*	Alumni Field; Lexington, VA (rivalry)	T 13–13		
October 16	vs. Clemson*	Florence Memorial Stadium; Florence, SC	W 6–0		
October 23	Stetson	Johnson Hagood Stadium; Charleston, SC	W 6–0		
October 29	vs. South Carolina*	County Fairgrounds; Orangeburg, SC	L 7–26		
November 7	at Davidson*	Richardson Stadium; Davidson, NC	L 7–14		
November 14	at Furman*	Johnson Hagood Stadium; Charleston, SC (rivalry)	L 7–33		
November 21	at Presbyterian	Bailey Stadium; Clinton, SC	W 7–0	2,000	
November 26	Wofford	Johnson Hagood Stadium; Charleston, SC (rivalry)	W 28–7		
*Non-conference game
