= 1931 Louisville Cardinals football team =

American college football season

1931 Louisville Cardinals football
- Conference: Southern Intercollegiate Athletic Association
- Record: 0–8 (0–5 SIAA)
- Head coach: Jack McGrath (1st season)
- Home stadium: Parkway Field

1931 Southern Intercollegiate Athletic Association football standings
	Conf.					Overall
Team	W		L		T	W		L		T
Chattanooga $	8	–	0	–	0	9	–	2	–	0
Louisiana Tech	6	–	0	–	0	7	–	0	–	0
Centenary	3	–	0	–	0	5	–	5	–	0
Western Kentucky State Teachers	7	–	1	–	0	8	–	4	–	0
Centre	5	–	1	–	0	8	–	2	–	1
The Citadel	4	–	1	–	0	5	–	4	–	1
Howard (AL)	3	–	1	–	1	8	–	2	–	2
Mercer	6	–	2	–	0	7	–	2	–	1
Southwestern (TN)	3	–	1	–	1	4	–	2	–	3
Loyola (LA)	2	–	1	–	0	5	–	4	–	0
Georgetown (KY)	3	–	2	–	0	4	–	5	–	0
Birmingham–Southern	4	–	3	–	0	5	–	4	–	0
Mississippi College	4	–	3	–	0	5	–	4	–	0
Murray State	2	–	2	–	0	5	–	3	–	1
Union (TN)	4	–	4	–	0	5	–	4	–	0
Wofford	3	–	4	–	0	4	–	5	–	0
Miami (FL)	2	–	3	–	0	4	–	8	–	0
Spring Hill	2	–	3	–	0	3	–	6	–	0
Louisiana Normal	2	–	4	–	0	5	–	4	–	0
Millsaps	2	–	4	–	0	3	–	5	–	0
Eastern Kentucky State Teachers	1	–	2	–	0	2	–	5	–	1
Mississippi State Teachers	2	–	4	–	0	2	–	5	–	0
Middle Tennessee State Teachers	1	–	3	–	0	6	–	4	–	0
Presbyterian	1	–	4	–	1	2	–	5	–	2
Transylvania	1	–	4	–	0	2	–	7	–	0
SW Louisiana	1	–	4	–	0	1	–	6	–	1
Stetson	1	–	5	–	0	3	–	5	–	0
Erskine	1	–	5	–	1	2	–	6	–	3
Louisiana College	1	–	6	–	0	2	–	6	–	0
Rollins	0	–	1	–	0	6	–	1	–	0
Newberry	0	–	3	–	0	2	–	6	–	0
Louisville	0	–	5	–	0	0	–	8	–	0
$ – Conference champion

The 1931 Louisville Cardinals football team was an American football team that represented the University of Louisville as a member of the Southern Intercollegiate Athletic Association (SIAA) during the 1931 college football season. In their first and only season under head coach Jack McGrath, the Cardinals compiled a 0–8 record.

Louisville's 1931 season was the start of a 24-game losing streak that ended on November 18, 1933, with a 13–7 victory over Eastern Kentucky.

== Schedule ==
Date	Opponent	Site	Result
October 2	Hanover*	Louisville, KY	L 0–3
October 9	Transylvania	Louisville, KY	L 0–2 (forfeit)
October 16	at Butler*	Indianapolis, IN	L 6–61
October 24	Eastern Kentucky	Louisville, KY	L 0–2 (forfeit)
October 31	at Western Kentucky State Teachers	Bowling Green, KY	L 6–20
November 7	DePaul*	Louisville, KY	L 0–46
November 14	at Georgetown (KY)	Georgetown, KY	L 6–20
November 21	Centre	Louisville, KY	L 0–75
*Non-conference game
