= 1931 Rollins Tars football team =

College football season

1931 Rollins Tars football
- Conference: Southern Intercollegiate Athletic Association
- Record: 6–1 (0–1 SIAA)
- Head coach: Jack McDowall (3rd season)
- Home stadium: Tinker Field

1931 Southern Intercollegiate Athletic Association football standings
	Conf.					Overall
Team	W		L		T	W		L		T
Chattanooga $	8	–	0	–	0	9	–	2	–	0
Louisiana Tech	6	–	0	–	0	7	–	0	–	0
Centenary	3	–	0	–	0	5	–	5	–	0
Western Kentucky State Teachers	7	–	1	–	0	8	–	4	–	0
Centre	5	–	1	–	0	8	–	2	–	1
The Citadel	4	–	1	–	0	5	–	4	–	1
Howard (AL)	3	–	1	–	1	8	–	2	–	2
Mercer	6	–	2	–	0	7	–	2	–	1
Southwestern (TN)	3	–	1	–	1	4	–	2	–	3
Loyola (LA)	2	–	1	–	0	5	–	4	–	0
Georgetown (KY)	3	–	2	–	0	4	–	5	–	0
Birmingham–Southern	4	–	3	–	0	5	–	4	–	0
Mississippi College	4	–	3	–	0	5	–	4	–	0
Murray State	2	–	2	–	0	5	–	3	–	1
Union (TN)	4	–	4	–	0	5	–	4	–	0
Wofford	3	–	4	–	0	4	–	5	–	0
Miami (FL)	2	–	3	–	0	4	–	8	–	0
Spring Hill	2	–	3	–	0	3	–	6	–	0
Louisiana Normal	2	–	4	–	0	5	–	4	–	0
Millsaps	2	–	4	–	0	3	–	5	–	0
Eastern Kentucky State Teachers	1	–	2	–	0	2	–	5	–	1
Mississippi State Teachers	2	–	4	–	0	2	–	5	–	0
Middle Tennessee State Teachers	1	–	3	–	0	6	–	4	–	0
Presbyterian	1	–	4	–	1	2	–	5	–	2
Transylvania	1	–	4	–	0	2	–	7	–	0
SW Louisiana	1	–	4	–	0	1	–	6	–	1
Stetson	1	–	5	–	0	3	–	5	–	0
Erskine	1	–	5	–	1	2	–	6	–	3
Louisiana College	1	–	6	–	0	2	–	6	–	0
Rollins	0	–	1	–	0	6	–	1	–	0
Newberry	0	–	3	–	0	2	–	6	–	0
Louisville	0	–	5	–	0	0	–	8	–	0
$ – Conference champion

The 1931 Rollins Tars football team was an American football team that represented Rollins College as a member of the Southern Intercollegiate Athletic Association (SIAA) during the 1931 college football season. Led by Jack McDowall in his third season as head coach, the Tars compiled an overall record of 6–1.

== Schedule ==
Date	Opponent	Site	Result	Attendance	Source
October 10	Jacksonville State*	Tinker Field; Orlando, FL	W 37–14		
October 16	Florida "B" team*	Tinker Field; Orlando, FL	W 14–0	3,000	
October 23	at Miami (FL)	Moore Park; Miami, FL	L 0–7		
October 31	South Georgia State College*	Tinker Field; Orlando, FL	W 37–6		
November 14	Millsaps	Tinker Field; Orlando, FL	Canceled		
November 21	at Bowdon College*	Bowdon, GA	W 12–6		
November 26	at Piedmont*	Demorest, GA	W 7–6		
December 3	Lynchburg*	Tinker Field; Orlando, FL	W 19–0		
*Non-conference game
