= Tom McCann =

- McCann, c. 1930

Biographical details
- Born: November 7, 1898; Waukegan, Illinois, U.S.
- Died: March 23, 1975 (aged 76)

Playing career

Baseball
- 1921–1922: Illinois
- Position: Pitcher

Coaching career (HC unless noted)

Football
- 1924: Tusculum
- 1929: Plant City HS (FL)
- 1931–1934: Miami (FL)

Basketball
- 1928–1929: Miami (FL)
- 1931–1932: Miami (FL)

Head coaching record
- Overall: 22–19–4 (college football)
- Bowls: 0–1

Thomas E. McCann (November 7, 1898 – March 23, 1975) was an American baseball player and coach of football and basketball. He served as the head football coach at Tusculum College in 1924 and at the University of Miami from 1931 to 1934. McCann was also the head basketball coach at Miami during the 1928–29 and 1931–32 seasons.

In 1929, he coached football at Plant City High School in Plant City, Florida. McCann played college baseball at the University of Illinois at Urbana–Champaign in 1921 and 1922.

== Head coaching record ==
=== College football ===
Year	Team	Overall	Conference	Standing	Bowl/playoffs
Tusculum Pioneers () (1924)
1924	Tusculum	4–4			
Tusculum:		4–4			
Miami Hurricanes (Southern Intercollegiate Athletic Association) (1931–1934)
1931	Miami	4–8	2–3	T–17th	
1932	Miami	4–3–1	0–2–1	26th	
1933	Miami	5–1–2	2–0–1	6th	
1934	Miami	5–3–1	2–1–1	T–11th	L Orange
Miami:		18–15–4	6–6–3		
Total:		22–19–4			
