= 1931 Western Kentucky State Teachers Hilltoppers football team =

American college football season

1931 Western Kentucky State Teachers Hilltoppers football
- Conference: Southern Intercollegiate Athletic Association
- Record: 8–4 (7–1 SIAA)
- Head coach: James Elam (2nd season)

1931 Southern Intercollegiate Athletic Association football standings
	Conf.					Overall
Team	W		L		T	W		L		T
Chattanooga $	8	–	0	–	0	9	–	2	–	0
Louisiana Tech	6	–	0	–	0	7	–	0	–	0
Centenary	3	–	0	–	0	5	–	5	–	0
Western Kentucky State Teachers	7	–	1	–	0	8	–	4	–	0
Centre	5	–	1	–	0	8	–	2	–	1
The Citadel	4	–	1	–	0	5	–	4	–	1
Howard (AL)	3	–	1	–	1	8	–	2	–	2
Mercer	6	–	2	–	0	7	–	2	–	1
Southwestern (TN)	3	–	1	–	1	4	–	2	–	3
Loyola (LA)	2	–	1	–	0	5	–	4	–	0
Georgetown (KY)	3	–	2	–	0	4	–	5	–	0
Birmingham–Southern	4	–	3	–	0	5	–	4	–	0
Mississippi College	4	–	3	–	0	5	–	4	–	0
Murray State	2	–	2	–	0	5	–	3	–	1
Union (TN)	4	–	4	–	0	5	–	4	–	0
Wofford	3	–	4	–	0	4	–	5	–	0
Miami (FL)	2	–	3	–	0	4	–	8	–	0
Spring Hill	2	–	3	–	0	3	–	6	–	0
Louisiana Normal	2	–	4	–	0	5	–	4	–	0
Millsaps	2	–	4	–	0	3	–	5	–	0
Eastern Kentucky State Teachers	1	–	2	–	0	2	–	5	–	1
Mississippi State Teachers	2	–	4	–	0	2	–	5	–	0
Middle Tennessee State Teachers	1	–	3	–	0	6	–	4	–	0
Presbyterian	1	–	4	–	1	2	–	5	–	2
Transylvania	1	–	4	–	0	2	–	7	–	0
SW Louisiana	1	–	4	–	0	1	–	6	–	1
Stetson	1	–	5	–	0	3	–	5	–	0
Erskine	1	–	5	–	1	2	–	6	–	3
Louisiana College	1	–	6	–	0	2	–	6	–	0
Rollins	0	–	1	–	0	6	–	1	–	0
Newberry	0	–	3	–	0	2	–	6	–	0
Louisville	0	–	5	–	0	0	–	8	–	0
$ – Conference champion

The 1931 Western Kentucky State Teachers Hilltoppers football team represented Western Kentucky State Teachers College (now known as Western Kentucky University) in the 1931 college football season. They were led by second-year coach James Elam.

== Schedule ==
Date	Opponent	Site	Result	Source
September 19	at Ole Miss	Hemingway Stadium; Oxford, MS	L 6–13	
September 28	at Vanderbilt	Dudley Field; Nashville, TN	L 6–52	
October 3	at Centre	Danville, KY	L 7–28	
October 10	Catawba	Bowling Green, KY	W 14–7	
October 17	Middle Tennessee State Teachers	Bowling Green, KY (rivalry)	W 12–0	
October 24	Murray State	Bowling Green, KY (rivalry)	W 7–0	
October 29	at Union (TN)	Barbourville, KY	W 12–0	
October 31	Louisville	Bowling Green, KY	W 20–6	
November 6	Miami (FL)^{†}	Bowling Green, KY	W 20–0	
November 14	at Western State Teachers	Western State Teachers College Field; Kalamazoo, MI	L 0–13	
November 21	Eastern Kentucky	Bowling Green, KY (rivalry)	W 42–7	
November 28	Georgetown (KY)	Bowling Green, KY	W 25–0	
^{†}Homecoming
