= 1931 Mississippi College Choctaws football team =

College football season

1931 Mississippi College Choctaws football
- Conference: Dixie Conference, Southern Intercollegiate Athletic Association
- Record: 5–4 (1–1 Dixie, 4–3 SIAA)
- Head coach: Stanley L. Robinson (7th season)
- Home stadium: Provine Field; Municipal Stadium

1931 Dixie Conference football standings
	Conf.					Overall
Team	W		L		T	W		L		T
Chattanooga $	4	–	0	–	0	9	–	2	–	0
Southwestern (TN)	2	–	0	–	1	4	–	2	–	3
Howard (AL)	3	–	1	–	1	8	–	2	–	2
Centre	1	–	1	–	0	8	–	2	–	1
Mississippi College	1	–	1	–	0	5	–	4	–	0
Birmingham–Southern	2	–	3	–	0	5	–	4	–	0
Mercer	1	–	2	–	0	7	–	2	–	1
Millsaps	0	–	3	–	0	3	–	5	–	0
Spring Hill	0	–	3	–	0	3	–	6	–	0
$ – Conference champion

1931 Southern Intercollegiate Athletic Association football standings
	Conf.					Overall
Team	W		L		T	W		L		T
Chattanooga $	8	–	0	–	0	9	–	2	–	0
Louisiana Tech	6	–	0	–	0	7	–	0	–	0
Centenary	3	–	0	–	0	5	–	5	–	0
Western Kentucky State Teachers	7	–	1	–	0	8	–	4	–	0
Centre	5	–	1	–	0	8	–	2	–	1
The Citadel	4	–	1	–	0	5	–	4	–	1
Howard (AL)	3	–	1	–	1	8	–	2	–	2
Mercer	6	–	2	–	0	7	–	2	–	1
Southwestern (TN)	3	–	1	–	1	4	–	2	–	3
Loyola (LA)	2	–	1	–	0	5	–	4	–	0
Georgetown (KY)	3	–	2	–	0	4	–	5	–	0
Birmingham–Southern	4	–	3	–	0	5	–	4	–	0
Mississippi College	4	–	3	–	0	5	–	4	–	0
Murray State	2	–	2	–	0	5	–	3	–	1
Union (TN)	4	–	4	–	0	5	–	4	–	0
Wofford	3	–	4	–	0	4	–	5	–	0
Miami (FL)	2	–	3	–	0	4	–	8	–	0
Spring Hill	2	–	3	–	0	3	–	6	–	0
Louisiana Normal	2	–	4	–	0	5	–	4	–	0
Millsaps	2	–	4	–	0	3	–	5	–	0
Eastern Kentucky State Teachers	1	–	2	–	0	2	–	5	–	1
Mississippi State Teachers	2	–	4	–	0	2	–	5	–	0
Middle Tennessee State Teachers	1	–	3	–	0	6	–	4	–	0
Presbyterian	1	–	4	–	1	2	–	5	–	2
Transylvania	1	–	4	–	0	2	–	7	–	0
SW Louisiana	1	–	4	–	0	1	–	6	–	1
Stetson	1	–	5	–	0	3	–	5	–	0
Erskine	1	–	5	–	1	2	–	6	–	3
Louisiana College	1	–	6	–	0	2	–	6	–	0
Rollins	0	–	1	–	0	6	–	1	–	0
Newberry	0	–	3	–	0	2	–	6	–	0
Louisville	0	–	5	–	0	0	–	8	–	0
$ – Conference champion

The 1931 Mississippi College Choctaws football team was an American football team that represented Mississippi College as a member of the Dixie Conference and the Southern Intercollegiate Athletic Association (SIAA) in the 1931 college football season. Led by Stanley L. Robinson in his seventh season as head coach, the team compiled an overall record of 5–4 and with a mark of 1–1 in Dixie Conference play and 4–3 against SIAA competition.

== Schedule ==
Date	Opponent	Site	Result	Source
September 26	Louisiana College	Municipal Stadium; Jackson, MS	W 36–6	
October 3	at Mississippi A&M*	Scott Field; Starkville, MS	W 6–2	
October 10	Mississippi State Teachers	Provine Field; Clinton, MS	W 46–13	
October 16	Birmingham–Southern	Municipal Stadium; Jackson, MS	L 0–7	
October 23	at Loyola (LA)	Loyola Stadium; New Orleans, LA	L 4–13	
October 31	at Colgate*	Whitnall Field; Hamilton, NY	L 0–27	
November 7	Southwestern Louisiana	Provine Field; Clinton, MS	W 54–0	
November 14	at Louisiana Tech	Tech Stadium; Ruston, LA	L 13–19	
November 26	at Millsaps	Major Field; Jackson, MS (rivalry)	W 9–0	
*Non-conference game
