= 1931 Birmingham–Southern Panthers football team =

American college football season

1931 Birmingham–Southern Panthers football
- Conference: Dixie Conference, Southern Intercollegiate Athletic Association
- Record: 5–4 (2–3 Dixie, 4–3 SIAA)
- Head coach: Jenks Gillem (4th season)
- Home stadium: Legion Field

1931 Dixie Conference football standings
	Conf.					Overall
Team	W		L		T	W		L		T
Chattanooga $	4	–	0	–	0	9	–	2	–	0
Southwestern (TN)	2	–	0	–	1	4	–	2	–	3
Howard (AL)	3	–	1	–	1	8	–	2	–	2
Centre	1	–	1	–	0	8	–	2	–	1
Mississippi College	1	–	1	–	0	5	–	4	–	0
Birmingham–Southern	2	–	3	–	0	5	–	4	–	0
Mercer	1	–	2	–	0	7	–	2	–	1
Millsaps	0	–	3	–	0	3	–	5	–	0
Spring Hill	0	–	3	–	0	3	–	6	–	0
$ – Conference champion

1931 Southern Intercollegiate Athletic Association football standings
	Conf.					Overall
Team	W		L		T	W		L		T
Chattanooga $	8	–	0	–	0	9	–	2	–	0
Louisiana Tech	6	–	0	–	0	7	–	0	–	0
Centenary	3	–	0	–	0	5	–	5	–	0
Western Kentucky State Teachers	7	–	1	–	0	8	–	4	–	0
Centre	5	–	1	–	0	8	–	2	–	1
The Citadel	4	–	1	–	0	5	–	4	–	1
Howard (AL)	3	–	1	–	1	8	–	2	–	2
Mercer	6	–	2	–	0	7	–	2	–	1
Southwestern (TN)	3	–	1	–	1	4	–	2	–	3
Loyola (LA)	2	–	1	–	0	5	–	4	–	0
Georgetown (KY)	3	–	2	–	0	4	–	5	–	0
Birmingham–Southern	4	–	3	–	0	5	–	4	–	0
Mississippi College	4	–	3	–	0	5	–	4	–	0
Murray State	2	–	2	–	0	5	–	3	–	1
Union (TN)	4	–	4	–	0	5	–	4	–	0
Wofford	3	–	4	–	0	4	–	5	–	0
Miami (FL)	2	–	3	–	0	4	–	8	–	0
Spring Hill	2	–	3	–	0	3	–	6	–	0
Louisiana Normal	2	–	4	–	0	5	–	4	–	0
Millsaps	2	–	4	–	0	3	–	5	–	0
Eastern Kentucky State Teachers	1	–	2	–	0	2	–	5	–	1
Mississippi State Teachers	2	–	4	–	0	2	–	5	–	0
Middle Tennessee State Teachers	1	–	3	–	0	6	–	4	–	0
Presbyterian	1	–	4	–	1	2	–	5	–	2
Transylvania	1	–	4	–	0	2	–	7	–	0
SW Louisiana	1	–	4	–	0	1	–	6	–	1
Stetson	1	–	5	–	0	3	–	5	–	0
Erskine	1	–	5	–	1	2	–	6	–	3
Louisiana College	1	–	6	–	0	2	–	6	–	0
Rollins	0	–	1	–	0	6	–	1	–	0
Newberry	0	–	3	–	0	2	–	6	–	0
Louisville	0	–	5	–	0	0	–	8	–	0
$ – Conference champion

The 1931 Birmingham–Southern Panthers football team was an American football team that represented Birmingham–Southern College as a member of the Dixie Conference and the Southern Intercollegiate Athletic Association during the 1931 college football season. In their fourth season under head coach Jenks Gillem, the team compiled a 5–4 record.

== Schedule ==
Date	Opponent	Site	Result	Attendance	Source
September 25	at Auburn*	Cramton Bowl; Montgomery, AL	L 6–24		
October 3	Wofford	Legion Field; Birmingham, AL	W 21–14		
October 10	vs. Stetson	Wiregrass Stadium; Dothan, AL	W 20–0		
October 16	at Mississippi College	Municipal Stadium; Jackson, MS	W 7–0		
October 24	at Jacksonville State*	Fair Park; Anniston, AL	W 40–0		
October 31	Chattanooga	Legion Field; Birmingham, AL	L 0–26		
November 7	at Mercer	Centennial Stadium; Macon, GA	L 0–12	8,000	
November 11	at Spring Hill	Mobile, AL	W 6–0		
November 21	Howard (AL)	Legion Field; Birmingham, AL	L 7–6	9,000	
*Non-conference game
