= 1931 Chattanooga Moccasins football team =

American college football season

1931 Chattanooga Moccasins football

Dixie champion SIAA champion
- Conference: Dixie Conference, Southern Intercollegiate Athletic Association
- Record: 9–2 (4–0 Dixie, 8–0 SIAA)
- Head coach: Scrappy Moore (1st season)
- Captain: Game captains
- Home stadium: Chamberlain Field

1931 Dixie Conference football standings
	Conf.					Overall
Team	W		L		T	W		L		T
Chattanooga $	4	–	0	–	0	9	–	2	–	0
Southwestern (TN)	2	–	0	–	1	4	–	2	–	3
Howard (AL)	3	–	1	–	1	8	–	2	–	2
Centre	1	–	1	–	0	8	–	2	–	1
Mississippi College	1	–	1	–	0	5	–	4	–	0
Birmingham–Southern	2	–	3	–	0	5	–	4	–	0
Mercer	1	–	2	–	0	7	–	2	–	1
Millsaps	0	–	3	–	0	3	–	5	–	0
Spring Hill	0	–	3	–	0	3	–	6	–	0
$ – Conference champion

1931 Southern Intercollegiate Athletic Association football standings
	Conf.					Overall
Team	W		L		T	W		L		T
Chattanooga $	8	–	0	–	0	9	–	2	–	0
Louisiana Tech	6	–	0	–	0	7	–	0	–	0
Centenary	3	–	0	–	0	5	–	5	–	0
Western Kentucky State Teachers	7	–	1	–	0	8	–	4	–	0
Centre	5	–	1	–	0	8	–	2	–	1
The Citadel	4	–	1	–	0	5	–	4	–	1
Howard (AL)	3	–	1	–	1	8	–	2	–	2
Mercer	6	–	2	–	0	7	–	2	–	1
Southwestern (TN)	3	–	1	–	1	4	–	2	–	3
Loyola (LA)	2	–	1	–	0	5	–	4	–	0
Georgetown (KY)	3	–	2	–	0	4	–	5	–	0
Birmingham–Southern	4	–	3	–	0	5	–	4	–	0
Mississippi College	4	–	3	–	0	5	–	4	–	0
Murray State	2	–	2	–	0	5	–	3	–	1
Union (TN)	4	–	4	–	0	5	–	4	–	0
Wofford	3	–	4	–	0	4	–	5	–	0
Miami (FL)	2	–	3	–	0	4	–	8	–	0
Spring Hill	2	–	3	–	0	3	–	6	–	0
Louisiana Normal	2	–	4	–	0	5	–	4	–	0
Millsaps	2	–	4	–	0	3	–	5	–	0
Eastern Kentucky State Teachers	1	–	2	–	0	2	–	5	–	1
Mississippi State Teachers	2	–	4	–	0	2	–	5	–	0
Middle Tennessee State Teachers	1	–	3	–	0	6	–	4	–	0
Presbyterian	1	–	4	–	1	2	–	5	–	2
Transylvania	1	–	4	–	0	2	–	7	–	0
SW Louisiana	1	–	4	–	0	1	–	6	–	1
Stetson	1	–	5	–	0	3	–	5	–	0
Erskine	1	–	5	–	1	2	–	6	–	3
Louisiana College	1	–	6	–	0	2	–	6	–	0
Rollins	0	–	1	–	0	6	–	1	–	0
Newberry	0	–	3	–	0	2	–	6	–	0
Louisville	0	–	5	–	0	0	–	8	–	0
$ – Conference champion

The 1931 Chattanooga Moccasins football team represented the University of Chattanooga in the Dixie Conference and the Southern Intercollegiate Athletic Association (SIAA) during the 1931 college football season. In Scrappy Moore's first season as head coach, the team compiled a 9–2 record overall and an 8–0 against SIAA opponents, winning the SIAA championship.

== Schedule ==
Date	Opponent	Site	Result	Attendance	Source
September 19	Middle Tennessee State Teachers	Chamberlain Field; Chattanooga, TN	W 19–0		
September 26	at Oglethorpe*	Hermance Stadium; North Atlanta, GA	W 12–7		
October 2	at Loyola (LA)	Loyola Stadium; New Orleans, LA	W 6–0		
October 10	Howard (AL)	Chamberlain Field; Chattanooga, TN	W 14–0		
October 17	Sewanee*	Chamberlain Field; Chattanooga, TN	L 0–6		
October 24	Presbyterian	Chamberlain Field; Chattanooga, TN	W 32–7		
October 31	at Birmingham–Southern	Legion Field; Birmingham, AL	W 26–0		
November 7	Transylvania	Chamberlain Field; Chattanooga, TN	W 68–7		
November 14	Mercer	Chamberlain Field; Chattanooga, TN	W 27–19		
November 26	Centre	Chamberlain Field; Chattanooga, TN	W 25–7		
December 5	Alabama*	Chamberlain Field; Chattanooga, TN	L 0–39	3,000	
*Non-conference game
