= 1931 Southwestern Louisiana Bulldogs football team =

American college football season

1931 Southwestern Louisiana Bulldogs football
- Conference: Southern Intercollegiate Athletic Association
- Record: 1–6–1 (1–4 SIAA)
- Head coach: Truman F. Wilbanks (1st season)
- Home stadium: Campus Athletic Field

1931 Southern Intercollegiate Athletic Association football standings
	Conf.					Overall
Team	W		L		T	W		L		T
Chattanooga $	8	–	0	–	0	9	–	2	–	0
Louisiana Tech	6	–	0	–	0	7	–	0	–	0
Centenary	3	–	0	–	0	5	–	5	–	0
Western Kentucky State Teachers	7	–	1	–	0	8	–	4	–	0
Centre	5	–	1	–	0	8	–	2	–	1
The Citadel	4	–	1	–	0	5	–	4	–	1
Howard (AL)	3	–	1	–	1	8	–	2	–	2
Mercer	6	–	2	–	0	7	–	2	–	1
Southwestern (TN)	3	–	1	–	1	4	–	2	–	3
Loyola (LA)	2	–	1	–	0	5	–	4	–	0
Georgetown (KY)	3	–	2	–	0	4	–	5	–	0
Birmingham–Southern	4	–	3	–	0	5	–	4	–	0
Mississippi College	4	–	3	–	0	5	–	4	–	0
Murray State	2	–	2	–	0	5	–	3	–	1
Union (TN)	4	–	4	–	0	5	–	4	–	0
Wofford	3	–	4	–	0	4	–	5	–	0
Miami (FL)	2	–	3	–	0	4	–	8	–	0
Spring Hill	2	–	3	–	0	3	–	6	–	0
Louisiana Normal	2	–	4	–	0	5	–	4	–	0
Millsaps	2	–	4	–	0	3	–	5	–	0
Eastern Kentucky State Teachers	1	–	2	–	0	2	–	5	–	1
Mississippi State Teachers	2	–	4	–	0	2	–	5	–	0
Middle Tennessee State Teachers	1	–	3	–	0	6	–	4	–	0
Presbyterian	1	–	4	–	1	2	–	5	–	2
Transylvania	1	–	4	–	0	2	–	7	–	0
SW Louisiana	1	–	4	–	0	1	–	6	–	1
Stetson	1	–	5	–	0	3	–	5	–	0
Erskine	1	–	5	–	1	2	–	6	–	3
Louisiana College	1	–	6	–	0	2	–	6	–	0
Rollins	0	–	1	–	0	6	–	1	–	0
Newberry	0	–	3	–	0	2	–	6	–	0
Louisville	0	–	5	–	0	0	–	8	–	0
$ – Conference champion

The 1931 Southwestern Louisiana Bulldogs football team was an American football team that represented the Southwestern Louisiana Institute of Liberal and Technical Learning (now known as the University of Louisiana at Lafayette) in the Southern Intercollegiate Athletic Association during the 1931 college football season. In their first year under head coach Truman F. Wilbanks, the team compiled a 1–6–1 record.

== Schedule ==
Date	Opponent	Site	Result	Source
October 3	Southeastern Louisiana*	Campus Athletic Field; Lafayette, LA (rivalry)	T 6–6	
October 10	Marshall (TX)*	Campus Athletic Field; Lafayette, LA	L 0–25	
October 17	at Louisiana Tech	Tech Stadium; Ruston, LA (rivalry)	L 0–38	
October 24	Spring Hill	Campus Athletic Field; Lafayette, LA	L 0–25	
October 31	Louisiana College	Campus Athletic Field; Lafayette, LA	W 7–6	
November 7	at Mississippi College	Provine Field; Clinton, MS	L 0–54	
November 14	Lon Morris*	Campus Athletic Field; Lafayette, LA	L 7–18	
November 26	at Louisiana Normal	Demon Stadium; Natchitoches, LA	L 2–38	
*Non-conference game
