= Jack McGrath (American football) =

American football player and coach

Biographical details
- Born: c. 1906

Playing career
- 1926–1928: Notre Dame
- Position(s): Tackle, fullback

Coaching career (HC unless noted)
- 1929–1930: Louisville (assistant)
- 1931: Louisville

Head coaching record
- Overall: 0–8

Jack McGrath (c. 1906 – ?) was an American college football player and coach. He served as the head football coach at the University of Louisville in 1931, compiling a record of 0–8. McGrath played college football at the University of Notre Dame under head coach Knute Rockne.

== Head coaching record ==
Year	Team	Overall	Conference	Standing	Bowl/playoffs
Louisville Cardinals (Southern Intercollegiate Athletic Association) (1931)
1931	Louisville	0–8	0–5	32nd	
Louisville:		0–8	0–5		
Total:		0–8			
