= Truman F. Wilbanks =

American football player and coach (1891–1967)

Biographical details
- Born: September 27, 1891; Jena, Louisiana, U.S.
- Died: December 29, 1967 (aged 76); Mer Rouge, Louisiana, U.S.
- Education: Centenary (B.A., 1916)

Playing career
- 1917: LSU
- Position: Halfback

Coaching career (HC unless noted)
- ?–1935: Homer HS (LA)
- 1931–1936: Southwestern Louisiana

Head coaching record
- Overall: 19–32–2 (college)

Truman Franklin Wilbanks (September 27, 1891 – December 29, 1967) was an American football coach and educator. He served as the head football coach at the University of Louisiana at Lafayette (then known as Southwestern Louisiana Industrial Institute) from 1931 to 1936.

Wilbanks was born on September 27, 1891, in Jena, Louisiana, to Henry Gregg Wilbanks and Liza Bradford Wilbanks. He attended school in Jena. A 1916 graduate of Centenary College in Shreveport, Louisiana, Wilbanks played for the LSU Tigers football team, earning a letter in 1917 as a halfback. He and his wife, Ruth Kessinger, both taught at high schools in Homer and Baton Rouge, Louisiana.

Wilbanks died on December 29, 1967, in Mer Rouge, Louisiana, following a long illness.

== Head coaching record ==
=== College ===
| Year | Team | Overall | Conference | Standing | Bowl/playoffs |
|---|---|---|---|---|---|
Southwestern Louisiana Bulldogs (Southern Intercollegiate Athletic Association) (1931–1936)
| 1931 | Southwestern Louisiana | 1–6–1 | 1–4 | T–24th | |
| 1932 | Southwestern Louisiana | 3–4 | 1–3 | T–19th | |
| 1933 | Southwestern Louisiana | 6–3 | 3–2 | T–11th | |
| 1934 | Southwestern Louisiana | 5–4 | 2–3 | T–20th | |
| 1935 | Southwestern Louisiana | 2–8 | 1–4 | T–26th | |
| 1936 | Southwestern Louisiana | 2–7–1 | 0–4–1 | T–29th | |
| Southwestern Louisiana: | | 19–32–2 | 8–20–1 | | |
| Total: | | 19–32–2 | | | |
