= 1931 Mississippi State Teachers Yellow Jackets football team =

American college football season

1931 Mississippi State Teachers Yellow Jackets football
- Conference: Southern Intercollegiate Athletic Association
- Record: 2–5 (2–4 SIAA)
- Head coach: Pooley Hubert (1st season)
- Home stadium: State Teachers Field

1931 Southern Intercollegiate Athletic Association football standings
	Conf.					Overall
Team	W		L		T	W		L		T
Chattanooga $	8	–	0	–	0	9	–	2	–	0
Louisiana Tech	6	–	0	–	0	7	–	0	–	0
Centenary	3	–	0	–	0	5	–	5	–	0
Western Kentucky State Teachers	7	–	1	–	0	8	–	4	–	0
Centre	5	–	1	–	0	8	–	2	–	1
The Citadel	4	–	1	–	0	5	–	4	–	1
Howard (AL)	3	–	1	–	1	8	–	2	–	2
Mercer	6	–	2	–	0	7	–	2	–	1
Southwestern (TN)	3	–	1	–	1	4	–	2	–	3
Loyola (LA)	2	–	1	–	0	5	–	4	–	0
Georgetown (KY)	3	–	2	–	0	4	–	5	–	0
Birmingham–Southern	4	–	3	–	0	5	–	4	–	0
Mississippi College	4	–	3	–	0	5	–	4	–	0
Murray State	2	–	2	–	0	5	–	3	–	1
Union (TN)	4	–	4	–	0	5	–	4	–	0
Wofford	3	–	4	–	0	4	–	5	–	0
Miami (FL)	2	–	3	–	0	4	–	8	–	0
Spring Hill	2	–	3	–	0	3	–	6	–	0
Louisiana Normal	2	–	4	–	0	5	–	4	–	0
Millsaps	2	–	4	–	0	3	–	5	–	0
Eastern Kentucky State Teachers	1	–	2	–	0	2	–	5	–	1
Mississippi State Teachers	2	–	4	–	0	2	–	5	–	0
Middle Tennessee State Teachers	1	–	3	–	0	6	–	4	–	0
Presbyterian	1	–	4	–	1	2	–	5	–	2
Transylvania	1	–	4	–	0	2	–	7	–	0
SW Louisiana	1	–	4	–	0	1	–	6	–	1
Stetson	1	–	5	–	0	3	–	5	–	0
Erskine	1	–	5	–	1	2	–	6	–	3
Louisiana College	1	–	6	–	0	2	–	6	–	0
Rollins	0	–	1	–	0	6	–	1	–	0
Newberry	0	–	3	–	0	2	–	6	–	0
Louisville	0	–	5	–	0	0	–	8	–	0
$ – Conference champion

The 1931 Mississippi State Teachers Yellow Jackets football team was an American football team that represented the Mississippi State Teachers College (now known as the University of Southern Mississippi) as a member of the Southern Intercollegiate Athletic Association during the 1931 college football season. In their first year under head coach Pooley Hubert, the team compiled a 2–5 record.

== Schedule ==
Date	Opponent	Site	Result	Source
October 3	Millsaps	State Teachers Field; Hattiesburg, MS	L 0–19	
October 10	at Mississippi College	Provine Field; Clinton, MS	L 13–46	
October 17	at Spring Hill	Mobile, AL	L 2–12	
October 24	at Louisiana College	Alumni Field; Pineville, LA	L 0–13	
November 7	Southwestern (TN)	State Teachers Field; Hattiesburg, MS	W 13–7	
November 14	Louisiana Normal	State Teachers Field; Hattiesburg, MS	W 32–0	
November 21	Delta State*	Delta Field; Cleveland, MS	L 7–27	
*Non-conference game
