= 1942 Western Kentucky State Teachers Hilltoppers football team =

American college football season

1942 Western Kentucky State Teachers Hilltoppers football
- Conference: Kentucky Intercollegiate Athletic Conference
- Record: 3–4–1 (2–0–1 KIAC)
- Head coach: Arnold Winkenhofer (1st season)

The 1942 Western Kentucky State Teachers Hilltoppers football team represented Western Kentucky State Teachers College (now known as Western Kentucky University) as a member of the Kentucky Intercollegiate Athletic Conference (KIAC) during the 1942 college football season. Led by Arnold Winkenhofer in his first and only season as head coach, the Hilltoppers compiled an overall record of 3–4–1 with a mark of 2–0–1 in conference play.

Western Kentucky was ranked at No. 241 (out of 590 college and military teams) in the final rankings under the Litkenhous Difference by Score System for 1942.

== Schedule ==
Date	Opponent	Site	Result	Attendance	Source
September 26	at Ole Miss*	Hemingway Stadium; Oxford, MS	L 6–39	1,500	
October 3	Marshall*	Bowling Green, KY	W 19–13		
October 9	at Youngstown State*	Youngstown, OH	L 6–40		
October 17	Morehead State	Bowling Green, KY	W 9–0		
October 23	at Union (TN)*	Jackson, TN	L 0–38		
October 31	at Eastern Kentucky	Richmond, KY (rivalry)	L 0–18		
November 7	Tennessee Tech*^{†}	Bowling Green, KY	T 6–6		
November 21	at Murray State	Cutchin Stadium; Murray, KY (rivalry)	W 24–13		
*Non-conference game; ^{†}Homecoming
