= Ray G. Dauber =

- Dauber pictured in Jambalaya 1935, Tulane yearbook

Biographical details
- Born: October 24, 1903; Duluth, Minnesota, U.S.
- Died: February 7, 1965 (aged 61); Iowa City, Iowa, U.S.

Playing career

Football
- 1923–1925: Iowa

Coaching career (HC unless noted)

Football
- 1929–1930: Mississippi State (assistant)
- 1930: Western Reserve
- 1931–1932: Mississippi State
- ?–1935: Tulane (freshman)
- 1936–1937: Tulane (ends)

Basketball
- 1927–1933: Mississippi State
- 1933–1938: Tulane

Track
- 1925–1927: Western Reserve

Cross country
- 1926–1927: Western Reserve

Head coaching record
- Overall: 6–11 (football); 64–114 (basketball); 5–6 (track)

Raymond George Dauber (October 24, 1903 – February 7, 1965) was an American football player, track and field athlete, and coach of multiple sports. He served as the head football coach at Western Reserve University—now a part of Case Western Reserve University—for one game in 1930 and at Mississippi State University from 1931 to 1932, compiling a career college football record of 6–11 record. Dauber was also the head basketball coach at Mississippi State from 1927 to 1933 and at Tulane University from 1933 to 1938, tallying a career college basketball mark of 64–114. In addition, he coached track and cross country at Western Reserve in the mid-1920s.

Dauber was an All-American shot putter for the Iowa Hawkeyes track and field team, finishing seventh at the 1925 NCAA Track and Field Championships.

== Coaching career ==
Dauber served as an assistant football coach at Mississippi State from 1929 to 1930. In 1929, he and head coach John W. Hancock formed one of the youngest coaching staffs in the country. In 1934, he was serving as the freshman team coach at Tulane University. He was promoted to ends coach in 1936. Dauber also coached the Tulane basketball team. He resigned from Tulane in March 1938.

== Head coaching record ==
=== Football ===
Year	Team	Overall	Conference	Standing	Bowl/playoffs
Western Reserve Red Cats (Ohio Athletic Conference) (1930)
1930	Western Reserve	1–0 (Note: Gordon Locke coached the first three games of the season and Jack C. Davis coached the next four. Dauber coached only the season finale, a 13–6 victory over Case on November 27.)	1–0		
Western Reserve:		1–0	1–0		
Mississippi State Aggies/Maroons (Southern Conference) (1931–1932)
1931	Mississippi State	2–6	0–5	23rd	
1932	Mississippi State	3–5	0–4	T–21st	
Mississippi State:		5–11	0–9		
Total:		6–11			
