= Ernest R. Miller =

American educator and coach

Biographical details
- Born: April 9, 1892
- Died: March 31, 1987 (aged 94); Pompano Beach, Florida, U.S.
- Education: Cincinnati (1977, Ed.D.)

Coaching career (HC unless noted)

Football
- c. 1920: Ironton HS (OH)
- 1922: Wittenberg (assistant)
- 1923–1924: Defiance
- 1925: Alfred
- 1926: Kentucky Wesleyan (line)
- 1927: Kentucky Wesleyan
- 1929–1930: Ohio Northern
- 1932: Western Kentucky State Teachers

Basketball
- 1923–1925: Defiance
- 1927–1928: Kentucky Wesleyan

Baseball
- 1923: Wittenberg
- 1924–1925: Defiance
- 1930–1931: Ohio Northern

Head coaching record
- Overall: 30–27–2 (college football)

Accomplishments and honors

Championships
- Football; 1 SIAA (1932)

Ernest Ray Miller (April 9, 1892 – March 31, 1987) was an American educator and coach of football, basketball, and baseball. He served as the head football coach at Defiance College in Defiance, Ohio from 1923 to 1924, Alfred University in Alfred, New York in 1925, Kentucky Wesleyan College from 1926 to 1927, Ohio Northern University from 1929 to 1930, and Western Kentucky State Teachers College (now known as Western Kentucky University) in 1932.

Miller attended Ohio University and graduated from Rio Grande College—now known as the University of Rio Grande—in Rio Grande, Ohio. In 1977, Miller earned a Doctor of Education degree from the University of Cincinnati at the age of 81. He died on March 31, 1987, at a hospital in Pompano Beach, Florida.

== Head coaching record ==
=== College football ===
Year	Team	Overall	Conference	Standing	Bowl/playoffs
Defiance Yellow Jackets (Independent) (1923–1924)
1923	Defiance	3–4–1			
1924	Defiance	7–1			
Defiance:		10–5–1			
Alfred Saxons (Independent) (1925)
1925	Alfred	1–7			
Alfred:		1–7			
Kentucky Wesleyan Panthers (Southern Intercollegiate Athletic Association) (1927)
1927	Kentucky Wesleyan	6–3			
Kentucky Wesleyan:		6–3			
Ohio Northern Polar Bears (Ohio Athletic Conference) (1929–1930)
1929	Ohio Northern	2–6–1	0–4–1	15th	
1930	Ohio Northern	3–5	1–4	11th	
Ohio Northern:		5–11–1	1–8–1		
Western Kentucky State Teachers Hilltoppers (Southern Intercollegiate Athletic Association) (1932)
1932	Western Kentucky State Teachers	8–1	6–0	1st	
Western Kentucky State Teachers:		8–1	6–0		
Total:		30–27–2			
National championship Conference title Conference division title or championship game berth
