= Bowdon College =

Defunct college in Bowdon, Georgia

Bowdon College, established as Bowdon Collegiate Institution in 1856, was a college in Bowdon, Georgia and Georgia's first co-educational institution. It joined the state university system and was renamed Bowden State Normal and Industrial College. After being removed from the state system in 1933, the college closed in 1936.

== History ==
Bowdon Collegiate Institute was founded as a private institution in 1856 by Charles McDaniel and John Richardson. Starting in a two room log house in rural Bowdon, Georgia, the school was chartered the following year becoming Georgia's fifth chartered high-learning institution and first co-educational institution. With donated land, a new building was completed in 1859.

During the American Civil War, the school closed for a short time as most students and McDaniel joined the Confederate States Army. Of its 144 students, 128 and McDaniel died in the war. After the war in 1866, the George legislature passed a bill providing free tuition at institutions including Bowden for maimed or indigent former soldiers under 30.

In 1919, due to economic and financial issues, the state legislature passed a bill to place the school under University of Georgia's trustees and renamed it Bowden State Normal and Industrial College. The school remained part of the state system until 1933 when it was returned to private status as part of a consolidation effort during the Great Depression. It became a junior college but closed in 1936.

== Notable faculty ==
- John William Abercrombie served as Bowdon College's president from 1890 to 1891.
