= Roy C. Manchester =

American scouting executive

Roy C. Manchester (December 29, 1887 – October 10, 1975) was a Boy Scouts of America executive. He was born in Mount Carroll, Illinois and his parents were Lovania and Dr. Charles Manchester. He graduated from Findlay College in 1910 with an AB degree in physical education. After graduation, he became the director of the Bowling Green (KY) YMCA where he organized an early Boy Scout troop. He entered the Army Air Corps in 1917 and was stationed at Kelly Field in Texas. In 1919 he became executive of the Paducah Council, which was renamed McCracken County (1920), Chief Paducah (1925), and Four Rivers (1940) during his tenure. He remained a Scout executive for 34 years. The dining hall at Camp Pakentuck was named "Manchester Lodge" in his honor, and in 1979, the Four Rivers Scout Camp was renamed Camp Roy C. Manchester in his honor.
