= James Elam (American football) =

American football coach

Biographical details
- Education: Sewanee

Coaching career (HC unless noted)
- 1922: Tennessee Military Institute
- 1927–1929: Transylvania
- 1930–1931: Western Kentucky State Teachers

Head coaching record
- Overall: 30–21–4 (college)

James A. Elam was an American football coach. He served as the head football coach at Transylvania University in Lexington, Kentucky from 1927 to 1929 and Western Kentucky State Teachers College–—known as Western Kentucky University)—from 1930 to 1931.

Elam was a graduate of Sewanee: The University of the South.

== Head coaching record ==
=== College ===
Year	Team	Overall	Conference	Standing	Bowl/playoffs
Transylvania Pioneers (Southern Intercollegiate Athletic Association) (1927–1929)
1927	Transylvania	0–9	0–5		
1928	Transylvania	8–3	3–1	T–6th	
1929	Transylvania	6–4–3	2–1–2	T–11th	
Transylvania:		14–16–3	5–7–2		
Western Kentucky State Teachers Hilltoppers (Southern Intercollegiate Athletic Association) (1930–1931)
1930	Western Kentucky State Teachers	8–1–1	6–1	6th	
1931	Western Kentucky State Teachers	8–4	7–1	4th	
Western Kentucky State Teachers:		16–5–1	13–2		
Total:		30–21–4			
