= M. A. Leiper =

American football coach and professor

Biographical details
- Born: July 25, 1879; Malvern, Arkansas, U.S.
- Died: June 17, 1936 (aged 56); Warren County, Kentucky, U.S.
- Education: Columbia; Princeton

Coaching career (HC unless noted)
- 1913: Western Kentucky

Macon Anderson Leiper (July 25, 1879 – June 17, 1936) was an American football coach and college professor. He served as the head football coach at Western Kentucky University (then known as Western Normal School) during the 1913 college football season. Leiper also served as a professor of modern languages at WKU from 1908 until his death in 1936.
