= Arnold Winkenhofer =

American football player and coach (1905–1989)

Biographical details
- Born: August 30, 1905; Huntingburg, Indiana, U.S.
- Died: September 14, 1989 (aged 84); Smyrna, Georgia, U.S.

Playing career
- 1925–1928: Western Kentucky State Normal

Coaching career (HC unless noted)
- 1938–1941: Western Kentucky State Normal (assistant)
- 1942: Western Kentucky State Teachers

Head coaching record
- Overall: 3–4–1

Arnold "Winky" Winkenhofer (August 30, 1905 – September 14, 1989) was an American college football player and coach. He served as the head football coach at Western Kentucky State Teachers College in Bowling Green, Kentucky in 1942, compiling a record of 3–4–1, before the sport was halted at the school due to World War II. Winkenhofer was a four-time letter winner in football at Western Kentucky, from 1925 to 1928.

== Personal life ==
Winkenhofer was born on August 30, 1905, in Huntingburg, Indiana. He moved to Atlanta in 1941 and worked there for the American Red Cross until his retirement in 1970. Winkenhofer was also a pioneer in water safety. He died on September 14, 1989, at Smyrna Hospital in Smyrna, Georgia, after having suffered from Alzheimer's disease.

== Head coaching record ==
| Year | Team | Overall | Conference | Standing | Bowl/playoffs |
|---|---|---|---|---|---|
Western Kentucky Hilltoppers (Kentucky Intercollegiate Athletic Conference) (1942)
| 1942 | Western Kentucky State Teachers | 3–4–1 | 2–2–1 | | |
| Western Kentucky: | | 3–4–1 | 2–2–1 | | |
| Total: | | 3–4–1 | | | |
