= Edmund Orgill Trophy =

Athletic award

- Teams: Sewanee Tigers; Rhodes Lynx
- First meeting: November 3, 1899; Sewanee 54, SPU 0
- Latest meeting: November 7, 2026; Rhodes 39, Sewanee 37
- Next meeting: 2027 (Memphis, TN)
- Trophy: Edmund Orgill Trophy

Statistics
- Total meetings: 93
- All-time series: Tied, 45–45–3
- Trophy series: Rhodes leads, 40–31–1
- Largest victory: Sewanee, 64–0 (1909)
- Longest win streak: Sewanee, 6 (1899–1924, 1961–1966, 1978–1983); Rhodes, 6 (1984–1989, 2012–2017)
- Current win streak: Rhodes, 1 (2026)

Locations in Tennessee

The Edmund Orgill Trophy is awarded to the winner of the annual football game between Rhodes College and Sewanee: The University of the South. The rivalry between Rhodes and Sewanee was reported by Sports Illustrated in 2012 to be "the longest continuously running rivalry in college football in the Southern United States". Although the first game was played in 1899, the teams have not met in every season. The Orgill Trophy was added to the series in 1954. Rhodes currently leads the trophy series 40–31–1, while the all-time series is tied at 45-45-3.

== Game Results ==
| Sewanee victories | Rhodes victories | Tie games |

| No. | Date | Location | Winning team | | Losing team | |
|---|---|---|---|---|---|---|
| 1 | November 3, 1899 | Sewanee, TN | Sewanee | 54 | SPU | 0 |
| 2 | October 17, 1901 | Sewanee, TN | Sewanee | 40 | SPU | 0 |
| 3 | October 13, 1906 | Sewanee, TN | Sewanee | 57 | SPU | 0 |
| 4 | October 9, 1909 | Sewanee, TN | Sewanee | 64 | SPU | 0 |
| 5 | October 6, 1923 | Sewanee, TN | Sewanee | 34 | SPU | 0 |
| 6 | Septemb 27, 1924 | Sewanee, TN | Sewanee | 7 | SPU | 0 |
| 7 | November 9, 1929 | Memphis, TN | SAM | 9 | Sewanee | 0 |
| 8 | November 22, 1930 | Sewanee, TN | SAM | 26 | Sewanee | 6 |
| 9 | October 3, 1931 | Memphis, TN | Tie | 0 | Tie | 0 |
| 10 | October 15, 1932 | Memphis, TN | Sewanee | 8 | SPU | 6 |
| 11 | October 14, 1933 | Memphis, TN | Sewanee | 12 | SPU | 7 |
| 12 | September 29, 1934 | Memphis, TN | SAM | 2 | Sewanee | 0 |
| 13 | September 30, 1938 | Memphis, TN | SAM | 47 | Sewanee | 0 |
| 14 | October 27, 1939 | Memphis, TN | Sewanee | 6 | SAM | 0 |
| 15 | October 18, 1941 | Memphis, TN | SAM | 35 | Sewanee | 0 |
| 16 | October 25, 1947 | Sewanee, TN | Sewanee | 8 | SAM | 0 |
| 17 | October 2, 1948 | Tuscumbia, AL | Sewanee | 20 | SAM | 0 |
| 18 | October 1, 1949 | Decatur, AL | Tie | 7 | Tie | 7 |
| 19 | October 7, 1950 | Memphis, TN | Sewanee | 25 | SAM | 6 |
| 20 | November 1, 1952 | Sewanee, TN | Sewanee | 35 | SAM | 0 |
| 21 | November 14, 1953 | Sewanee, TN | Sewanee | 41 | SAM | 0 |
| 22 | November 13, 1954 | Memphis, TN | SAM | 32 | Sewanee | 19 |
| 23 | September 24, 1955 | Memphis, TN | SAM | 18 | Sewanee | 7 |
| 24 | September 22, 1956 | Sewanee, TN | SAM | 27 | Sewanee | 7 |
| 25 | November 16, 1957 | Memphis, TN | Sewanee | 34 | SAM | 12 |
| 26 | November 15, 1958 | Sewanee, TN | Sewanee | 47 | SAM | 0 |
| 27 | November 7, 1959 | Memphis, TN | Sewanee | 21 | SAM | 19 |
| 28 | November 5, 1960 | Sewanee, TN | SAM | 7 | Sewanee | 0 |
| 29 | November 4, 1961 | Memphis, TN | Sewanee | 27 | SAM | 12 |
| 30 | November 3, 1962 | Sewanee, TN | Sewanee | 44 | SAM | 0 |
| 31 | November 2, 1963 | Memphis, TN | Sewanee | 28 | SAM | 0 |
| 32 | October 31, 1964 | Sewanee, TN | Sewanee | 34 | SAM | 0 |
| 33 | October 30, 1965 | Memphis, TN | Sewanee | 41 | SAM | 6 |
| 34 | October 29, 1966 | Sewanee, TN | Sewanee | 16 | SAM | 14 |
| 35 | October 28, 1967 | Memphis, TN | SAM | 31 | Sewanee | 16 |
| 36 | October 26, 1968 | Sewanee, TN | Sewanee | 28 | SAM | 14 |
| 37 | October 25, 1969 | Memphis, TN | SAM | 36 | Sewanee | 22 |
| 38 | October 24, 1970 | Sewanee, TN | SAM | 21 | Sewanee | 19 |
| 39 | October 23, 1971 | Memphis, TN | SAM | 9 | Sewanee | 7 |
| 40 | October 21, 1972 | Sewanee, TN | Sewanee | 14 | SAM | 6 |
| 41 | October 20, 1973 | Memphis, TN | SAM | 20 | Sewanee | 6 |
| 42 | October 19, 1974 | Sewanee, TN | Sewanee | 7 | SAM | 0 |
| 43 | October 18, 1975 | Memphis, TN | Sewanee | 15 | SAM | 14 |
| 44 | October 16, 1976 | Sewanee, TN | Sewanee | 22 | SAM | 18 |
| 45 | October 15, 1977 | Memphis, TN | SAM | 47 | Sewanee | 12 |
| 46 | October 14, 1978 | Sewanee, TN | Sewanee | 28 | SAM | 13 |
| 47 | October 13, 1979 | Memphis, TN | Sewanee | 3 | SAM | 0 |

| No. | Date | Location | Winning team | | Losing team | |
|---|---|---|---|---|---|---|
| 48 | October 11, 1980 | Sewanee, TN | Sewanee | 24 | SAM | 13 |
| 49 | October 10, 1981 | Memphis, TN | Sewanee | 23 | SAM | 14 |
| 50 | October 9, 1982 | Sewanee, TN | Sewanee | 20 | SAM | 17 |
| 51 | October 8, 1983 | Memphis, TN | Sewanee | 19 | SAM | 13 |
| 52 | October 6, 1984 | Sewanee, TN | Rhodes | 38 | Sewanee | 14 |
| 53 | October 12, 1985 | Memphis, TN | Rhodes | 20 | Sewanee | 7 |
| 54 | October 11, 1986 | Sewanee, TN | Rhodes | 28 | Sewanee | 7 |
| 55 | October 10, 1987 | Memphis, TN | Rhodes | 24 | Sewanee | 21 |
| 56 | October 8, 1988 | Sewanee, TN | Rhodes | 17 | Sewanee | 2 |
| 57 | October 7, 1989 | Memphis, TN | Rhodes | 16 | Sewanee | 14 |
| 58 | October 6, 1990 | Sewanee, TN | Sewanee | 7 | Rhodes | 6 |
| 59 | October 12, 1991 | Memphis, TN | Tie | 14 | Tie | 14 |
| 60 | October 17, 1992 | Sewanee, TN | Sewanee | 27 | Rhodes | 17 |
| 61 | October 16, 1993 | Memphis, TN | Rhodes | 31 | Sewanee | 13 |
| 62 | October 15, 1994 | Sewanee, TN | Sewanee | 19 | Rhodes | 17 |
| 63 | October 14, 1995 | Memphis, TN | Rhodes | 17 | Sewanee | 13 |
| 64 | October 19, 1996 | Sewanee, TN | Rhodes | 16 | Sewanee | 12 |
| 65 | October 18, 1997 | Memphis, TN | Rhodes | 27 | Sewanee | 17 |
| 66 | October 17, 1998 | Sewanee, TN | Rhodes | 34 | Sewanee | 26 |
| 67 | October 16, 1999 | Memphis, TN | Rhodes | 23 | Sewanee | 21 |
| 68 | October 14, 2000 | Sewanee, TN | Sewanee | 32 | Rhodes | 6 |
| 69 | October 13, 2001 | Memphis, TN | Sewanee | 21 | Rhodes | 14 |
| 70 | October 19, 2002 | Sewanee, TN | Sewanee | 36 | Rhodes | 31 |
| 71 | October 18, 2003 | Memphis, TN | Rhodes | 34 | Sewanee | 14 |
| 72 | October 16, 2004 | Sewanee, TN | Rhodes | 28 | Sewanee | 14 |
| 73 | November 12, 2005 | Memphis, TN | Sewanee | 25 | Rhodes | 22 |
| 74 | November 11, 2006 | Sewanee, TN | Rhodes | 14 | Sewanee | 7 |
| 75 | November 10, 2007 | Memphis, TN | Rhodes | 15 | Sewanee | 13 |
| 76 | November 15, 2008 | Sewanee, TN | Rhodes | 17 | Sewanee | 0 |
| 77 | November 14, 2009 | Memphis, TN | Rhodes | 19 | Sewanee | 16 |
| 78 | November 13, 2010 | Sewanee, TN | Rhodes | 20 | Sewanee | 16 |
| 79 | October 29, 2011 | Memphis, TN | Sewanee | 34 | Rhodes | 7 |
| 80 | October 27, 2012 | Sewanee, TN | Rhodes | 14 | Sewanee | 10 |
| 81 | October 12, 2013 | Memphis, TN | Rhodes | 50 | Sewanee | 23 |
| 82 | October 11, 2014 | Sewanee, TN | Rhodes | 40 | Sewanee | 22 |
| 83 | October 3, 2015 | Memphis, TN | Rhodes | 28 | Sewanee | 10 |
| 84 | October 1, 2016 | Sewanee, TN | Rhodes | 36 | Sewanee | 21 |
| 85 | October 28, 2017 | Memphis, TN | Rhodes | 28 | Sewanee | 10 |
| 86 | October 27, 2018 | Sewanee, TN | Sewanee | 27 | Rhodes | 14 |
| 87 | September 28, 2019 | Memphis, TN | Rhodes | 14 | Sewanee | 3 |
| 88 | October 9, 2021 | Sewanee, TN | Rhodes | 55 | Sewanee | 13 |
| 89 | October 29, 2022 | Memphis, TN | Rhodes | 33 | Sewanee | 6 |
| 90 | October 14, 2023 | Memphis, TN | Rhodes | 30 | Sewanee | 10 |
| 91 | October 26, 2024 | Sewanee, TN | Sewanee | 31 | Rhodes | 7 |
| 92 | October 25, 2025 | Memphis, TN | Sewanee | 28 | Rhodes | 6 |
| 93 | November 7, 2026 | Sewanee, TN | Rhodes | 39 | Sewanee | 37 |
Series: Tied 45–45–3

== See also ==
- List of NCAA college football rivalry games
