= 1931 Spring Hill Badgers football team =

American college football season

1931 Spring Hill Badgers football
- Conference: Dixie Conference
- Record: 3–6 (0–3 Dixie)
- Head coach: Pat Browne (1st season)

1931 Dixie Conference football standings
	Conf.					Overall
Team	W		L		T	W		L		T
Chattanooga $	4	–	0	–	0	9	–	2	–	0
Southwestern (TN)	2	–	0	–	1	4	–	2	–	3
Howard (AL)	3	–	1	–	1	8	–	2	–	2
Centre	1	–	1	–	0	8	–	2	–	1
Mississippi College	1	–	1	–	0	5	–	4	–	0
Birmingham–Southern	2	–	3	–	0	5	–	4	–	0
Mercer	1	–	2	–	0	7	–	2	–	1
Millsaps	0	–	3	–	0	3	–	5	–	0
Spring Hill	0	–	3	–	0	3	–	6	–	0
$ – Conference champion

The 1931 Spring Hill Badgers football team was an American football team that represented Spring Hill College as a member of the Dixie Conference during the 1931 college football season. In their first year under head coach Pat Browne, the team compiled a 3–6 record.

== Schedule ==
Date	Opponent	Site	Result	Attendance	Source
September 26	Marion*	Mobile, AL	W 53–0		
October 4	at LSU*	Tiger Stadium; Baton Rouge, LA	L 0–35		
October 10	at Tulane*	Tulane Stadium; New Orleans, LA	L 0–40		
October 17	Mississippi State Teachers*	Mobile, AL	W 12–2		
October 24	at Southwestern Louisiana*	Campus Athletic Field; Lafayette, LA	W 25–0		
October 31	at Auburn*	Drake Field; Auburn, AL	L 7–27		
November 6	vs. Howard (AL)	Cramton Bowl; Montgomery, AL	L 0–10	2,000	
November 11	Birmingham–Southern	Mobile, AL	L 0–6		
November 26	at Southwestern (TN)	Hodges Field; Memphis, TN	L 0–13	2,500	
*Non-conference game
