= Pennsylvania Route 188 =

State highway in Greene County, Pennsylvania, US

Pennsylvania Route 188

Route information
- Maintained by PennDOT
- Length: 9.747 mi (15.686 km)

Major junctions
- West end: US 19 / PA 21 in Morrisville
- East end: PA 88 in Dry Tavern

Location
- Country: United States
- State: Pennsylvania
- Counties: Greene

Highway system
- Pennsylvania State Route System; Interstate; US; State; Scenic; Legislative
← PA 187	→ PA 189

Pennsylvania Route 188 (PA 188) is a 9.7-mile (15.6 km) long east-west state highway in the U.S. state of Pennsylvania. The western terminus of the route is at U.S. Route 19 (US 19) and PA 21 in Morrisville. The eastern terminus is at PA 88 in the Jefferson Township community of Dry Tavern.

== Route description ==
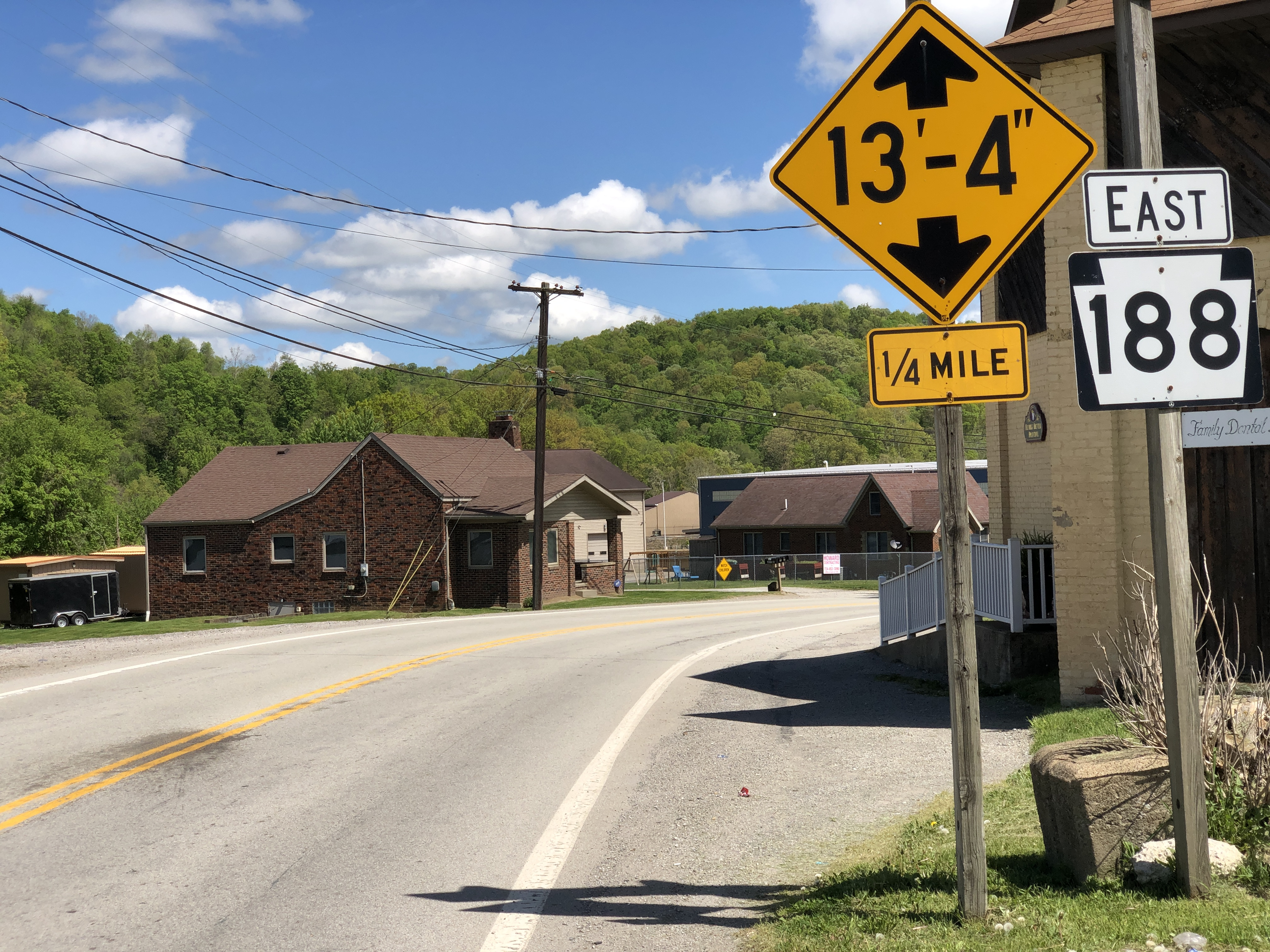
PA 188 eastbound past US 19/PA 21 in Morrisville

According to documentation from the Pennsylvania Department of Transportation, PA 188 begins at an intersection with US 19 and PA 21 in the community of Morrisville in Franklin Township. According to signage, PA 188 begins at an intersection with PA 21 about 800 feet (240 m) to the east of the official terminus. The road heads northeast on two-lane undivided Jefferson Road. The road runs through commercial areas and crosses under Norfolk Southern's Mon Line before passing near a park and crossing under I-79. From here, the route passes through a mix of woods and development, passing to the north of State Correctional Institution – Greene. PA 188 continues northeast through a mix of farmland and woodland with some homes as it continues into Morgan Township. The route turns east and intersects PA 221, passing Greene County Memorial Park before continuing into wooded areas. The road crosses the Norfolk Southern railroad line and the South Fork Tenmile Creek into Jefferson Township before turning northeast again and entering the borough of Jefferson. In this borough, PA 188 passes a mix of homes and businesses. Upon crossing back into Jefferson Township, the route winds east through farms and forests with a few residences. PA 188 reaches its eastern terminus at an intersection with PA 88 in the community of Dry Tavern.

== Major intersections ==
The entire route is in Greene County.

Location	mi	km	Destinations	Notes
Franklin Township	0.000	0.000	US 19 / PA 21 (East High Street) – Waynesboro, Mount Morris, Masontown	Western terminus
Morgan Township	4.229	6.806	PA 221 north (Lippencott Road) – Lippencott	Southern terminus of PA 221
Jefferson Township	9.747	15.686	PA 88 (North Eighty Eight Road) – Fredericktown, Carmichaels	Eastern terminus
1.000 mi = 1.609 km; 1.000 km = 0.621 mi
