= Jefferson, Pennsylvania =

Jefferson, Pennsylvania may refer to:

- Jefferson Hills, Pennsylvania, formerly known as Jefferson
- Jefferson, Greene County, Pennsylvania
- Jefferson, York County, Pennsylvania
- Jefferson County, Pennsylvania

== See also ==
- Jefferson Township, Pennsylvania (disambiguation)
