= Jefferson-Morgan Middle/Senior High School =

School in Pennsylvania, United States

Coordinates: 39.92825°N 80.06407°W

Location
- 1351 Jefferson Road; Jefferson, Greene County, Pennsylvania 15344-0158; United States

Information
- School type: Public Middle/Senior High School Public
- Motto: Rocket Pride
- School board: Jefferson-Morgan School Board
- School district: Jefferson-Morgan
- NCES District ID: 4212390
- Superintendent: Brandon Robinson
- NCES School ID: 421239002280
- Principal: Wesley Loring
- Staff: 36 (2022)
- Teaching staff: 29.85 (FTE)
- Grades: 7–12
- Enrollment: 373 (2023–2024)
- International students: 0
- Average class size: 15
- Student to teacher ratio: 12.50
- Language: English
- Colors: Orange and Black
- Fight song: Washington and Lee Swing
- Athletics conference: PIAA District VII / WPIAL
- Nickname: JM or Rockets
- Team name: Rockets
- Newspaper: The Rocket Reporter
- Yearbook: Jeffersonian
- Communities served: Clarksville, Jefferson, Rices Landing
- Feeder schools: Jefferson-Morgan Elementary School
- Alumni: Pam Snyder, Cary Kolat, Dick Gray, Ron Nyswaner
- Website: https://hsms.jmsd.org/

Jefferson-Morgan Middle/Senior High School is a small, rural, public school in the Jefferson-Morgan School District. It is located in Jefferson, Pennsylvania, about 55 miles (90 km) south of Pittsburgh in northeastern Greene County. Enrollment was 320 students in grades 7–12 in the 2018–2019 school year.

== Extracurriculars ==
Jefferson-Morgan School District offers a variety of clubs, activities and an extensive sports program.

=== Clubs and activities ===
The activities offered through the school include: SADD, Yearbook, National Honor Society, Drama Club, Student Council, Principal Advisory Council, Foreign Language Club, Varsity Club, Library Club, Big Brothers/Big Sisters, Debate Team, Academic Team, School Newspaper, Science Olympiad, Envirothon, and Youth Traffic Safety Council.

The Jefferson-Morgan Middle/Senior High School music program consists of a concert band, 2 choruses (one for students in middle school and the other for students in senior high), and the Jefferson-Morgan "Rocket" Marching Band. The marching band is made up of students in grade 7–12, and consists of musicians, band front, and an honor guard. They perform throughout the year at school, community, and athletic events, most notably at all Rocket varsity home and away football games and various noncompetitive high school band festivals each fall. The music department also frequently goes on trips in the spring. The band boosters and chorus boosters are both active in helping out with travel and various performances, as well as providing t-shirts, letter jackets, snacks, and other items to the marching band each season.

=== Athletics ===
Jefferson-Morgan High School is a member of the Pennsylvania Interscholastic Athletic Association (PIAA) and the Western Pennsylvania Interscholastic Athletic League (WPIAL). Jefferson-Morgan is in PIAA District 7. As of 2016, most of the high school's athletic teams compete in the Tri-County South conference of Class 1A, the smallest of 6 classifications, with the exception of the boys' basketball program, which is in 2A.

Sport Name	Boys	Girls
Baseball	Class A	
Basketball	Class A	Class A
Football	Class A	
Golf	Class AAAA	Class AAAA
Softball		Class A
Track and Field	Class AA	Class AA
Volleyball		Class A
Wrestling	Class AA	

=== Middle School Sports ===
Jefferson-Morgan students in grades 7–8 can participate in a select few athletics:

- basketball
- football
- softball
- volleyball
- wrestling
