= Pumpkin Run (Monongahela River tributary) =

River in Pennsylvania

Pumpkin Run Tributary to Monongahela River
- Location of Pumpkin Run mouth Pumpkin Run (Monongahela River tributary) (the United States)

Location
- Country: United States of America
- State: Pennsylvania
- County: Greene
- Township: Jefferson
- Borough: Rices Landing

Physical characteristics
- Source: divide between Pumpkin Run and South Fork of Tenmile Creek
  - location: about 1 mile east of Jefferson, Pennsylvania
  - coordinates: 39°55′28″N 080°02′09″W
  - elevation: 1,140 ft (350 m)
- Mouth: Monongahela River
  - location: Rices Landing, Pennsylvania
  - coordinates: 39°57′01″N 080°00′00″W
  - elevation: 763 ft (233 m)
- Length: 5.37 mi (8.64 km)
- Basin size: 5.81 square miles (15.0 km^{2})
- Discharge
  - average: 7.28 cu ft/s (0.206 m^{3}/s) at mouth with Monongahela River

Basin features
- Progression: generally north
- River system: Monongahela River
- Tributaries
  - left: unnamed tributaries
  - right: unnamed tributaries

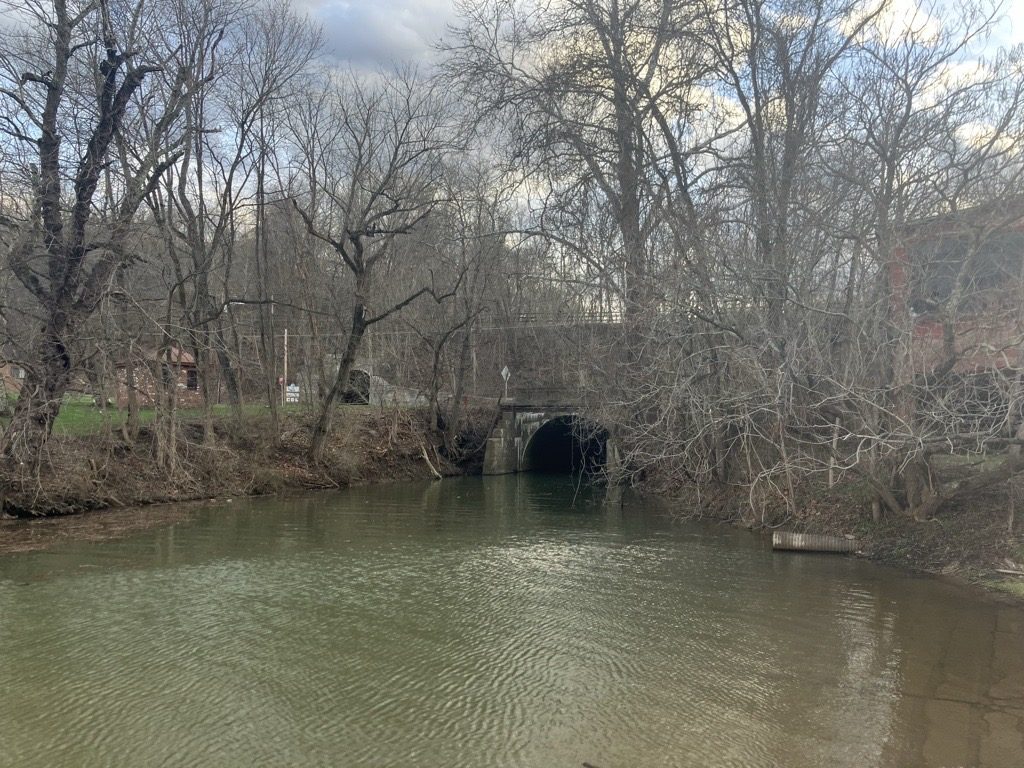
Confluence of Pumpkin Run with the Monongahela River. The upper tunnel crosses under the Greene River Trail and leads to Pumpkin Run Park.

Pumpkin Run is a tributary to the Monongahela River in southwestern Pennsylvania. The stream rises in northeastern Greene and flows north entering the Monongahela River at Rices Landing, Pennsylvania. The watershed is roughly 31% agricultural, 58% forested and the rest is other uses. The population in the watershed is 931 (2010).
