= Pam Snyder =

American politician (born 1955)

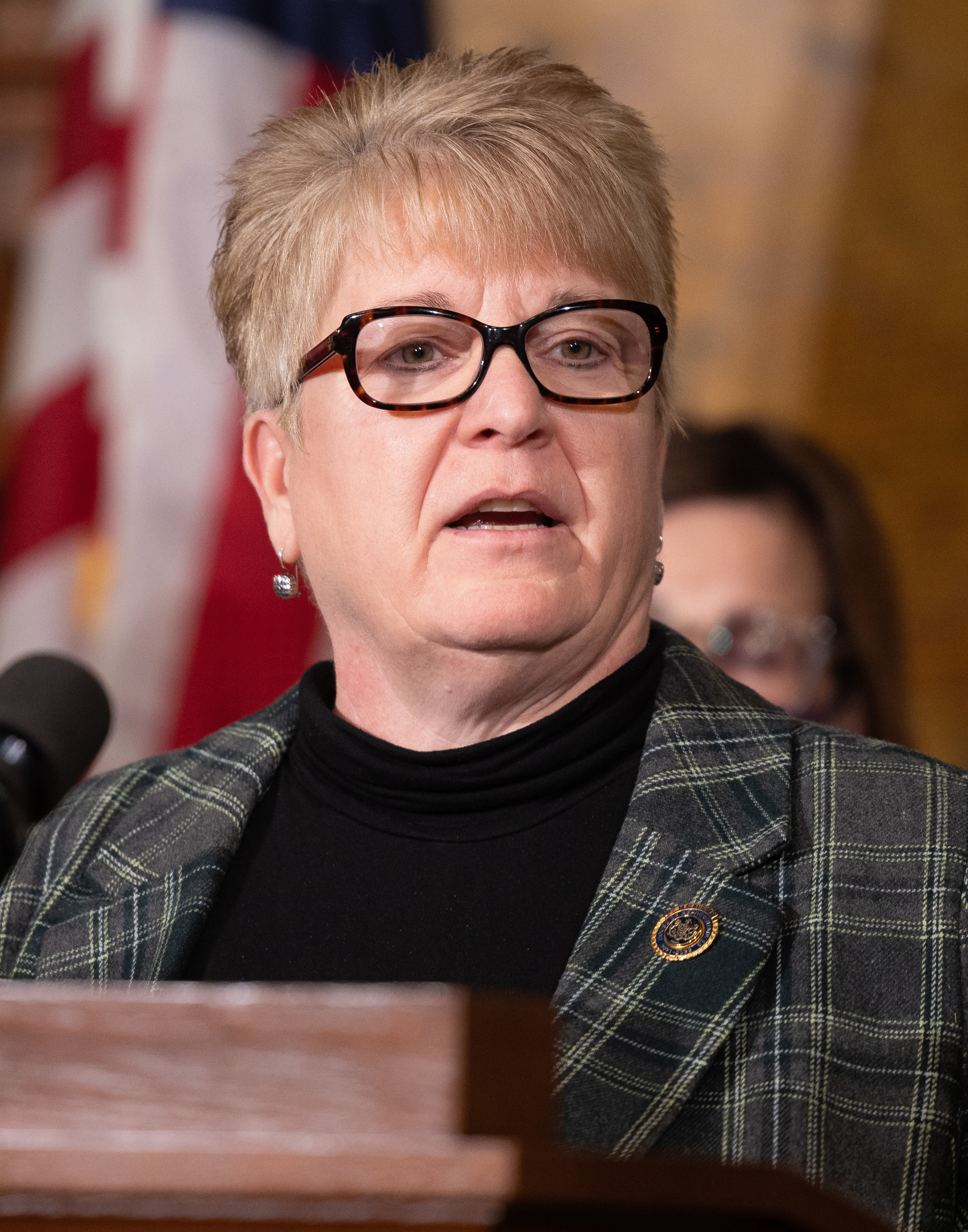
- Snyder in 2022

Member of the Pennsylvania House of Representatives from the 50th district
- In office January 1, 2013 – November 30, 2022
- Preceded by: Bill DeWeese
- Succeeded by: Bud Cook

Personal details
- Born: November 20, 1955 (age 70) Dry Tavern, Pennsylvania
- Party: Democratic
- Education: Waynesburg University
- Alma mater: Jefferson-Morgan Middle/Senior High School

Pamela M. Snyder (born November 20, 1955) is a former Democratic member of the Pennsylvania House of Representatives, serving from 2013 until 2022. She represented the 50th district. Snyder previously served for nine years as a Greene County Commissioner.

== Biography ==
A native of Greene County, Pennsylvania, Snyder graduated from Jefferson-Morgan High School. She attended the County Leadership Training Institute at New York University's Robert F. Wagner Graduate School of Public Service. Before being elected state representative, Snyder served for 6 years as the Chief Office Deputy in the Greene County Sheriff's Office in the 1980s. From 1990 to 1992, she worked for the Greene County Commissioners as an administrative assistant; following her time with the commissioners' unit she worked as an Assistant Project Engineer, from 1992 to 1994, for The Whiting-Turner Contracting Company Snyder spent nine years as a commissioner to Greene County Board of Commissioners, serving as its chairwoman throughout her tenure on the board.

Snyder was employed as the senior aide to U.S Representative Frank Mascara from 1994 to 2002. During that time, Mascara represented the 20th district, which turned into the 18th district after the 2000 census, covering parts of the Greene, Allegheny, Fayette, Washington, and Westmoreland counties. Snyder was elected state representative in November 2012, defeating Republican Mark Fischer, a Waynesburg businessman and borough councilman. She succeeded H. William DeWeese, who resigned his seat after being convicted of five felony charges of conflict of interest, theft and criminal conspiracy on accusations that two members of his staff used state resources to campaign for political office.

== Career ==
=== Committee assignments ===
- Agriculture & Rural Affairs
- Consumer Affairs
- Environmental Resources & Energy
- Labor & Industry
