= Morrisville, Pennsylvania =

Morrisville is the name of some places in the U.S. state of Pennsylvania:

- Morrisville, Bucks County, Pennsylvania, a borough
- Morrisville, Greene County, Pennsylvania, a census-designated place
