= Crucible, Pennsylvania =

Unincorporated community in Pennsylvania, US

- Census-designated place
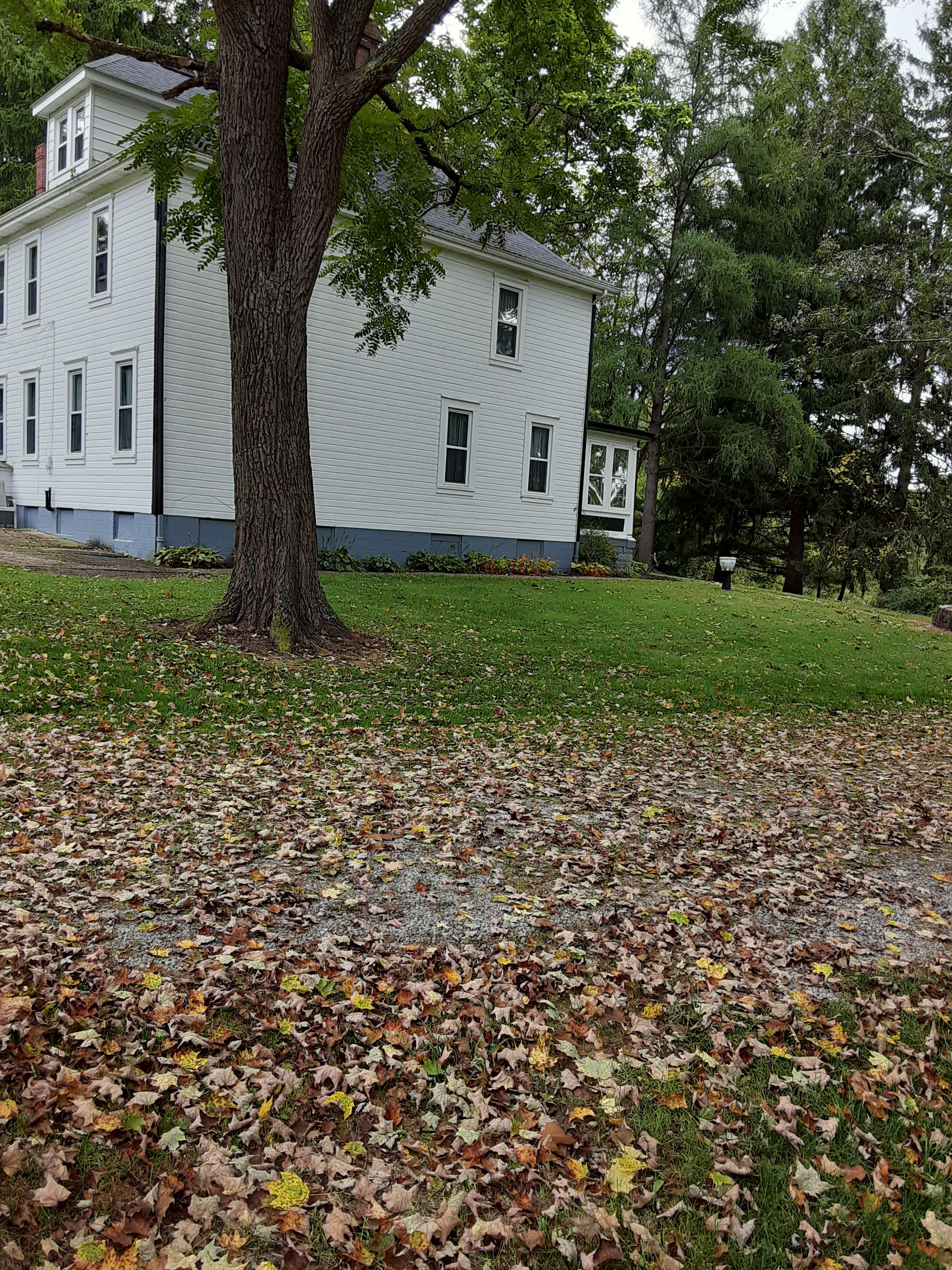
- Mine Superintendent's Home, built 1914

- Location within Pennsylvania Location within the United States
- Coordinates: 39°56′54″N 79°57′53″W
- Country: United States
- State: Pennsylvania
- County: Greene
- Township: Cumberland

Area
  - Total: 1.27 sq mi (3.28 km^{2})
  - Land: 1.15 sq mi (2.98 km^{2})
  - Water: 0.11 sq mi (0.29 km^{2})
- Elevation: 1,076 ft (328 m)

Population (2020)
  - Total: 673
  - Density: 584.1/sq mi (225.53/km^{2})
- Time zone: UTC-5 (Eastern (EST))
  - Summer (DST): UTC-4 (EDT)
- ZIP code: 15325
- FIPS code: 42-17528
- GNIS feature ID: 1172786

Crucible is a census-designated place and coal town in Greene County, Pennsylvania, United States. Their post office opened in 1914. The 2010 census reported Crucible with a population of 725. 70.6% of households are families, with an average family size of 3.02.

== History ==
The community of Crucible was built around a coal mine operated by Crucible Coal, Co. Some sources cite that the mine opened in 1910, but others claim that the official opening was in 1913 after the sale of 2,000 acres (810 ha) to Crucible Coal, Co. Crucible had many features typical of a coal town, including company housing, a company store, and a post office. At its peak in 1953, the mine employed 903 people. Over the course of its operation, the mine produced 36.5 million tons of coal. The mine closed in 1961.

The community of Crucible had its own school, which operated under the umbrella of the Carmichaels Area School District, until the 1991-1992 school year, when the new elementary school in Carmichaels opened. The school has subsequently been shut down, but had been used as a haunted house for fundraisers and as a training facility for the local volunteer fire department; it has been demolished.

== Geography ==
Crucible is located in northeastern Greene County, in the northern part of Cumberland Township, on the south side of the Monongahela River. The CDP begins at the riverbank and extends south up the 200-foot-high (60 m) river bluff to a plateau where most of the houses are located. The borough of Rices Landing is 2 miles (3 km) to the west, and Carmichaels is 4 miles (6 km) to the south.

According to the U.S. Census Bureau, the Crucible CDP has a total area of 1.3 square miles (3.3 km^{2}), of which 1.2 square miles (3.0 km^{2}) are land and 0.1 square miles (0.3 km^{2}), or 8.91%, are water.

== Demographics ==
Historical population
Census	Pop.	Note	%±
2010	725		—
2020	673		−7.2%
U.S. Decennial Census

== Today ==
There are multiple types of homes in the "patch", including one-story single family homes, two-story single family homes, and two-story multiple family homes, or duplexes. Some, if not many, of the homes were built around 1913, when the mine opened. The 2010 census reports that there were 315 housing units at the time of the survey.

The Department of Health currently classifies Crucible, as well as some of the surrounding areas in Greene County, as a medically underserved area. The Census Bureau's 2011-2015 American Community Survey 5-Year estimates show an unemployment rate of 16.9%. It also reports an average household income of $44,884, but a per capita income of only $14,577. 30.7% of families have had their incomes below the federal poverty level in the past 12 months, and 44.6% of families have received SNAP/food stamp benefits in the past 12 months.

The community currently has a post office, a playground, and two citizen's clubs. The community had a very active volunteer fire department that was ultimately disbanded in April 2023.

The churches in Crucible have been closed, including St. Mary's Catholic Church, although its cemetery is still maintained. Churches nearby, include Greene Valley Church of God and Hewitt Presbyterian Church. There are no stores in Crucible, but residents can travel to nearby Dry Tavern or Carmichaels for grocery stores and pharmacies. There are no restaurants in Crucible, but the Crucible Citizens Club and the Slovak Club offer members a place to grab a drink and a bite to eat.

== Notable person ==
- Frank Filchock, American and Canadian football player and coach.
