= Dick Gray =

American baseball player (1931–2013)

- Richard Benjamin Gray
- Third baseman
- Born: July 11, 1931; Jefferson, Greene County, Pennsylvania, U.S.
- Died: July 8, 2013 (aged 81); Anaheim, California, U.S.
- Batted: Right Threw: Right

MLB debut
- April 15, 1958, for the Los Angeles Dodgers

Last MLB appearance
- May 22, 1960, for the St. Louis Cardinals

MLB statistics
- Batting average: .239
- Home runs: 12
- Runs scored: 43
- Stats at Baseball Reference

Teams
- Los Angeles Dodgers (1958–1959); St. Louis Cardinals (1959–1960)

Richard Benjamin Gray (July 11, 1931 – July 8, 2013) was an American professional baseball player. He was an infielder in Major League Baseball, playing mainly as a third baseman for the Los Angeles Dodgers and St. Louis Cardinals from 1958 through 1960. Listed at 5 feet 11 inches (1.80 m) tall and 165 pounds (75 kg), he batted and threw right handed.

Gray is best known as the player who hit the first home run in Los Angeles Dodgers' history and the first to homer in their opening game at LA Memorial Coliseum.

== Early life ==
Born in Jefferson, Pennsylvania, Gray started playing sandlot ball at an early age with his neighborhood friends. He attended Jefferson High School in Pennsylvania, where he formed part of the baseball, football and wrestling teams. He graduated from Jefferson in June 1949 and immediately started his professional baseball career.

== Professional career ==
At age 18, Gray attended a Brooklyn Dodgers' tryout camp at Dodgertown in Vero Beach, Florida, during 1949 spring training. Signed by Brooklyn, he played in their minor league system from 1950 to 1952 at three different levels.

Gray reported to Class D Sheboygan Indians in 1950, batting a .310 average and 11 home runs in 122 games. In 1951 he spent time with two clubs, hitting .221 in 21 games for the Greenwood Dodgers and made 110 appearances with the Valdosta Dodgers, batting for them .302 with six home runs, while leading the Georgia–Florida League in runs scored with 118 and also played third base for the All-Star team. Promoted to Class B Miami Sun Sox in 1952 he dropped to a .240 average with three homers in 153 games.

But, like many baseball players, Gray had his career interrupted during the Korean War, missing two years after enlisting in the United States Army.

"I did not go to Korea," he explained in one interview. "I was fortunate and contracted pneumonia and I went to the hospital, the outfit that I was with finished their basic training and went to Korea. I stayed at Fort Leonard Wood in Missouri and I played baseball there for two years. On our ball club in the service we had about six or seven guys that went on to play in the major leagues. Whitey Herzog was on our team. I really grew up a lot in those two years in the service."

Following his discharge in 1955, he joined the Fort Worth Cats of the Texas League for two seasons. In 1955 he batted .251 with six home runs and 50 runs batted in, and improved to .285 with 24 homers and 91 RBIs in 155 games during the 1956 season.

In 1957, Gray gained a promotion to the Triple-A St. Paul Saints of the American Association, where he posted career-numbers with a .297 average and 111 RBIs, while batting 16 home runs and ending third for the most RBIs behind Marv Throneberry (124) and Norm Siebern (118). After the season ended, the parent Dodgers moved from Brooklyn to Los Angeles.

=== Two 'firsts' for the Los Angeles Dodgers ===
In 1958, Gray was the regular third baseman for the Dodgers in their opening series against the San Francisco Giants at Seals Stadium. On April 16, in the second game of the series, the Dodgers crushed the Giants, 13–1. In the second inning of that game, Gray belted a two-run homer off Ramón Monzant to become the first player to hit a home run in Los Angeles Dodger history.

On April 18, 1958, the Dodgers played their first home game at LA Memorial Coliseum—also against the Giants. In this game, Gray became the first Dodger to hit a home run in the city of Los Angeles. In the bottom of the seventh inning, the Dodgers were on top 5–3. With one out, Gray performed his feat against the Giants' Johnny Antonelli to put the Dodgers ahead 6–3. "It was in the seventh inning and the count was 3–0 and he was just trying to throw a strike and I nailed it", he said. The Dodgers held on to win 6–5 their first game in their new home city.

"The Coliseum wasn’t a baseball field and a lot of guys just couldn’t get adjusted to that football field. Left field was only about 280 feet, but then you had an eighty foot fence and then in right center ... poor Duke Snider, he used to hit balls 450 feet and it was an out", Gray stated.

=== After the Dodgers ===
In 1958, Gray spent part of the season at Triple-A with the Montreal Royals. On June 15, 1959, after a slow start with Los Angeles, he was dealt to the St. Louis Cardinals in exchange for Chuck Essegian and Lloyd Merritt. He played in 36 games for the Redbirds, including six starts at shortstop, and raised his average to .233.

In 1960, Gray went hitless in eight early-season plate appearances with the Cardinals; then, on May 28, he was sent along with Vinegar Bend Mizell to the Pittsburgh Pirates in the same transaction that brought Ed Bauta and Julián Javier to St. Louis. Mizell won 13 games for Pittsburgh, helping them win the 1960 National League pennant en route to the world championship. Javier became a two-time NL All-Star in St. Louis. The Pirates immediately sent Gray to Triple-A, where he played the remainder of his pro career, retiring in 1962.

In a four-season career, Gray posted a slash line (BA/OBP/SLG) of .239/.321/.420 in 124 games overall, which included seven doubles, six triples, 12 home runs and four stolen bases, while driving in 41 runs and scoring 43 times. In his ten-year minor league career, he batted a combined .274 average with 96 home runs and 622 RBIs in 1,196 games.

Following his baseball career, Gray resided in Anaheim, California, with his wife Joanne and their three daughters: Catherine, Stacey and Nancy. He worked for the Buena Park School District maintenance department for a long time, retiring from there in 1993. In addition, he usually attended vintage baseball card shows and signed autographs. He was inducted into the Washington-Greene County Sports Hall of Fame in 2009.

Gray died in 2013 at home, just three days before his 82nd birthday.
