= Pennsylvania Route 221 =

State highway in Pennsylvania, United States

Pennsylvania Route 221

Route information
- Maintained by PennDOT
- Length: 31.0 mi (49.9 km)

Major junctions
- South end: PA 188 near Jefferson
- I-79 in Washington Township; US 19 in Washington Township; PA 18 in Morris Township; I-70 in Buffalo Township; US 40 in Buffalo Township
- North end: PA 231 in Acheson

Location
- Country: United States
- State: Pennsylvania
- Counties: Greene, Washington

Highway system
- Pennsylvania State Route System; Interstate; US; State; Scenic; Legislative
← US 220	→ US 222

Pennsylvania Route 221 (PA 221) is a 31-mile-long (50 km) state highway located in Greene and Washington counties in Pennsylvania. The southern terminus is at PA 188 near Jefferson. The northern terminus is at PA 231 in Acheson.

== Route description ==
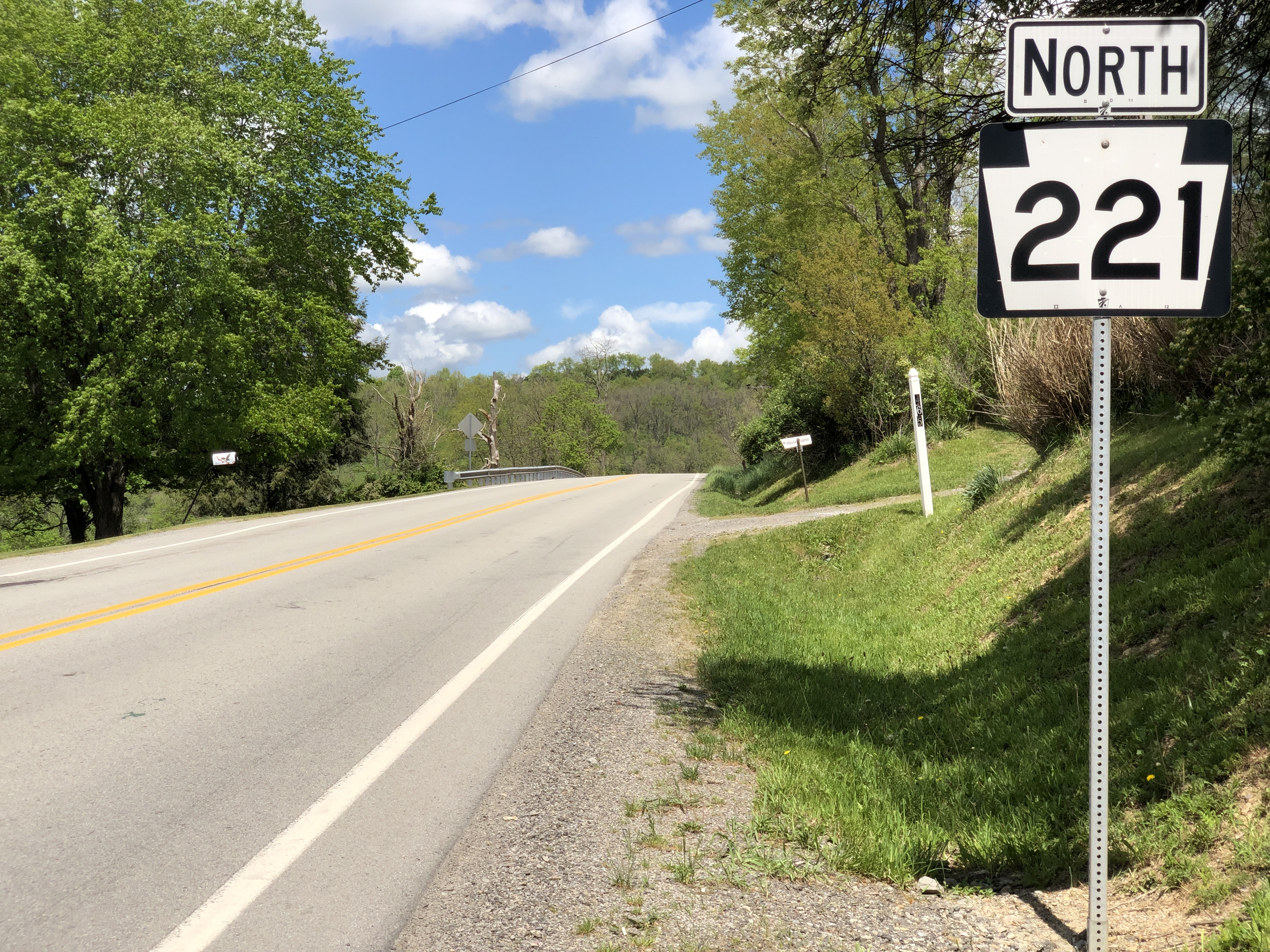
PA 221 northbound in Morgan Township

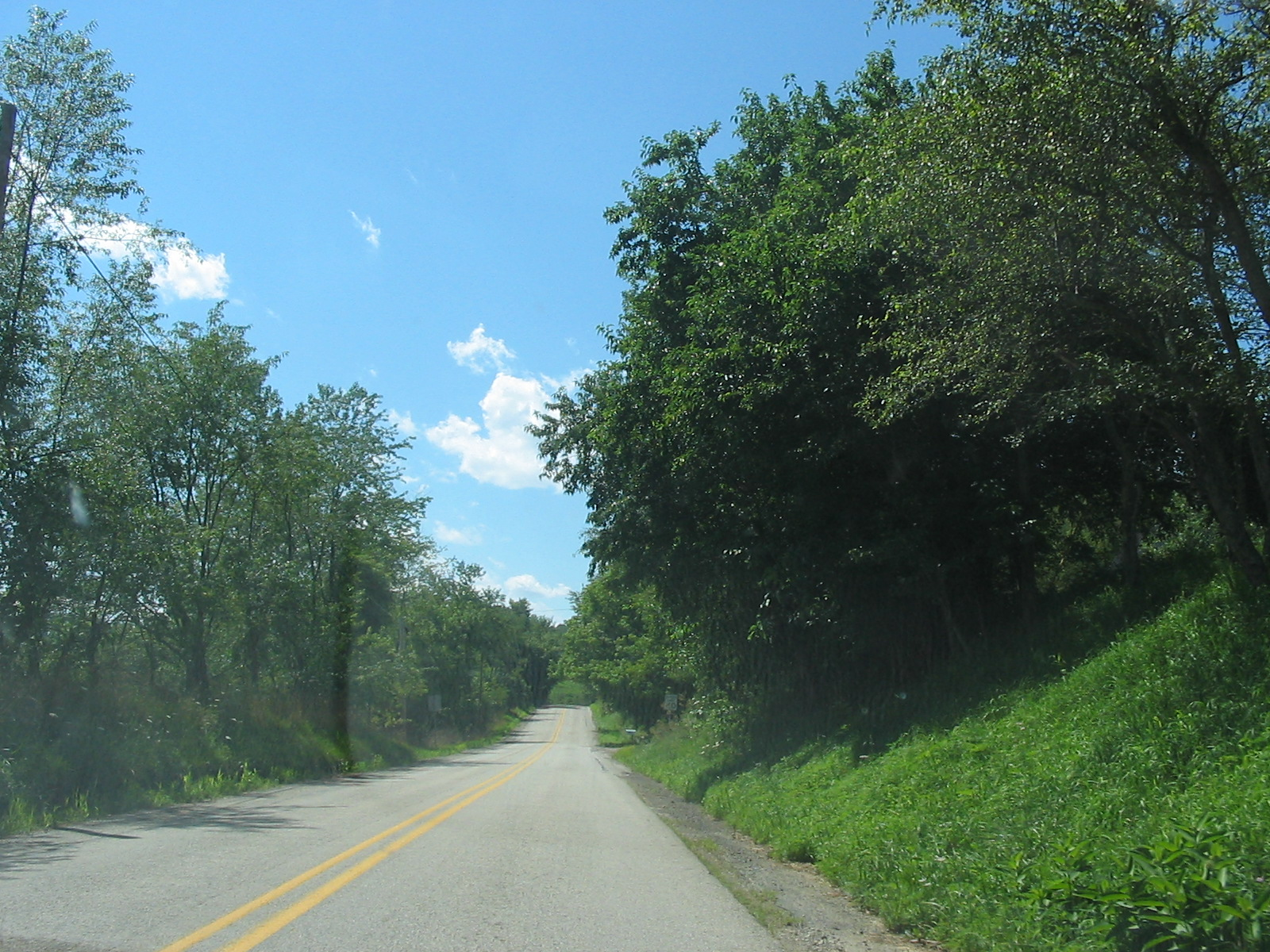
PA 221 as it passes through Washington Township

PA 221 begins at an intersection with PA 188 in Morgan Township, Greene County, heading northwest on two-lane undivided Lippencott Road. The road heads through a mix of farmland and woodland with some homes, running to the northeast of Ruff Creek and passing through Lippincott. The route winds through more rural areas, crossing into Washington Township and coming to a partial interchange with I-79, with ramps to and from the northbound lanes of I-79. A short distance later, PA 221 comes to an intersection with US 19 in Ruff Creek, which connects to ramps providing access to and from the southbound lanes of I-79. At this point, the road becomes Dunn Station Road and runs northwest through more areas of farms and woods with a few residences, turning to the north-northwest. The route continues through more rural areas, passing through Hope before briefly crossing into Morris Township.

PA 221 enters Morris Township in Washington County and becomes Conger Road, heading into wooded areas with a few fields. The route turns north and passes through Dunns Station and Plumbsock, turning west onto Plumsock Road. The route winds northwest through areas of farms and woods with some homes, coming to an intersection with PA 18. Here, PA 221 forms a concurrency with PA 18, heading northwest on Prosperity Pike. The road passes through woodland before heading past a few farms and running through the residential community of Prosperity. PA 221 splits from PA 18 by continuing northwest along S-Bridge Road, heading through agricultural areas with some woods and homes. The road turns north through more rural areas, curving northwest into South Franklin Township. The route curves back to the north and continues through more farmland and woodland with occasional residences. PA 221 enters Buffalo Township and comes to an interchange with I-70. Past this, the road runs northwest through wooded areas with some homes, reaching an intersection with US 40. The route becomes Green Valley Road and heads through farm fields with some woodland and residences. PA 221 turns north-northwest and crosses into Blaine Township, heading into residential areas as Constitution Boulevard and curving west into Taylorstown. Here, the route turns north onto Buffalo Creek Road and winds northwest through woods with some farms and homes. PA 221 continues northwest to its northern terminus at PA 231.

== Major intersections ==
County	Location	mi	km	Destinations	Notes
Greene	Morgan Township	0.0	0.0	PA 188 (Jefferson Road) – Waynesburg, Jefferson	Southern terminus of PA 221
Greene	Washington Township	4.6	7.4	I-79 north (Raymond P. Shafer Highway) – Washington	Exit 19 (I-79); I-79 northbound entrance/exit only
Greene	Washington Township	4.9	7.9	US 19 (Washington Road) to I-79 south – Waynesburg, Washington, Morgantown	
Washington	Morris Township	14.0	22.5	PA 18 south (Prosperity Pike) – Sparta	Southern terminus of PA 18 concurrency
Washington	Morris Township	15.1	24.3	PA 18 north (Prosperity Pike) – Lagonda	Northern terminus of PA 18 concurrency
Washington	Buffalo Township	21.9	35.2	I-70 – Washington, Wheeling	Exit 11 (I-70)
Washington	Buffalo Township	22.7	36.5	US 40 (Chestnut Street) – Washington, Claysville	
Washington	Blaine Township	31.0	49.9	PA 231 (North Road / Claysville Road)	Northern terminus of PA 221
1.000 mi = 1.609 km; 1.000 km = 0.621 mi: Concurrency terminus; Incomplete access

== PA 221 Truck ==
Pennsylvania Route 221 Truck
- Location: Washington County, Pennsylvania
- Existed: 2013–2014

Pennsylvania Route 221 Truck was a truck route bypassing a weight-restricted bridge over Buffalo Creek on PA 221 in Taylorstown, on which trucks over 36 tons and combination loads over 40 tons were strictly prohibited. The road was signed in 2013. The bridge was reconstructed in 2014, resulting in the deletion of the route.
