= Rice's Landing Historic District =

Historic district in Pennsylvania, United States

- U.S. National Register of Historic Places
- U.S. Historic district
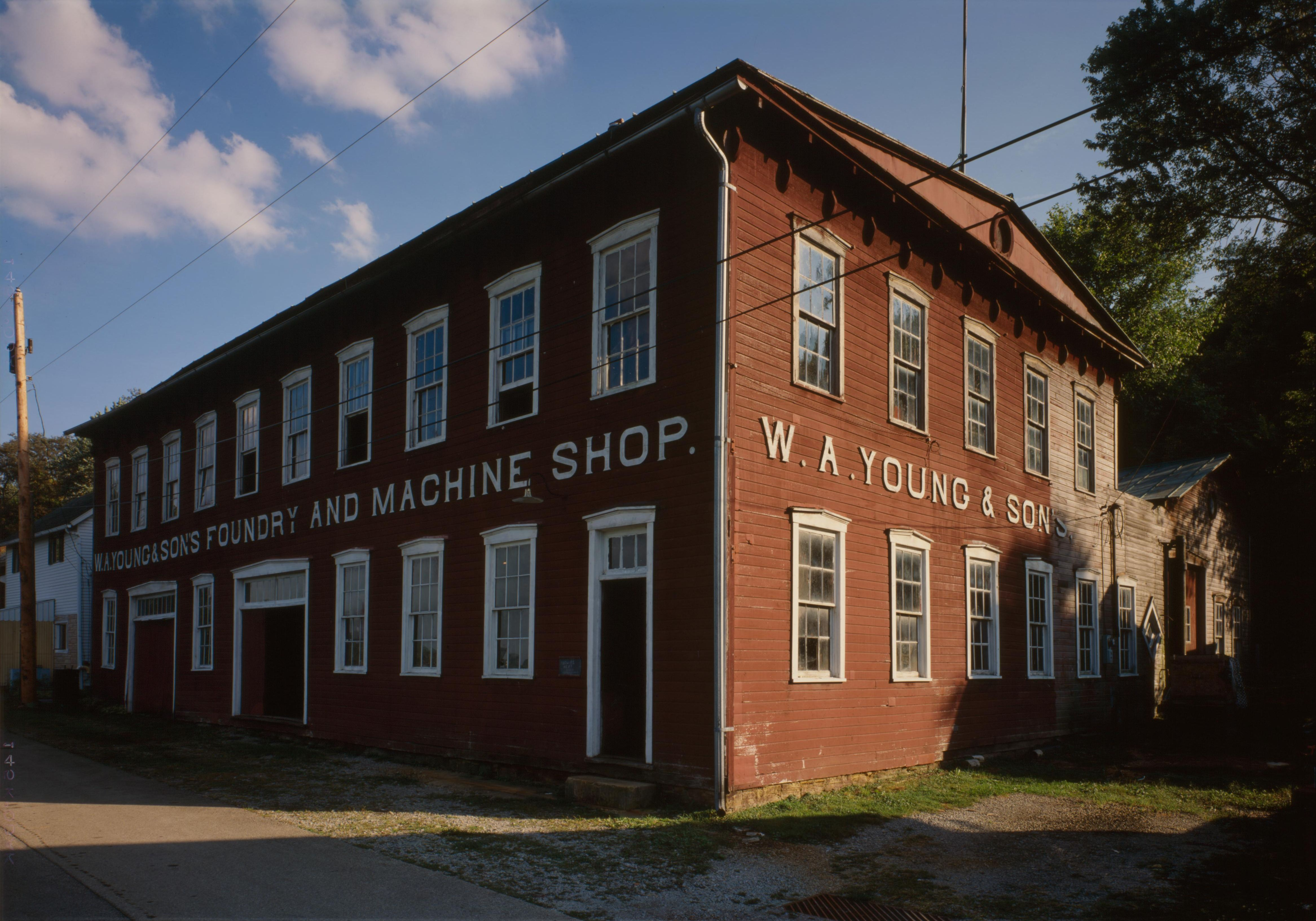
- W.A. Young & Sons Foundry & Machine Shop, 1991

- Location within Pennsylvania Location within the United States
- Location: Roughly bounded by the Monongahela R., Water, Second, Bayard, Carmichael, High, Main and Ferry including Pumpkin Run Pk., Rice's Landing, Pennsylvania
- Coordinates: 39°56′57″N 80°00′00″W
- Area: 81 acres (33 ha)
- Architectural style: Colonial Revival, Bungalow/craftsman, Vernacular Victorian
- NRHP reference No.: 92001723
- Added to NRHP: December 24, 1992

Rice's Landing Historic District is a national historic district that is located in Rice's Landing, Greene County, Pennsylvania.

It was added to the National Register of Historic Places in 1992.

== History and architectural features ==
This district includes sixty-three contributing buildings, four contributing sites, and five contributing structures that are located in the borough of Rice's Landing. It is dominated by one- to two-story examples of vernacular Victorian, Colonial Revival, and American Craftsman-style buildings.

Notable non-residential buildings include the Methodist Episcopal Church (1873), a brick jail (1850s), the W.A. Young & Sons Foundry & Machine Shop (a National Historic Landmark), the Excelsior Pottery building, Rice's Landing National Bank building, the Hughes store, and the Nash-Rambler Garage.

Contributing structures include the remains of Monongahela River Lock Number 6, a concrete bridge (1914), a railroad bridge (1913), a railroad tunnel (1913), and Dilworth Mine-related structures.
