= Jefferson-Morgan School District =

School district in Pennsylvania

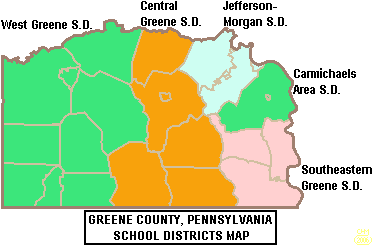
- Map of Greene County Pennsylvania School Districts

Address
- 1351 Jefferson Road Jefferson, Greene County, Pennsylvania, 15344-0158; United States

District information
- Type: Public
- Motto: Rocket Pride
- Grades: K-12
- Superintendent: Mr. Brandon Robinson
- Business administrator: Jennifer Foringer
- School board: Jefferson-Morgan School Board
- Chair of the board: Jason Beal
- Schools: Two

Students and staff
- Students: 825 (2012)
- Teachers: 51 (2022)
- Staff: 82 (2022)
- Student–teacher ratio: 13:1
- District mascot: Rocket
- Colors: Orange and black

Other information
- Website: www.jmsd.org

Jefferson-Morgan School District is a small, rural, public school district located in Greene County, Pennsylvania. It serves the boroughs of Jefferson, Rices Landing, and Clarksville. It also serves Jefferson and Morgan townships. Jefferson-Morgan School District encompasses approximately 47 square miles (120 km^{2}). According to 2000 federal census data, it served a resident population of 6,142. By 2010, the District's population declined to 5,895 people. in 2010, the educational attainment levels for the population 25 and over were 87.0% high school graduates and 13.7% college graduates. In 2009, the District residents’ per capita income was $16,304, while the median family income was $38,728. In the Commonwealth, the median family income was $49,501 and the United States median family income was $49,445, in 2010. The school district reports 825 students in 2012. Whites make up 97% of the student body, blacks make up nearly 2%. The teacher-student ratio is 13:1. Thirty-seven percent of the students qualify for free or reduced-price lunch prices. "J-M" is also known for their many wins and losses against the Carmichaels Area School District.

Jefferson-Morgan School District operates two schools: Jefferson-Morgan Elementary School and Jefferson-Morgan Middle/Senior High School. The district is often referred to locally as "J-M" or "Jeff-Morgan." Jefferson-Morgan High school students may choose to attend Greene County Career and Technology Center for training in the construction and mechanical trades. The Intermediate Unit IU1 provides the District with a wide variety of services like specialized education for disabled students and hearing, speech and visual disability services and professional development for staff and faculty.

== Extracurriculars ==
Jefferson-Morgan School District offers a variety of clubs, activities and an extensive sports program. Eligibility.

=== Sports ===
The District funds:

Boys

- Baseball - A
- Basketball - AA
- Football - A
- Golf - AA
- Wrestling - AA

Girls

- Basketball - AA
- Softball - A
- Volleyball - A

Middle School Sports

Boys

- Basketball
- Football
- Wrestling

Girls

- Basketball
- Softball
- Volleyball

According to PIAA directory 2019
