= W. A. Young and Sons Foundry and Machine Shop =

- U.S. National Register of Historic Places
- U.S. National Historic Landmark
- U.S. Historic district – Contributing property
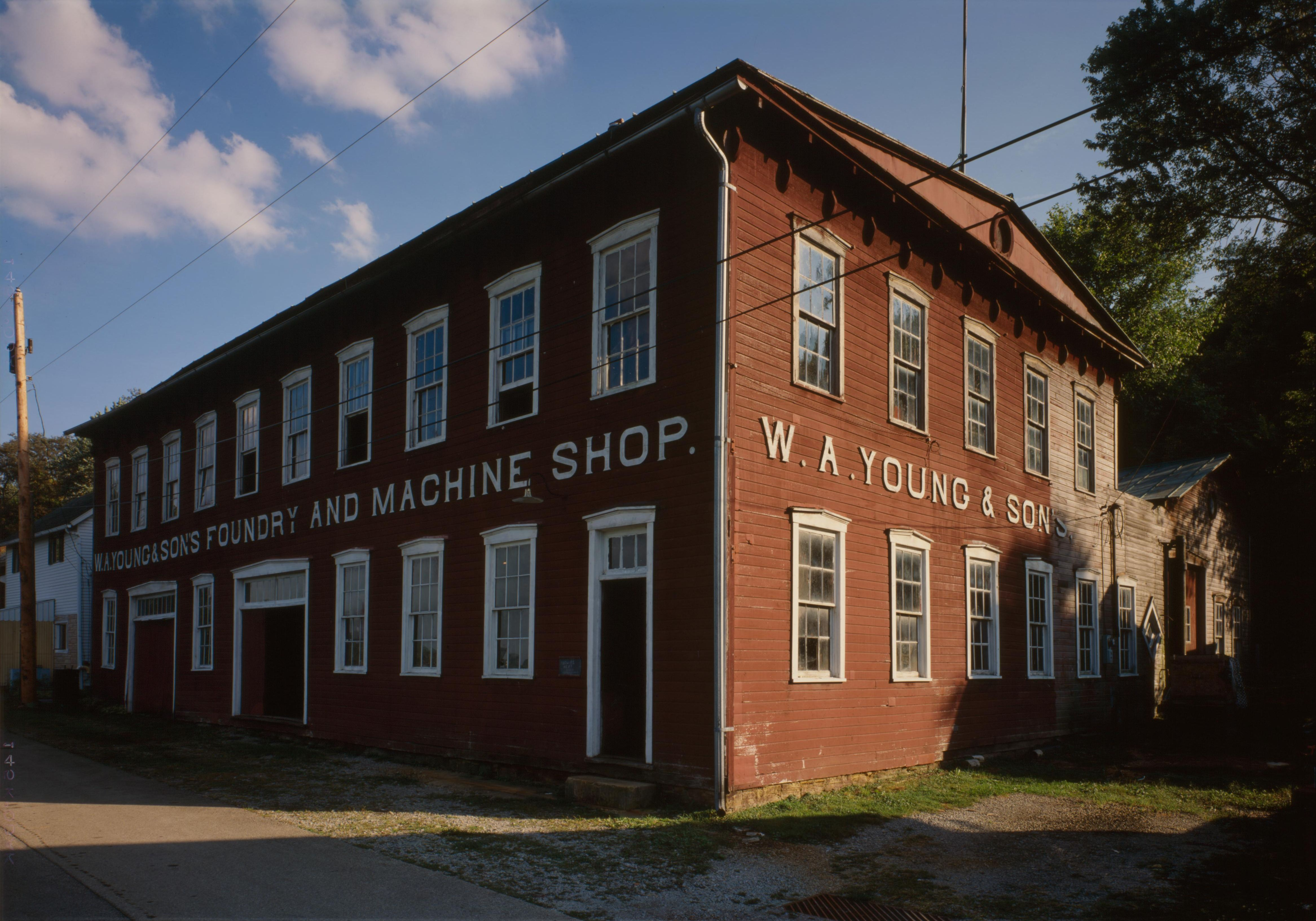

- Location within Pennsylvania Location within the United States
- Location: 116 Water St., Rices Landing, Pennsylvania
- Coordinates: 39°56′57″N 79°59′54.7″W
- Built: 1900
- Part of: Rice's Landing Historic District (ID92001723)
- NRHP reference No.: 100000839

Significant dates
- Added to NRHP: December 23, 2016
- Designated NHL: December 23, 2016
- Designated CP: December 24, 1992

The W. A. Young and Sons Foundry and Machine Shop is a historic industrial facility at 116 Water Street in Rices Landing, Pennsylvania. Founded in 1900 and operating until 1965, it is one of the best-preserved examples of an early 20th-century small industrial machine shop in the nation. It was designated a National Historic Landmark in 2016.

== Description and history ==
The Young Foundry and Machine Shop is located in the village of Rices Landing, on the south side of the Monongahela River in rural southwestern Pennsylvania. It is set on the south side of Water Street, which separates most of the property from the river. The shop is a complex of three interconnected wood-frame structures, which are basically utilitarian and vernacular in appearance, with a gabled roof and clapboarded exterior. The Front Shop, the largest building, houses the main machine shop on the ground floor and the Pattern Shop on the second floor. Attached to the rear of this building are two smaller ones, housing the Foundry and the "Back Shop". Tools and equipment are arranged by function, in order to maximize flexibility.

In the late 19th century, Rice's Landing was a prosperous shipment point for the region. In 1900 William A. Young built the foundry and machine shop purchased that year. He established a small foundry and metal machine shop on the premises. The foundry operated until the 1930s, when Young closed it, unable to compete with larger and more efficient operations. The shop remained in operation until 1965, operated after Young's death in 1940 by his two sons. The building and its entire suite of tools, patterns, and records, was acquired by the Greene County Historical Society in 1985. It sold the property in 2009 to the Steel Industry Heritage Corporation, which has undertaken preservation of the site.

== See also ==
- List of National Historic Landmarks in Pennsylvania
- National Register of Historic Places listings in Greene County, Pennsylvania
