= Ruff Creek (South Fork Tenmile Creek tributary) =

River in Pennsylvania

Ruff Creek Tributary to South Fork Tenmile Creek
- Location of Ruff Creek mouth Ruff Creek (South Fork Tenmile Creek tributary) (the United States)

Location
- Country: United States of America
- State: Pennsylvania
- County: Greene
- Townships: Morgan; Washington

Physical characteristics
- Source: divide between Ruff Creek and Tenmile Creek
  - location: about 1 mile southeast of Dunn's Station, Pennsylvania
  - coordinates: 40°00′31″N 080°14′26″W
  - elevation: 1,230 ft (370 m)
- Mouth: South Fork Tenmile Creek
  - location: about 3 miles northeast of Morrisville, Pennsylvania
  - coordinates: 39°54′57″N 080°06′19″W
  - elevation: 879 ft (268 m)
- Length: 13.2 mi (21.2 km)
- Basin size: 26.16 square miles (67.8 km^{2})
- Discharge
  - average: 31.85 cu ft/s (0.902 m^{3}/s) at mouth with South Fork Tenmile Creek

Basin features
- Progression: southeast
- River system: Monongahela River
- Tributaries
  - left: Craynes Run; Poverty Run; Grimes Run
  - right: Walkers Run; Jersey Run

Ruff Creek is a large tributary to South Fork Tenmile Creek in southwestern Pennsylvania. The stream rises in north-central Greene County and flows southeast entering South Fork Tenmile Creek northeast of Morrisville, Pennsylvania. The watershed is roughly 27% agricultural, 64% forested and the rest is other uses.
