= Jefferson Township, Pennsylvania =

Jefferson Township is the name of some places in the U.S. state of Pennsylvania:

- Jefferson Township, Berks County, Pennsylvania
- Jefferson Township, Butler County, Pennsylvania
- Jefferson Township, Dauphin County, Pennsylvania
- Jefferson Township, Fayette County, Pennsylvania
- Jefferson Township, Greene County, Pennsylvania
- Jefferson Township, Lackawanna County, Pennsylvania
- Jefferson Township, Mercer County, Pennsylvania
- Jefferson Township, Somerset County, Pennsylvania
- Jefferson Township, Washington County, Pennsylvania
