= Dunns Station, Pennsylvania =

Coordinates: 40.016°N 80.250°W

Dunns Station is an unincorporated, rural village located in the southern part of Morris Township, Washington County, Pennsylvania. It is located near the intersection of Dunns Station Road (State Route 221) and Conger Road.

The community came into being with the opening of the Waynesburg and Washington Railroad in 1877. Stations were located and often named for the major property owner who sold the right-of-way to the railroad company. In this immediate area, Daniel Dunn (1830–1886) owned approximately 340 acres at that time.

At its peak in the 1920-1930s, there were about a dozen residences in the general locality and a one-room school. The single commercial building containing a general store and post office made up the station. A small warehouse, initially used as a milk shed, was adjacent, as well as a privy. A baseball field by the railroad station provided the venue for community teams during the 1920s through the 1940s, constituting a source of local pride and summer excitement.

As of 2013 the station, warehouse, railroad, and some of the residential units in the vicinity no longer existed. The use of the schoolhouse was discontinued in the late 1940s. A 1979 painting by artist Malcolm Parcell entitled “W and W Railroad – Dunns Station” depicts an early 20th Century view of the locality.
