= Coal Lick Run (South Fork Tenmile Creek tributary) =

River in Pennsylvania

Coal Lick Run Tributary to South Fork Tenmile Creek
- Location of Coal Lick Run mouth Coal Lick Run (South Fork Tenmile Creek tributary) (the United States)

Location
- Country: United States of America
- State: Pennsylvania
- County: Greene
- Township: Franklin

Physical characteristics
- Source: divide between Coal Lick Run and Whiteley Creek (Dutch Run)
  - location: about 3 miles southeast of Morrisville, Pennsylvania
  - coordinates: 39°52′27″N 080°06′33″W
  - elevation: 1,140 ft (350 m)
- Mouth: South Fork Tenmile Creek
  - location: about 2 miles east of Morrisville, Pennsylvania
  - coordinates: 39°54′17″N 080°07′07″W
  - elevation: 895 ft (273 m)
- Length: 2.51 mi (4.04 km)
- Basin size: 3.63 square miles (9.4 km^{2})
- Discharge
  - average: 4.57 cu ft/s (0.129 m^{3}/s) at mouth with South Fork Tenmile Creek

Basin features
- Progression: north
- River system: Monongahela River
- Tributaries
  - left: unnamed tributaries
  - right: unnamed tributaries

Coal Lick Run is a small tributary to South Fork Tenmile Creek in southwestern Pennsylvania. The stream rises in northeastern Greene and flows north entering South Fork Tenmile Creek east of Morrisville, Pennsylvania near the Greene County Airport. The watershed is roughly 30% agricultural, 53% forested and the rest is other uses.
