= West Waynesburg, Pennsylvania =

Unincorporated community in Pennsylvania, US

- Census-designated place
- Location within Pennsylvania Location within the United States
- Coordinates: 39°54′00″N 80°12′03″W
- Country: United States
- State: Pennsylvania
- County: Greene

Area
  - Total: 0.22 sq mi (0.56 km^{2})
  - Land: 0.22 sq mi (0.56 km^{2})
  - Water: 0 sq mi (0.0 km^{2})
- Elevation: 978 ft (298 m)

Population (2010)
  - Total: 446
  - Density: 2,067/sq mi (797.9/km^{2})
- Time zone: UTC-5 (Eastern (EST))
  - Summer (DST): UTC-4 (EDT)
- FIPS code: 42-84176
- GNIS feature ID: 2630048

West Waynesburg is a census-designated place in Franklin Township, Greene County, Pennsylvania, United States. It is located next to the western border of Waynesburg, the Greene County seat, within a mile of downtown, along Pennsylvania Routes 18 and 21. As of the 2010 census, the population of West Waynesburg was 446.

West Waynesburg is sometimes referred to as “Bucktown”. This derives from the former owners of part of the land that West Waynesburg is today, the Buchanan’s, whom “Buchanan Avenue” is named for. The eastern side of West Waynesburg was owned by the Ely’s, whom “Ely Avenue” is named for.

== Demographics ==
Historical population
| Census | Pop. | Note | %± |
|---|---|---|---|
| 2010 | 446 | | — |
| 2020 | 401 | | −10.1% |
