= Rices Landing, Pennsylvania =

Borough in Pennsylvania, US

- Borough
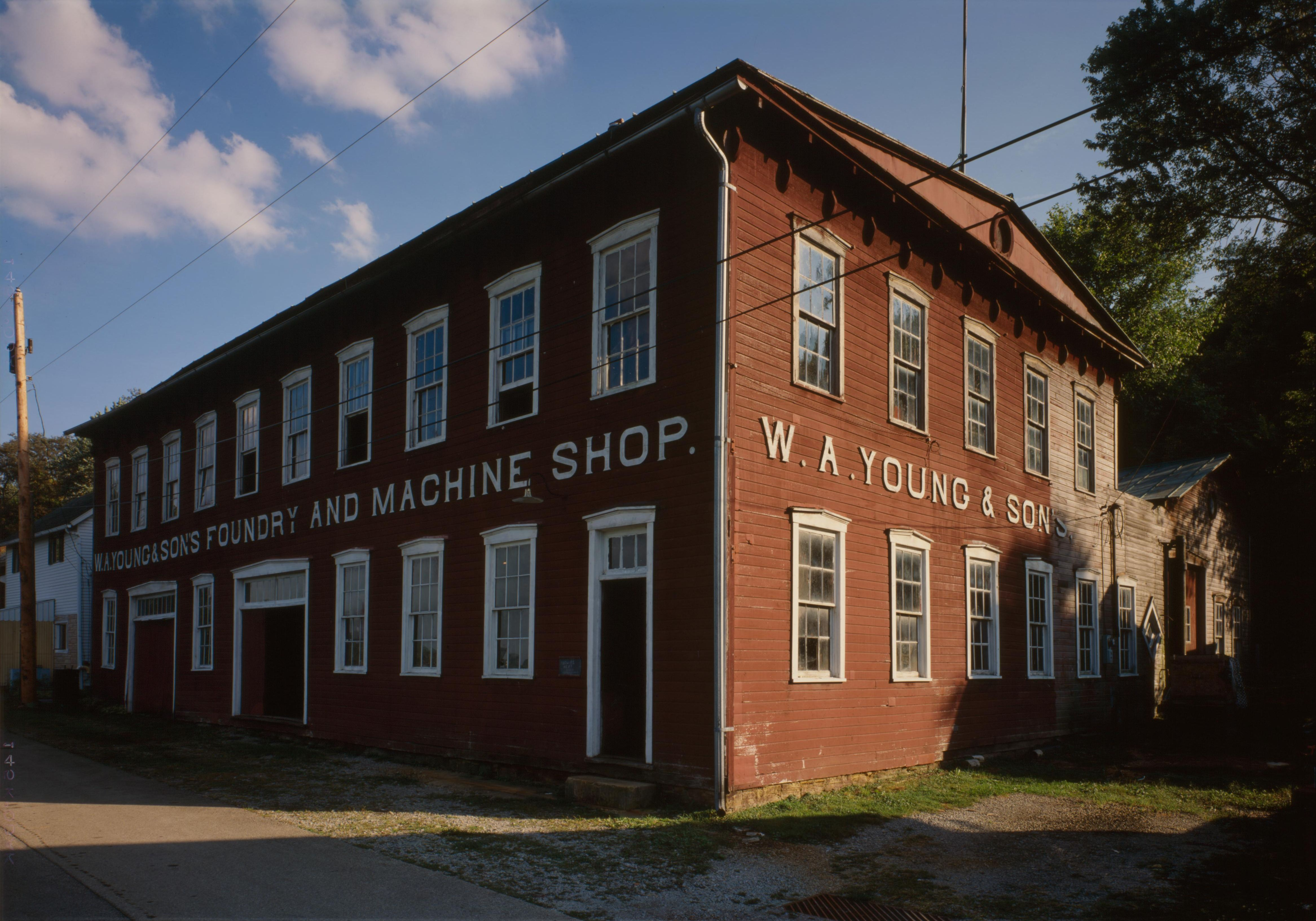
- Former foundry in Rices Landing

- Location of Rices Landing in Greene County, Pennsylvania (left) and of Greene County in Pennsylvania (right)

- Location within Pennsylvania Location within the United States
- Coordinates: 39°56′47″N 79°59′36″W
- Country: United States
- State: Pennsylvania
- County: Greene
- Established: 1903

Government
  - Body: Rices Landing Borough Council
  - Mayor: Scott A. Durr (Democrat)
  - Borough Tax Collector: Kimberly Kim Provance (Republican)

Area
  - Total: 0.91 sq mi (2.36 km^{2})
  - Land: 0.80 sq mi (2.06 km^{2})
  - Water: 0.12 sq mi (0.30 km^{2})
- Elevation: 971 ft (296 m)

Population (2020)
  - Total: 420 ▼
  - Estimate (2023): 400
  - Density: 533.8/sq mi (206.11/km^{2})
- Time zone: UTC-4 (EST)
  - Summer (DST): UTC-5 (EDT)
- ZIP Code: 15357
- Area code: 724
- FIPS code: 42-059-64432

Rices Landing is a borough in Greene County, Pennsylvania, United States. The population was 420 at the 2020 census.

== Geography ==
Rices Landing is located in northeastern Greene County at 39°56′47″N 79°59′36″W (39.946282, -79.993295), on the south (west) bank of the Monongahela River at the mouth of Pumpkin Run. It is bordered to the southeast by Cumberland Township, to the southwest and west by Jefferson Township, and to the north, across the Monongahela, by Luzerne Township in Fayette County. The closest road crossings of the Monongahela are the Mon–Fayette Expressway Bridge (Pennsylvania Route 43) 11 miles (18 km) by road to the north, and the Masontown Bridge (Pennsylvania Route 21) 9 miles (14 km) to the south.

According to the United States Census Bureau, the borough of Rices Landing has a total area of 0.93 square miles (2.4 km^{2}), of which 0.81 square miles (2.1 km^{2}) is land and 0.1 square miles (0.3 km^{2}), or 12.86%, is water.

== Demographics ==
Historical population
Census	Pop.	Note	%±
1880	116		—
1910	671		—
1920	883		31.6%
1930	977		10.6%
1940	962		−1.5%
1950	796		−17.3%
1960	693		−12.9%
1970	473		−31.7%
1980	516		9.1%
1990	457		−11.4%
2000	443		−3.1%
2010	463		4.5%
2020	425		−8.2%
2025 (est.)	392	▼	−7.8%

As of the census of 2010, there were 463 people, 179 households, and 126 families residing in the borough. The population density was 574.8 inhabitants per square mile (221.9/km^{2}). There were 190 housing units at an average density of 246.5 per square mile (95.2/km^{2}). The racial makeup of the borough was 98.42% White, 0.68% African American, and 0.90% from two or more races.

There were 179 households, out of which 27.9% had children under the age of 18 living with them, 59.8% were married couples living together, 8.4% had a female householder with no husband present, and 29.1% were non-families. 27.9% of all households were made up of individuals, and 14.5% had someone living alone who was 65 years of age or older. The average household size was 2.47 and the average family size was 3.04.

In the borough the population was spread out, with 24.6% under the age of 18, 4.5% from 18 to 24, 27.8% from 25 to 44, 25.7% from 45 to 64, and 17.4% who were 65 years of age or older. The median age was 39 years. For every 100 females, there were 97.8 males. For every 100 females age 18 and over, there were 90.9 males.

The median income for a household in the borough was $34,306, and the median income for a family was $39,792. Males had a median income of $28,646 versus $20,000 for females. The per capita income for the borough was $17,775. About 5.7% of families and 8.0% of the population were below the poverty line, including 9.5% of those under age 18 and 3.2% of those age 65 or over.

== History ==
Rices Landing is a small rural town located along the western bank of the Monongahela River, approximately 50 miles (80 km) south of Pittsburgh. One of the first visitors to the area was George Washington. Tale has it that in 1755, while he was traveling to Fort Duquesne, he and his men camped in this area, just across from Pumpkin Run on the other side of the river after he crossed.

In 1786, John Rice purchased land on the east side of Enoch's Run, and at about the same time, Abijah McClain purchased land on the west side. John Rice named the community he built "Rices Landing", while Abijah McClain called his settlement "Newport". In 1801, Benjamin Franklin mapped out the area and combined the two communities under the name "Rices Landing". Enoch's Run was renamed "Swan Run" before it eventually took the name it holds today, Pumpkin Run.

Rices Landing officially incorporated in April 1903. The availability of valuable resources such as trees, clay, sand, coal and transportation allowed the community to thrive. Shops, trading posts, taverns, and other businesses once lined its busy streets. It was so prosperous that it was regarded as the "Gateway to Western Pennsylvania" by frontier settlers.

Rices Landing is the former home of US Olympic wrestler and four-time state champion Cary Kolat. Kolat attended Jefferson-Morgan High School. He is known as being one of the best wrestlers in history, going 137–0 in high school and 111–7 in college. Kolat won many international medals and competed in the 2000 Sydney Olympics.

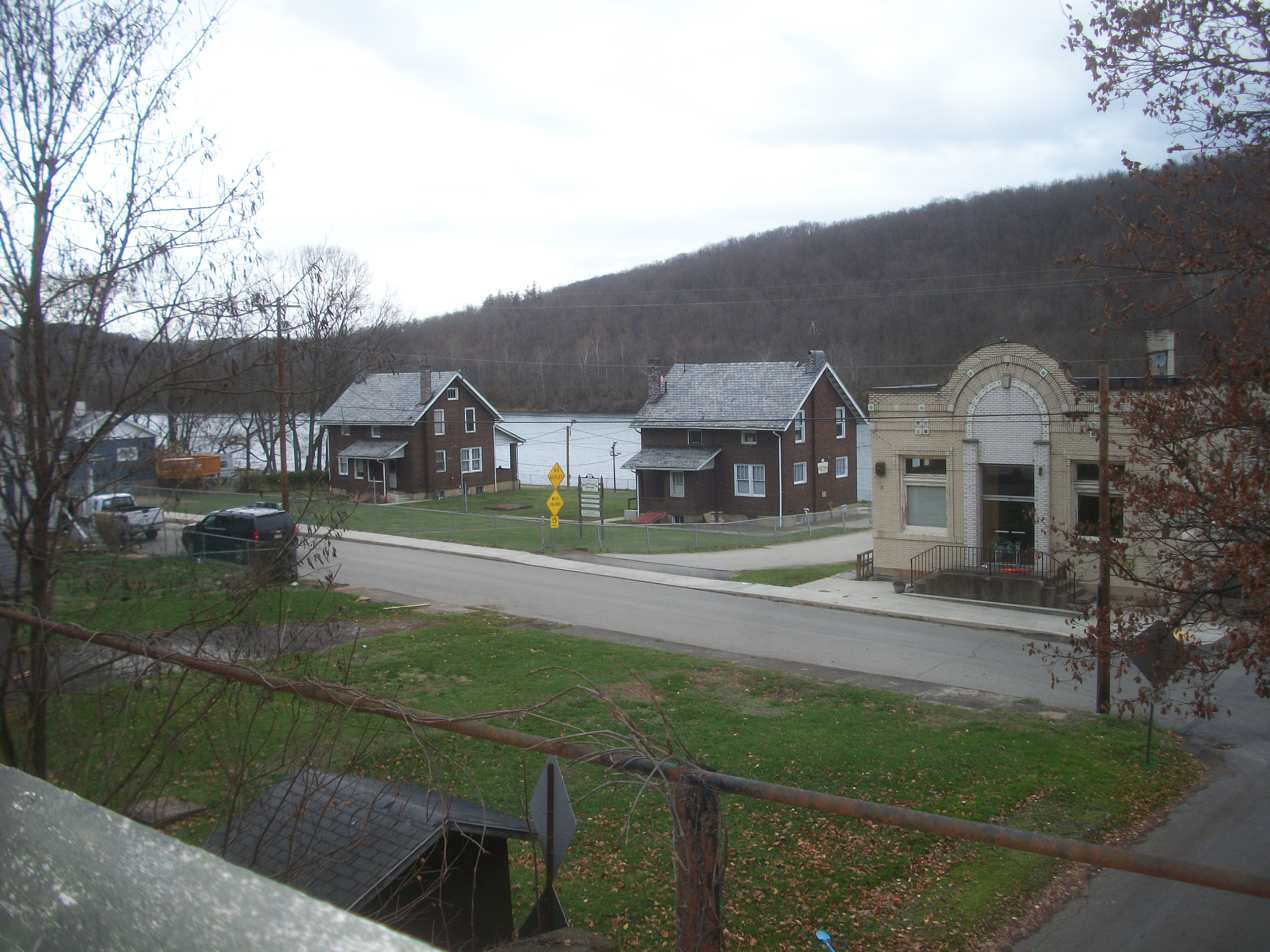
View from the Greene River Trail. The National Bank building has since been demolished.

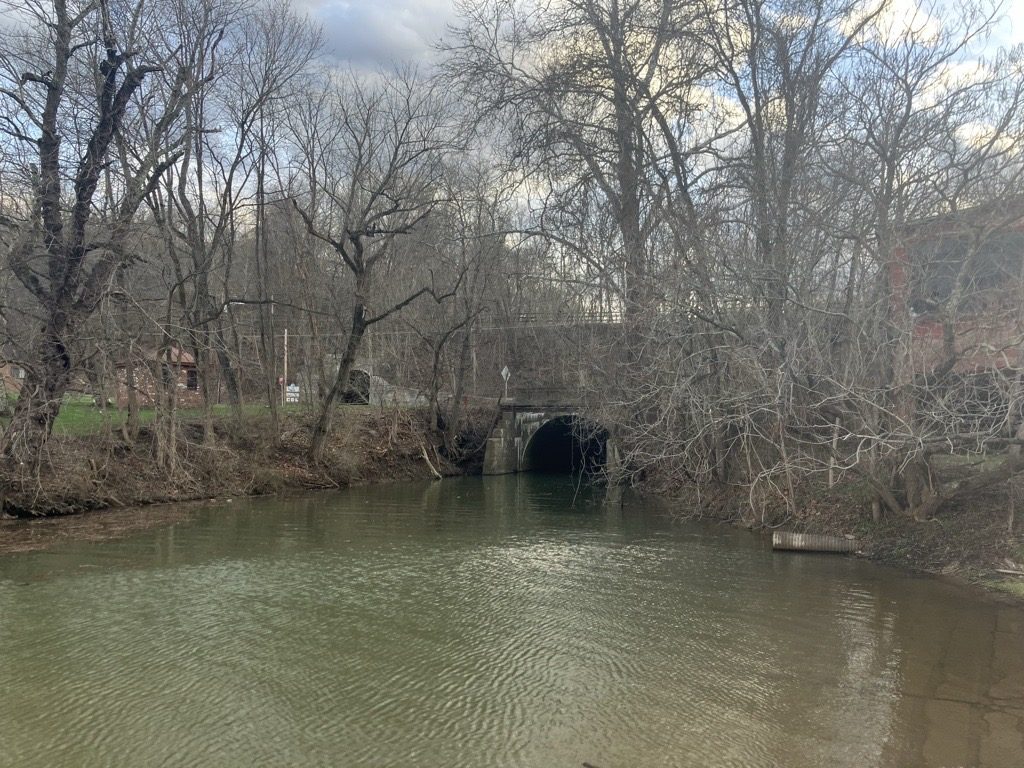
Confluence of Pumpkin Run with the Monongahela River in Rices Landing

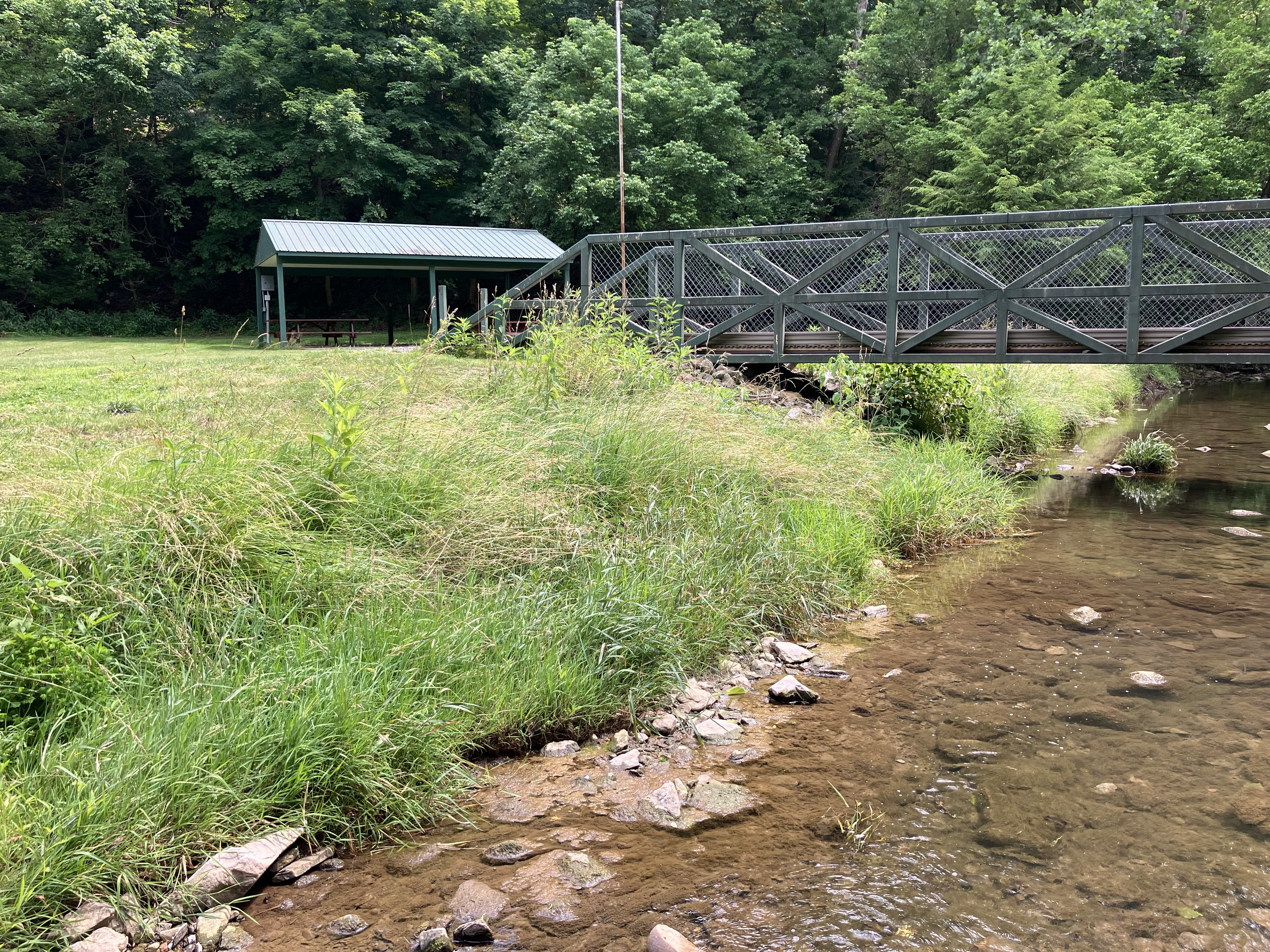
Pumpkin Run Park

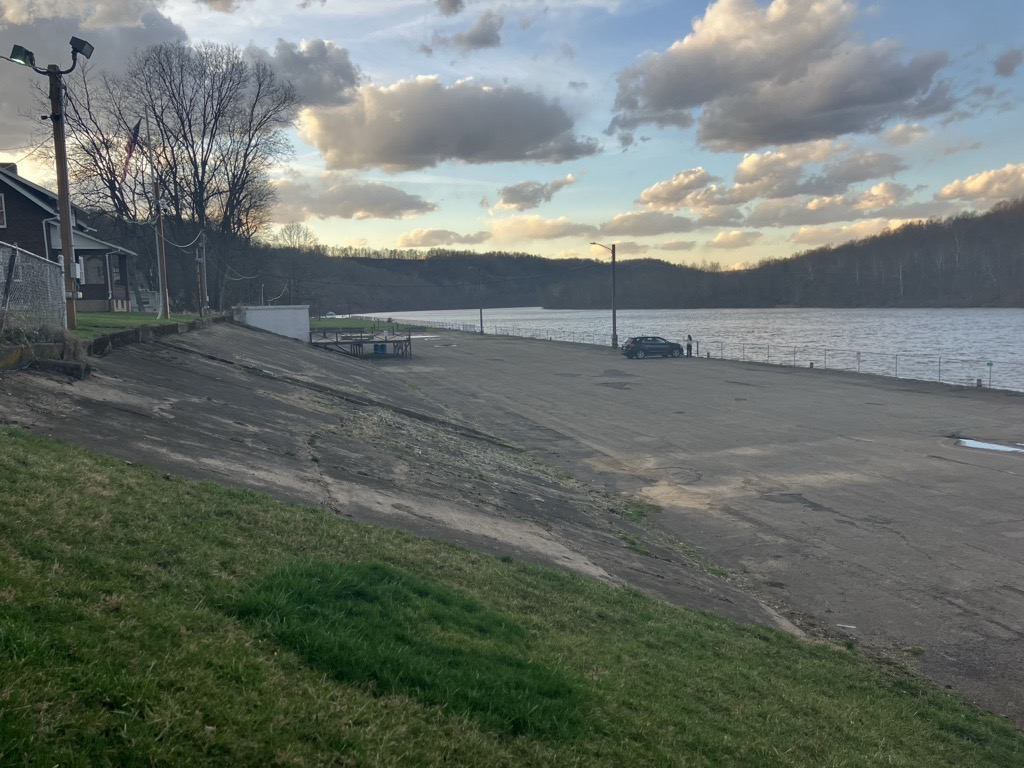
Remnants of Lock No. 6. Commonly known as the lock wall, the annual Riverfest is held here.

Established in 1903, Rices Landing is a town rich in tradition. The center of industry in Rices Landing during the First and Second World Wars was the W. A. Young and Sons Foundry and Machine Shop, which is still in existence. The foundry was used to make many different items for the war effort and will undergo construction in the coming year. The town was in the heart of the steel industry, with many coal mines located in and around the town. Many of these mines and industry are no longer around. Rices Landing is home to Pumpkin Run Park, which is owned and maintained by the borough. The park opens on Memorial Day and closes on Labor Day. Located in the downtown area is the Greene River Bike and Walking Trail, which is a continuing project that reaches from Fredericktown to Crucible.

The Rice's Landing Historic District was added to the National Register of Historic Places in 1992.

== Government ==
Rices Landing's local government is made up of five council members and the mayor of the town. Council members Mark L. Teegarden, Sr. (President), William M. Kozich, and Brennan Kozich.

== Education ==
Some of Rices Landing is a part of the Jefferson-Morgan School District, which is located on 1334 Jefferson Road in Jefferson. The small, rural school offers one-on-one experience between students and teachers. Jefferson-Morgan consists of two schools: an elementary school ranging from grades K-6, and a middle and high school combined. The school colors are orange and black. In 2005, Jefferson-Morgan launched the campaign, "Classrooms for the future," which focuses on bringing technology to the classroom. The campaign allows teachers to use technology as a teaching tool to better prepare students for the real world.

The other part of Rice's Landing is part of the Carmichaels Area School District.
