= Morrisville, Greene County, Pennsylvania =

Unincorporated community in Pennsylvania, US

- Census-designated place
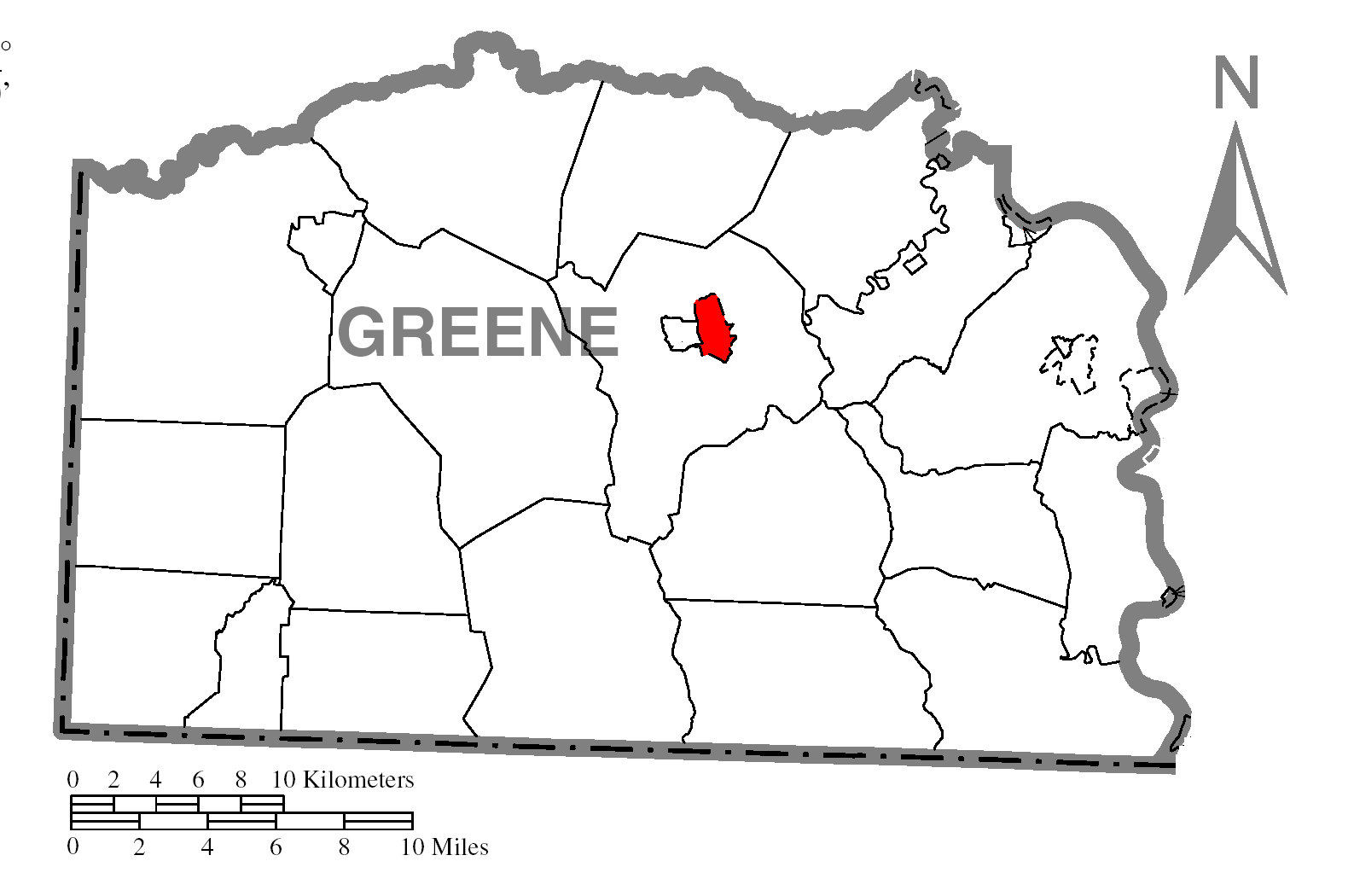
- Location of Morrisville in Greene County
- Coordinates: 39°53′54″N 80°10′5″W
- Country: United States
- State: Pennsylvania
- County: Greene
- Township: Franklin

Area
  - Total: 1.54 sq mi (3.99 km^{2})
  - Land: 1.54 sq mi (3.99 km^{2})
  - Water: 0 sq mi (0.00 km^{2})

Population (2020)
  - Total: 1,209
  - Density: 784.9/sq mi (303.07/km^{2})
- Time zone: UTC-4 (EST)
  - Summer (DST): UTC-5 (EDT)
- Area code: 724
- FIPS code: 42-51152

Morrisville is a census-designated place (CDP) in Franklin Township, Greene County, Pennsylvania, United States. The population was 1,265 at the 2010 census.

== Geography ==
Morrisville is located at 39°53′54″N 80°10′5″W (39.898416, -80.168063).

According to the United States Census Bureau, the CDP has a total area of 1.5 square miles (4.0 km^{2}), all land.

== Demographics ==
Historical population
Census	Pop.	Note	%±
2000	1,443		—
2010	1,265		−12.3%
2020	1,209		−4.4%
U.S. Decennial Census

As of the census of 2000, there were 1,443 people, 649 households, and 391 families residing in the CDP. The population density was 947.7 inhabitants per square mile (365.9/km^{2}). There were 680 housing units at an average density of 446.6 per square mile (172.4/km^{2}). The racial makeup of the CDP was 97.78% White, 0.55% African American, 0.07% Native American, 1.46% Asian, 0.07% Pacific Islander, and 0.07% from two or more races. Hispanic or Latino of any race were 0.42% of the population.

There were 649 households, out of which 23.6% had children under the age of 18 living with them, 48.1% were married couples living together, 10.2% had a female householder with no husband present, and 39.6% were non-families. 36.8% of all households were made up of individuals, and 21.1% had someone living alone who was 65 years of age or older. The average household size was 2.19 and the average family size was 2.83.

In the CDP, the population was spread out, with 20.0% under the age of 18, 6.5% from 18 to 24, 24.6% from 25 to 44, 25.6% from 45 to 64, and 23.4% who were 65 years of age or older. The median age was 44 years. For every 100 females, there were 81.1 males. For every 100 females age 18 and over, there were 76.6 males.

The median income for a household in the CDP was $22,880, and the median income for a family was $36,333. Males had a median income of $34,688 versus $27,969 for females. The per capita income for the CDP was $16,380. About 15.0% of families and 16.8% of the population were below the poverty line, including 29.7% of those under age 18 and 10.3% of those age 65 or over.
