= Dry Tavern, Pennsylvania =

Unincorporated community in Pennsylvania, US

- Census-designated place
- Location within Pennsylvania Location within the United States
- Coordinates: 39°56′24″N 80°00′34″W
- Country: United States
- State: Pennsylvania
- County: Greene
- Township: Jefferson

Area
  - Total: 1.35 sq mi (3.50 km^{2})
  - Land: 1.35 sq mi (3.50 km^{2})
  - Water: 0 sq mi (0.00 km^{2})
- Elevation: 1,033 ft (315 m)

Population (2020)
  - Total: 655
  - Density: 484.6/sq mi (187.09/km^{2})
- Time zone: UTC-5 (Eastern (EST))
  - Summer (DST): UTC-4 (EDT)
- FIPS code: 42-20080
- GNIS feature ID: 2634213

Dry Tavern is a census-designated place in Jefferson Township, Greene County, Pennsylvania, United States. It is located next to the borough of Rices Landing along Pennsylvania Route 88, on high ground south of the Monongahela River. As of the 2010 census the population was 697.

== Etymology ==
Dry Tavern took its name from a local tavern which sold no alcohol.

== Demographics ==
Historical population
Census	Pop.	Note	%±
2010	697		—
2020	655		−6.0%
U.S. Decennial Census
