= Jefferson Township, Greene County, Pennsylvania =

Township in Pennsylvania, US

Coordinates: 39°52′29″N 80°05′29″W

- Township
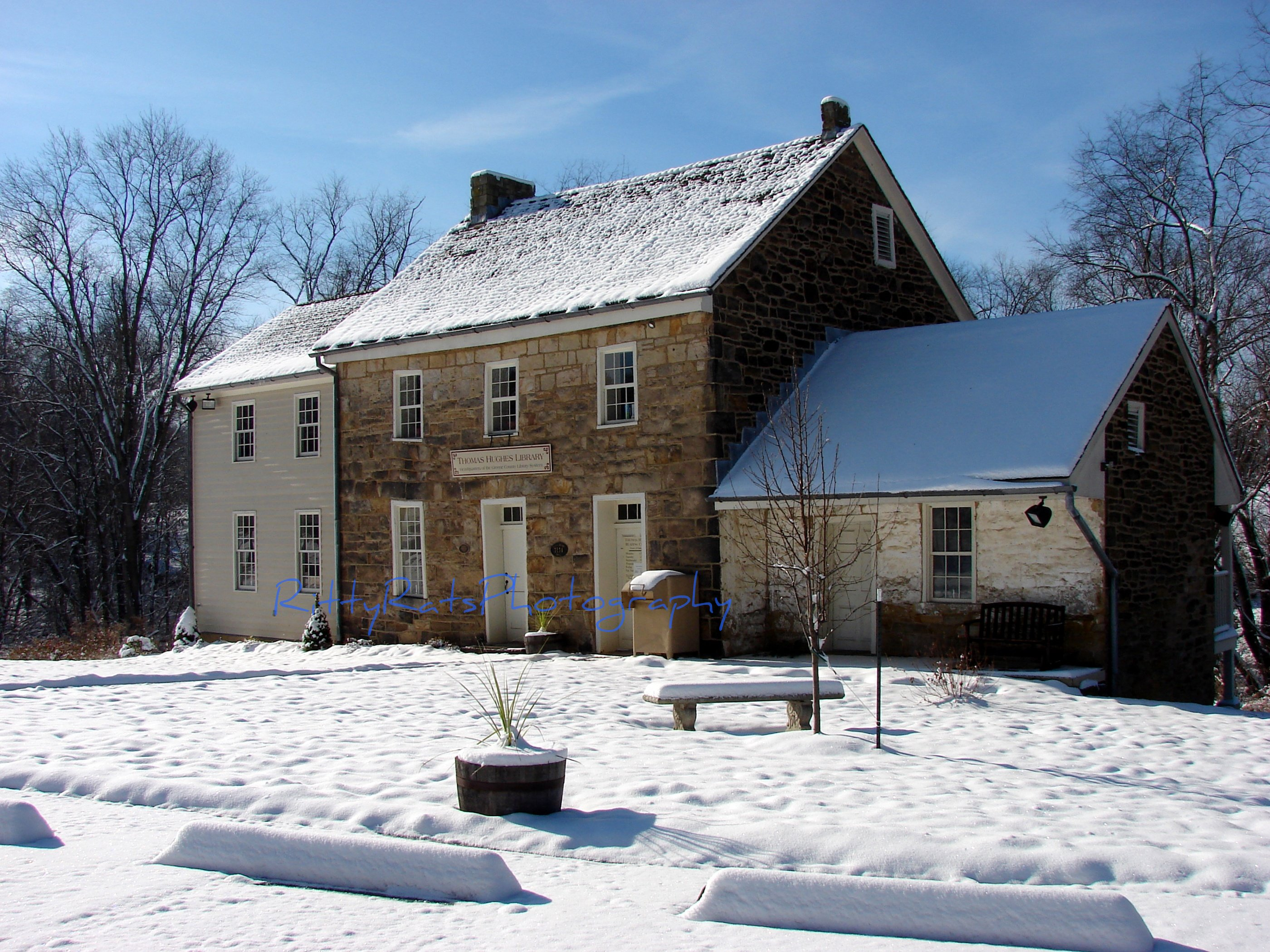
- Hughes House (1814); National Register of Historic Places

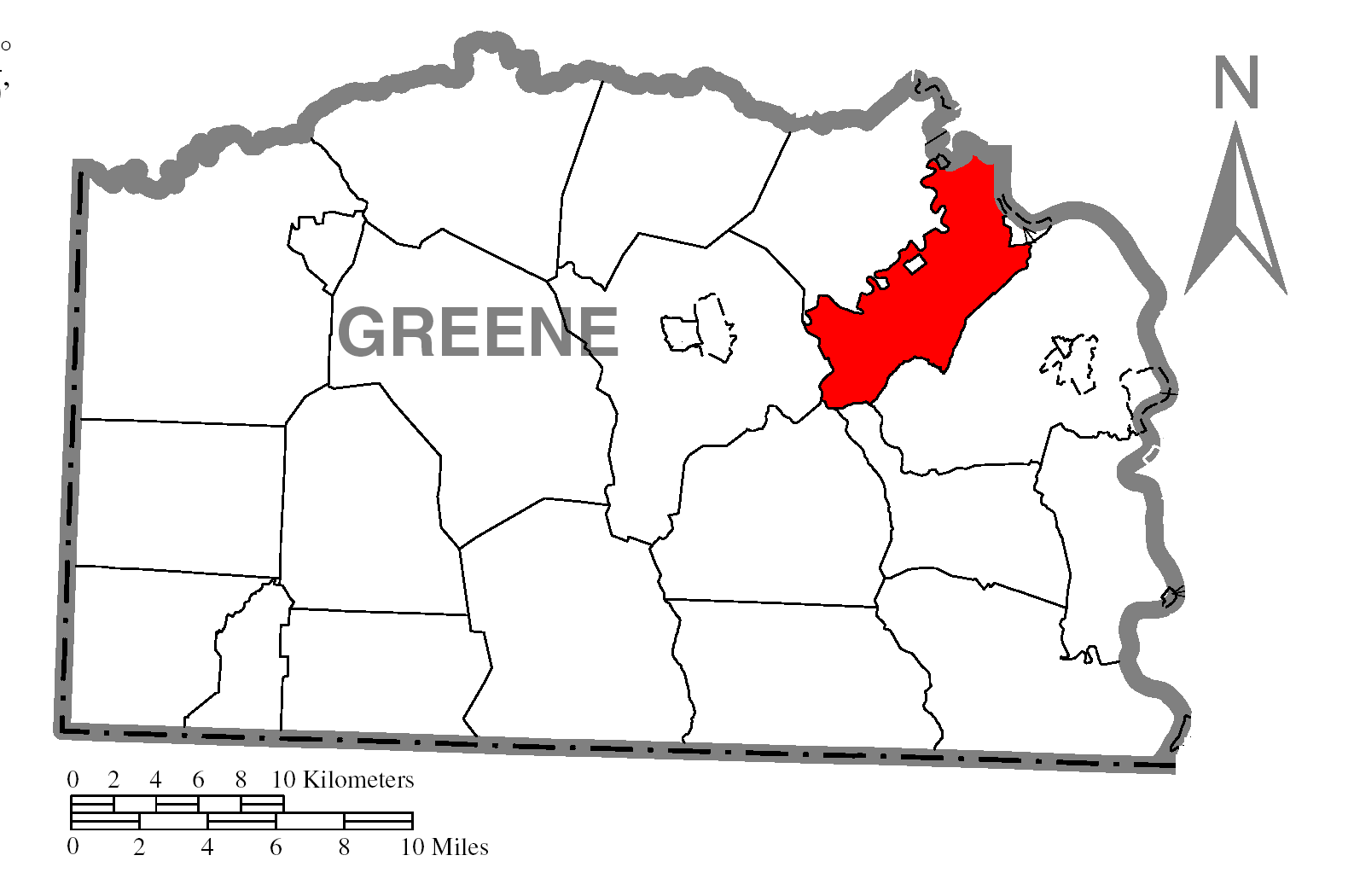
- Location of Jefferson Township in Greene County

- Location of Greene County in Pennsylvania
- Country: United States
- State: Pennsylvania
- County: Greene
- Named for: Thomas Jefferson

Government
  - Township Supervisor: Michael A. Devecka (Democratic)
  - Auditor: Dave Brichetti (Democratic)

Area
  - Total: 21.66 sq mi (56.11 km^{2})
  - Land: 21.54 sq mi (55.79 km^{2})
  - Water: 0.12 sq mi (0.32 km^{2})

Population (2020)
  - Total: 2,355 ▲
  - Estimate (2023): 2,247
  - Density: 105.1/sq mi (40.58/km^{2})
- Time zone: UTC-4 (EST)
  - Summer (DST): UTC-5 (EDT)
- Area code: 724
- FIPS code: 42-059-37888

Jefferson Township is a township that is located in Greene County, Pennsylvania, United States. The population was 2,355 at the time of the 2020 census, a little more than the 2,352 at the 2010 census.

== Geography ==
Jefferson Township is located in northeastern Greene County, and is bordered at its northeastern end by the Monongahela River, which forms the Fayette County line. The northern border of the township follows Tenmile Creek, a tributary of the Monongahela, and the longer northwestern border of the township follows the South Fork of Tenmile Creek.

The borough of Jefferson, a separate municipality, is surrounded by the northwestern part of the township. The borough of Rices Landing borders part of the northeastern edge of the township, and the borough of Clarksville borders the northern edge of the township, across the South Fork of Tenmile Creek. Unincorporated communities in the township include Pitt Gas, Braden Plan, and Dry Tavern.

According to the United States Census Bureau, the township has a total area of 21.7 square miles (56.1 km^{2}), of which 21.5 square miles (55.8 km^{2}) is land and 0.12 square miles (0.3 km^{2}), or 0.57%, is water.

== Demographics ==
Historical population
Census	Pop.	Note	%±
1930	1,790		—
1940	2,546		42.2%
1950	2,886		13.4%
1960	2,591		−10.2%
1970	2,207		−14.8%
1980	2,671		21.0%
1990	2,536		−5.1%
2000	2,528		−0.3%
2010	2,352		−7.0%
2020	2,355		0.1%
2025 (est.)	2,210		−6.2%
U.S. Decennial Census

As of the census of 2000, there were 2,528 people, 1,016 households, and 750 families residing in the township.

The population density was 116.8 inhabitants per square mile (45.1/km^{2}). There were 1,087 housing units at an average density of 50.2 per square mile (19.4/km^{2}).

The racial makeup of the township was 96.24% White, 2.77% African American, 0.32% Native American, 0.28% Asian, and 0.40% from two or more races. Hispanic or Latino of any race were 0.55% of the population.

There were 1,016 households, out of which 27.4% had children under the age of eighteen living with them; 61.5% were married couples living together, 9.5% had a female householder with no husband present, and 26.1% were non-families. 22.7% of all households were made up of individuals, and 13.2% had someone living alone who was sixty-five years of age or older.

The average household size was 2.47 and the average family size was 2.89.

Within the township, the population was spread out, with 20.3% under the age of eighteen, 6.6% from eighteen to twenty-four, 26.0% from twenty-five to forty-four, 27.3% from forty-five to sixty-four, and 19.9% who were sixty-five years of age or older. The median age was forty-three years.

For every one hundred females, there were 88.7 males. For every one hundred females who were aged eighteen or older, there were 88.1 males.

The median income for a household in the township was $31,639, and the median income for a family was $39,565. Males had a median income of $37,700 compared with that of $20,566 for females.

The per capita income for the township was $17,143.

Approximately 9.0% of families and 9.3% of the population were living below the poverty line, including 10.3% of those who were under the age of eighteen and 10.3% of those who were aged sixty-five or older.

== Education ==
The school district is Jefferson-Morgan School District.
