= Greene County, Pennsylvania =

County in Pennsylvania, United States

- County
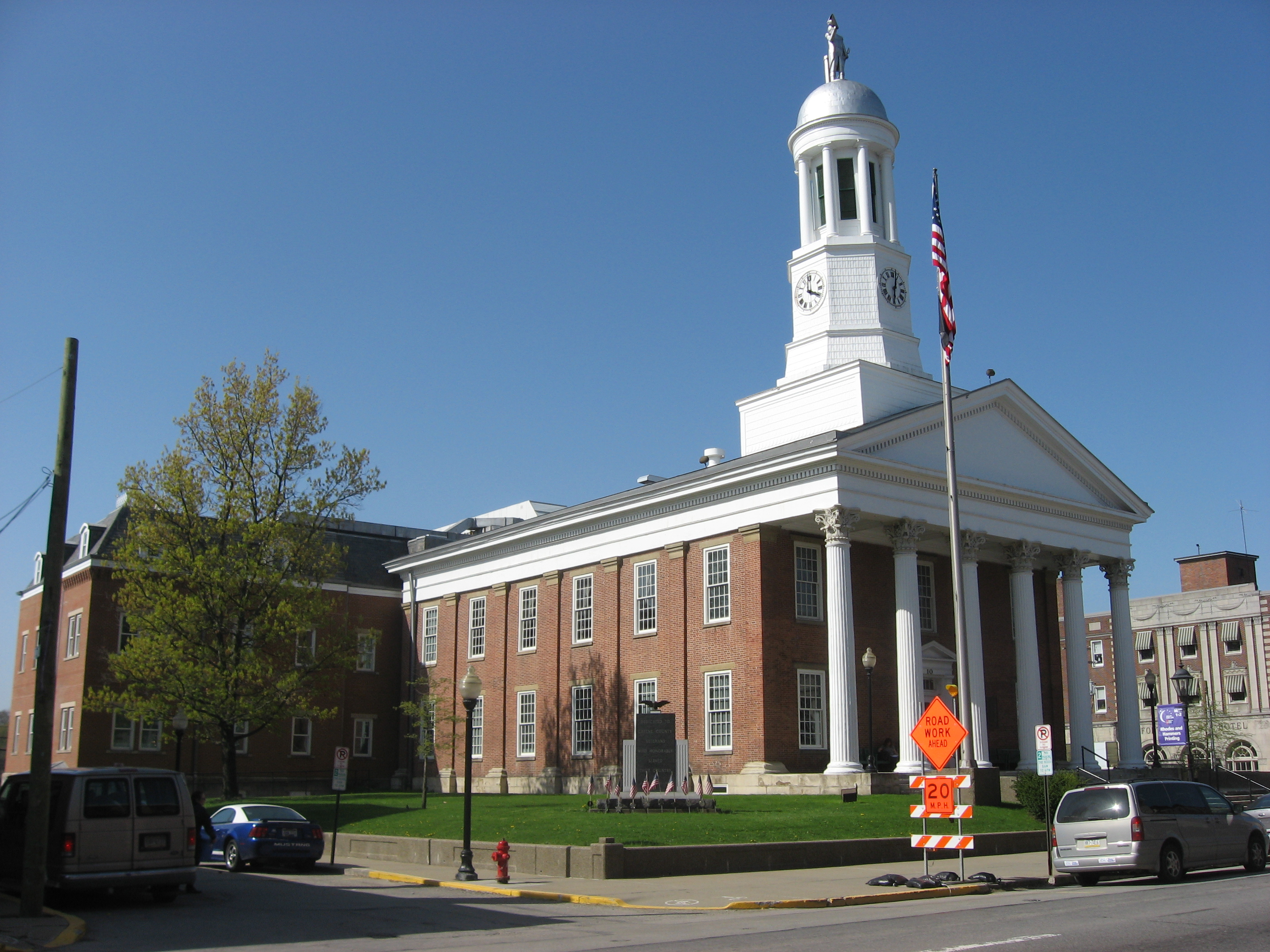
- Greene County Courthouse

- Flag Seal

- Location within the U.S. state of Pennsylvania
- Coordinates: 39°52′N 80°13′W
- Country: United States
- State: Pennsylvania
- Founded: February 9, 1796
- Named for: Nathanael Greene
- Seat: Waynesburg
- Largest borough: Waynesburg

Government
  - Chairman of the Board of Commissioners: Jared Edgreen (R)

Area
  - Total: 578 sq mi (1,500 km^{2})
  - Land: 576 sq mi (1,490 km^{2})
  - Water: 2.0 sq mi (5.2 km^{2}) 0.4%

Population (2020)
  - Total: 35,954
  - Estimate (2025): 33,885 ▼
  - Density: 62/sq mi (24/km^{2})
- Time zone: UTC−5 (Eastern)
  - Summer (DST): UTC−4 (EDT)
- Congressional district: 14th
- Website: https://greenecountypa.gov/

Greene County is a county in the Commonwealth of Pennsylvania. As of the 2020 census, the population was 35,954. Its county seat is Waynesburg. Greene County is part of the Pittsburgh media market. The county is part of the Southwest region of the commonwealth. (Note: Includes Westmoreland, Cambria, Fayette, Blair, Indiana, Somerset, Bedford, Huntingdon, Greene and Fulton Counties)

== History ==
A significant Native American village, now known as The Fisher Site, was once located in what is now Richhill Township.

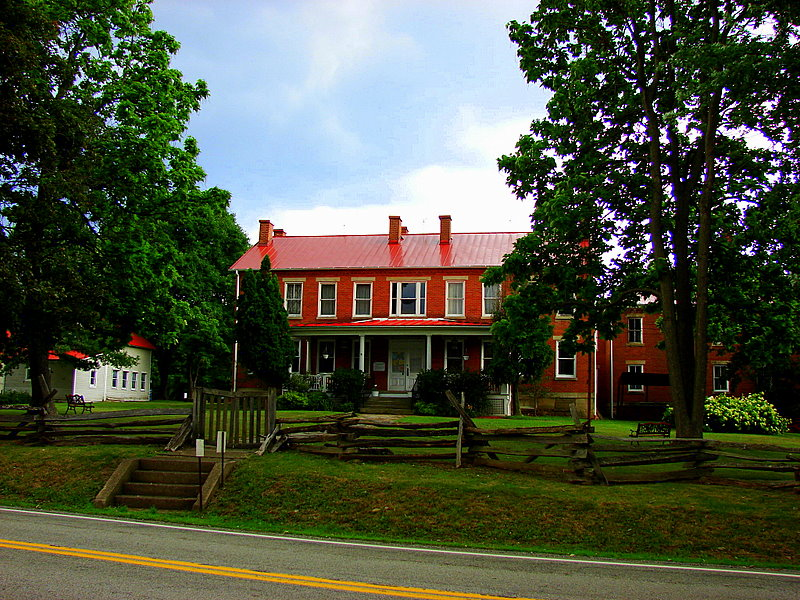
Greene County Historical Society

One researcher claims that the first white (non-Native Americans) settlers in what later became Greene County were a Dr. Thomas Eckerlin and his two brothers, who lived at the mouth of Dunkard Creek beginning in 1745. Other early pioneers in the mid-1750s include the Provins and Cox families; they lived along Whiteley Creek and at Ten Mile on Castile Run respectively. John Armstrong settled on Muddy Creek and claimed to have the first white child born west of the Monongahela River.

Writing in 1875–1876, another researcher stated that early settlers were largely of Scots, Irish and German origin; that the county was the site of much conflict between early settlers and Native Americans; and that the Great Catawba Indian War Path crossed the Dunkard valley and ran south to Monongalia County, West Virginia.

What is now Greene County was originally claimed by Virginia. Later it was part of Washington County, Pennsylvania. The Pennsylvania State Legislature created Greene County on February 9, 1796. The capital, Waynesburg, was named after Anthony Wayne, a general in the American Revolutionary War and Native American conflicts.

Garards Fort, an unincorporated community southeast of Waynesburg, is known for the Revolutionary era Corbly family massacre.

== Geography ==
According to the U.S. Census Bureau, the county has a total area of 578 square miles (1,500 km^{2}), of which 576 square miles (1,490 km^{2}) is land. 2.0 square miles (5.2 km^{2}) (0.4%) is water.

=== Climate ===
The county has a humid continental climate (Köppen Dfa/Dfb) and average monthly temperatures in Waynesburg range from 28.9 °F in January to 71.9 °F in July. Greene County is one of the 423 counties served by the Appalachian Regional Commission, and it is identified as part of "Greater Appalachia" by Colin Woodard in his book American Nations: A History of the Eleven Rival Regional Cultures of North America. It is also located within the Laurel Highlands subrange, which consists of low plateaus and river valleys.

=== Minerals ===
Bituminous coal underlies much of the county and has been mined extensively (see "Economy"). Shale, sandstone and limestone are also present.

=== Rivers, Streams and Watersheds ===
Coal Lick Run was the site of early settlers' homes. Ruff Creek is said to be named for a Native American who lived nearby in pioneer days. Others include Tenmmile Creek, Dunkard Creek, and South Fork Tenmile Creek.

=== State Park ===
Ryerson Station State Park is on Duke Lake in Richhill township.

=== Adjacent counties ===
- Washington County (north)
- Fayette County (east)
- Monongalia County, West Virginia (south)
- Wetzel County, West Virginia (southwest)
- Marshall County, West Virginia (west)

== Demographics ==
Historical population
Census	Pop.	Note	%±
1800	8,605		—
1810	12,544		45.8%
1820	15,554		24.0%
1830	18,028		15.9%
1840	19,147		6.2%
1850	22,136		15.6%
1860	24,343		10.0%
1870	25,887		6.3%
1880	28,273		9.2%
1890	28,935		2.3%
1900	28,281		−2.3%
1910	28,882		2.1%
1920	30,804		6.7%
1930	41,767		35.6%
1940	44,671		7.0%
1950	45,394		1.6%
1960	39,457		−13.1%
1970	39,108		−0.9%
1980	40,476		3.5%
1990	39,550		−2.3%
2000	40,672		2.8%
2010	38,686		−4.9%
2020	35,954		−7.1%
2025 (est.)	33,885	▼	−5.8%

=== Racial and ethnic composition ===
Greene County, Pennsylvania – Racial and ethnic composition Note: the US Census treats Hispanic/Latino as an ethnic category. This table excludes Latinos from the racial categories and assigns them to a separate category. Hispanics/Latinos may be of any race.
Race / Ethnicity (NH = Non-Hispanic)	Pop 1980	Pop 1990	Pop 2000	Pop 2010	Pop 2020	% 1980	% 1990	% 2000	% 2010	% 2020
White alone (NH)	39,811	38,789	38,365	36,409	32,898	98.36%	98.08%	94.33%	94.11%	91.50%
Black or African American alone (NH)	311	365	1,579	1,272	1,062	0.77%	0.92%	3.88%	3.29%	2.95%
Native American or Alaska Native alone (NH)	52	68	54	59	69	0.13%	0.17%	0.13%	0.15%	0.19%
Asian alone (NH)	57	107	86	113	120	0.14%	0.27%	0.21%	0.29%	0.33%
Native Hawaiian or Pacific Islander alone (NH)	x	x	8	6	6	x	x	0.02%	0.02%	0.02%
Other race alone (NH)	7	12	5	10	63	0.02%	0.03%	0.01%	0.03%	0.18%
Mixed race or Multiracial (NH)	x	x	218	352	1,226	x	x	0.54%	0.91%	3.41%
Hispanic or Latino (any race)	238	209	357	465	510	0.59%	0.53%	0.88%	1.20%	1.42%
Total	40,476	39,550	40,672	38,686	35,954	100.00%	100.00%	100.00%	100.00%	100.00%

=== 2020 census ===
As of the 2020 census, the county had a population of 35,954. The median age was 43.7 years, 18.6% of residents were under the age of 18, and 20.2% of residents were 65 years of age or older. For every 100 females there were 109.3 males, and for every 100 females age 18 and over there were 109.6 males age 18 and over.

Racial and ethnic composition is detailed in the table below.

24.3% of residents lived in urban areas, while 75.7% lived in rural areas.

There were 14,058 households in the county, of which 26.4% had children under the age of 18 living in them. Of all households, 48.0% were married-couple households, 19.6% were households with a male householder and no spouse or partner present, and 24.9% were households with a female householder and no spouse or partner present. About 29.4% of all households were made up of individuals and 13.7% had someone living alone who was 65 years of age or older.

There were 16,138 housing units, of which 12.9% were vacant. Among occupied housing units, 73.4% were owner-occupied and 26.6% were renter-occupied. The homeowner vacancy rate was 1.9% and the rental vacancy rate was 9.1%.

=== 2010 census ===
As of the census of 2010, there were 38,686 people, 14,724 households, and 9,970 families residing in the county. The population density was 67 people per square mile (26 people/km^{2}). There were 16,678 housing units at an average density of 29 units per square mile (11/km^{2}). The racial makeup of the county was 94.6 percent White, 3.3 percent Black or African American, 0.2% Native American, 0.3 percent Asian, 0.0 percent Pacific Islander, 0.7 percent from other races, and 1.0% from two or more races. 1.2 percent of the population were Hispanic or Latino of any race.

There were 14,724 households, out of which 29.3 percent had children under the age of 18 living with them, 51.5 percent were married couples living together, 10.9 percent had a female householder with no husband present, and 32.3 percent were non-families. 27.0 percent of all households were made up of individuals, and 11.7 percent had someone living alone who was 65 years of age or older. The average household size was 2.42 and the average family size was 2.91.

The county population distribution by age was 19.9 percent under the age of 18, 9.9 percent from 18 to 24, 25.5 percent from 25 to 44, 29.3 percent from 45 to 64, and 15.3 percent who were 65 years of age or older. The median age was 41.1 years. For every 100 females there were 106.2 males. For every 100 females age 18 and over, there were 105.6 males.

== Government and politics ==
Greene County was long a Democratic stronghold, due to the strong unionization of the county's steel mills; between 1932 and 2000, the Democratic presidential candidate won the county in every election except in the Republican landslide of 1972. Due to the decline of the Pittsburgh area's steel industry (similar to other Appalachian counties), and the Democratic Party's shift on cultural issues like environmental safety and firearms, the county was a landslide for the Republican Party in 2024 for Donald Trump who won the county with 71.5% of the vote.

United States presidential election results for Greene County, Pennsylvania
Year	Republican		Democratic		Third party(ies)	
Year	No.	%	No.	%	No.	%
1888	2,373	35.79%	4,116	62.08%	141	2.13%
1892	2,126	33.39%	3,977	62.46%	264	4.15%
1896	2,453	36.41%	4,198	62.31%	86	1.28%
1900	2,427	39.02%	3,674	59.07%	119	1.91%
1904	2,442	41.32%	3,198	54.11%	270	4.57%
1908	2,438	37.22%	3,793	57.91%	319	4.87%
1912	1,150	19.00%	3,551	58.67%	1,351	22.32%
1916	2,096	33.93%	3,930	63.62%	151	2.44%
1920	4,253	42.41%	5,592	55.76%	183	1.82%
1924	4,590	41.82%	5,874	53.52%	512	4.66%
1928	6,910	56.18%	5,293	43.04%	96	0.78%
1932	4,808	33.42%	9,322	64.79%	258	1.79%
1936	6,359	34.42%	12,006	64.99%	109	0.59%
1940	6,726	39.62%	10,214	60.17%	36	0.21%
1944	5,747	40.49%	8,392	59.13%	53	0.37%
1948	4,717	36.47%	8,015	61.97%	202	1.56%
1952	6,964	40.68%	10,125	59.14%	30	0.18%
1956	7,562	43.45%	9,827	56.47%	14	0.08%
1960	7,498	43.70%	9,645	56.21%	16	0.09%
1964	3,896	25.42%	11,412	74.46%	19	0.12%
1968	5,099	35.41%	8,198	56.93%	1,104	7.67%
1972	7,790	57.52%	5,562	41.07%	191	1.41%
1976	5,293	37.22%	8,769	61.67%	157	1.10%
1980	5,336	37.79%	8,193	58.02%	592	4.19%
1984	6,376	40.40%	9,365	59.33%	43	0.27%
1988	4,879	34.62%	9,126	64.75%	90	0.64%
1992	3,482	23.01%	8,438	55.75%	3,215	21.24%
1996	4,002	29.14%	7,620	55.47%	2,114	15.39%
2000	5,890	43.14%	7,230	52.96%	533	3.90%
2004	7,786	50.02%	7,674	49.30%	105	0.67%
2008	7,889	48.96%	7,829	48.59%	396	2.46%
2012	8,428	57.94%	5,852	40.23%	266	1.83%
2016	10,849	68.37%	4,482	28.25%	537	3.38%
2020	12,579	71.08%	4,911	27.75%	207	1.17%
2024	12,319	71.47%	4,592	26.64%	325	1.89%

United States Senate election results for Greene County, Pennsylvania1
Year	Republican		Democratic		Third party(ies)	
Year	No.	%	No.	%	No.	%
1994	4,505	37.97%	6,932	58.42%	429	3.62%
2000	5,935	42.50%	7,636	54.68%	393	2.81%
2006	4,637	36.47%	8,078	63.53%	0	0.00%
2012	7,262	50.79%	6,768	47.33%	269	1.88%
2018	6,422	51.67%	5,819	46.82%	187	1.50%
2024	11,643	67.91%	5,075	29.60%	427	2.49%

United States Senate election results for Greene County, Pennsylvania3
Year	Republican		Democratic		Third party(ies)	
Year	No.	%	No.	%	No.	%
1992	5,996	40.30%	8,248	55.44%	634	4.26%
1998	4,742	52.68%	3,991	44.33%	269	2.99%
2004	7,783	49.62%	6,794	43.32%	1,108	7.06%
2010	5,502	50.09%	5,483	49.91%	0	0.00%
2016	8,826	57.26%	5,692	36.93%	896	5.81%
2022	8,348	63.77%	4,394	33.57%	349	2.67%

Pennsylvania Gubernatorial election results for Greene County
Year	Republican		Democratic		Third party(ies)	
Year	No.	%	No.	%	No.	%
1970	3,496	32.09%	7,228	66.35%	170	1.56%
1974	5,448	48.79%	5,588	50.04%	130	1.16%
1978	4,029	35.67%	7,215	63.87%	52	0.46%
1982	4,557	37.75%	7,463	61.83%	50	0.41%
1986	3,748	33.16%	7,476	66.15%	78	0.69%
1990	2,157	21.24%	7,998	78.76%	0	0.00%
1994	4,314	36.92%	6,167	52.77%	1,205	10.31%
1998	4,211	45.88%	3,900	42.49%	1,067	11.63%
2002	4,209	44.52%	5,013	53.02%	233	2.46%
2006	5,670	44.56%	7,055	55.44%	0	0.00%
2010	6,000	53.80%	5,153	46.20%	0	0.00%
2014	4,080	43.82%	5,230	56.18%	0	0.00%
2018	6,381	51.26%	5,844	46.95%	223	1.79%
2022	7,706	58.65%	5,142	39.14%	291	2.21%

=== Voter registration ===
As of February 8, 2025, there are 21,629 registered voters in the county. There are 11,762 registered Republicans, 7,727 registered Democrats, 1,542 voters registered non-affiliated voters, and 598 voters registered to other parties.

Chart of Voter Registration
1. Republican (54.4%)
2. Democratic (35.7%)
3. Independent (7.13%)
4. Other Parties (2.76%)

Voter Registration and Party Enrollment
Party	Number of Voters	Percentage
Republican	11,762	54.38%
Democratic	7,727	35.73%
Independent	1,542	7.13%
Third Parties	598	2.76%
Total	21,629	100%

=== Commissioners ===
Greene County is administered by a three-person board of commissioners, who serve four-year terms. Elections occur in the odd-numbered years that precede U.S. presidential elections, with the most recent election falling in 2023. All three commissioners are chosen in the same election, and voters may vote for no more than two of the candidates. The commissioners are responsible for the management of the fiscal and administrative functions of the county.

Official	Party	Term ends
Jared Edgreen	Republican	2027
Betsy McClure	Republican	2027
Blair Zimmerman	Democratic	2027

=== Elected county officials ===
As of the 2021 and 2023 General Elections.

Office	Official	Party	Term ends
Magisterial Court Judge	David Balint	Independent	2027
Magisterial Court Judge	Tom Ankrom	Independent	2027
Clerk of Courts	Crystal Walters	Independent	2027
Controller	Ami Cree	Independent	2027
Coroner	Gene Rush	Republican	2025
Treasurer	Jeannie High Grimes	Independent	2027
District Attorney	Brianna Vanata	Republican	2027
Prothonotary	Jennifer Maas	Republican	2027
Recorder of Deeds and Register of Wills	Tammy Brookover	Republican	2027
Sheriff	Marcus N. Simms	Independent	2025

=== Pennsylvania House of Representatives ===
Greene County consists of one Pennsylvania House District. The 50th district covers all of Greene County and parts of Washington County to the north.

District	Representative	Party
50	Donald "Bud" Cook	Republican

=== Pennsylvania Senate ===
Greene County is entirely contained within the 46th Senatorial District, which also includes parts of Beaver County and all of Washington County.

District	Senator	Party
46	Camera Bartolotta	Republican

=== United States House of Representatives ===
Greene County is part of the 14th Congressional District.

District	Representative	Party
14	Guy Reschenthaler	Republican

=== United States Senate ===
Senator	Party
John Fetterman	Democratic
Dave McCormick	Republican

== Economy ==
Coal and natural gas have a long history in Greene County. A 19th century history lists numerous prominent citizens involved in the coal industry. Some 200 deaths were caused by the Mather Mine disaster of 1928. The Shannopin coal mine extracted coal from the Pittsburgh Seam from 1926 until it closed in 1993. Hatfield's Ferry, a coal-burning power plant near Monongahela Township, was a significant source of employment for local residents for over 40 years. It was shut down in 2013 and dismantled in 2023.

Core Natural Resources' Bailey and Harvey underground coal mines are located in Greene County and are operational as of October 2026.

Natural gas extraction, including fracking the Marcellus Shale formation, is prevalent in the county. While it has brought new jobs to the area, opponents claim the process contaminates drinking water. A U.S. Geological Survey report notes that it creates "potentially serious landscape disturbances."

Greene County is home to Hill Top Energy Center, a modern 665-megawatt natural gas-fired power plant built on the site of a former coal mine. Blackstone Energy Transition Partners acquired the plant in 2025.

In August 2025 International Electric Power announced plans to build a 944-megawatt natural gas-fired power plant in Greene County to power a proposed data center. State and federal approvals for the new power plant will be required.

State Correctional Institution – Greene (SCI Greene), located in Waynesburg, provides jobs for about 670 people.

Greene County's development commission has assisted area businesses since 1998. Meadow Ridge Business Park has served the county since the early 2000s.

== Education ==
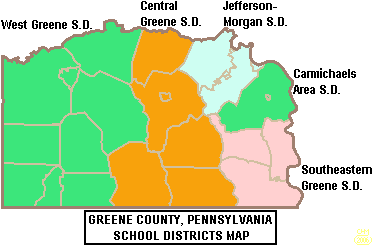
Map of Greene County, Pennsylvania School Districts

=== Colleges and universities ===
- Waynesburg University

=== Public school districts ===
Greene County is divided into five public school districts. There are 15 public schools that serve Greene County, Pennsylvania.

- Carmichaels Area School District
- Central Greene School District
- Jefferson-Morgan School District
- Southeastern Greene School District
- West Greene School District

Some schools within the five above districts include:

- Greene County Career and Technology Center
- East Franklin School - Waynesburg

=== Private schools ===
- Open Door Christian School in Waynesburg (grades K-12)
- Greene Valley Christian Academy in Rices Landing (grades K-8)

=== Libraries ===
- Eva K Bowlby Public Library in Waynesburg
- Flenniken Public Library in Carmichaels, Pennsylvania

== Transportation ==
=== Interstate Highways ===
- I-79

=== State Highways ===
- US 19
- PA 18
- PA 21
- PA 88
- PA 188
- PA 218
- PA 221

=== Airport ===
Greene County Airport is a county-owned, public-use airport located two nautical miles (4 km) east of the central business district of Waynesburg, Pennsylvania.

== Communities ==
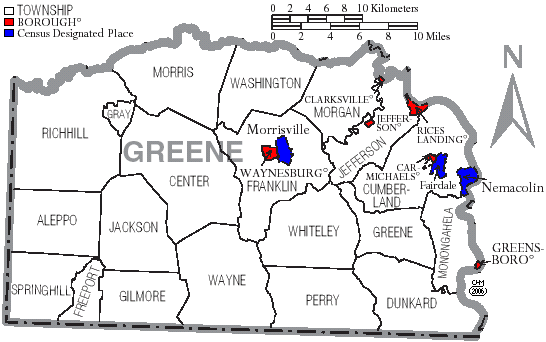
Map of Greene County, Pennsylvania with Municipal Labels showing Boroughs (red), Townships (white), and Census-designated places (blue).

Under Pennsylvania law, there are four types of incorporated municipalities: cities, boroughs, townships, and, in at most two cases, towns. The following boroughs and townships are located in Greene County:

=== Boroughs ===
- Carmichaels
- Clarksville
- Greensboro
- Jefferson
- Rices Landing
- Waynesburg (county seat)

=== Townships ===
- Aleppo
- Center
- Cumberland
- Dunkard
- Franklin
- Freeport
- Gilmore
- Gray
- Greene
- Jackson
- Jefferson
- Monongahela
- Morgan
- Morris
- Perry
- Richhill
- Springhill
- Washington
- Wayne
- Whiteley

=== Census-designated places ===
Census-designated places are geographical areas designated by the U.S. Census Bureau for the purposes of compiling demographic data. They are not actual jurisdictions under Pennsylvania law. Other unincorporated communities, such as villages, may be listed here as well.

- Bobtown
- Brave
- Crucible
- Dry Tavern
- Fairdale
- Mapletown
- Mather
- Morrisville
- Mount Morris
- Nemacolin
- New Freeport
- Rogersville
- West Waynesburg
- Wind Ridge

=== Population ranking ===
The population ranking of the following table is based on the 2020 census of Greene County.

† county seat

Rank	City/Town/etc.	Municipal type	Population (2020 Census)
1	† Waynesburg	Borough	4,006
2	Fairdale	CDP	2,064
3	Morrisville	CDP	1,209
4	Nemacolin	CDP	826
5	Bobtown	CDP	701
6	Crucible	CDP	673
7	Mather	CDP	659
8	Dry Tavern	CDP	655
9	Mount Morris	CDP	645
10	Carmichaels	Borough	432
11	Rices Landing	Borough	425
12	West Waynesburg	CDP	401
13	Greensboro	Borough	264
14	Jefferson	Borough	253
15	Rogersville	CDP	215
16	Wind Ridge	CDP	204
17	Clarksville	Borough	203
18	Brave	CDP	142
19	Mapletown	CDP	125
20	New Freeport	CDP	77

== Photo gallery ==
Click photo to enlarge

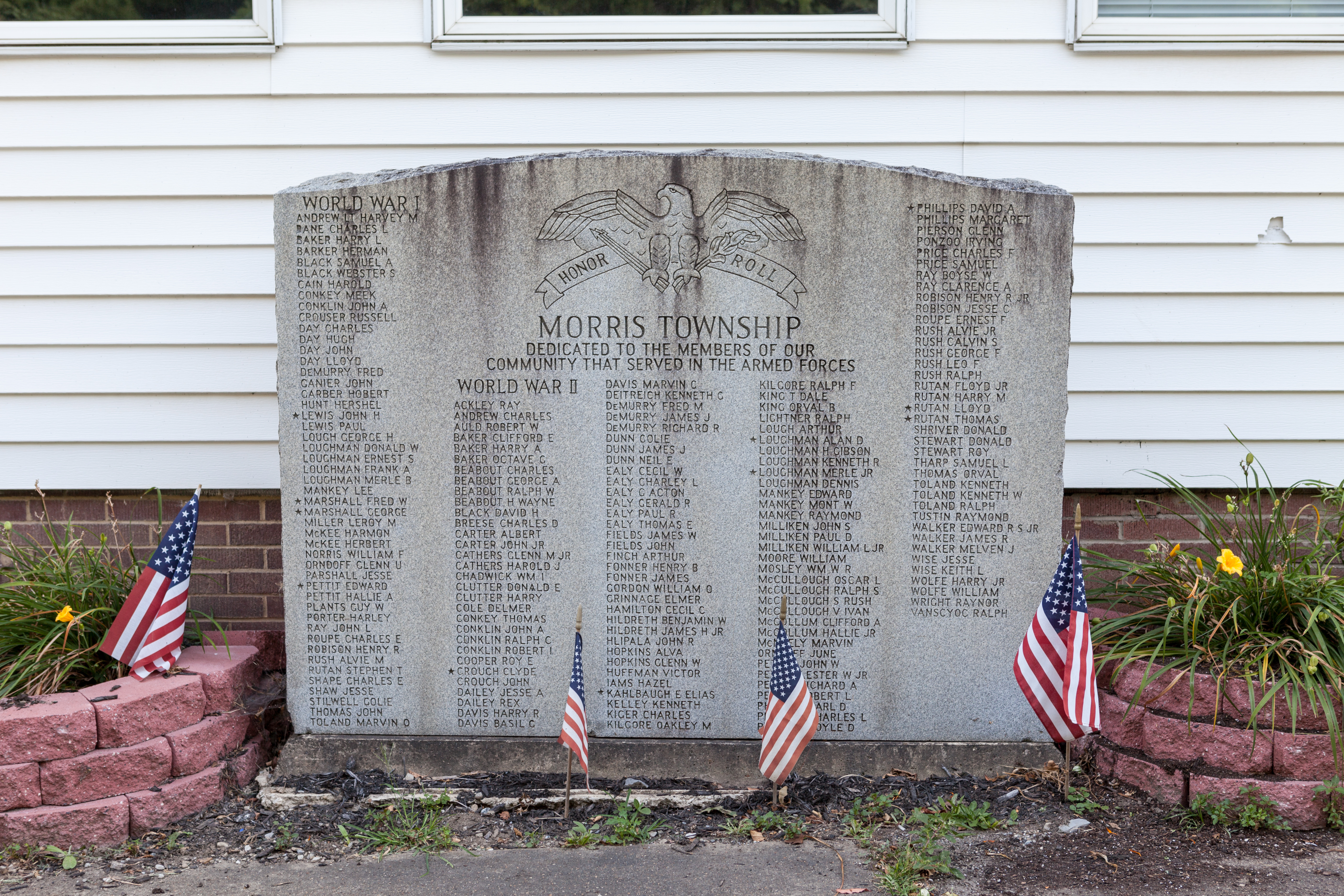
Veterans memorial, Morris Township

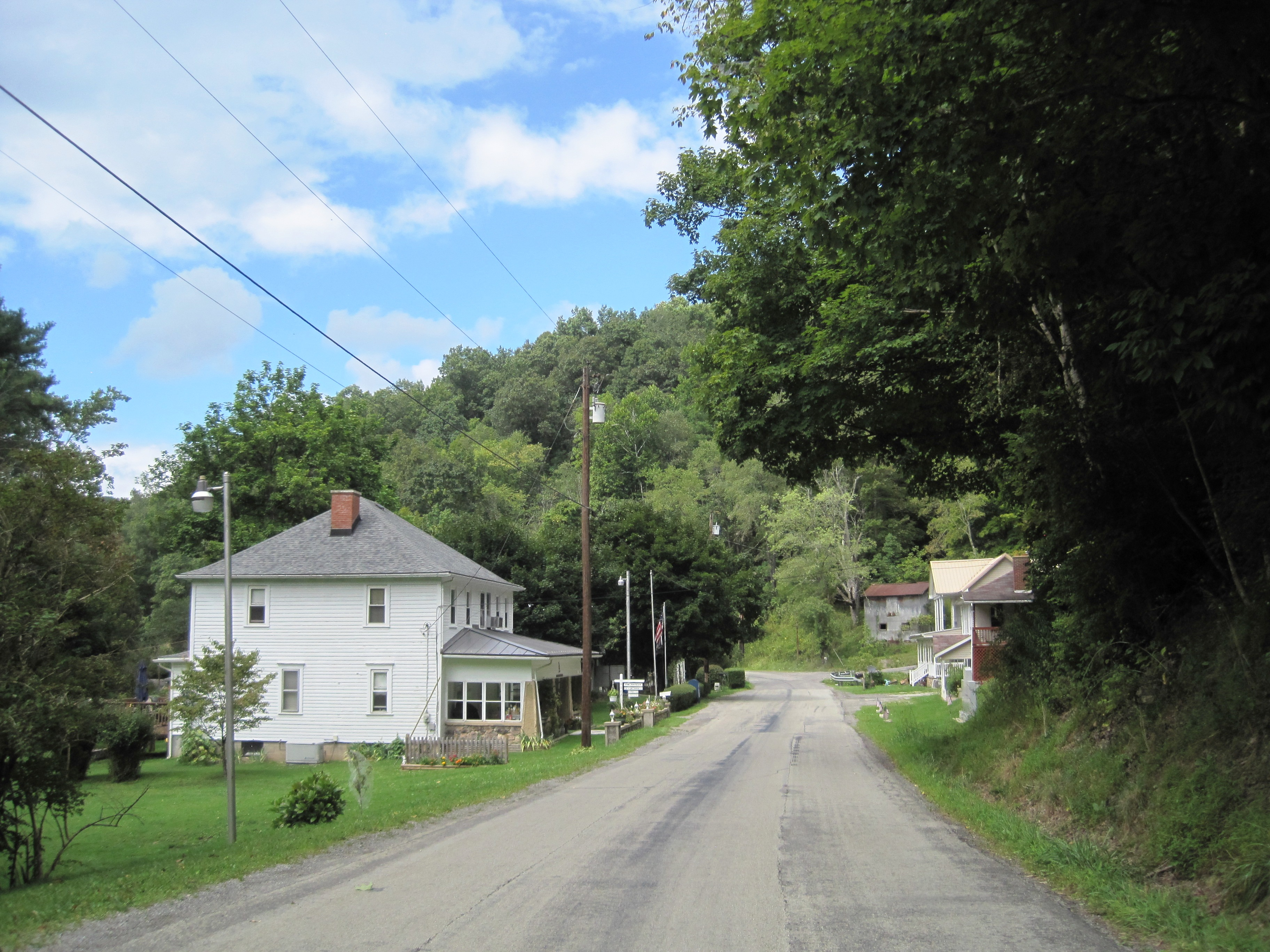
Village of Aleppo

Nemacolin Coal Mine, 1930

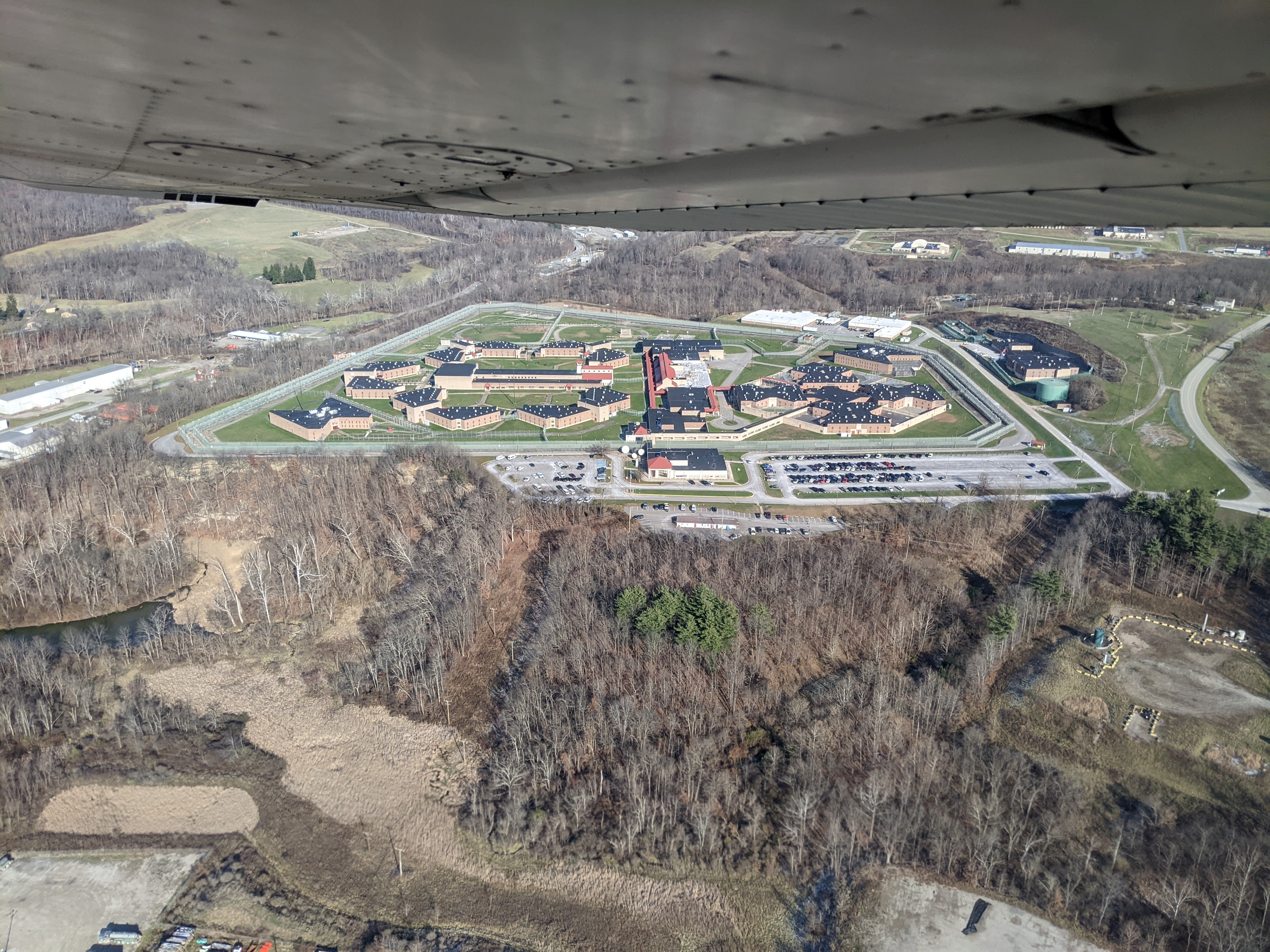
State Correctional Institution, Waynesburg

== See also ==
- Greene Connections: Greene County, Pennsylvania Archives Project
- National Register of Historic Places listings in Greene County, Pennsylvania
