= Jefferson, Greene County, Pennsylvania =

Borough in Pennsylvania, US

- Borough
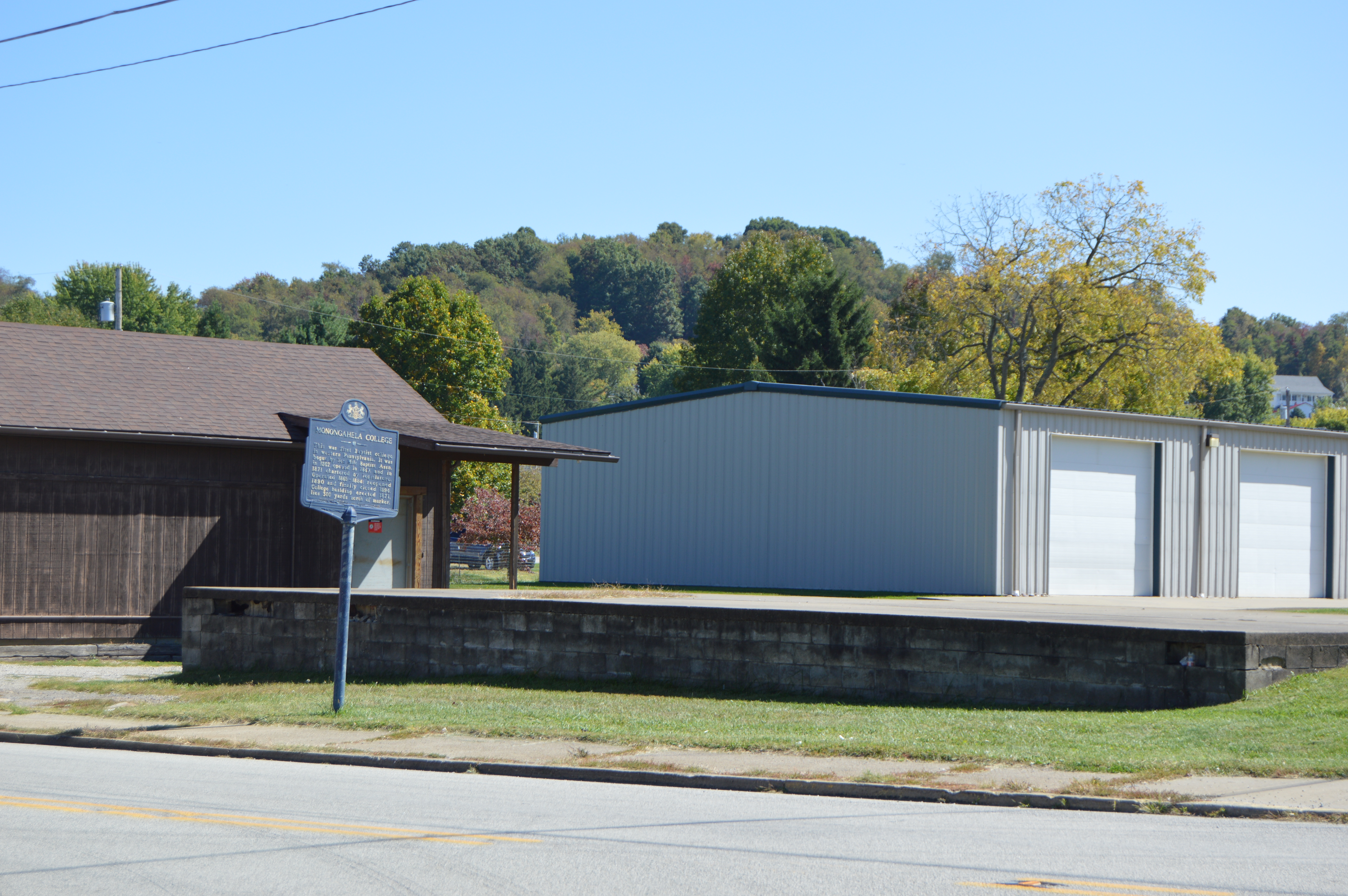
- Site of the former Monongahela College on Pennsylvania Route 188
- Etymology: Thomas Jefferson
- Location of Jefferson in Greene County, Pennsylvania.

- Location within Pennsylvania Location within the United States
- Coordinates: 39°55′49″N 80°3′32″W
- Country: United States
- State: Pennsylvania
- County: Greene
- Established: 1795
- Named for: Thomas Jefferson

Government
  - Body: Jefferson Borough Council
  - Mayor: Dale E. Harshman (Democrat)
  - Tax Collector: Signa Coneybeer (Democrat)

Area
  - Total: 0.19 sq mi (0.49 km^{2})
  - Land: 0.19 sq mi (0.49 km^{2})
  - Water: 0 sq mi (0.00 km^{2})
- Elevation: 960 ft (290 m)

Population (2020)
  - Total: 253
  - Estimate (2023): 241
  - Density: 1,346.7/sq mi (519.98/km^{2})
- Time zone: UTC-4 (EST)
  - Summer (DST): UTC-5 (EDT)
- ZIP code: 15344
- Area code: 724
- FIPS code: 42-37880

Jefferson is a borough in Greene County, Pennsylvania, United States. The population was 253 at the 2020 census, a decline from the figure of 270 tabulated in 2010. The borough was named after Thomas Jefferson.

== Geography ==
Jefferson is located in northeastern Greene County at 39°55′49″N 80°3′32″W (39.930322, -80.058993). It is surrounded by Jefferson Township, a separate municipality. Pennsylvania Route 188 (Jefferson Road) passes through the center of the borough, leading east 3 miles (5 km) to Dry Tavern and west 7 miles (11 km) to Waynesburg, the county seat.

According to the United States Census Bureau, the borough has a total area of 0.19 square miles (0.49 km^{2}), all land. The South Fork of Tenmile Creek passes just north of the borough.

== Demographics ==
Historical population
Census	Pop.	Note	%±
1880	347		—
1890	327		−5.8%
1900	311		−4.9%
1910	357		14.8%
1920	392		9.8%
1930	528		34.7%
1940	557		5.5%
1950	575		3.2%
1960	442		−23.1%
1970	366		−17.2%
1980	413		12.8%
1990	355		−14.0%
2000	337		−5.1%
2010	270		−19.9%
2020	253		−6.3%
2025 (est.)	239		−5.5%

As of the census of 2000, there were 337 people, 139 households, and 97 families residing in the borough. The population density was 1,801.8 inhabitants per square mile (695.7/km^{2}). There were 147 housing units at an average density of 786.0 per square mile (303.5/km^{2}). The racial makeup of the borough was 99.41% White, 0.30% African American, and 0.30% from two or more races.

There were 139 households, out of which 30.2% had children under the age of 18 living with them, 52.5% were married couples living together, 11.5% had a female householder with no husband present, and 30.2% were non-families. 25.9% of all households were made up of individuals, and 14.4% had someone living alone who was 65 years of age or older. The average household size was 2.42 and the average family size was 2.91.

In the borough the population was spread out, with 25.2% under the age of 18, 4.7% from 18 to 24, 26.7% from 25 to 44, 22.8% from 45 to 64, and 20.5% who were 65 years of age or older. The median age was 41 years. For every 100 females there were 93.7 males. For every 100 females age 18 and over, there were 89.5 males.

The median income for a household in the borough was $33,750, and the median income for a family was $40,893. Males had a median income of $28,958 versus $14,219 for females. The per capita income for the borough was $15,294. About 8.9% of families and 7.8% of the population were below the poverty line, including 3.8% of those under age 18 and 16.7% of those age 65 or over.
