= National Register of Historic Places listings in Greene County, Pennsylvania =

Location of Greene County in Pennsylvania

This is a list of the National Register of Historic Places listings in Greene County, Pennsylvania.

This is intended to be a complete list of the properties and districts on National Register of Historic Places in Greene County, Pennsylvania, United States. The locations of National Register properties and districts for which the latitude and longitude coordinates are included below, may be seen in a map.

There are 44 properties and districts listed on the National Register in the county, including one National Historic Landmark. One property was once listed, but has since been removed.

This National Park Service list is complete through NPS recent listings posted September 4, 2026.

== Current listings ==
	Name on the Register	Image	Date listed	Location	Municipality	Description
1	Alexander V. Boughner House	Alexander V. Boughner House	March 9, 1995 (#95000114)	Junction of 2nd and Minor Streets; 39°47′31″N 79°54′50″W	Greensboro	
2	Bridge in Franklin Township	Bridge in Franklin Township	June 22, 1988 (#88000766)	Pennsylvania Route 188 over Ten Mile Creek at Morrisville; 39°54′08″N 80°09′20″W	Franklin Township	
3	Carmichaels Covered Bridge	Carmichaels Covered Bridge	June 22, 1979 (#79003815)	Old Town Road and Muddy Creek; 39°53′55″N 79°58′38″W	Carmichaels	
4	Colver-Rogers Farmstead	Colver-Rogers Farmstead	November 21, 2003 (#03001191)	East of State Route 1011 at Township 159, north of Jefferson; 39°56′29″N 80°03′41″W	Morgan Township	
5	John Corbley Farm	John Corbley Farm	May 3, 1984 (#84003380)	North of Garards Fort; 39°49′32″N 80°01′33″W	Greene Township	
6	John Minor Crawford House	John Minor Crawford House	July 27, 1995 (#95000122)	State Route 2014 in Glassworks; 39°48′04″N 79°54′50″W	Monongahela Township	
7	William Crawford House	William Crawford House	November 12, 1992 (#92001496)	Off the junction of Brown's Ferry Road and Stevenson's Lane, east of Carmichaels; 39°53′39″N 79°56′57″W	Cumberland Township	
8	William Cree House	William Cree House	July 15, 2002 (#01000678)	Western side of State Route 1011, 0.1 miles (0.16 km) north of Pennsylvania Route 21; 39°53′29″N 80°02′44″W	Jefferson Township	
9	Horn Davis Overholtzer Bridge	Horn Davis Overholtzer Bridge	June 22, 1979 (#79002354)	Southeast of Fairfield; 40°00′29″N 80°03′45″W	Morgan Township	The bridge collapsed in 1994. It extended into Washington County
10	Fisher Site (36GR21)	Fisher Site (36GR21)	November 15, 1982 (#82001536)	Off Camp Resort Road along Enlow Fork Wheeling Creek, south of West Finley; 39°57′36″N 80°28′00″W	Richhill Township	
11	Richard T. Foley Site (36GR52)	Richard T. Foley Site (36GR52)	May 10, 1984 (#84003385)	Along Job Creek, southwest of Holbrook; 39°49′51″N 80°22′54″W	Jackson Township	
12	Glassworks-Core House	Glassworks-Core House	July 27, 1995 (#95000121)	State Route 2014 in Glassworks; 39°48′00″N 79°54′48″W	Monongahela Township	
13	Glassworks-Gabler House	Glassworks-Gabler House	July 27, 1995 (#95000120)	State Route 2014 in Glassworks; 39°48′00″N 79°54′48″W	Monongahela Township	Google Earth images show this house was present in 1995, but missing in 2005 and subsequent images; it has been demolished.
14	George West Gordon Farm	George West Gordon Farm	August 24, 2000 (#00000965)	333 Mary Hoge Road, 0.3 miles (0.48 km) southwest of Gordon Hill; 39°51′21″N 80°09′14″W	Whiteley Township	
15	Greene Academy	Greene Academy	December 12, 1976 (#76001643)	314 North Market Street; 39°53′58″N 79°58′38″W	Carmichaels	
16	Greene Hills Farm	Greene Hills Farm	April 23, 1973 (#73001634)	3.5 miles (5.6 km) east of Waynesburg on Pennsylvania Route 21; 39°53′20″N 80°07′29″W	Franklin Township	
17	Greensboro Historic District	Greensboro Historic District	November 17, 1995 (#95000118)	Roughly bounded by County, Second, Walnut, Front and Clear Streets and the Monongahela River; 39°47′29″N 79°54′45″W	Greensboro	
18	Greensboro Public School	Greensboro Public School	March 9, 1995 (#95000113)	Junction of Second and Clear Streets; 39°47′36″N 79°54′45″W	Greensboro	
19	Grimes Covered Bridge	Grimes Covered Bridge	June 22, 1979 (#79003820)	Off Pennsylvania Route 221 at the crossing of Ruff Creek, north of Waynesburg; 39°57′16″N 80°09′35″W	Washington Township	The bridge was destroyed by a fire in 1992.
20	Hamilton-Ely Farmstead	Hamilton-Ely Farmstead	March 2, 2006 (#06000098)	1055 Sugar Run Road; 39°50′17″N 80°10′43″W	Whiteley Township	
21	Hanna Hall	Hanna Hall	April 18, 1979 (#79002235)	College Street; 39°53′58″N 80°11′13″W	Waynesburg	
22	Charles Grant Heasley House	Charles Grant Heasley House	February 21, 1991 (#91000091)	75 Sherman Avenue in the Bonar Addition, east of Waynesburg; 39°53′50″N 80°10′30″W	Franklin Township	
23	Hughes House	Hughes House	December 27, 1972 (#72001124)	Hatfield Street, north of Jefferson; 39°55′58″N 80°03′36″W	Jefferson Township	
24	James Jones House	James Jones House	March 9, 1995 (#95000112)	Junction of Front and Stone Streets; 39°47′37″N 79°54′41″W	Greensboro	
25	Thomas Kent, Jr., Farm	Thomas Kent, Jr., Farm	August 16, 2000 (#00000882)	208 Laurel Run Road, south of Waynesburg; 39°52′24″N 80°10′00″W	Franklin Township	
26	King Covered Bridge	King Covered Bridge	June 22, 1979 (#79003816)	South of Kuhntown at the crossing of Hoover Run; 39°45′25″N 80°16′21″W	Wayne Township	
27	Lippincott Covered Bridge	Lippincott Covered Bridge	June 22, 1979 (#79003823)	Off Pennsylvania Route 221 at the crossing of Ruff Creek, northeast of Waynesburg; 39°56′36″N 80°07′35″W	Morgan Township	
28	Marion Bridge	Marion Bridge	June 22, 1988 (#88000841)	Pennsylvania Route 88 over the Monongahela River; 39°44′22″N 79°54′19″W	Dunkard Township	Demolished November 16, 2009. Extended into Fayette County.
29	Mason and Dixon Survey Terminal Point	Mason and Dixon Survey Terminal Point	June 25, 1973 (#73001922)	2.25 miles (3.62 km) northeast of Pentress on Monongalia County Route 39; 39°43′16″N 80°07′07″W	Perry Township	Extends into Monongalia County, West Virginia
30	McClelland-Grimes Farm	McClelland-Grimes Farm	June 28, 2010 (#09000386)	844 Craynes Run Rd. 39°57′44″N 80°09′00″W	Morgan and Washington Townships	
31	Miller Hall	Miller Hall	April 14, 1978 (#78002405)	51 West College Street; 39°53′58″N 80°11′17″W	Waynesburg	
32	James Parreco House	James Parreco House	March 9, 1995 (#95000115)	Junction of Third and Clear Streets; 39°47′38″N 79°54′48″W	Greensboro	
33	Peters-Graham House	Peters-Graham House	March 9, 1995 (#95000116)	Junction of Walnut and Second Streets; 39°47′34″N 79°54′47″W	Greensboro	
34	Reppert-Gabler House	Reppert-Gabler House	July 27, 1995 (#95000117)	State Route 2014 in Glassworks; 39°47′58″N 79°54′49″W	Monongahela Township	
35	John Rex Farm	John Rex Farm	May 8, 1998 (#98000443)	0.5 miles (0.80 km) east of Jefferson on Pennsylvania Route 188; 39°56′16″N 80°02′54″W	Jefferson Township	
36	Rice's Landing Historic District	Rice's Landing Historic District	December 24, 1992 (#92001723)	Roughly bounded by the Monongahela River, Water, Second, Bayard, Carmichael, High, Main and Ferry including Pumpkin Run Peak; 39°56′57″N 80°00′00″W	Rices Landing	
37	Scott Covered Bridge	Scott Covered Bridge	June 22, 1979 (#79003819)	Covered Bridge Road off Pennsylvania Route 21 at the crossing of Ten Mile Creek, west of Rogersville; 39°53′15″N 80°19′33″W	Center Township	
38	Shriver Covered Bridge	Shriver Covered Bridge	June 22, 1979 (#79003821)	South of Rogersville at the crossing of Harqus Creek; 39°51′09″N 80°16′46″W	Center Township	
39	Sugar Grove Petroglyph Site (36GR5)	Sugar Grove Petroglyph Site (36GR5)	March 20, 1986 (#86000476)	Off Pennsylvania Route 88, 0.7 miles (1.1 km) northwest of its bridge over Whiteley Creek; 39°49′36″N 79°57′40″W	Monongahela Township	
40	Ernest Thralls House	Ernest Thralls House	May 12, 1999 (#99000513)	Pennsylvania Route 218 at Township Routes 353 and 522, south of Spraggs; 39°45′07″N 80°13′04″W	Wayne Township	Demolished ca. 2006 due to mine subsidence.
41	Waynesburg Historic District	Waynesburg Historic District	March 1, 1984 (#84003392)	Roughly bounded by 2nd Alley, Cherry Avenue, East and Bowlby Streets; 39°53′51″N 80°11′18″W	Waynesburg	
42	White Covered Bridge	White Covered Bridge	June 22, 1979 (#79003822)	Roberts Run Road, west of Garards Fort at the crossing of Whiteley Creek; 39°48′24″N 80°03′39″W	Greene Township	
43	Nettie Woods Covered Bridge	Nettie Woods Covered Bridge	June 22, 1979 (#79003818)	North of Oak Forest at the crossing of Pursley Creek; 39°51′47″N 80°14′04″W	Center Township	
44	W. A. Young and Sons Foundry and Machine Shop	W. A. Young and Sons Foundry and Machine Shop	December 23, 2016 (#100000839)	116 Water St. 39°56′59″N 79°59′57″W	Rices Landing	

== Former listings ==
	Name on the Register	Image	Date listed	Date removed	Location	City or town	Description
1	Neils Red Covered Bridge	Neils Red Covered Bridge	June 22, 1979 (#79003817)	March 22, 2018	East of Garards Fort at the crossing of Whiteley Creek; 39°48′43″N 80°00′50″W	Greene Township	Destroyed by arson in 1990.

== See also ==
- List of National Historic Landmarks in Pennsylvania
- National Register of Historic Places listings in Pennsylvania
- List of Pennsylvania state historical markers in Greene County
