= SGSD =

SGSD may refer to:

- Succinylglutamate-semialdehyde dehydrogenase, an enzyme in the oxidoreductase family
- Southeastern Greene School District, in Greene County, Pennsylvania
