= Greensboro Historic District =

Greensboro Historic District may refer to:

- Greensboro Historic District (Greensboro, Alabama)
- Greensboro Historic District (Greensboro, Pennsylvania)
