= Glassworks-Gabler House =

Historic house in Pennsylvania, United States

- U.S. National Register of Historic Places
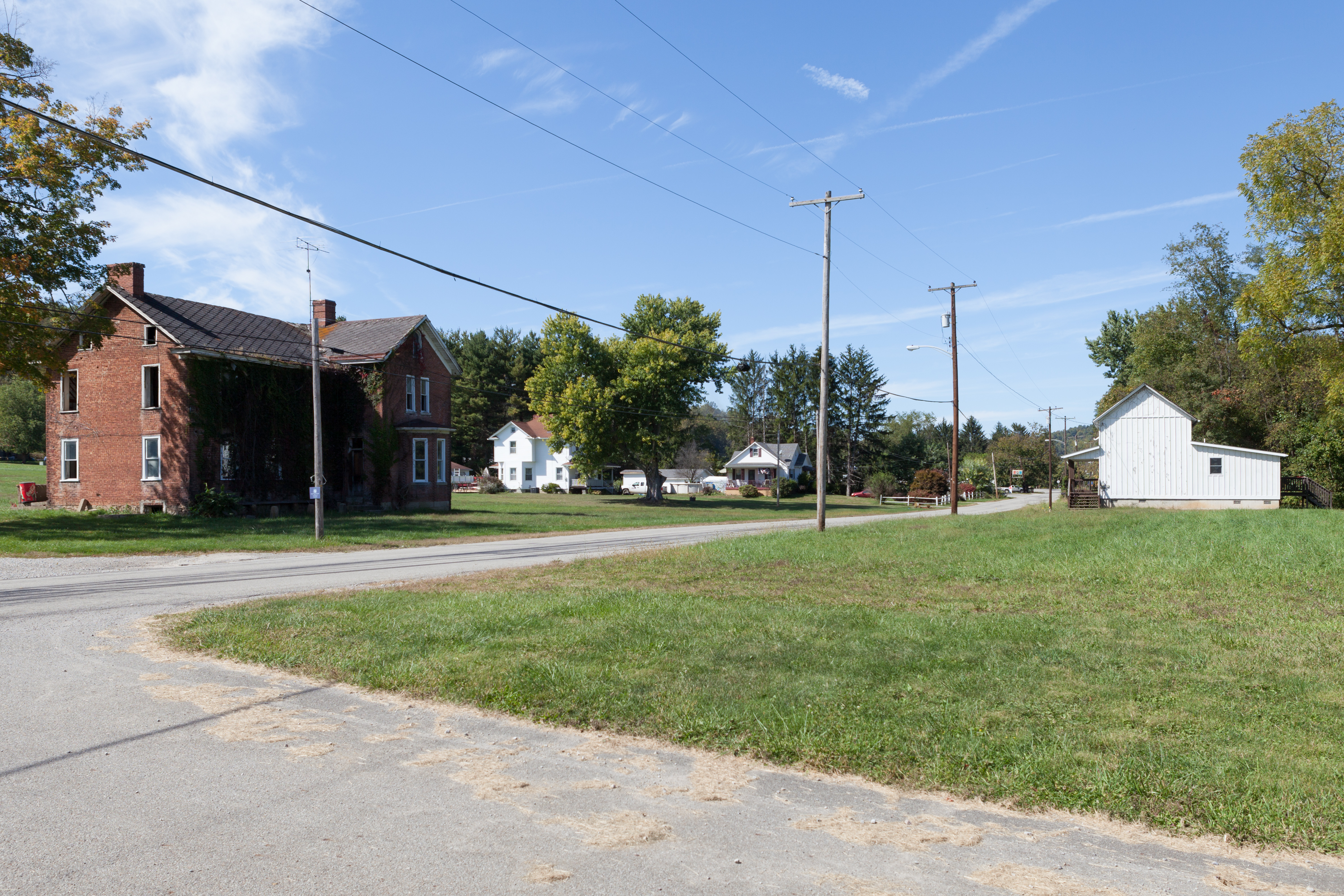
- Vacant lot where the house once stood. The Glassworks-Core House is on the right, the Reppert-Gabler House is across the street to the left.

- Location within Pennsylvania Location within the United States
- Location: PA 2014, in Glassworks, Monongahela Township, Pennsylvania
- Coordinates: 39°48′0″N 79°54′48″W
- Area: less than one acre
- Built: c. 1810
- Architectural style: Vernacular Georgian
- MPS: Greensboro--New Geneva MPS
- NRHP reference No.: 95000120
- Added to NRHP: July 27, 1995

The Glassworks-Gabler House, also known as Building 302A, is an historic home which is located in Monongahela Township in Greene County, Pennsylvania.

It was listed on the National Register of Historic Places in 1995.

== History and architectural features ==
Built circa 1810, the Glassworks-Gabler House is a two and-one-half-story, three-bay, vernacular, log dwelling, which sits on a rubblestone foundation. It has a rear kitchen addition that was erected during the twentieth century. The house was possibly built as part of the "New Geneva Glass Works Lot" for Albert Gallatin, an original investor in the New Geneva Glass Works.
