= Mapletown, Pennsylvania =

Unincorporated community in Pennsylvania, US

- Census-designated place
- Location within Pennsylvania Location within the United States
- Coordinates: 39°48′18″N 79°56′26″W
- Country: United States
- State: Pennsylvania
- County: Greene
- Township: Monongahela

Area
  - Total: 0.40 sq mi (1.03 km^{2})
  - Land: 0.40 sq mi (1.03 km^{2})
  - Water: 0 sq mi (0.00 km^{2})
- Elevation: 988 ft (301 m)

Population (2020)
  - Total: 125
  - Density: 314/sq mi (121.3/km^{2})
- Time zone: UTC-5 (Eastern (EST))
  - Summer (DST): UTC-4 (EDT)
- FIPS code: 42-47264
- GNIS feature ID: 2630022

Mapletown is an unincorporated community and census-designated place in Monongahela Township, Pennsylvania, United States. It is located 1 mile (1.6 km) west of the Monongahela River in southeastern Greene County. As of the 2010 census, the population was 130.

== Demographics ==
Historical population
Census	Pop.	Note	%±
2010	130		—
2020	125		−3.8%
U.S. Decennial Census

== Etymology ==
Mapletown is named for Robert "Bob" Mapel, who was also the founder of Bobtown, Pennsylvania.

== Education ==
Mapletown is served by Southeastern Greene School District and is the location of Mapletown Junior/Senior High School.
