= Mapletown Junior/Senior High School =

Coordinates: 39.80408°N 79.93804°W

Location
- 1000 Mapletown Road; Greensboro, Pennsylvania 15338

Information
- School district: Southeastern Greene
- NCES District ID: 4222200
- Superintendent: William R. Henderson III
- NCES School ID: 422220002284
- Principal: Bart Donley
- Faculty: 25.05 (FTE)
- Grades: 7-12
- Enrollment: 249 (2023–2024)
- Student to teacher ratio: 9.94
- Colors: Black & Gold
- Athletics conference: PIAA District VII (WPIAL)
- Nickname: Mapletown
- Team name: Maples
- Newspaper: The Maple
- Yearbook: Mon-O-Leaf
- Feeder schools: Bobtown Elementary School

Mapletown Junior/Senior High School is a public Junior/Senior High School, located near Greensboro, Pennsylvania (65 miles south of Pittsburgh) It is the sole secondary facility of the Southeastern Greene School District.

== Graduation Requirements ==
In order to graduate from Mapletown, students must successfully complete 27 credits of coursework, successfully score Proficient or above on the Pennsylvania System of School Assessments (PSSA) during grade 11 and complete a Graduation Project during their senior year.

=== Credit Coursework ===
There are two Credit Programs at Mapletown for students in Grades 10-12:

- College/Career Preparatory Program: Students take courses in order to meet minimum requirements for institutions of post-secondary learning.
- Career-Technical-Center: Students in this category attend the Greene County Career and Technology Center in Franklin Township, near Waynesburg for one-half of the school day in a particular program and attend Mapletown the other half of the day.

==== Credit Breakdown ====
Students must earn Credits in the following manner in order to graduate:

- Language Arts - 4 Credits
- Mathematics - 4 Credits
- Science - 4 Credits
- Social Studies - 3 Credits
- Arts and Humanities - 1 Credit
- Physical Education - 0.5 Credit
- Health - 0.5 Credit
- Electives - 10 Credits (CTC students must earn 1 Credit in Freshman Year)

== Athletics ==
Mapletown participates in Western Pennsylvania Interscholastic Athletic League, WPIAL for short, which is PIAA Disttict VII

Sport Name	Boys	Girls
Baseball	Class A	
Basketball	Class A	Class A
Football	Class A	
Softball		Class A
Volleyball		Class A

=== Junior High Athletics ===
Mapletown Junior High School participates in non-sanctioned athletics for students in grades 7 and 8:

- Basketball
- Football
