= Magnolia Hall (Greensboro, Alabama) =

Historic house in Alabama, United States

- U.S. National Register of Historic Places
- U.S. Historic district – Contributing property
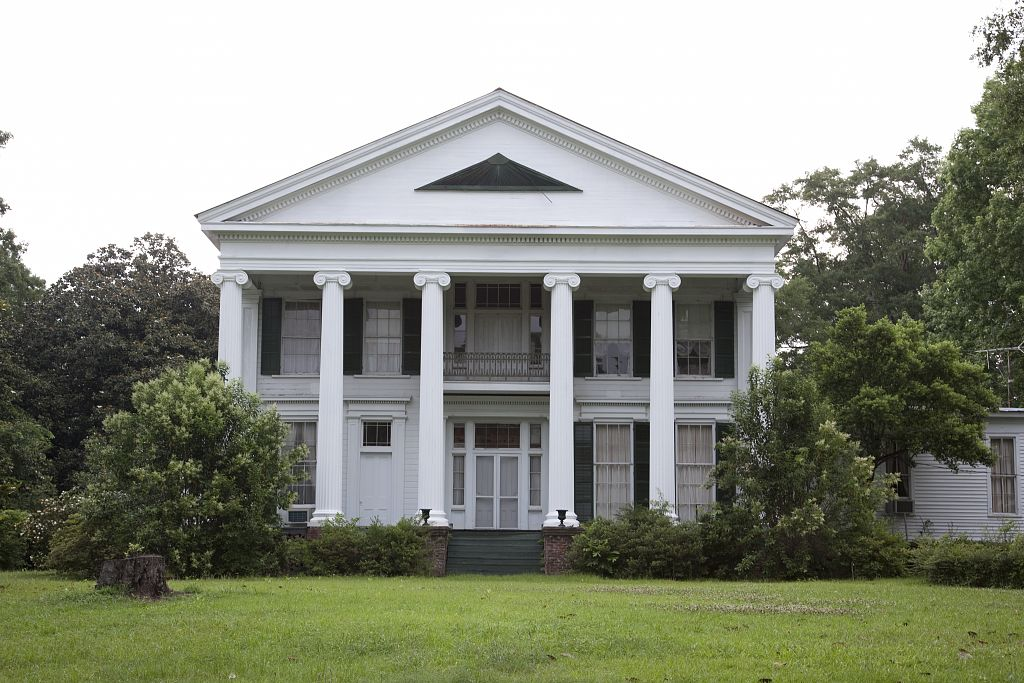
- Southern facade of Magnolia Hall, as viewed from Tutwiler Street. The service wing is visible on the eastern side (right) of the house.

- Location within Alabama Location within the United States
- Location: Corner of Otts and Tutwiler streets, Greensboro, Alabama
- Coordinates: 32°42′8″N 87°35′25″W
- Architectural style: Greek Revival
- Part of: Greensboro Historic District (Greensboro, Alabama) (ID76000328)
- NRHP reference No.: 100006665

Significant dates
- Added to NRHP: June 25, 2021
- Designated CP: August 13, 1976

Magnolia Hall, also known as the McCrary-Otts House, is a historic Greek Revival mansion in Greensboro, Alabama, United States. It is a contributing property to the Greensboro Historic District, listed on the National Register of Historic Places, and was individually listed on the National Register in 2021. It was recorded by the Historic American Buildings Survey in late March 1936.

== History ==
Greensboro became increasingly prosperous during the cotton boom of the mid-19th century. In 1850, William Murphy, a lawyer and legislator, sold a prime lot to David F. McCrary, a prominent cotton broker and planter who had originally come from North Carolina and married Elizabeth Cowan Lowry, daughter of a leading Alabama family. McCrary had Murphy's house moved and hired the well known architect B.F. Parsons, originally from Massachusetts, to design a mansion, which was completed in 1858. The Alabama Beacon reported that the house cost $10,000, a very large sum at the time.

Unlike many of his contemporaries, Mr. McCrary's finances survived the War; he opened the Greensboro Bank and Exchange in 1871. On his death in 1888, the McCrary's only living child, Lelia Jane, and her husband, the noted Presbyterian divine Dr. John M.P. Otts, inherited the property. Otts had given the first sermon to Confederate troops at Fort Sumter.

Their son James and his wife Sadie bought the house from his siblings in the 1920s. It remained in the McCrary-Otts family until 1970, when it was sold to Mr. and Mrs. M.D. Baines. The house was sold again in 2011.

== Architecture ==
A detailed, twelve-page building contract for Magnolia Hall was discovered by Dr. David Nelson, a McCrary descendant. Few such contracts describing the construction of antebellum mansions have survived. This one calls for porticoes, north and south, each with six fluted columns, of the "Grecian Ionic Order...the Entablature and Mouldings all to harmonize with it...and proportioned after the order."

In addition it calls for double balconies of delicate iron grill work, and colored glass transoms around the doors. Inside are large four-over-four rooms, 14-foot ceilings, chandelier medallions, and a grand, mahogany-railed staircase in the spacious hallway. W. E. Yerby, in his History of Greensboro, concluded that Magnolia Hall "is indisputably one of the finest antebellum mansions in Alabama...[and] a perfect example of late Greek Revival architecture."

Gallery
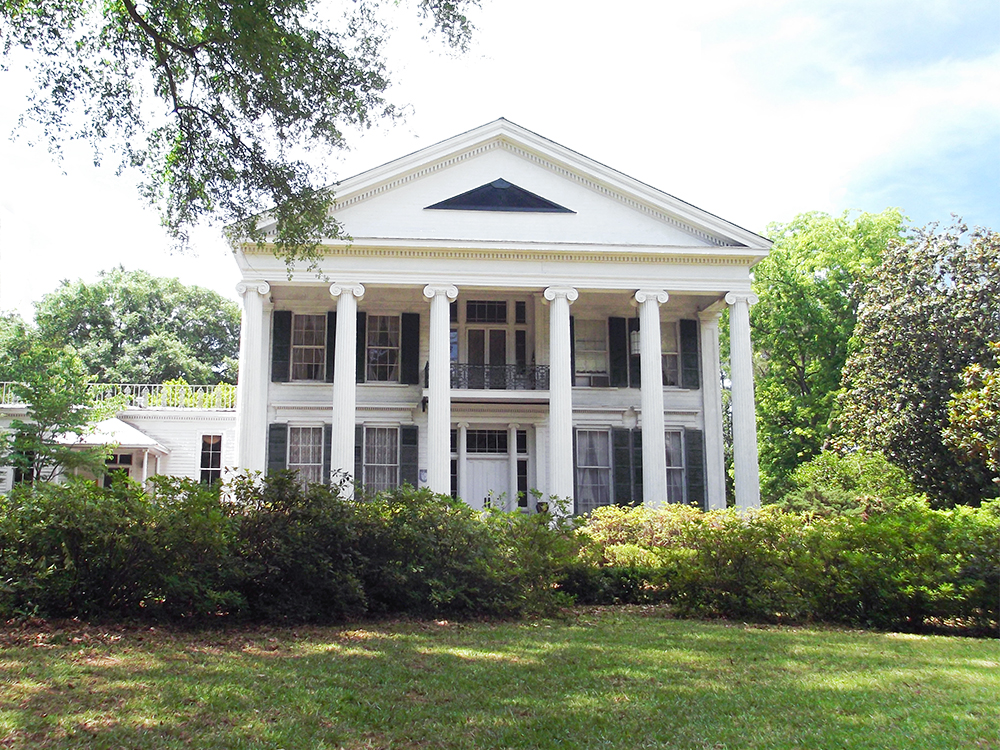
View of the northern facade of the house. Considered to be the "front" side of the house, it is almost a mirror image of the southern facade.

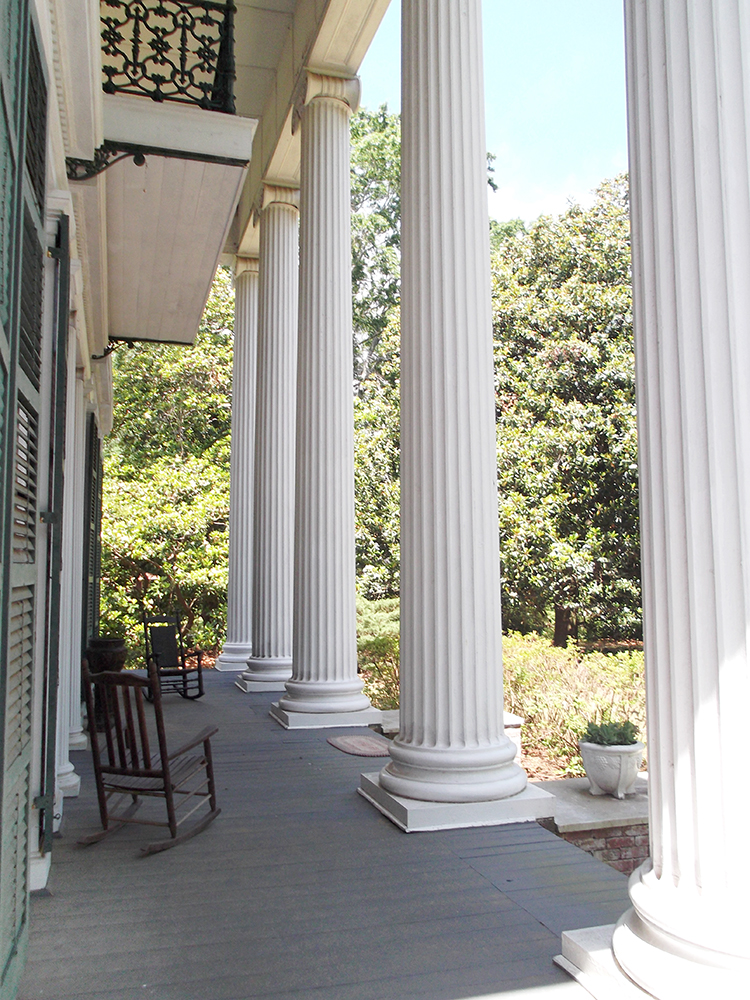
Detailed view of portico on northern facade.

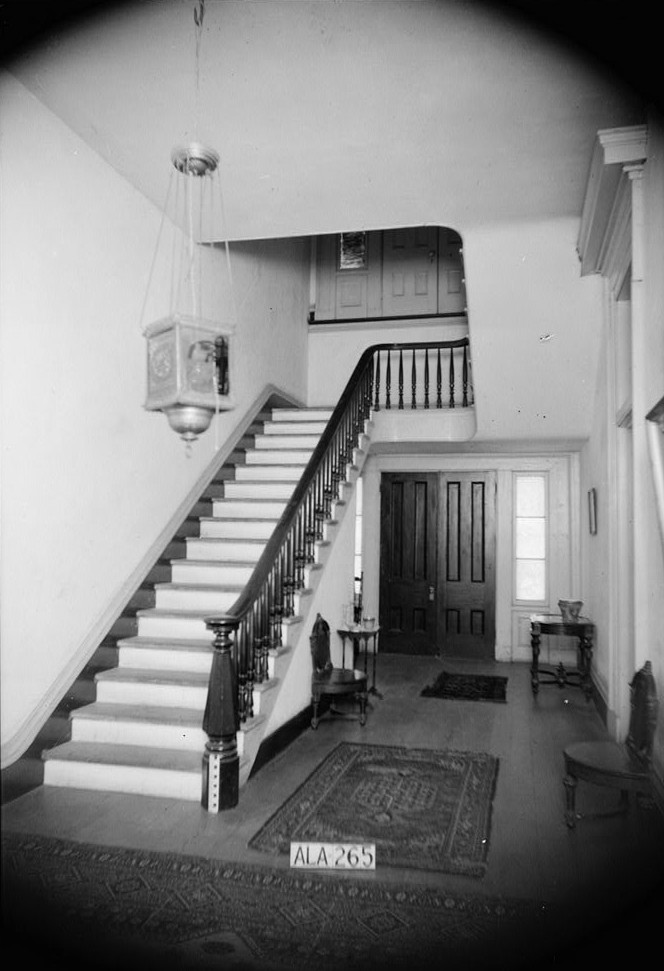
Historic American Buildings Survey photo of the first floor hallway with staircase, taken in 1936.

== See also ==
- Magnolia Grove (Greensboro, Alabama)
- National Register of Historic Places listings in Hale County, Alabama
