= John Minor Crawford House =

Historic house in Pennsylvania, United States

- U.S. National Register of Historic Places
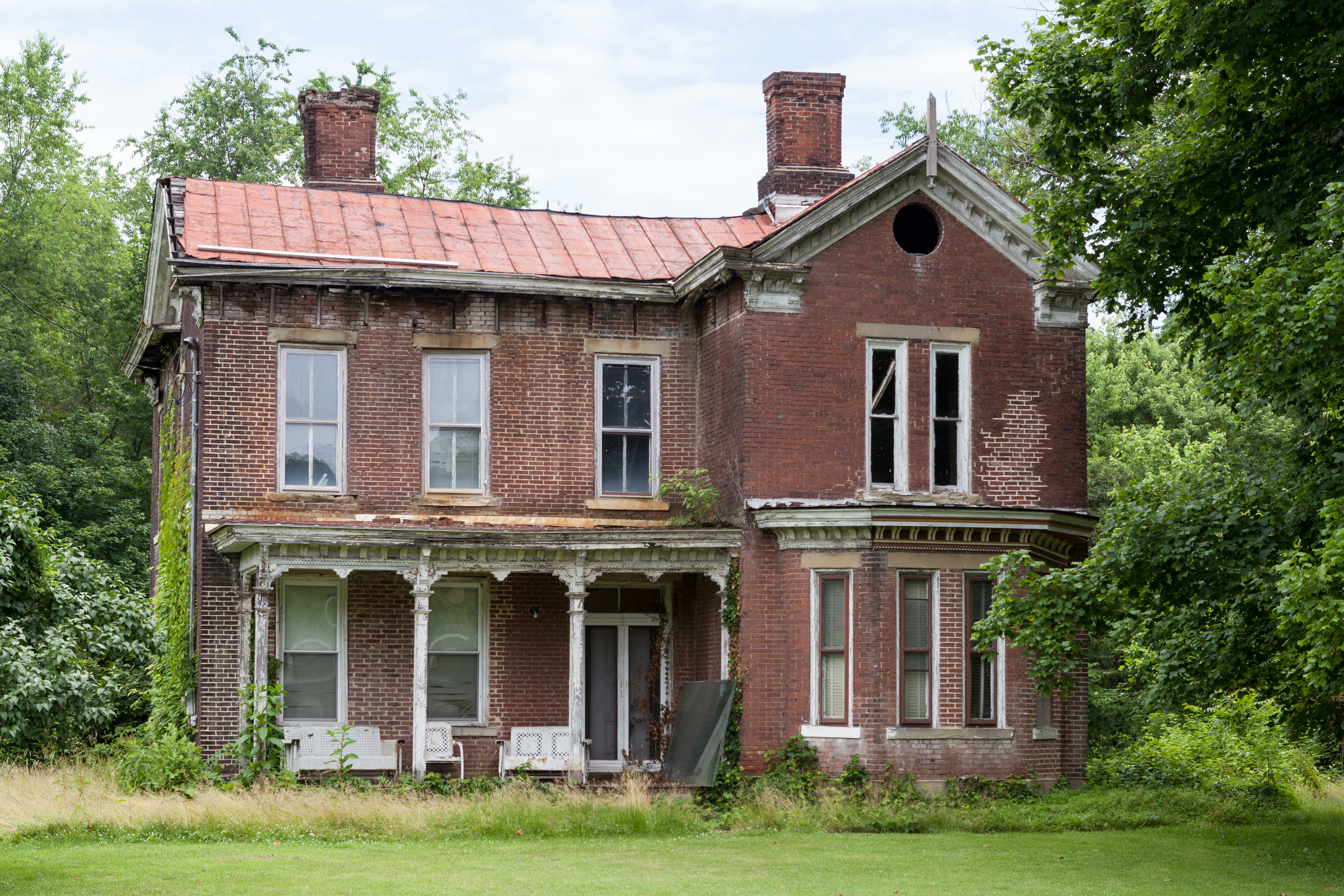
- Front of the house, June 2014

- Location within Pennsylvania Location within the United States
- Location: PA 2014 in Glassworks, Monongahela Township, Pennsylvania
- Coordinates: 39°48′4″N 79°54′50″W
- Area: less than one acre
- Built: c. 1878
- Architectural style: Italianate
- MPS: Greensboro--New Geneva MPS
- NRHP reference No.: 95000122
- Added to NRHP: July 27, 1995

The John Minor Crawford House, also known as Building 301, is an historic home that is located in Monongahela Township in Greene County, Pennsylvania, United States.

It was listed on the National Register of Historic Places in 1995.

== History and architectural features ==
Built circa 1878, this historic structure is a 2 1/2-story, four-bay, brick Italianate-style dwelling, and has a shallow pitched roof and tall, narrow windows. It was converted to a health center during the 1970s and was used as such until 1988. The house was possibly built as part of the "New Geneva Glass Works Lot."
