= West Greene School District =

School district in Pennsylvania

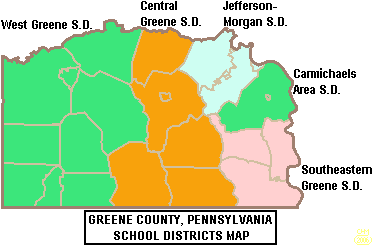

Address
- 1367 Hargus Creek Road Waynesburg, Greene County, Pennsylvania, 15370-8618; United States

District information
- Type: Public

Other information
- Website: www.wgsd.org

West Greene School District is a small, rural, public school district located in Greene County, Pennsylvania. The district serves a large rural region of approximately 256 square miles (660 km^{2}). It includes Morris Township, Center Township, Gray Township, Jackson Township, Gilmore Township, Freeport Township, Springhill Township, Aleppo Township, and Richhill Township. According to 2000 federal census data, it serves a resident population of 5,917. By 2010, the district's population declined to 5,102 people. In 2009, the district residents' per capita income was $14,228, while the median family income was $35,149 a year. The educational attainment levels for the population 25 and over were 83.7% high school graduates and 12.9% college graduates.

West Greene School District operates two schools: West Greene Elementary Center and West Greene Junior/Senior High School. West Greene High School students may attend Greene County Career and Technology Center. West Greene School District also operates an online academy in association with Intermediate Unit 1 which is open to students in grades 1 through 12. West Greene Online Academy high school students who complete all program requirements are awarded a West Greene High School diploma and may participate in the West Greene School District's Commencement Exercises. West Greene School District provides full-day kindergarten. West Greene students may attend a cyber academy provided by IU1.

== Extracurriculars ==
West Greene School District offers a wide variety of clubs, activities and sports.

=== Sports ===
The district funds:

Boys

- Baseball - A
- Basketball- AA
- Football - A
- Rifle - AAAA
- Track and Field - AA
- Wrestling - AA

Girls

- Basketball - A
- Softball - A
- Track and Field - AA
- Volleyball - A

Middle School Sports

Boys

- Basketball
- Football
- Wrestling

Girls

- Basketball
- Softball
- Volleyball

According to PIAA directory July 2012
