= Greene County Career and Technology Center =

Coordinates: 39.89603°N 80.14973°W

Location
- 60 Zimmerman Drive; Franklin Township, Greene County, Pennsylvania; Waynesburg, Pennsylvania

Information
- NCES School ID: 428024007068
- Faculty: 15
- Grades: 10-12
- Schedule type: Part-Time
- Communities served: Greene County, Pennsylvania

Greene County Career and Technology Center is a comprehensive career and technical school serving students from five school districts and their respective high schools in Greene County, Pennsylvania. The school is centrally located in the county, in Franklin Township, just east of Waynesburg.

== School districts and high schools ==
School district	High School
Carmichaels Area	Carmichaels Area Junior/Senior High School
Central Greene	Waynesburg Central High School
Jefferson-Morgan	Jefferson-Morgan Middle/Senior High School
Southeastern Greene	Mapletown Junior/Senior High School
West Greene	West Greene High School
