= James Parreco House =

Historic house in Pennsylvania, United States

- U.S. National Register of Historic Places
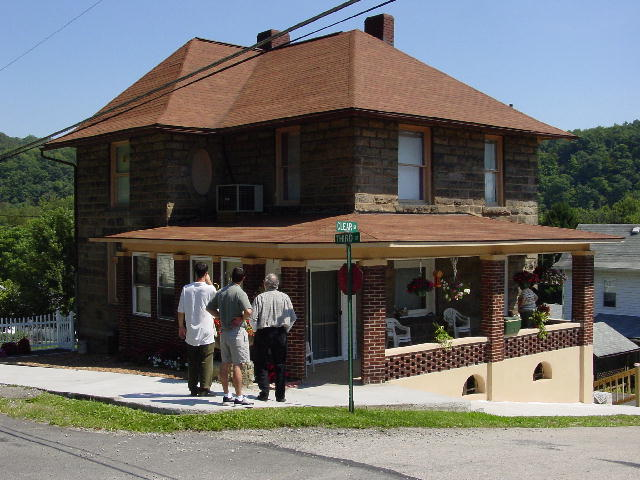
- James Parreco House, 2001

- Location within Pennsylvania Location within the United States
- Location: Jct. of Third and Clear Sts., Greensboro, Pennsylvania
- Coordinates: 39°47′38″N 79°54′48″W
- Area: less than one acre
- Built: c. 1910
- Built by: Parreco, James
- Architectural style: Late 19th And Early 20th Century American Movements
- MPS: Greensboro--New Geneva MPS
- NRHP reference No.: 95000115
- Added to NRHP: March 9, 1995

The James Parreco House is a historic home located at Greensboro in Greene County, Pennsylvania. It was built about 1910, and is a 2 1/2-story, two bay sandstone dwelling, with Prairie Style design elements. It has a hipped roof with wide waves and a one-story front porch with massive brick supports.

It was listed on the National Register of Historic Places in 1995.

== See also ==
- National Register of Historic Places listings in Greene County, Pennsylvania
