= John Bristor =

American football player (born 1955)

No. 29
- Position: Cornerback

Personal information
- Born: November 25, 1955 (age 70); Waynesburg, Pennsylvania, U.S.
- Listed height: 5 ft 11 in (1.80 m)
- Listed weight: 184 lb (83 kg)

Career information
- High school: West Greene
- College: Waynesburg
- NFL draft: 1978: undrafted

Career history
- Miami Dolphins (1978)*; San Francisco 49ers (1979); Green Bay Packers (1980)*
- * Offseason or practice squad member only
- Stats at Pro Football Reference

John Rollins Bristor (born November 25, 1955) is an American former professional football player who was a cornerback for the San Francisco 49ers of the National Football League (NFL). He played college football for the Waynesburg Yellow Jackets.
