= Southeastern Greene School District =

School district in Pennsylvania

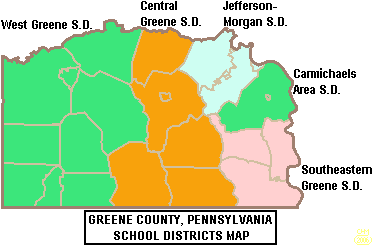

Address
- 1000 Mapletown Road Greensboro, Greene County, Pennsylvania, 15338-9801; United States

District information
- Type: Public

Other information
- Website: www.segsd.org

Southeastern Greene School District is a diminutive, rural, public school district located in Greene County, Pennsylvania. It serves the borough of Greensboro, Monongahela Township, Dunkard Township, and Greene Township. Upper-level students attend the district's Mapletown Junior/Senior High School. The SGSD encompasses approximately 68 square miles (180 km^{2}). According to 2000 federal census data, it served a resident population of 4,812. By 2010, the district's population declined to 4,643 people. In 2009, Southeastern Greene School District residents' per capita income was $15,785, while the median family income was $33,005. In the Commonwealth, the median family income was $49,501 and the United States median family income was $49,445, in 2010. The educational attainment levels for the population 25 and over were 83.6% high school graduates and 11.4% college graduates.

Southeastern Greene School District operates two schools: Bobtown Elementary school and Mapletown Junior Senior High School. High school students may choose to attend Greene County Career and Technology Center for training in the construction and mechanical trades. The Intermediate Unit IU1 provides the district with a wide variety of services like specialized education for disabled students and hearing, speech and visual disability services and professional development for staff and faculty.

== Extracurriculars ==
Southeastern Greene School District offers a variety of clubs, activities and sports. The district's interscholastic sports program consists of eight varsity teams, two junior varsity teams and six junior high/middle school programs. All of these groups compete in the Pennsylvania Interscholastic Athletic Association (P.I.A.A.) District 7, commonly known as the Western Pennsylvania Interscholastic Athletic League (W.P.I.A.L.).

=== Sports ===
The district funds:

Boys

- Baseball - A
- Basketball - A
- Football - A
- Wrestling - AA

Girls

- Basketball - A
- Softball - A
- Volleyball
