= Carmichaels Area Junior/Senior High School =

Coordinates: 39.89669°N 79.97862°W

Location
- 300 West Greene Street; Carmichaels, Pennsylvania 15320

Information
- School type: Public Junior/Senior High School
- School district: Carmichaels Area
- NCES District ID: 4205070
- Superintendent: Amy L. Todd
- NCES School ID: 420507007126
- Principal: Lisa Zdravecky
- Faculty: 39
- Enrollment: 283 (2023-2024)
- Student to teacher ratio: 10.1:1
- Colors: Blue, Gold, and White
- Slogan: "Once A Mike, Always a Mike"
- Athletics conference: PIAA District VII / WPIAL
- Mascot: Lightning Bolt
- Team name: Mikes
- Communities served: Carmichaels
- Feeder schools: Carmichaels Area Elementary Center

Carmichaels Area Junior/Senior High School is a public Junior/Senior High School, serving around 400 students in grades 6-12, and is located about 60 miles south of Pittsburgh in east-central Greene County.

== Graduation Requirements ==
The Carmichaels Area School District requires students to attain a minimum of 25 Planned Courses through successful completion of coursework.

- English - 4 Planned Courses
- Math - 4 Planned Courses
- Science - 4 Planned Courses
- History - 4 Planned Courses
- Phys. Ed. - 1 Planned Course
- Electives - 8 Courses

=== Career Paths ===
Students at Carmichaels have the option in grades 10-12 to choose one of two career paths:

- Academic - Students plan to further their education after High School by completing the required coursework for institutions of higher learning.
- Tech-Prep - Students spend one half of the school day at Carmichaels and the other half at the Greene County Career and Technology Center in Franklin Township, near Waynesburg.

== Athletics ==
Carm Area participates in the Western Pennsylvania Interscholastic Athletic League, or WPIAL, which is PIAA District 7.

- Baseball - Class AA
- Basketball - Class AA
- Football - Class A
- Golf - Class AAAA
- Softball - Class A
- Volleyball - Class AA
- Cross Country - Class A

=== Junior High Athletics ===
Seventh and Eighth graders participate in the following non-classified sports:

- Basketball
- Football
- Softball
- Volleyball
