= West Greene High School (Pennsylvania) =

Coordinates: 39.85353°N 80.28047°W

Location
- 1352 Hargus Creek Road; Center Township, Greene County, Pennsylvania; Waynesburg, Pennsylvania 15370

Information
- Type: Public High School
- School district: West Greene
- NCES District ID: 4225440
- Superintendent: Brian Jackson
- NCES School ID: 422544007165
- Secondary Principal: Scott G. Sakai
- Faculty: 22
- Grades: 9-12
- Enrollment: 204 (2015-16)
- Student to teacher ratio: 13.3:1
- Colors: Royal Blue and Gold
- Song: West Greene Alma Mater
- Fight song: Notre Dame Victory March
- Athletics conference: PIAA District VII (WPIAL)
- Sports: football. softball. baseball. Cross country. Wrestling. Volleyball. Cheerleading.
- Nickname: Pioneer
- Team name: Pioneers
- Rival: Waynesburg Central High School
- Newspaper: The Informer
- Yearbook: Pioneer
- Feeder schools: West Greene Middle School

West Greene High School is a public High School located six miles west of Waynesburg, the county seat of Greene County, Pennsylvania. There are about 300 students in grades 9-12. The school building is attached to the school's sole feeder, West Greene Middle School.

== Vocational education ==
Students in grades 10–12 have the opportunity to attend the Greene County Career and Technology Center, located in Franklin Township part-time while attending their home school, in learning a certain trade.

== Athletics ==
West Greene is a member of both the Pennsylvania Interscholastic Athletic Association and the Western Pennsylvania Interscholastic Athletic League (PIAA District VII)

Sport Name	Boys	Girls
Baseball	Class A	
Basketball	Class A	Class A
Football	Class A	
Rifle	Class AAAA	
Softball		Class A
Track and Field	Class AA	Class AA
Volleyball		Class A
Wrestling	Class AA	

== Notable alumni ==
- John Bristor, former NFL player
