= Carmichaels Area School District =

School district in Pennsylvania

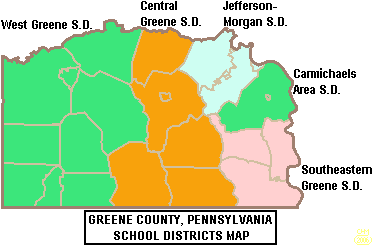

Address
- 300 West Greene Street Carmichaels, Greene County, Pennsylvania, 15320-1287; United States

District information
- Type: Public

Students and staff
- District mascot: The Mighty Mikes

Other information
- Website: www.carmarea.org

The Carmichaels Area School District serves the Borough of Carmichaels and Cumberland Township in Greene County, Pennsylvania. The district encompasses approximately 39 square miles (100 km^{2}). The district is one of the 500 public school districts of Pennsylvania and one of five public school districts in Greene County. According to 2000 federal census data, it served a resident population of 7,120. By 2010, the district's population declined to 7,098 people. In 2009, the district residents’ per capita income was $15,269, while the median family income was $36,276. In the Commonwealth, the median family income was $49,501 and the United States median family income was $49,445, in 2010. The educational attainment levels for the population 25 and over were 86.0% high school graduates and 18.6% college graduates.

Carmichaels Area School District operates one elementary school (Carmichaels Area Elementary Center), and one Junior/Senior High School, Carmichaels Area Junior/Senior High School. High school students may choose to attend Greene County Career and Technology Center for training in the construction and mechanical trades. The Intermediate Unit IU1 provides the district with a wide variety of services like specialized education for disabled students and hearing, speech and visual disability services and professional development for staff and faculty.

== Extracurriculars ==
Carmichaels Area School District offers a variety of clubs, activities and an extensive interscholastic sports program.

=== High school sports ===
Carmichaels Area High School is a member of the Pennsylvania Interscholastic Athletic Association (PIAA) and the Western Pennsylvania Interscholastic Athletic League (WPIAL). Carmichaels is in PIAA District 7.

Sport name	Boys	Girls
Football	Class A	N/A
Basketball	Class A	Class A
Baseball/softball	Class A	Class A
Golf	Class AA	N/A
Volleyball	N/A	Class A

Junior high school

Boys:

- Basketball
- Football

Girls

- Basketball
- Softball
- Volleyball

According to PIAA directory July 2012
