= Carmichaels Covered Bridge =

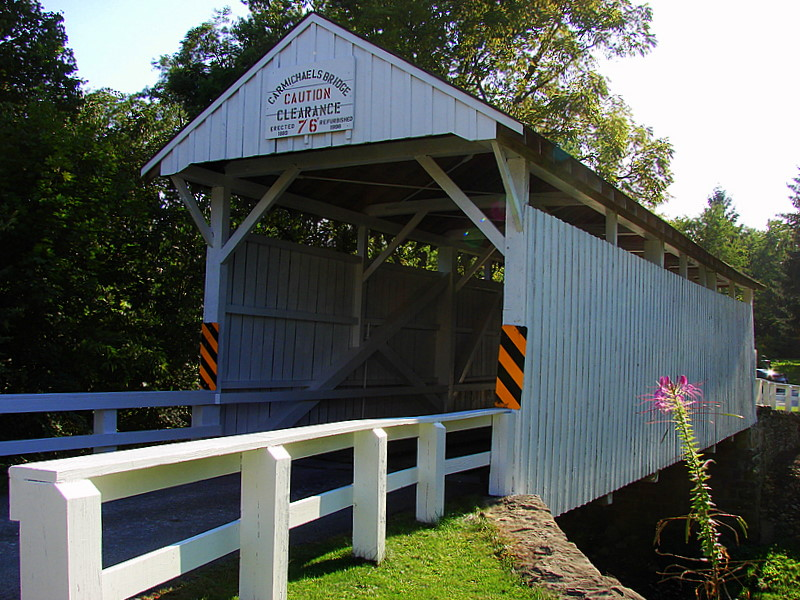
- Coordinates: 39°53′55″N 79°58′38″W
- Carries: Old Town Road
- Crosses: Muddy Creek
- Locale: Greene, Pennsylvania, United States
- Official name: Greene County Bridge #11
- Maintained by: Greene County
- NBI #: 307401901520110

Characteristics
- Total length: 64 ft (20 m)
- Width: 15 ft (4.6 m)

History
- Built: 1889
- Carmichaels Covered Bridge
- U.S. National Register of Historic Places
- MPS: Covered Bridges in Washington and Greene Counties TR
- NRHP reference No.: 79003815
- Added to NRHP: June 22, 1979

Location
- Interactive map of Carmichaels Covered Bridge

The Carmichaels Covered Bridge is a historic wooden covered bridge located at Carmichaels in Greene County, Pennsylvania. It is a 64-foot-long (20 m), Queenpost truss bridge with a raised seam tin covered gable roof, constructed in 1889. It crosses Muddy Creek. As of October 1978, it was one of nine historic covered bridges in Greene County.

It was listed on the National Register of Historic Places in 1979.

== See also ==
- List of bridges on the National Register of Historic Places in Pennsylvania
- National Register of Historic Places listings in Greene County, Pennsylvania
