= Sugar Grove Petroglyphs =

- Sugar Grove Petroglyph Site (36GR5)
- U.S. National Register of Historic Places
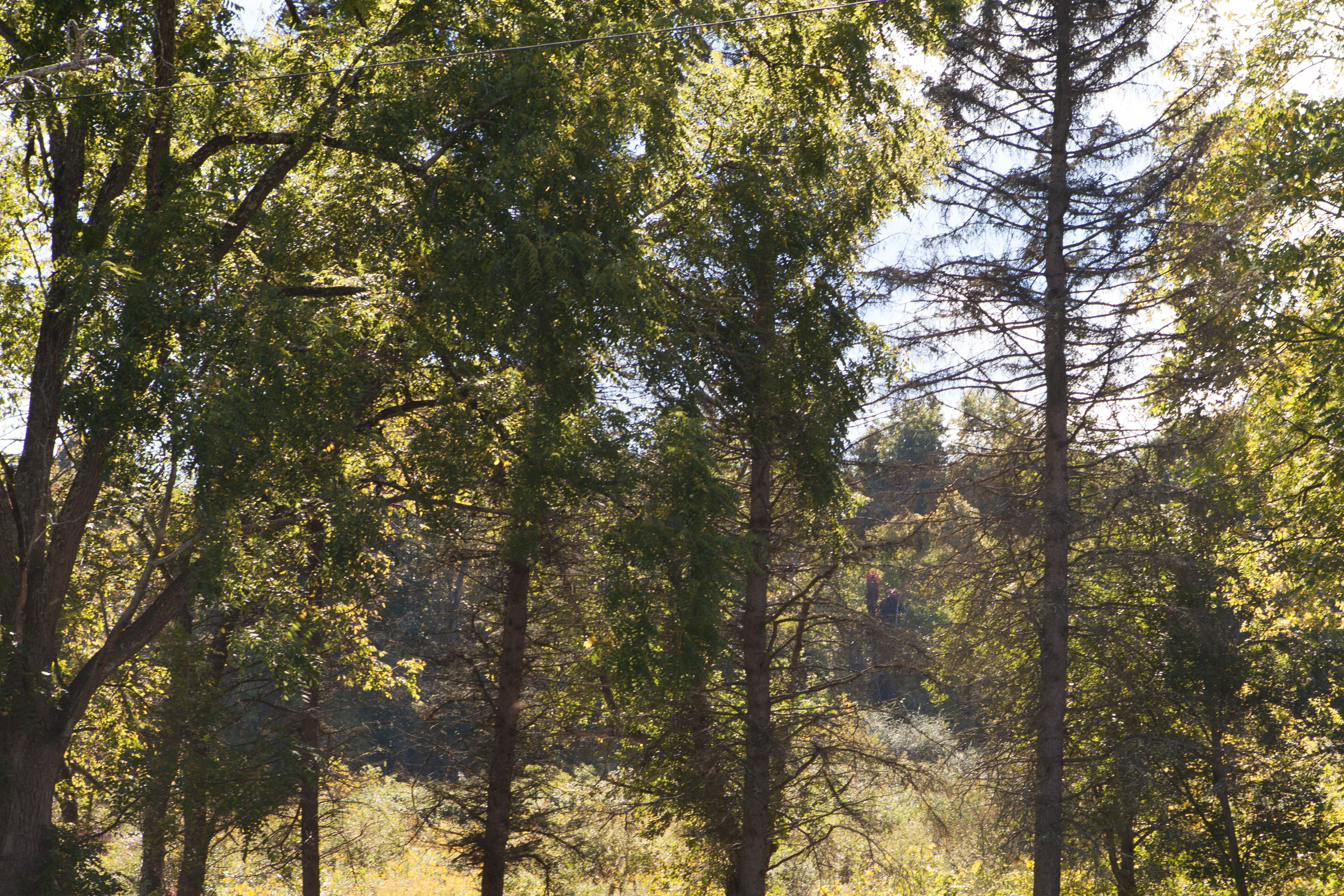
- Heavily wooded and on private land, this is a largely obscured view of the area of the site

- Location within Pennsylvania Location within the United States
- Location: Off Pennsylvania Route 88, 0.7 miles (1.1 km) south of its bridge over Whiteley Creek in Monongahela Township
- Nearest city: Masontown, Pennsylvania
- Coordinates: 39°49′36″N 79°57′40″W
- Area: 0.1 acres (0.040 ha)
- NRHP reference No.: 86000476
- Added to NRHP: March 20, 1986

The Sugar Grove Petroglyphs are a group of petroglyphs in the southwestern part of the U.S. state of Pennsylvania. Located on an outcrop of sandstone in Monongahela Township near the eastern edge of Greene County, the petroglyphs have been known since at least the 1930s. Due to their value as an archaeological site, the petroglyphs have been named a historic site.

== Creation ==
It is certain that the Sugar Grove Petroglyphs are the work of a Native American people, although the cultural affiliation of their creators is unknown. Among the cultures that archaeologists have seen as possible creators are the Monongahela or Fort Ancient, both of which are known to have inhabited the upper portions of the Ohio River valley. In his 1974 monograph Rock Art of the Upper Ohio Valley, petroglyph specialist James L. Swauger argued for a Monongahela-related and proto-Shawnee identity of the creators; this conclusion he drew from the presence of carvings that he interpreted as representations of Ojibwe religious subjects. Although the Ojibwe never inhabited southwestern Pennsylvania, Swauger believed that the ancestors of the Shawnee shared these subjects as part of a common cultural heritage.

== Geology ==
The petroglyphs were carved into the flat portion of a large outcrop of Dunkard-series sandstone; it rises somewhat more than 4 feet (1.2 m) above the ground on its western side, but its other edges are level with the floor of the surrounding woodland. The petroglyphs are confined to a roughly square area of the stone that measures approximately 23 feet (7.0 m) on each side, although most appear on the eastern side and center of this area.

== Carvings ==
Forty-eight different carvings are present on the sandstone; although most are Native American artwork, a few have been added by vandals since European settlement of southwestern Pennsylvania. Swauger grouped the designs into six categories, as follows:

Category	Number of carvings
Abstract designs	23
Birds and footprints	10
Complete and partial human figures	8
Animals and footprints	4
Arrows	2
Nut-cracking holes	1

Identification of the various designs has been complicated by erosion; some designs, especially those that are clustered closely together, have deteriorated and are thus difficult to classify conclusively. Among the most difficult are the carvings that were identified as bird tracks; they may have originally been abstract designs or arrowheads. Likewise, many abstract designs may have been created as identifiable designs, with their present conditions being the result of vandalism, later Native American carvings, or erosion. The most distinctive image on the rock is a large, almost circular animal that appears to be swallowing its tail; due to its unique shape and great size [its diameter is approximately 5 feet (1.5 m)], it has been seen as the most important single petroglyph at the site. It has been claimed that the site was damaged by quarrying circa 1950, but the only damage visible in a 1960 survey was small bits of stone that had been chipped away, possibly by vandals attempting to remove individual carvings. A 1982 survey discovered that the site had not changed since the 1960 survey.

== Recognition ==
Locals have long known the petroglyphs as the "Picture Rocks;" its original scholarly recognition was under this name, producing confusion in archaeological records after the site was separately recorded under the name of "Sugar Grove Petroglyphs." The first appearance of the Sugar Grove Petroglyphs in scholarly literature was no later than 1931, when they were given a short appearance in an archaeological survey of adjacent Fayette County. More detailed surveys in 1934 and 1950 led respectively to the publication of detailed drawings of the designs and to formal recognition as an archaeological site.

Finding preservation of the designs to be a priority, the Carnegie Museum of Natural History arranged for the production of plaster casts of the designs during the twentieth century. Sugar Grove has been seen as one of western Pennsylvania's most important petroglyph sites: although it is smaller than many others, its location has spared it from the fate of many waterside petroglyphs that have been submerged by the construction of major dams, and it has suffered less vandalism than many other sites that occupy dry ground.

In recognition of their archaeological value, the Sugar Grove Petroglyphs were listed on the National Register of Historic Places in 1986. They are one of four petroglyph sites in Pennsylvania to have received this designation, along with the Indian God Rock in Venango County, the Francis Farm Petroglyphs in Fayette County, and the Big and Little Indian Rock Petroglyphs in Lancaster County.
