= Alexander V. Boughner House =

Historic house in Pennsylvania, United States

- U.S. National Register of Historic Places
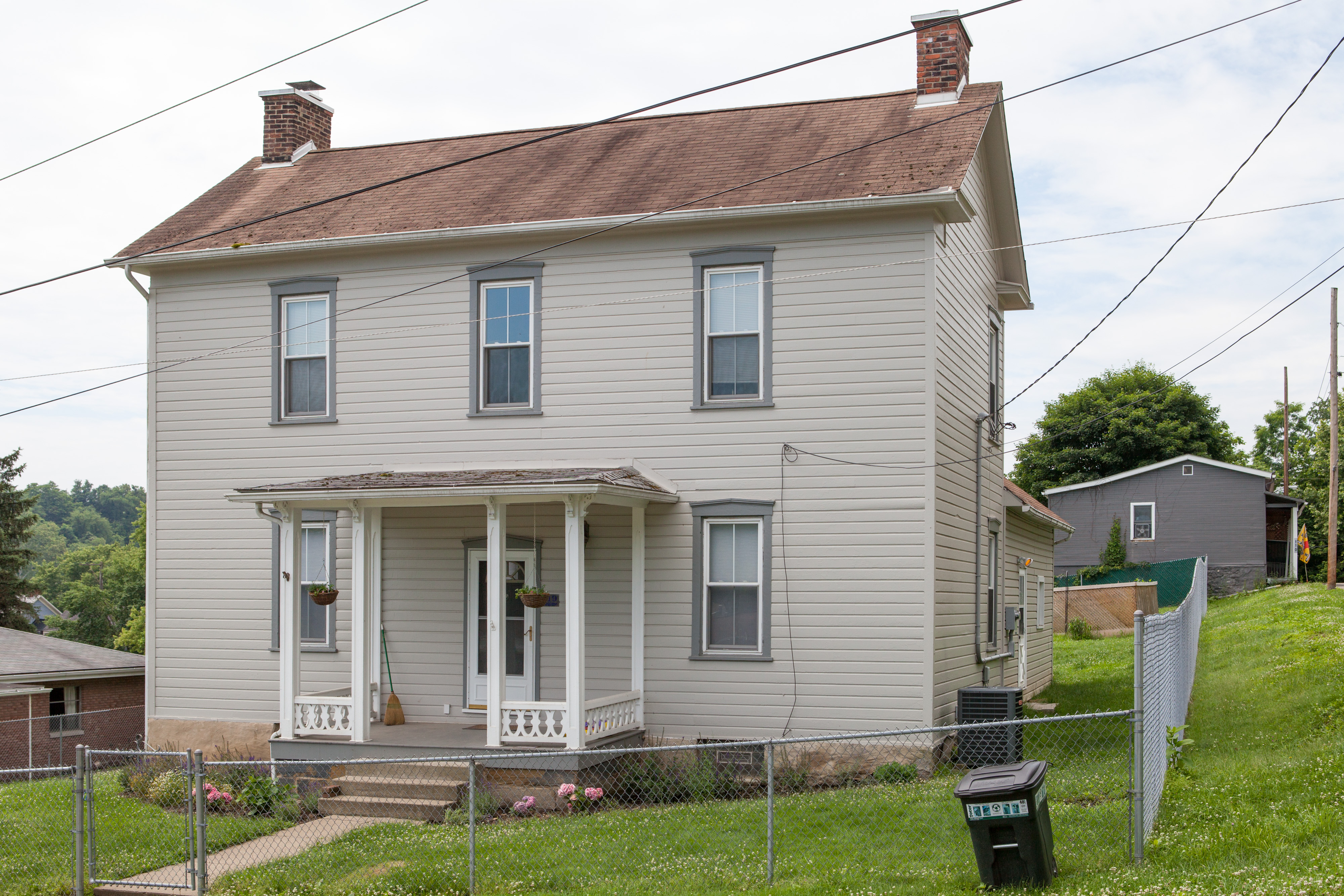
- The front of house in June, 2014

- Location within Pennsylvania Location within the United States
- Location: Jct. of Second and Minor Sts., Greensboro, Pennsylvania
- Coordinates: 39°47′30.5″N 79°54′50″W
- Area: less than one acre
- Built: c. 1857
- Architectural style: Greek Revival
- MPS: Greensboro--New Geneva MPS
- NRHP reference No.: 95000114
- Added to NRHP: March 9, 1995

Alexander V. Boughner House is a historic home located at Greensboro in Greene County, Pennsylvania. It was built about 1857, and is a 2 1/2-story, three-bay, "I"-plan dwelling in the Greek Revival style. It has a rear kitchen ell. The front facade features a small entry porch with a hipped roof supported by four square columns.

Alexander V. Boughner, born in 1830, was a third generation potter. The 1850s and 1860s were a prosperous time in the Greensboro area partially due to an 1856 extension of the slack water system of locks and dams on the Monongahela River allowing easier travel to and from Pittsburgh. Boughner participated in the general prosperity brought to the area by the stoneware industry, he remained active during the peak years in the 1870s and 1880s. He also branched out into a successful mercantile business. As was typical for the Greensboro area in that time, owner/managers lived on the same level as local artisans and workers; Boughner's home was a modest, yet substantial one.

The house was listed on the National Register of Historic Places in 1995.
