= Greensboro Public School =

- U.S. National Register of Historic Places
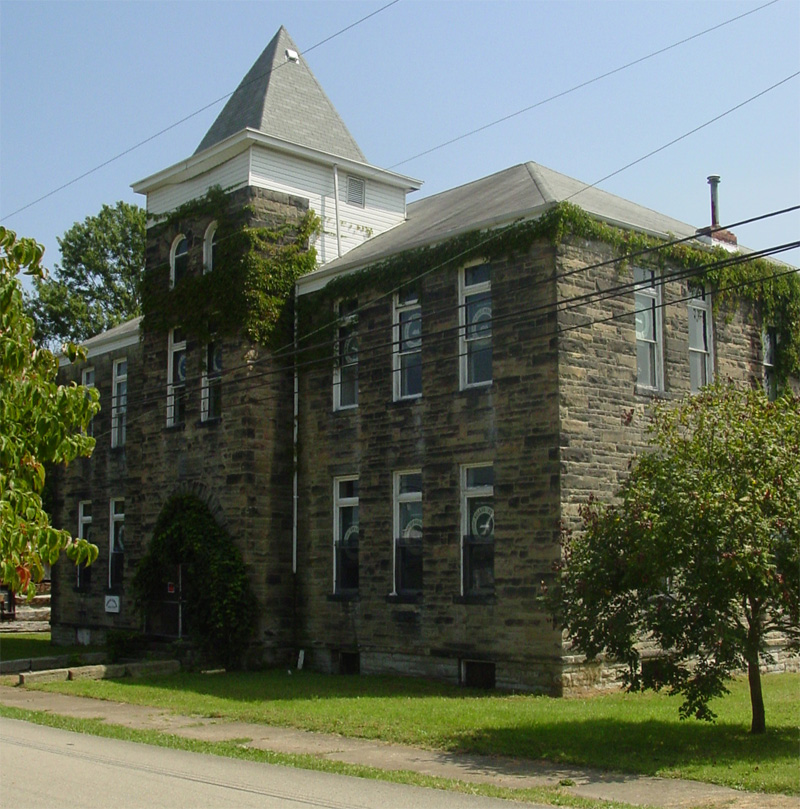

- Location within Pennsylvania
- Location: Second and Clear Sts., Greensboro, Pennsylvania
- Coordinates: 39°47′37″N 79°54′44″W
- Built: 1904
- Architect: James Parreco
- Architectural style: Romanesque
- MPS: Greensboro—New Geneva MPS
- NRHP reference No.: 95000113
- Added to NRHP: March 9, 1995

The Greensboro Public School is an historic school building which is located in Greensboro in Greene County, Pennsylvania.

It was added to National Register of Historic Places on March 9, 1995.

== History and architectural features ==
This two-and-one-half-story, seven-bay school was built in 1904 by James Parreco in the Richardsonian Romanesque style. Students in grades one through eight attended the school until roughly 1960, when the building was donated by the school district to the town. By 1976, the building was turned over to the MONON Center to be used as a local history museum and community center that focused on regional craft and art. A log cabin the Baltzer Kramer House was moved to the property sometime around 1976, but is not included in the historical site.
