= Colver-Rogers Farmstead =

Historic house in Pennsylvania, United States

- U.S. National Register of Historic Places
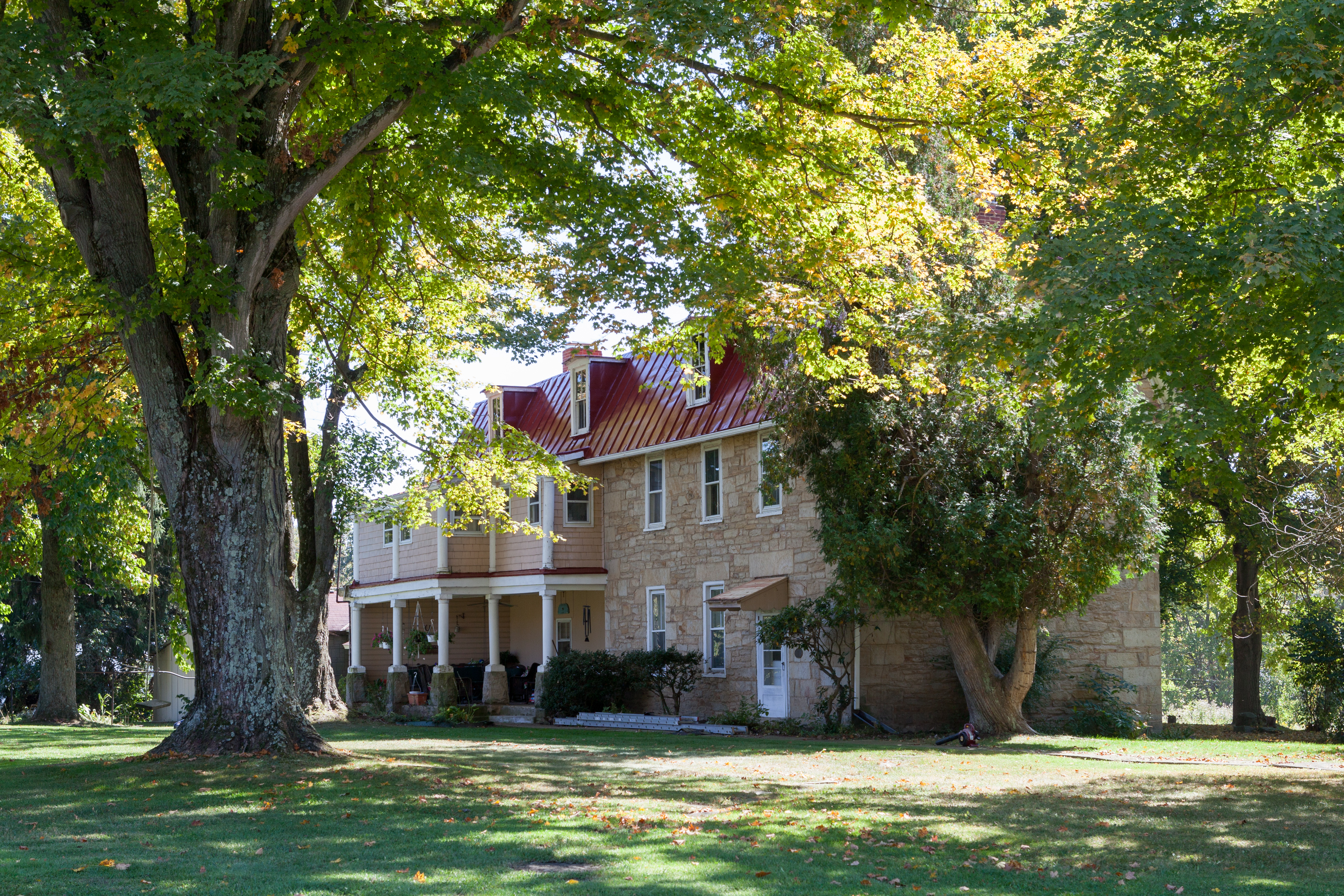
- The farm building in September 2014

- Location within Pennsylvania Location within the United States
- Location: East of State Route 1011 at Township 159, north of Jefferson, Morgan Township, Pennsylvania
- Coordinates: 39°56′29″N 80°03′41″W
- Area: 11 acres (4.5 ha)
- Built: 1830, c. 1906
- Architectural style: Greek Revival, Colonial Revival
- NRHP reference No.: 03001191
- Added to NRHP: November 21, 2003

Colver-Rogers Farmstead, also known as the Norval P. Rogers building, is a historic building located at Morgan Township in Greene County, Pennsylvania. The original section was built in 1830, and is a two-story, stone dwelling, with a two-story stone wing, in a vernacular Greek Revival-style. The building was modified about 1906, with the addition of a gambrel roof and rambling porch with Colonial Revival-style design elements. Also on the property is a bank barn (c. 1880) and large wash house (c. 1906).

It was listed on the National Register of Historic Places in 2003.
