= Greensboro Historic District (Greensboro, Alabama) =

Historic district in Alabama, United States

- U.S. National Register of Historic Places
- U.S. Historic district
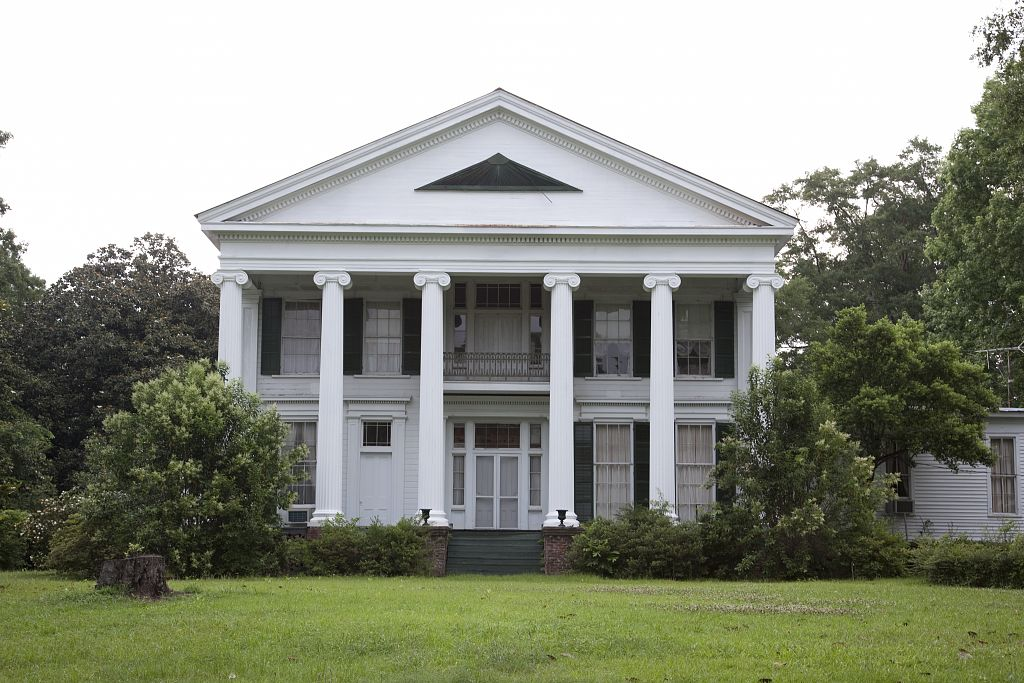
- Magnolia Hall (1855)

- Location within Alabama Location within the United States
- Location: Main Street between Hobson and 1st Greensboro, Alabama
- Coordinates: 32°42′14″N 87°36′5″W
- NRHP reference No.: 76000328
- Added to NRHP: August 13, 1976

The Greensboro Historic District is a historic district in the city of Greensboro, Alabama, United States. Greensboro was incorporated as a town in December 1823 as Greensborough. The community was known as Troy prior to that time. The historic district is centered on Main Street and runs from Hobson Street on the western side of the city to 1st Street on the eastern side. It features examples of Federal, Greek Revival, and regional vernacular architecture. One significant contributing property is Magnolia Hall. It was placed on the National Register of Historic Places on August 13, 1976.
