= Glassworks-Core House =

Historic house in Pennsylvania, United States

- U.S. National Register of Historic Places
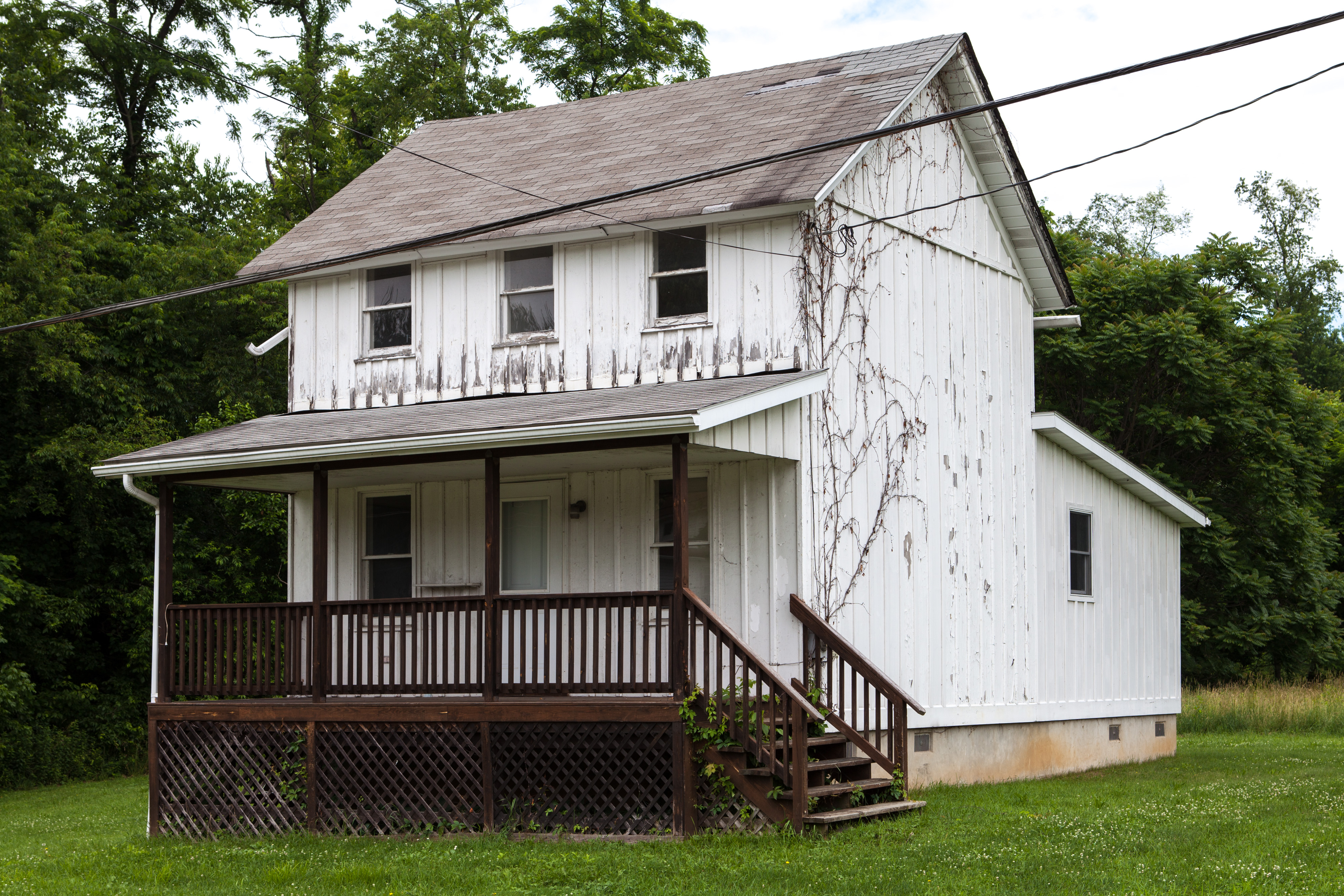
- Front and south side, June 2014

- Location within Pennsylvania Location within the United States
- Location: PA 2014 in Glassworks, Monongahela Township, Pennsylvania
- Coordinates: 39°48′0″N 79°54′48″W
- Area: less than one acre
- Built: c. 1820
- Architectural style: Vernacular I-House
- MPS: Greensboro--New Geneva MPS
- NRHP reference No.: 95000121
- Added to NRHP: July 27, 1995

The Glassworks-Core House, also known as the Reppert/Kramer House and Building 302B, is an historic home which is located in Monongahela Township in Greene County, Pennsylvania.

It was listed on the National Register of Historic Places in 1995.

== History and architectural features ==
Built circa 1820, the Glassworks-Core House is a two-and-one-half-story, three-bay, vernacular, timber-frame dwelling. It has an "I"-plan, rear kitchen addition, and a shed roofed porch that was added during the twentieth century. The house was possibly built as part of the "New Geneva Glass Works Lot."
