= Greene Academy =

- U.S. National Register of Historic Places
- Pennsylvania state historical marker
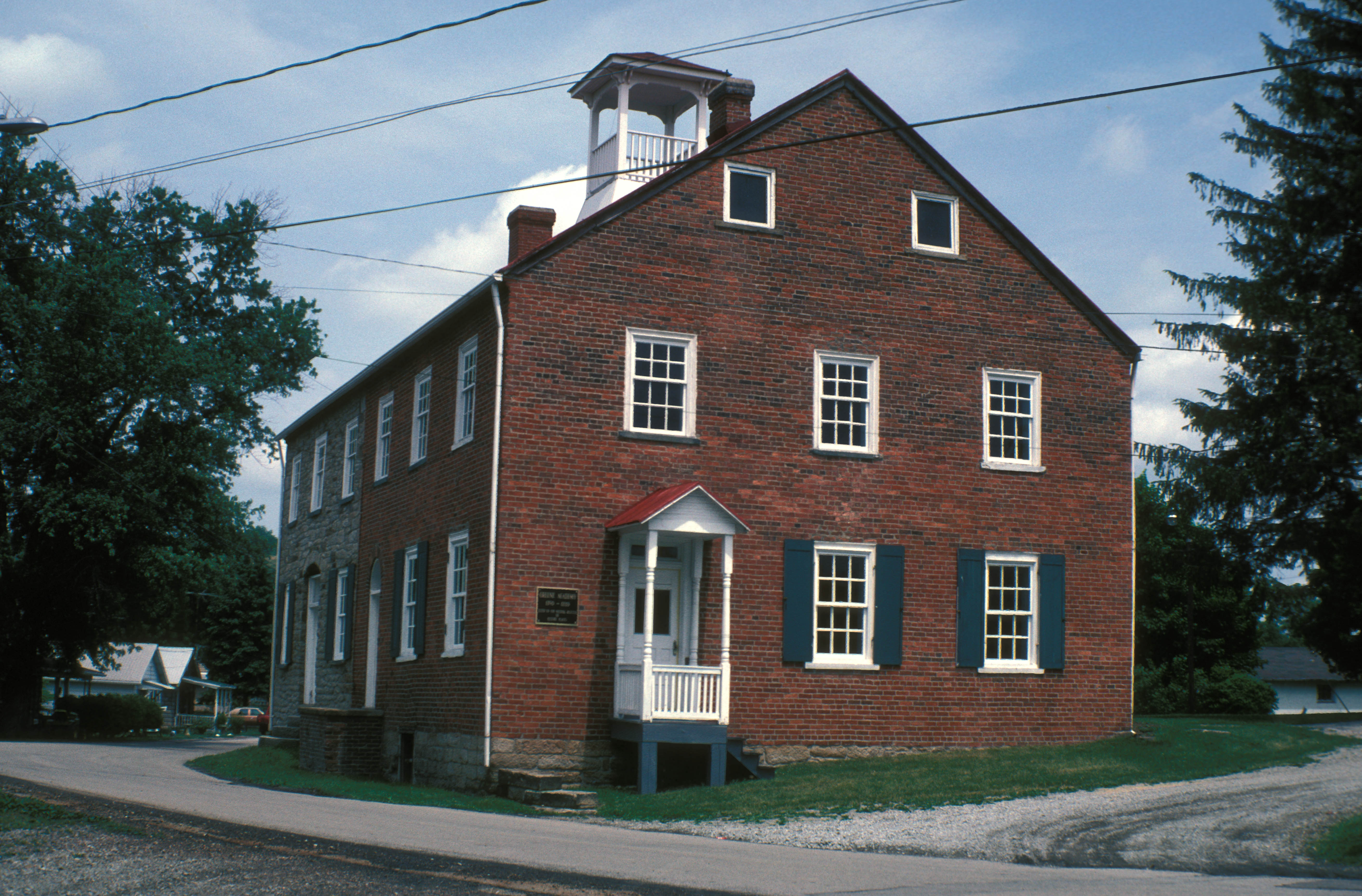

- Location within Pennsylvania Location within the United States
- Location: 314 N. Market St., Carmichaels, Pennsylvania
- Coordinates: 39°53′58″N 79°58′38″W
- Area: 0.3 acres (0.12 ha)
- Built: c. 1790
- NRHP reference No.: 76001643

Significant dates
- Added to NRHP: December 12, 1976
- Designated PHMC: May 22, 1953

The Greene Academy, now known as the Greene Academy of Art, is an historic school building which is located in Carmichaels in Greene County, Pennsylvania. It is a two-and-one-half-story stone and brick building with a gable roof.

It was listed on the National Register of Historic Places in 1976.

== History and architectural features ==
The stone section of this structure was built sometime around 1790 as an Episcopal church; the brick section was added in 1810.

A notable Academy graduate was politician Albert B. Cummins (1850–1926).

After the academy closed in 1893, the building was subsequently used for a Grand Army of the Republic meeting hall, as well as apartments. The building underwent restoration in the mid-1970s to house the Greene Academy of Art.
