= Peters-Graham House =

Historic house in Pennsylvania, United States

- U.S. National Register of Historic Places
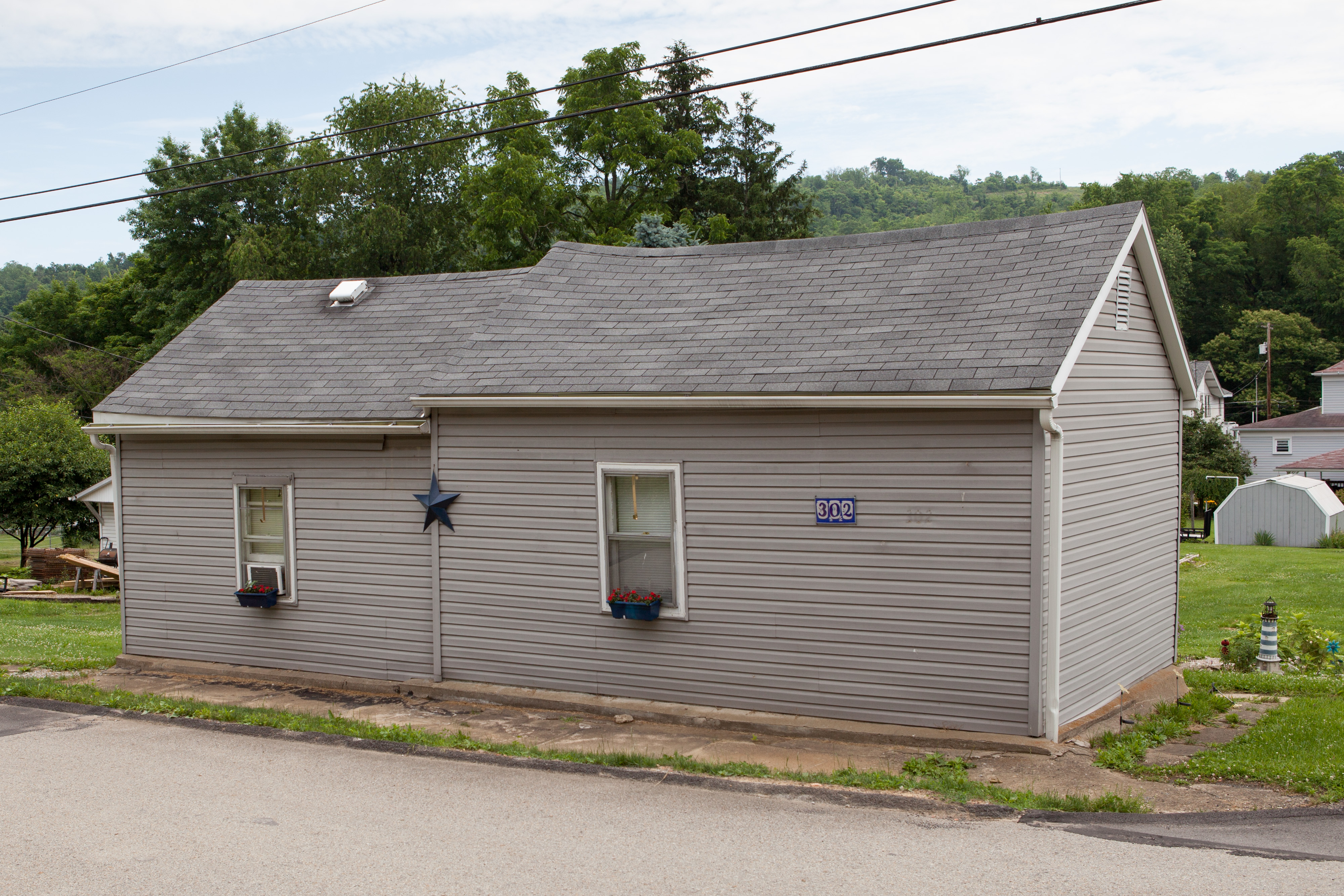
- From Second Street, June 2014.

- Location within Pennsylvania Location within the United States
- Location: Jct. of Walnut and Second Sts., Greensboro, Pennsylvania
- Coordinates: 39°47′34″N 79°54′47″W
- Area: less than one acre
- Built: c. 1859
- MPS: Greensboro--New Geneva MPS
- NRHP reference No.: 95000116
- Added to NRHP: March 9, 1995

The Peters-Graham House is an historic home that is located in Greensboro in Greene County, Pennsylvania, United States.

It was listed on the National Register of Historic Places in 1995.

== History and architectural features ==
The first section of this historic structure was built circa 1859, and is a one-story, single-pen, log dwelling that measures fifteen feet by thirteen feet. Attached to the house is an eighteen-foot by thirteen-foot timber-frame addition that was built in the mid- to late-nineteenth century. The two sections are covered by a shallow pitched roof. A shed roofed kitchen was added in the mid-twentieth century. It was built by Robert Peters, an African American and a formerly enslaved man who worked in the local potteries.
