= James Jones House =

Historic house in Pennsylvania, United States

- U.S. National Register of Historic Places
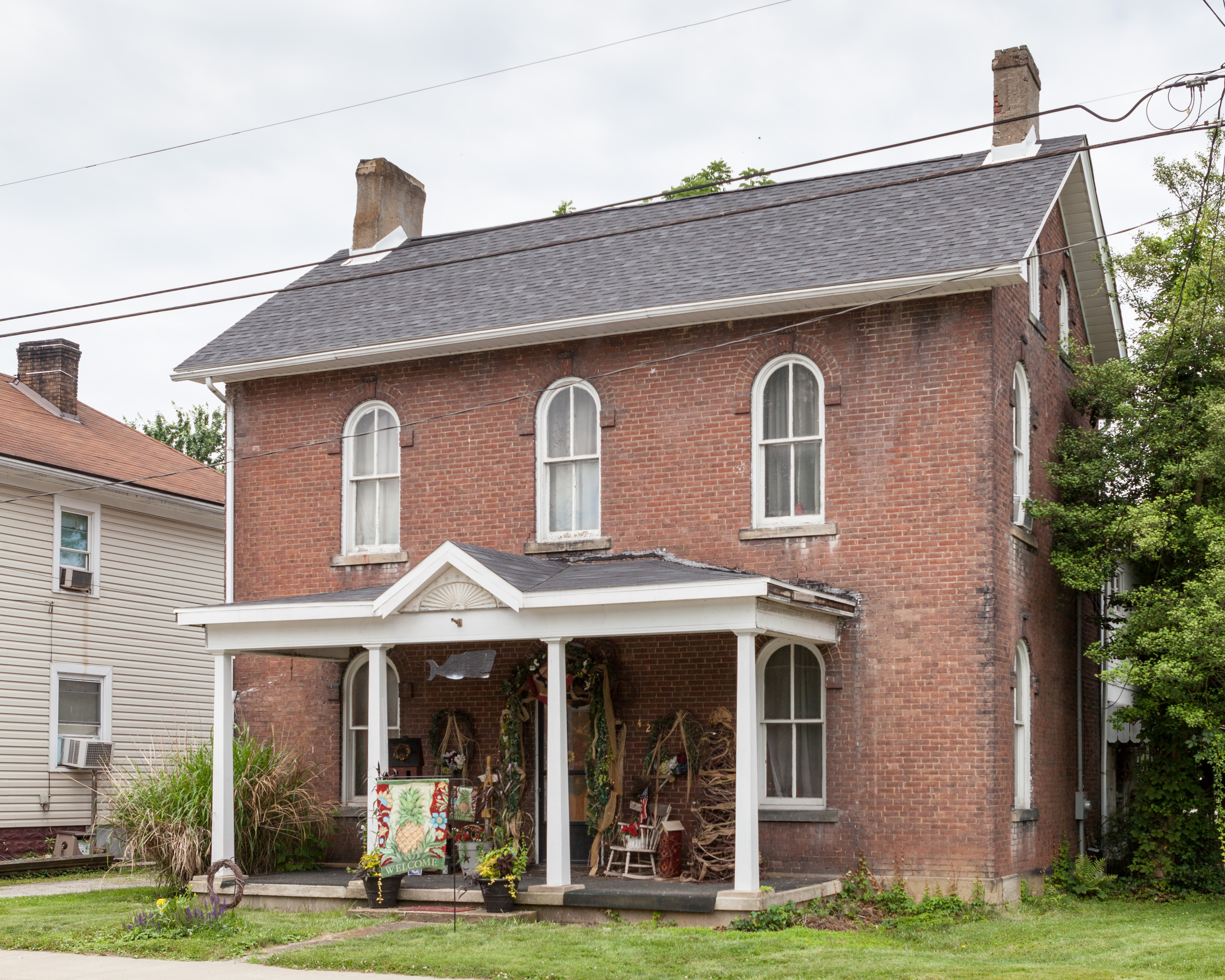
- From Front Street, June 2014

- Location within Pennsylvania Location within the United States
- Location: Jct. of Front and Stone Sts., Greensboro, Pennsylvania
- Coordinates: 39°47′37″N 79°54′41″W
- Area: less than one acre
- Built: c. 1879, c. 1900, c. 1950
- Architectural style: Italianate, Colonial Revival
- MPS: Greensboro--New Geneva MPS
- NRHP reference No.: 95000112
- Added to NRHP: March 9, 1995

The James Jones House is an historic home that is located in Greensboro in Greene County, Pennsylvania, United States.

It was listed on the National Register of Historic Places in 1995.

== History and architectural features ==
Built circa 1879, this historic structure is a 2 1/2-story, three-bay, "I"-plan, brick dwelling that was designed in the Italianate style. A front porch that was created in the Colonial Revival style was added circa 1900, and a 1 1/2-story frame addition was built circa 1950. The house features a shallow pitched roof with wide eaves and tall, arched windows with raised brick crowns.
