= Succinylglutamate-semialdehyde dehydrogenase =

succinylglutamate-semialdehyde dehydrogenase

Identifiers
- EC no.: 1.2.1.71

Databases
- IntEnz: IntEnz view
- BRENDA: BRENDA entry
- ExPASy: NiceZyme view
- KEGG: KEGG entry
- MetaCyc: metabolic pathway
- PRIAM: profile
- PDB structures: RCSB PDB PDBe PDBsum
- Gene Ontology: AmiGO / QuickGO
Search
- PMC: articles
- PubMed: articles
- NCBI: proteins

In enzymology, succinylglutamate-semialdehyde dehydrogenase (EC 1.2.1.71) is an enzyme that catalyzes the chemical reaction

N-succinyl-L-glutamic 5-semialdehyde
+ NAD^{+}
H_{2}O
H^{+}
H_{2}O
H^{+}
N-succinyl-L-glutamic acid
+ NADH

The three substrates of this enzyme are N-succinyl-L-glutamic 5-semialdehyde, oxidised nicotinamide adenine dinucleotide (NAD^{+}), and water. Its products are N-succinyl-L-glutamic acid, reduced NADH, and a proton.

This enzyme belongs to the family of oxidoreductases, specifically those acting on the aldehyde or oxo group of donor with NAD+ or NADP+ as acceptor. The systematic name of this enzyme class is N-succinyl-L-glutamate 5-semialdehyde:NAD+ oxidoreductase. Other names in common use include succinylglutamic semialdehyde dehydrogenase, N-succinylglutamate 5-semialdehyde dehydrogenase, SGSD, AruD, and AstD. This enzyme participates in arginine and proline metabolism.
