= Carmichaels, Pennsylvania =

Borough in Pennsylvania, US

- Borough
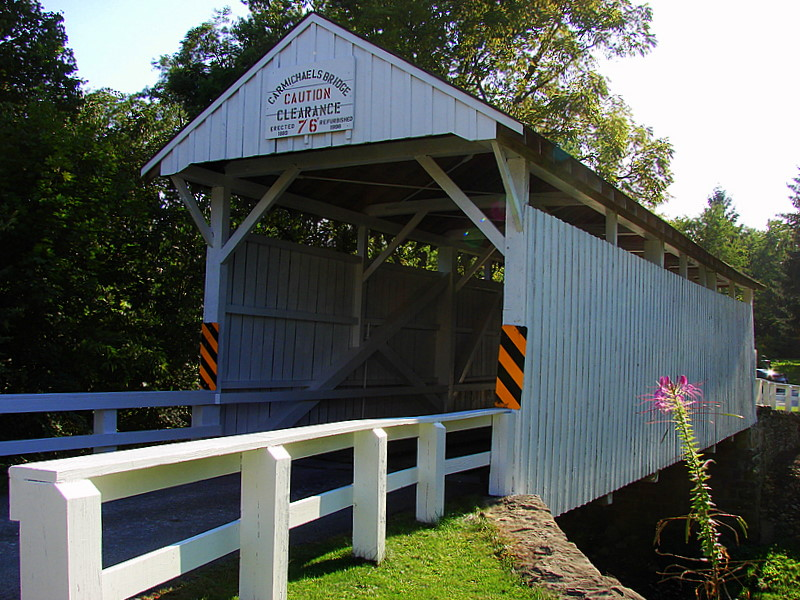
- Carmichaels Covered Bridge (1889); National Register of Historic Places

- Location of Carmichaels in Greene County, Pennsylvania.

- Location within Pennsylvania Location within the United States
- Coordinates: 39°53′52″N 79°58′30″W
- Country: United States
- State: Pennsylvania
- County: Greene
- Established: 1768

Government
  - Body: Carmichaels Borough Council
  - Mayor: Jeffrey Hathaway (Democrat/Republican)

Area
  - Total: 0.17 sq mi (0.44 km^{2})
  - Land: 0.17 sq mi (0.43 km^{2})
  - Water: 0.0039 sq mi (0.01 km^{2})
- Elevation: 1,004 ft (306 m)

Population (2020)
  - Total: 432
  - Estimate (2023): 409
  - Density: 2,619.7/sq mi (1,011.47/km^{2})
- Time zone: UTC-4:00 (EST)
  - Summer (DST): UTC-5:00 (EDT)
- Area code: 724
- FIPS code: 42-11328

Carmichaels is a borough in Greene County, Pennsylvania, United States. The population was 432 at the 2020 census, a decline from the figure of 483 tabulated in 2010.

== History ==
The Carmichaels Covered Bridge and Greene Academy are listed on the National Register of Historic Places.

Carmichaels, Pennsylvania is quite famous in its area for the Coal Queen Pageant, an annual beauty pageant where girls from all over Greene County compete to be crowned Coal Queen.

== Education ==
Carmichaels is home to the Carmichaels Area School District. There is an Elementary Center and a Jr/Sr High School on the same grounds, home of the Mighty Mikes.

== Geography ==
Carmichaels is located in eastern Greene County at 39°53′52″N 79°58′30″W (39.897755, -79.975022). It is surrounded by Cumberland Township but is a separate municipality.

Pennsylvania Route 88 passes through the borough, leading north 9 miles (14 km) to Fredericktown and south 14 miles (23 km) to Point Marion.

According to the United States Census Bureau, Carmichaels has a total area of 0.17 square miles (0.44 km^{2}), of which 0.004 square miles (0.01 km^{2}), or 2.86%, is water. Muddy Creek, a tributary of the Monongahela River, flows to the northeast through the northern corner of the borough, where it passes under the Carmichaels Covered Bridge on Old Town Road.

== Demographics ==
Historical population
Census	Pop.	Note	%±
1860	440		—
1870	491		11.6%
1880	489		−0.4%
1890	445		−9.0%
1900	456		2.5%
1910	478		4.8%
1920	581		21.5%
1930	708		21.9%
1940	847		19.6%
1950	895		5.7%
1960	788		−12.0%
1970	608		−22.8%
1980	630		3.6%
1990	532		−15.6%
2000	556		4.5%
2010	483		−13.1%
2020	432		−10.6%
2025 (est.)	401	▼	−7.2%

As of the census of 2000, there were 556 people, 232 households, and 141 families residing in the borough. The population density was 3,021.2 inhabitants per square mile (1,166.5/km^{2}). There were 255 housing units at an average density of 1,385.6 per square mile (535.0/km^{2}). The racial makeup of the borough was 98.20% White, and 1.80% from two or more races. Hispanic or Latino of any race were 0.18% of the population.

There were 232 households, out of which 26.3% had children under the age of 18 living with them, 42.7% were married couples living together, 14.7% had a female householder with no husband present, and 38.8% were non-families. 34.5% of all households were made up of individuals, and 19.8% had someone living alone who was 65 years of age or older. The average household size was 2.36 and the average family size was 3.03.

In the borough the population was spread out, with 23.4% under the age of 18, 8.1% from 18 to 24, 27.3% from 25 to 44, 24.8% from 45 to 64, and 16.4% who were 65 years of age or older. The median age was 40 years. For every 100 females there were 93.1 males. For every 100 females age 18 and over, there were 84.4 males.

The median income for a household in the borough was $33,462, and the median income for a family was $36,719. Males had a median income of $29,286 versus $20,125 for females. The per capita income for the borough was $14,979. About 8.3% of families and 10.4% of the population were below the poverty threshold, including 12.4% of those under age 18 and 8.3% of those age 65 or over.

== Electric generating station ==
Carmichaels is home to the Hill Top Energy Center. A newly constructed natural gas-fired power plant with a generating capacity of 625 megawatts, it began its operations in the summer of 2021.

== Notable people ==
- Todd Tamanend Clark, poet and composer, lived in Carmichaels from 1963 to 1965
- Albert B. Cummins, the Progressive Era's Iowa governor and U.S. senator, born in Carmichaels in 1850
- Richard Trumka, president of AFL–CIO since 2009 and previous president of United Mine Workers, born and raised in nearby Nemacolin and attended school in Carmichaels
- Pete Putila, General Manager of the San Francisco Giants, born in Carmichaels 1989
