= Reppert-Gabler House =

Historic house in Pennsylvania, United States

- U.S. National Register of Historic Places
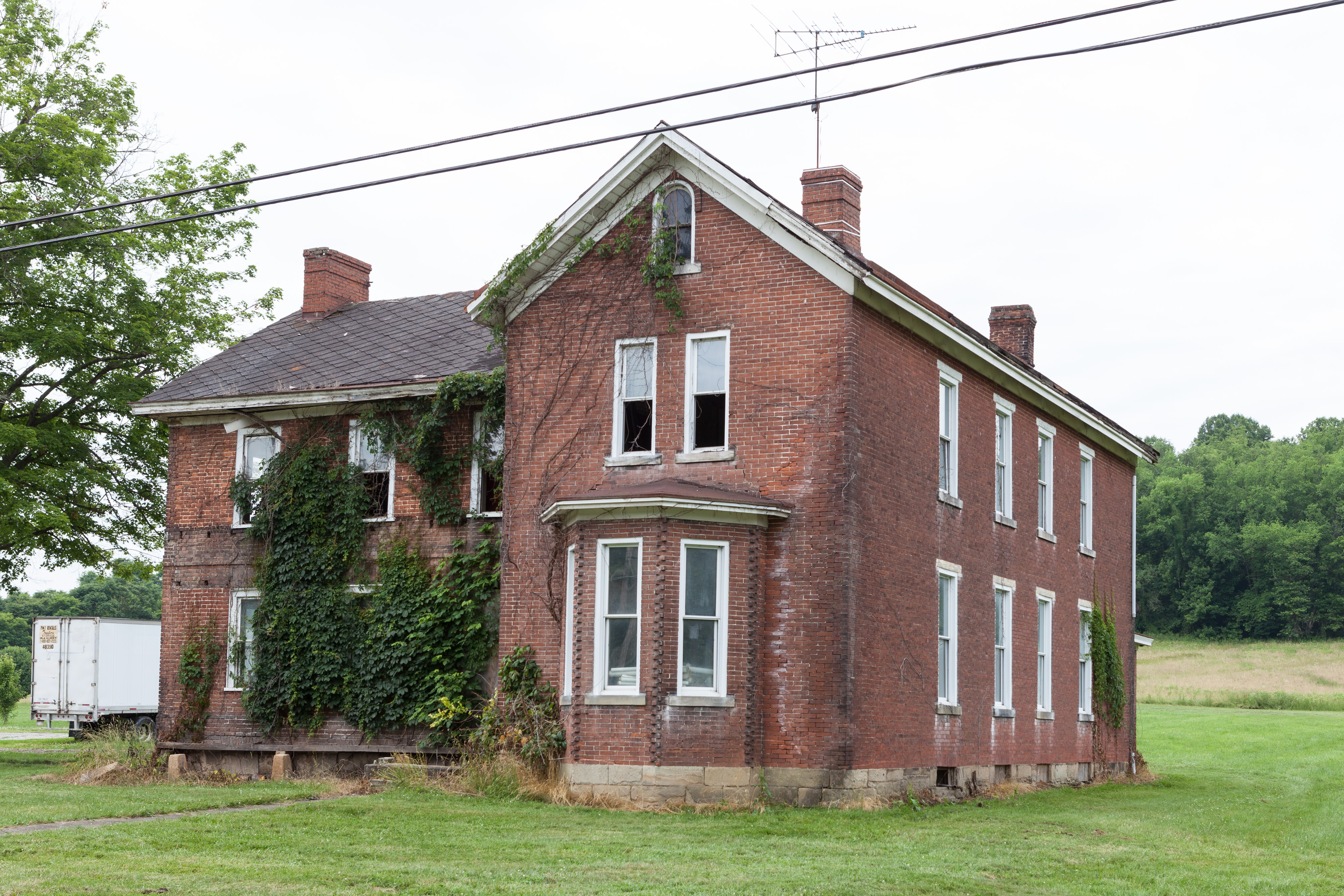
- Front and northern side in June, 2014

- Location within Pennsylvania Location within the United States
- Location: PA 2014 in Glassworks, Monongahela Township, Pennsylvania
- Coordinates: 39°47′58″N 79°54′49″W
- Area: less than one acre
- Built: c. 1810, c. 1880
- Architectural style: Federal, Italianate
- MPS: Greensboro--New Geneva MPS
- NRHP reference No.: 95000117
- Added to NRHP: July 27, 1995

The Reppert-Gabler House, also known as Building 314A, is an historic home that is located in Monongahela Township in Greene County, Pennsylvania, United States.

It was listed on the National Register of Historic Places in 1995.

== History and architectural features ==
The original section of this historic structure was built circa 1810, and is a 2 1/2-story, four-bay, brick dwelling that was designed in a vernacular Federal style. An addition was built circa 1880 that has Italianate-style details. The house is associated with the New Geneva Glassworks.
