= Monongahela Township, Pennsylvania =

Township in Pennsylvania, US

Coordinates: 39°50′00″N 79°57′29″W

Monongahela Township, Greene County, Pennsylvania
- Township
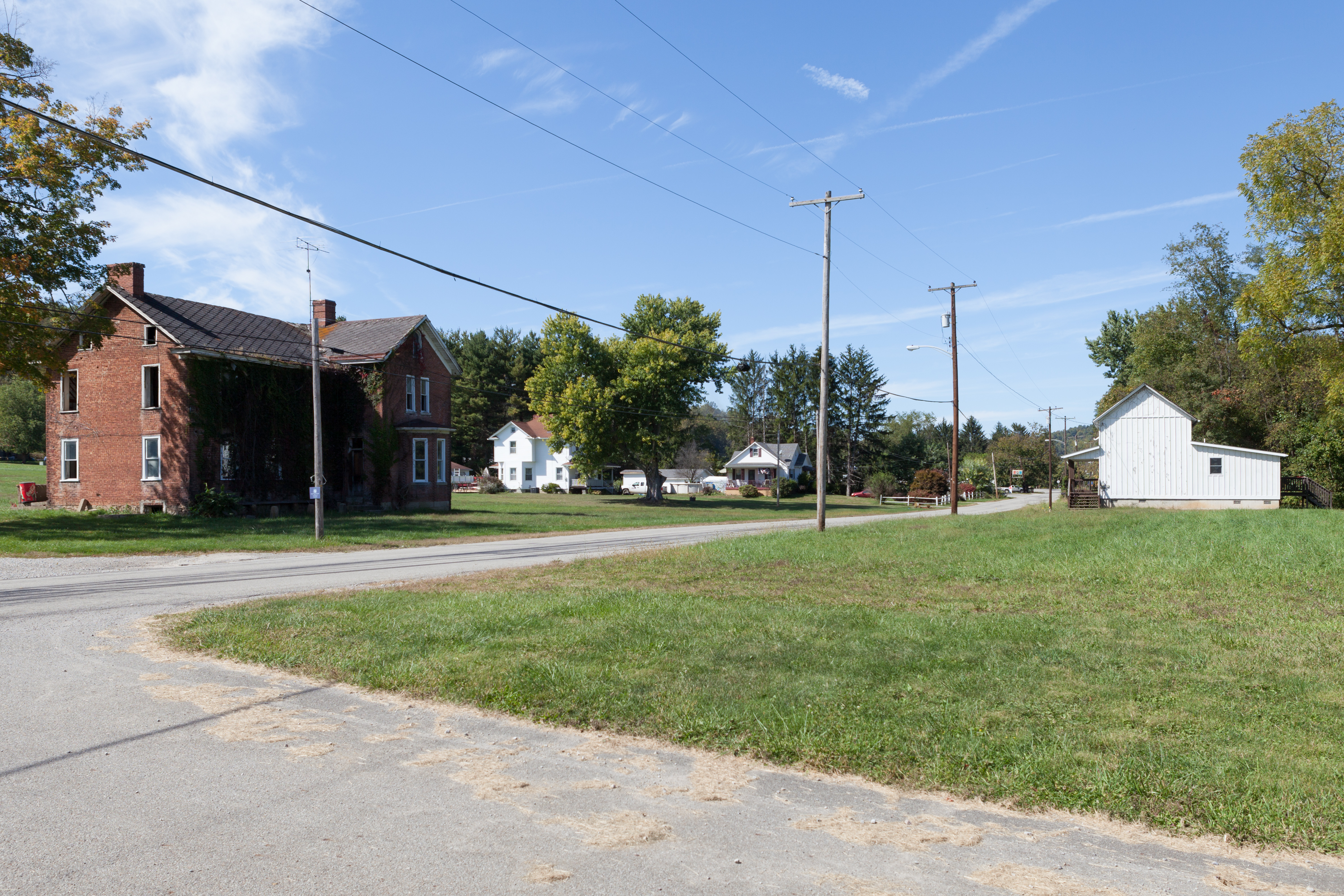
- Houses in the community of Glassworks

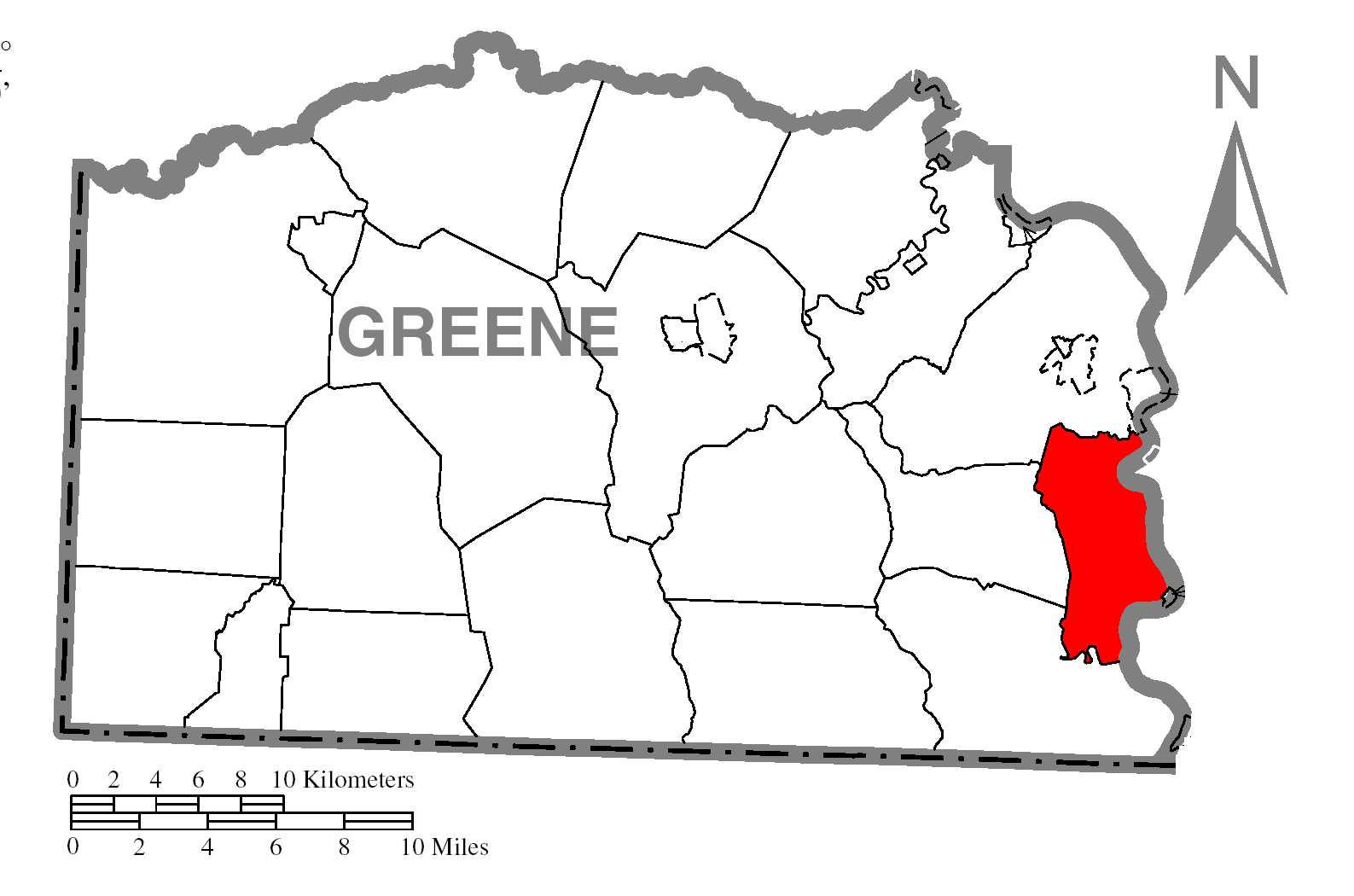
- Location of Monongahela Township in Greene County

- Location of Greene County in Pennsylvania
- Country: United States
- State: Pennsylvania
- County: Greene

Area
  - Total: 17.98 sq mi (46.58 km^{2})
  - Land: 17.43 sq mi (45.15 km^{2})
  - Water: 0.55 sq mi (1.42 km^{2})

Population (2020)
  - Total: 1,487 ▼
  - Estimate (2023): 1,438
  - Density: 87.4/sq mi (33.75/km^{2})
- Time zone: UTC-4 (EST)
  - Summer (DST): UTC-5 (EDT)
- Area code: 724
- FIPS code: 42-059-50400
- Website: https://montownship.org/

See also Monongahela, Pennsylvania

Monongahela Township is a township in Greene County, Pennsylvania, United States. The population was 1,487 at the 2020 census, down from 1,572 at the 2010 census.

== History ==
Monongahela Township is the location of a prehistoric petroglyph site known as the "Sugar Grove Petroglyphs". Created by an unknown pre-Columbian indigenous people, the petroglyphs are an archaeological site, and they have been listed on the National Register of Historic Places.

The Glassworks-Gabler House, Glassworks-Core House, John Minor Crawford House, and Reppert-Gabler House are also listed on the National Register of Historic Places.

== Geography ==
Monongahela Township is in eastern Greene County, bordered on the east by the Monongahela River, which forms the Fayette County line. According to the United States Census Bureau, the township has a total area of 18.0 square miles (46.6 km^{2}), of which 17.5 square miles (45.2 km^{2}) is land and 0.54 square miles (1.4 km^{2}), or 3.05%, is water.

Unincorporated communities within the township include Alicia, Sigsbee, Mapletown, Glassworks, Penn Pitt, Fieldsons Crossroads, Maple Hill, and Poland Mines. The borough of Greensboro, a separate municipality, borders the southeastern part of the township next to the Monongahela River.

== Demographics ==
Historical population
| Census | Pop. | Note | %± |
|---|---|---|---|
| 2000 | 1,714 | | — |
| 2010 | 1,572 | | −8.3% |
| 2020 | 1,487 | | −5.4% |
| 2025 (est.) | 1,415 | | −4.8% |
U.S. Decennial Census

As of the census of 2000, there were 1,714 people, 677 households, and 513 families residing in the township. The population density was 99.2 inhabitants per square mile (38.3/km^{2}). There were 726 housing units at an average density of 42.0 per square mile (16.2/km^{2}). The racial makeup of the township was 99.18% White, 0.23% African American, 0.12% Native American, 0.12% Asian, 0.06% from other races, and 0.29% from two or more races. Hispanic or Latino of any race were 0.29% of the population.

There were 677 households, out of which 31.0% had children under the age of 18 living with them, 59.5% were married couples living together, 11.1% had a female householder with no husband present, and 24.2% were non-families. 22.7% of all households were made up of individuals, and 13.0% had someone living alone who was 65 years of age or older. The average household size was 2.53 and the average family size was 2.91.

In the township the population was spread out, with 22.6% under the age of 18, 7.8% from 18 to 24, 25.8% from 25 to 44, 25.8% from 45 to 64, and 18.0% who were 65 years of age or older. The median age was 41 years. For every 100 females there were 100.2 males. For every 100 females age 18 and over, there were 98.5 males.

The median income for a household in the township was $30,192, and the median income for a family was $35,167. Males had a median income of $34,318 versus $21,875 for females. The per capita income for the township was $17,158. About 12.9% of families and 15.5% of the population were below the poverty line, including 23.0% of those under age 18 and 13.1% of those age 65 or over.
