= Greensboro, Pennsylvania =

Borough in Pennsylvania, US

- Borough
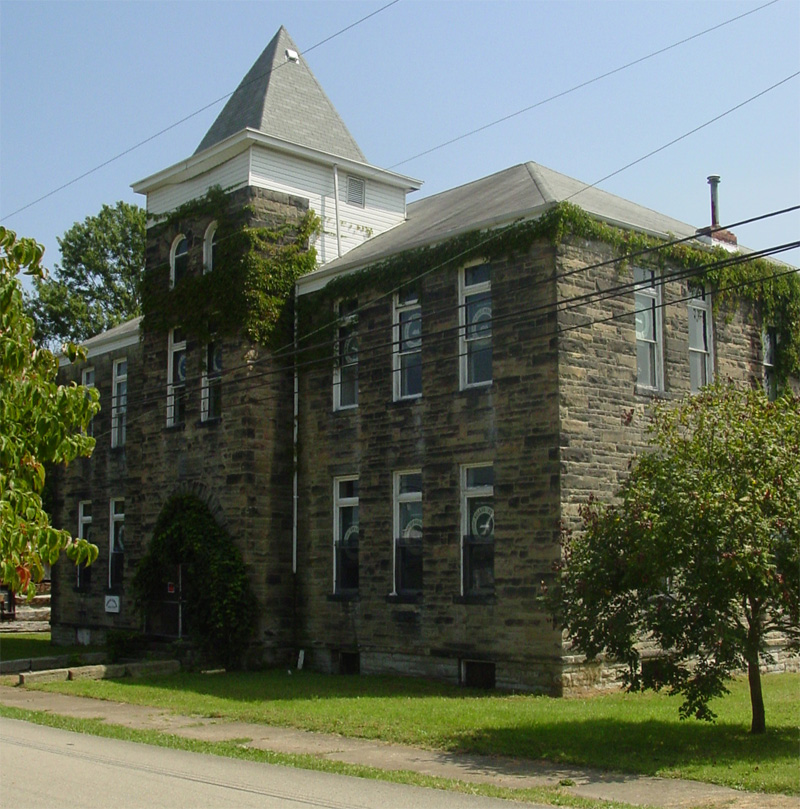
- Greensboro Public School; National Register of Historic Places
- Etymology: Nathanael Greene
- Location of Greensboro in Greene County, Pennsylvania.

- Location within Pennsylvania Location within the United States
- Coordinates: 39°47′34″N 79°54′44″W
- Country: United States
- State: Pennsylvania
- County: Greene
- Established: 1781

Area
  - Total: 0.15 sq mi (0.38 km^{2})
  - Land: 0.11 sq mi (0.28 km^{2})
  - Water: 0.039 sq mi (0.10 km^{2})
- Elevation: 800 ft (240 m)

Population (2020)
  - Total: 266
  - Estimate (2023): 253
  - Density: 2,438.5/sq mi (941.51/km^{2})
- Time zone: UTC-4 (EST)
  - Summer (DST): UTC-5 (EDT)
- Postal code: 15338
- Area code: 724
- FIPS code: 42-31192
- Website: greensboropa.org

Greensboro is a borough in Greene County, Pennsylvania, United States. The population was 266 at the 2020 census, up from 260 at the 2010 census.

== Geography ==
Greensboro is located in southeastern Greene County at 39°47′34″N 79°54′44″W (39.792911, -79.912087). It is situated on the west bank of the Monongahela River, opposite New Geneva and the mouth of George's Creek. It is bordered by Monongahela Township in Greene County to the north and west, and by Nicholson Township in Fayette County to the south and east, across the Monongahela. The county and township border follows the center of the river. The closest road bridges over the river are the Masontown Bridge on Pennsylvania Route 21, 8 miles (13 km) north of Greensboro by road, and the Albert Gallatin Memorial Bridge on Pennsylvania Route 88 at Point Marion, 6 miles (10 km) south of Greensboro.

According to the United States Census Bureau, the borough has a total area of 0.15 square miles (0.38 km^{2}), of which 0.11 square miles (0.28 km^{2}) are land and 0.04 square miles (0.10 km^{2}), or 26.06%, are water.

== History ==
=== The beginning of settlement ===
Like much of the region, Greensboro can trace its roots back to Native American settlement, to the Mingo tribes of the Northern Iroquois. What was to later become Greensboro was first known to the Mingo as "Delight", so named in recognition of the rich farmland that stretched along the banks of the Monongahela River. As early as 1752, settlers from the east and south began to stake their claims in the lands along the Monongahela. The first white settler of Delight was explorer-trader John Badolet, who was a close friend of John Minor. Minor was the leader of the first group to settle in the area presently known as Mapletown, to the northwest of Greensboro in Monongahela Township.

In the early 1780s, Elias Stone bought Delight and divided it into blocks and streets; these still carry their original names. On February 9, 1790, Stone's growing village was named "Greensburgh" (later changed to "Greensboro") in honor of the Revolutionary War hero Nathanael Greene, for whom Greene County was also named when it was formed from Washington County in 1796. Due to its advantageous geographic location along the river, it quickly became an early trading center for settlers and travelers heading north to Pittsburgh and to points West.

Albert Gallatin, a partner in Albert Gallatin & Company and later the Secretary of the Treasury under Presidents Thomas Jefferson and James Madison, purchased lots in Greensburgh in 1795. He also purchased a great deal of land in Fayette County, including what was to become later the town of New Geneva, directly across the river from Greensburgh. On a trip to Washington, D.C., Gallatin met a group of German glassblowers who were heading to Kentucky to form their own company. He urged them to consider settling in Greensburgh instead of Kentucky. With Gallatin's assistance, the group settled in nearby New Geneva and operated the New Geneva Glass Works there until about 1805. Around that time, Gallatin was appointed the Secretary of the Treasury and sold his interest in the glassworks to his partners. The remaining partners moved the operation across the river to the northern section of Greensburgh, which consequently took on the name of Glassworks.

=== Early development ===
Glassmaking was the primary industry for many Monongahela River towns, including the city of Pittsburgh as well as small towns such as New Geneva and Greensboro, for several decades preceding the Civil War. The late 18th-early 19th century New Geneva/Greensboro glassworks proved that quality glass, natural resources, and transportation networks could be effectively harnessed. After the Civil War, the manufacture of stoneware became Greensboro's leading industry, in addition to a prosperous clay tile manufacturer who specialized in roofing tiles. The mid 19th-century Greensboro stoneware potteries were among the most productive in the eastern United States. Talented artisans and craftsmen, along with the excellent nearby clay banks produced a distinctive blue-gray stoneware which had a large market. Due to its location at the head of the slack waters of the Monongahela, Greensboro's influence as a commercial and manufacturing center expanded far beyond its small boundaries.

By the 1850s, the slack water system of locks and dams had been developed by the Monongahela Navigation Company (later acquired by the Army Corps of Engineers), allowing for year-round travel from Pittsburgh to the Greensboro area. This permitted Greensboro to become a shipping point not only for southern Greene County but for parts of what is now northern West Virginia as well. Its growing industrial, commercial, and transportation significance in the mid-19th century helped transform the town into a social and cultural center. In the 1880s, Greensboro essentially lost the pottery and clay tile market due to more efficient producers, and with the extension of slack water transportation to Morgantown became a more localized port.

During this period, many of the present churches in the community were established, with the Greensburgh Lutheran Church forming first. Other churches soon followed, such as the Presbyterians, Baptists, Methodists, and eventually, Roman Catholics and Eastern Orthodox. As was the tradition for early churches, particularly Protestants, most of these groups began meeting for worship in a member's home, or during fair weather outside under large tents, with "circuit riders" as pastors until formal church structures could be built and an established clergy formed.

=== The industrial era and today ===
Around the start of the 20th century came industrialization, and Western Pennsylvania's role was vital in the transformation of the national economy. A part of the Klondike coal seam, which extends through most of eastern Greene County and western Fayette County, the Greensboro area was rich in the mineral that made the region famous around the world. Greensboro, being a community already established with the conveniences, commerce and trade, suddenly found itself as a growing cultural and economic hub for many growing "coal patch towns" sprouting up in the area during the area Coal Rush.

Coal became King, and with Western Pennsylvania as his capital, it was only logical that Greensboro became part of this movement. Indeed, the Penn-Pitt neighborhood was originally company housing for miners, as were the nearby Seventh Pool and Poland Mines areas, and countless others, many of which are lost to history today. Thousands of immigrants from Eastern and Southern Europe flooded into the region and brought with them new customs, traditions, and culture.

Coal also became Ruler. History has shown that any growth industry using thousands of underskilled, undereducated immigrant workers provides fertile ground for the lust of greed and opportunism. Many mines and their owners sought to capitalize on this and found ways to maximize their profits. As such, many workers found themselves "selling their soul to the company store", earning meager pay for a dangerous day's wage, only to be spent on company goods and rent in the patch towns created by these very companies, effectively making these workers willful individuals of "wage slavery". During this period the formation of unions such as the UMWA became more prevalent and necessary to represent the workers. Through the growth of the UMWA and events such as the "Red Neck Revolution of 1921" an era of wage slavery began to end.

At one point, the Greensboro area was famous for the Robena mine, known as the largest mine in the world at the peak of its production in 1946. Robena also became famous for a more tragic reason: in December 1962 37 miners died in an explosion at Robena No. 3, illustrating how precarious this work truly was.

Coal defined the region and the lives of those who inhabited it, and made not only Greensboro and the Monongahela Valley prosperous, but the nation as well. Yet this period was not to last, and as the coal seams became tapped out and the processes outdated and replaced with modern mechanical technology, communities like Penn-Pitt and Poland Mines began to fade as their reason for existence ceased.

While coal (followed by healthcare) currently remains the backbone for much of the economy of Greene County, Greensboro and other communities have been migrating away from such dependency and see benefits in non-industrial sources of employment in sectors such as ecotourism, agritourism, and community-supported agriculture (CSAs), as well as fishing, hunting, hiking and boating.

== Historic industries ==
=== Pottery ===
Early in the town's history, pottery became an important part of Greensboro's economic base, with the first operation owned and operated by Alexander Vance. Vance settled in Greensboro in the early 19th century, while still very young, and began a small pottery trade operation with his brother James. The stoneware was manufactured from local red clay and had a very distinctive coloring. The Vances eventually began to expand their operations, bringing in David Boughner, who took over the business in 1819 when the Vances left for Ohio. Boughner was the first operator to fire the stoneware in a salt kiln.

Although Boughner's operation may have been among the earliest and most advanced stoneware operation in the area, it was by no means the only one. James and William "Leet" Hamilton arrived from New Brighton, Pennsylvania, in 1850 and started a pottery manufacturing company of their own. The remains of their endeavors, which operated under the name James Hamilton and Company, can still be found along Water Street.

The original James Hamilton and Company did not last long, however, and in 1866 was sold to Leet's son Frank and a son-in-law named John Jones. Together Frank Hamilton and Jones expanded the business and began selling their wares on a grander scale. Hamilton and Jones was located on Diamond Street and for many years was the only rival to the cross-town operation of James Hamilton.

The company was also known as Star Pottery for a period of time, as well as the Union Works. The business continued to produce pottery for over thirty years and its reputation was widespread, although it never actually surpassed its rival in production. Eventually competition began to wear away at the profitability of the company, with a devastating fire in 1897 destroying the plant and forcing operations closed. Although the company attempted to move into the Williams and Reppert plant across town, efforts to start anew were futile. James Hamilton remained in control of his firm until 1880. A share of the business had been sold in 1866, but he continued to hold the majority interest for the next fourteen years until he sold out completely to Thomas Reppert and W.T. Williams. In 1884, Reppert purchased the entire business from Williams, making himself the sole proprietor. Williams was able to buy back into the business once again in 1890. Together Reppert and Williams manufactured stoneware for dealers in at least four states.

However, by the beginning of World War I, all significant production had ended and 1916 generally marks the end of stoneware manufacturing in Greensboro.

=== Glass ===
Albert Gallatin and several of his partners in Albert Gallatin & Co. founded the "glassworks district" with the help of German glassblowers Christian Kramer, Boltzer Kramer, John Gabler, Adolf Eberhart, Lewis Reitz and George Reppert.

Gallatin first met the glassblowers in 1792 at Tomlinson's Tavern in the mountains of Maryland. The glassworkers had left the recently closed Amelung Works of Frederick, Maryland, and were planning on migrating to Mays Landing, Kentucky, to set up a new glass factory. Gallatin reputedly persuaded them to establish a glassworks on his land in New Geneva.

The glassblowers went to see both New Geneva and the Mays Landing site. When notes were finally compared New Geneva was chosen. After much discussion, a co-partnership was entered into between Gallatin and James A. Nicholson on the one hand and the German glassblowers on the other. This partnership lasted until 1803, during which time the New Geneva Glass Works produced window glass for the early pioneers as well as bottles, bowls, and other items.

Following his appointment to the cabinet, Gallatin determined to withdraw from the glass firm and advertised on May 7, 1803, in The Tree of Liberty (a Pittsburgh newspaper), "Sale by Auction...One undivided half of the New Geneva Glassworks, a ferry across the Monongahela River, sundry lots and dwelling houses in the town of Greensboro.. ."

The Germans continued operations at New Geneva until 1807, when they moved the works to present-day glassworks near Greensboro because of the discovery of an outcrop of coal at that place.

The use of coal instead of the wood used at New Geneva greatly facilitated glass production, and its great abundance at Greensboro along with the nearby sand deposits supplied the works with most of the necessary raw materials until they closed in 1849.

Managed by the Kramers and operated by the Kramers and the other German families, the old glassworks produced window glass, with individual glassworkers blowing bottles, bowls and ornaments as gifts for family and friends. All of them worked for wages, dividing the profits at year's end.

Glass was loaded on barges from the special wharves built behind the works and shipped up and down the Monongahela, supplying the early settlers with what was once a luxury west of the Alleghenies, glass windows.

== Current preservation and revitalization efforts ==
Greensboro is a municipality that realizes the importance of keeping its past alive through the generations. Residents, elected officials, and community groups regularly work together to educate, promote, and conserve the rich history of this small rural community. In order to do this, both public and private partnerships have been established to meet the community's diverse needs. The many historical and conservation projects completed by the Greensboro community exemplify the fostering of private and public partnerships in a rural community. To date, over $3 million has been invested in projects that preserve and protect the history of this community.

Dating back to 1985 which coincidentally was the year of the 1985 Election day floods, the community identified the need to begin documenting their history. This began by first establishing the Historic District that now surrounds and protects much of the community. In 1987, Greensboro native Betty Longo began to record, in longhand, the memories of Mary Black Carr, an elderly resident of the community. These memoirs have proven to be a strong historical thread of the community. Beginning with these early acts of preservation, Greensboro has worked collectively to maintain its heritage by using all resources available. In 1987, the residents formed a Citizen's Advisory Planning Committee to deal with the changes coming because of the dismantling of Lock #7.

In building these partnerships, success has been achieved through the dedication of a handful of hard-working residents. Most recently, the Nathanael Greene Historical Foundation with support from borough council has been the organizer of historical preservation efforts.

In specific instances such as the preservation of the Log House, a partnership was first formed with the Army Corps of Engineering to relocate and restore the log cabin home. A partnership was also formed with the Pennsylvania Department of Labor and Industry's Civilian Conservation Corps to provide the labor needed to perform the restoration work on the building. These partnerships proved vital to the success of reopening the Log House not only as an historical building within the community, but also as a meeting facility that is available for community use. The efforts of this community prevented the destruction of this valuable historic asset, which now provides a location for the annual community Christmas Party and can be rented out for private functions. The nominal fees associated with renting the Log House help to provide additional revenue for the municipality.

Other projects include the preparation of a Historic District Homeowners Manual, the establishment of a municipal website that provides a summary of Greensboro history, the use of grant funds to build a boat launch, and the refurbishing of 28 homes using state funds. In addition, community festivals that display many of the historical artifacts are conducted yearly, and a comprehensive plan is underway with five neighboring municipalities. This community continues to strive to preserve their history and to educate their residents about their past while working to improve their future.

=== Historic District ===
- Greensboro Historic District
- U.S. National Register of Historic Places
- U.S. Historic district
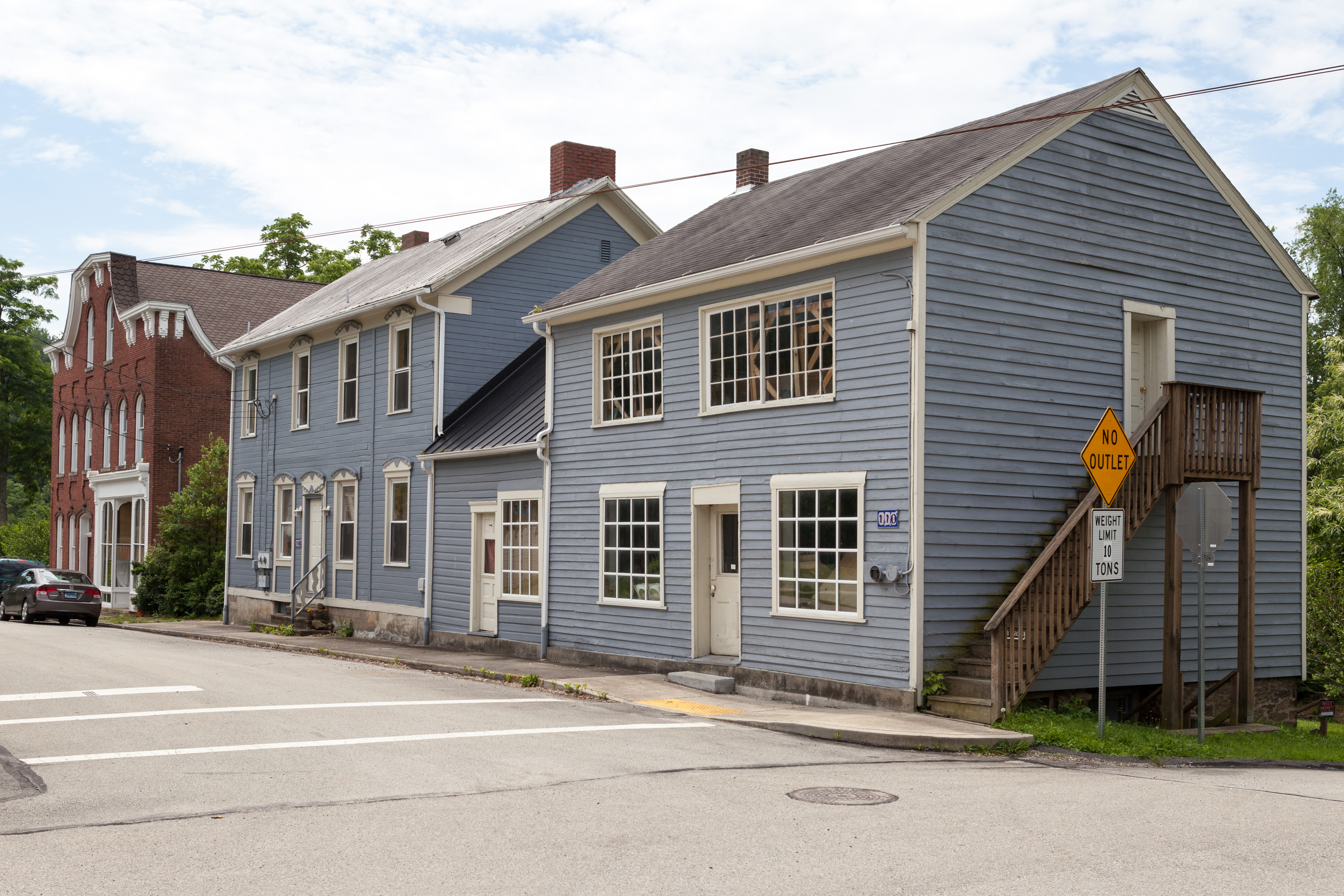
- Looking southeast down County Street from its intersection with 1st Street

- Location within Pennsylvania Location within the United States
- Location: Roughly bounded by County, Second, Walnut, Front and Clear Sts. and the Monongahela R., Greensboro, Pennsylvania
- Area: 14 acres (5.7 ha)
- Built: 1791
- Architect: Parreco, James; others
- Architectural style: Queen Anne, Italianate
- MPS: Greensboro--New Geneva MPS
- NRHP reference No.: 95000118
- Added to NRHP: November 17, 1995

The Greensboro Historic District was established in 1995 and is roughly bounded by County, Second, Walnut, Front and Clear streets and the Monongahela River. The Greensboro Historic District is a defined area of 14 acres (57,000 m^{2}) with a concentration of buildings, structures, and sites that contribute to the significance of the borough in terms of its importance in industry, commerce, architecture, archeology, and transportation. While the district's industrial and transportation significance are largely contained in the 19th century, its commercial and architectural significance extend into the early 20th century. Five other buildings within the borough outside the historic district boundaries are also included as having historical significance.

Within the Greensboro Historic District boundaries are 36 buildings, 29 of these are considered contributing. The wharf, built around the time of the Civil War, is also located within the District, as well as an archaeological site containing the location of the James and Hamilton Company pottery works.

The historic significance of the district is its architecture, which is representative of local vernacular architecture and displays elements of various popular styles ranging from the Italianate of the early 19th century to the Bungalow style of the early 20th century. Many dwellings are of the Queen Anne style. Few, if any, southwestern Pennsylvania towns can boast the range of architecture from its period of settlement to the 20th century as can be found in Greensboro. The period of significance for the district is 1750 to 1949. The structures contain a mix of commercial business, religious uses, a theater, and residential dwellings.

In addition to the Greensboro Historic District, the Greensboro Public School, Alexander V. Boughner House, Peters-Graham House, James Parreco House, and James Jones House are listed on the National Register of Historic Places.

== Demographics ==
Historical population
| Census | Pop. | Note | %± |
|---|---|---|---|
| 1880 | 482 | | — |
| 1890 | 427 | | −11.4% |
| 1900 | 399 | | −6.6% |
| 1910 | 442 | | 10.8% |
| 1920 | 516 | | 16.7% |
| 1930 | 598 | | 15.9% |
| 1940 | 625 | | 4.5% |
| 1950 | 651 | | 4.2% |
| 1960 | 505 | | −22.4% |
| 1970 | 439 | | −13.1% |
| 1980 | 377 | | −14.1% |
| 1990 | 307 | | −18.6% |
| 2000 | 295 | | −3.9% |
| 2010 | 260 | | −11.9% |
| 2020 | 264 | | 1.5% |
| 2025 (est.) | 248 | ▼ | −6.1% |

As of the census of 2000, there were 295 people, 117 households, and 80 families residing in the borough. The population density was 2,699.1 inhabitants per square mile (1,042.1/km^{2}). There were 140 housing units at an average density of 1,280.9 per square mile (494.6/km^{2}). The racial makeup of the borough was 98.64% White, 0.68% Asian, and 0.68% from two or more races. Hispanic or Latino of any race were 1.69% of the population.

There were 117 households, out of which 34.2% had children under the age of 18 living with them, 58.1% were married couples living together, 9.4% had a female householder with no husband present, and 31.6% were non-families. 29.1% of all households were made up of individuals, and 17.9% had someone living alone who was 65 years of age or older. The average household size was 2.52 and the average family size was 3.13.

In the borough the population was spread out, with 25.8% under the age of 18, 7.8% from 18 to 24, 26.1% from 25 to 44, 21.0% from 45 to 64, and 19.3% who were 65 years of age or older. The median age was 39 years. For every 100 females, there were 91.6 males. For every 100 females age 18 and over, there were 90.4 males.

The median income for a household in the borough was $36,875, and the median income for a family was $41,786. Males had a median income of $40,833 versus $19,375 for females. The per capita income for the borough was $18,176. About 13.1% of families and 13.4% of the population were below the poverty line, including 17.6% of those under the age of eighteen and none of those sixty five or over.

== Notable people ==
- Robert E. Eberly (Eberly Foundation), Mining, Oil, born in Greensboro in 1918
- Todd Tamanend Clark, poet and composer, was born in Greensboro in 1952.
