= New Geneva Glass Works =

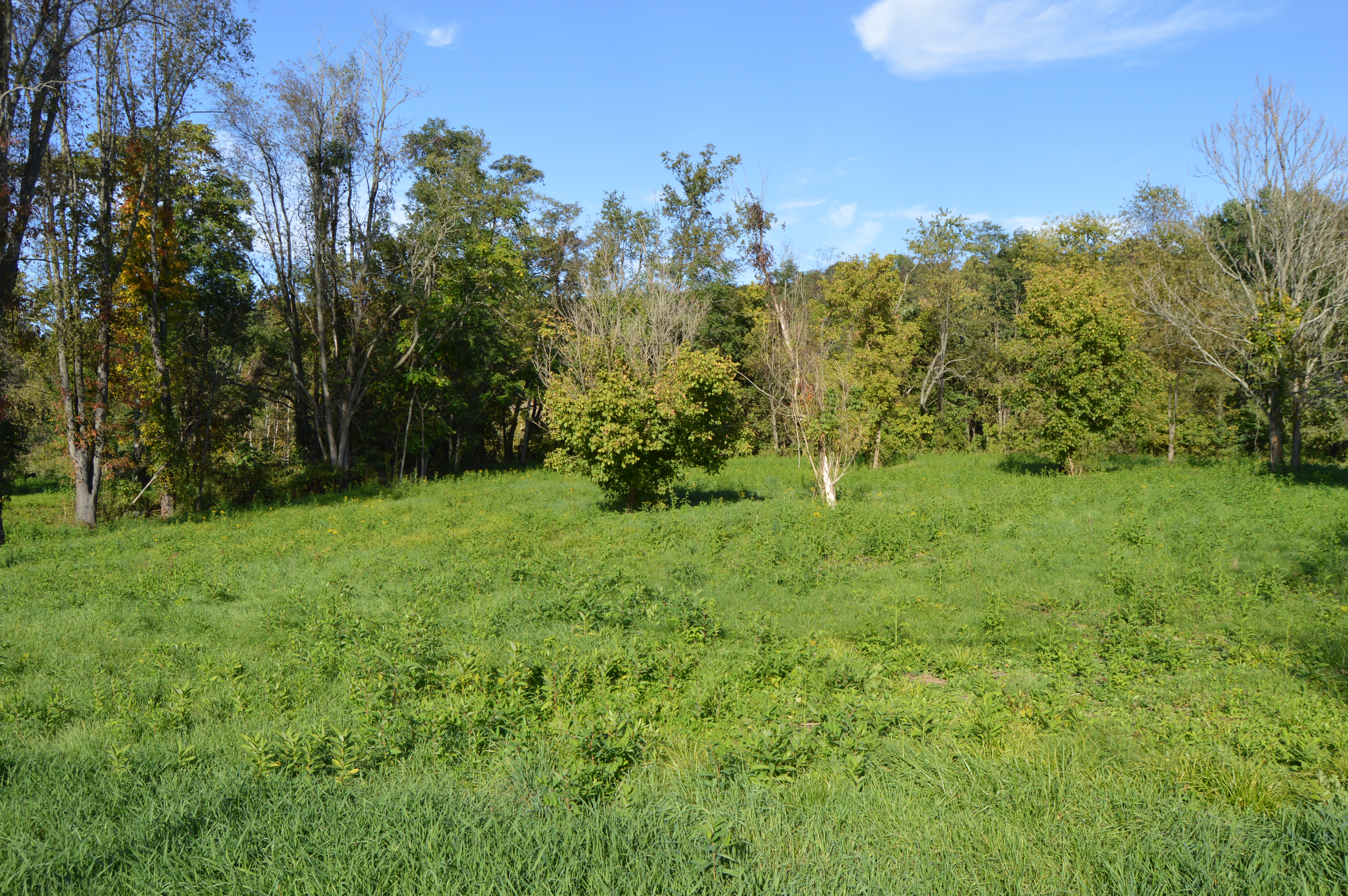
Site of the glassworks north of Greensboro, still an empty brownfield.

The New Geneva Glass Works was an early American glass factory established in western Pennsylvania, active from 1797 until 1847.

In 1795, Albert Gallatin gathered several investors together as Albert Gallatin & Company to purchase tracts of land including the towns of Wilson's Port, Georgetown, and unused lots across the Monongahela River in Greensboro. They named the community New Geneva and built a general store, gun factory, sawmill, and a gristmill. Several years later, in 1797, Albert Gallatin & Company partner John Baddolet wrote to Gallatin about a group of German glassblowers who wanted to build a glass factory in the area. John Gabler, Adolph Eberhart, George Reppert, Lewis Reitz, Baltzer Kramer, and Christian Kramer had the skills and knowledge of glassmaking, but needed the capital and land for a glassworks. Gallatin, Badollet, and the glassblowers entered into the venture, along with partners James Nicholson, Louis Bourdillon, and Charles A. Cazenove. The first glasshouse was built near Georges Creek and production began on January 18, 1798. The glassblowers mainly produced window glass, although whiskey bottles, bowls, and other hollow ware were also made.

Production soon grew to an annual average of 4,000 boxes of window glass. At the same time, the company was troubled by supply and production issues, including properly curing the wood they used for fuel, cleaning the sand used to make the glass, preparing batches of glass, and obtaining clay used to make furnace pots.

Gallatin maintained a half interest in the glassworks and provided all the sand and wood used until 1803. That May, he posted an advertisement in the Tree of Liberty, a Pittsburgh newspaper, announcing an auction of his interest in the glassworks, a ferry across the Monongahela River, and several properties in the town of New Geneva. There were no offers, and Gallatin sold his company shares to his partners. Shortly afterward, the partners decided to move the glassworks across the river to Greensboro and replaced wood with coal as their source of fuel. The Greensboro factory functioned from 1807 into the late 1840s, but closed in 1847 because it could no longer compete with newer, nearby glasshouses.

In 1837, the sons of Reitz and the Kramers (New Geneva's first glassblowers) founded a second glassworks in New Geneva and produced the same products as the earlier factories. The firm existed until 1857, when the last glass was made by John Gabler and Charles Kramer.

== See also ==
- 18th century glassmaking in the United States
