= Hobbs Run =

Stream in Pennsylvania, USA

Hobbs Run Tributary to Dunkard Creek
- Location of Hobbs Run mouth Hobbs Run (the United States)

Location
- Country: United States
- State: Pennsylvania
- County: Greene County

Physical characteristics
- Source: Calvin Run divide
  - location: about 2 miles northwest of Mount Morris, Pennsylvania
  - coordinates: 39°45′21″N 080°05′31″W
  - elevation: 1,240 ft (380 m)
- Mouth: Dunkard Creek
  - location: at Mount Morris, Pennsylvania
  - coordinates: 39°43′59″N 080°04′27″W
  - elevation: 900 ft (270 m)
- Length: 1.88 mi (3.03 km)
- Basin size: 0.70 square miles (1.8 km^{2})
- Discharge
  - location: Dunkard Creek
  - average: 1.03 cu ft/s (0.029 m^{3}/s) at mouth with Dunkard Creek

Basin features
- Progression: generally southeast
- River system: Monongahela River
- Tributaries
  - left: unnamed tributaries
  - right: unnamed tributaries
- Bridges: Hobbs Run Road (x2), Big Shannon Run Road

Hobbs Run is a 1.88 mi (3.03 km) long first-order tributary to Dunkard Creek in Greene County. This is the only stream of this name in the United States.

== Course ==
Hobbs Run rises about 2 miles south of Mount Morris, Pennsylvania and then flows southeasterly to join Dunkard Creek at Mount Morris, Pennsylvania.

== Watershed ==
Hobbs Run drains 0.70 square miles (1.8 km^{2}) of area, receives about 43.1 in/year of precipitation, and is about 84% forested.

== See also ==
- List of rivers of Pennsylvania
