= Watkins Run (Calvin Run tributary) =

Stream in Pennsylvania, USA

Watkins Run Tributary to Calvin Run
- Location of Watkins Run mouth Watkins Run (Calvin Run tributary) (the United States)

Location
- Country: United States
- State: Pennsylvania
- County: Greene County

Physical characteristics
- Source: Glade Run divide
  - location: about 2.25 miles north of Mount Morris, Pennsylvania
  - coordinates: 39°46′13″N 080°04′10″W
  - elevation: 1,120 ft (340 m)
- Mouth: Calvin Run
  - location: about 0.25 miles north of Mount Morris, Pennsylvania
  - coordinates: 39°44′44″N 080°03′49″W
  - elevation: 900 ft (270 m)
- Length: 1.73 mi (2.78 km)
- Basin size: 0.75 square miles (1.9 km^{2})
- Discharge
  - location: Calvin Run
  - average: 1.10 cu ft/s (0.031 m^{3}/s) at mouth with Calvin Run

Basin features
- Progression: generally south
- River system: Monongahela River
- Tributaries
  - left: unnamed tributaries
  - right: unnamed tributaries
- Bridges: Watkins Run Road, T601 Street

Watkins Run is a 1.73 mi (2.78 km) long first-order tributary of Calvin Run in Greene County.

== Course ==
Watkins Run rises about 2.25 miles north of Mount Morris, Pennsylvania, and then flows southerly to join Calvin Run about 0.25 miles north of Mount Morris, Pennsylvania.

== Watershed ==
Watkins Run drains 0.75 square miles (1.9 km^{2}) of area, receives about 43.2 in/year of precipitation, and is about 85.3% forested.

== See also ==
- List of rivers of Pennsylvania
