= Ironman Raceway =

Motocross track in Crawfordsville, Indiana, US

Coordinates: 40°00′20″N 86°55′45″W

- Location: 1389 W 200 S, Crawfordsville, Indiana 47933
- Owner: Shaver Family
- Operator: Shaver Family and MX Sports
- Broke ground: 2012
- Opened: 2014
- Major events: Lucas Oil Pro Motocross Championship GNCC Racing ATV Motocross National Championship
- Website: ironmanraceway.com

Pro Track
- Surface: Clay
- Length: 1.3 mi (2.1 km)
- Turns: 16

Amateur Track
- Surface: Clay
- Length: 1.1 mi (1.8 km)
- Turns: 15

Ironman Raceway is a motocross track in Crawfordsville, Indiana. Originating as a Grand National Cross Country venue beginning in 1995, the motocross course opened in 2014 due in part to the large success of the Ironman GNCC. The facility hosts events within the Lucas Oil Pro Motocross Championship the GNCC Racing Series, as well as a round of the ATV Motocross National Championship.

== Ironman History ==
During a trip to the Blackwater 100 GNCC event in the early 1990s, the Shaver Family came in contact with race promoter, Dave Coombs. After some discussion with Big Dave, they felt their family farm may be suitable for a GNCC event. Dave would send his son-in-law, Jeff Russell, to Crawfordsville, Indiana, to see the farm firsthand. After a brief tour, the decision was made to add the event to the GNCC schedule beginning in 1995. The event was named the "Ironman" in honor of two-time GNCC champion Bob Sloan, who hailed from Indiana and died in 1994.

Over the years the Ironman GNCC would grow with large numbers of spectators and racers converging on the facility. In 2012, the decision was made to break ground on a new motocross facility that would begin hosting Lucas Oil Pro Motocross Championship events beginning in 2014. Since then, the events have grown in size including the 2021 Ironman GNCC which saw a record 2,710 racers take part in the event.

== Past Pro Motocross Winners ==
=== 450 Class ===
Year	Rider	Hometown	Machine
2025	Hunter Lawrence	Landsborough, Australia	Honda
2024	Chase Sexton	Mendota, Illinois	KTM
2023	Jett Lawrence	Landsborough, Australia	Honda
2022	Chase Sexton	Mendota, Illinois	Honda
2021	Eli Tomac	Cortez, Colorado	Kawasaki
2020	Eli Tomac	Cortez, Colorado	Kawasaki
2019	Eli Tomac	Cortez, Colorado	Kawasaki
2018	Justin Barcia	Greenville, Florida	Yamaha
2017	Jeffrey Herlings	Netherlands	KTM
2016	Ken Roczen	Germany	Suzuki
2015	Ryan Dungey	Waconia, Minnesota	KTM
2014	Ken Roczen	Germany	KTM

=== 250 Class ===
Year	Rider	Hometown	Machine
2025	Haiden Deegan	Temecula, California	Yamaha
2024	Tom Vialle	Avignon, France	KTM
2023	Jo Shimoda	Suzuka, Mie, Japan	Kawasaki
2022	Jett Lawrence	Landsborough, Australia	Honda
2021	Jett Lawrence	Landsborough, Australia	Honda
2020	Jeremy Martin	Millville, Minnesota	Honda
2019	Dylan Ferrandis	France	Yamaha
2018	Aaron Plessinger	Hamilton, Ohio	Yamaha
2017	Zach Osborne	Abingdon, Virginia	Husqvarna
2016	Austin Forkner	Richards, Missouri	Kawasaki
2015	Aaron Plessinger	Hamilton, Ohio	Yamaha
2014	Marvin Musquin	France	KTM

== GNCC Overall Winners ==
=== GNCC Bike Overall Winners ===
Beginning in 2021 two annual GNCC events held at Ironman Raceway with a spring event known as the Hoosier GNCC, in addition to the traditional Ironman GNCC in late fall.

Year	Rider	Hometown	Brand
2021 Ironman	Thad Duvall	Williamstown, West Virginia	Husqvarna
2021 Hoosier	Steward Baylor	Belton, South Carolina	Yamaha
2020	Josh Strang	Australia	Kawasaki
2019	Ben Kelley	Harwinton, Connecticut	KTM
2018	Steward Baylor	Belton, South Carolina	KTM
2017	Kailub Russell	Boonville, North Carolina	KTM
2016	Kailub Russell	Boonville, North Carolina	KTM
2015	Josh Strang	Australia	Husqvarna
2014	Kailub Russell	Boonville, North Carolina	KTM
2013	Kailub Russell	Boonville, North Carolina	KTM
2012	Charlie Mullins	Hamilton, Ohio	KTM
2011	Charlie Mullins	Hamilton, Ohio	KTM
2010	Paul Whibley	New Zealand	Yamaha
2009	Nate Kanney	High Falls, New York	KTM
2008	Nate Kanney	High Falls, New York	KTM
2007	David Knight	Isle of Man	KTM
2006	Nate Kanney	High Falls, New York	Yamaha
2005	Juha Salminen	Finland	KTM
2004	Barry Hawk	Smithfield, Pennsylvania	Yamaha
2003	Rodney Smith	Antioch, California	Suzuki
2002	Rodney Smith	Antioch, California	Suzuki
2001	Shane Watts	Australia	KTM
2000	Shane Watts	Australia	KTM
1999	Shane Watts	Australia	KTM
1998	Rodney Smith	Antioch, California	Suzuki
1997	Rodney Smith	Antioch, California	Suzuki
1996	Rodney Smith	Antioch, California	Suzuki
1995	Scott Plessinger	Hamilton, Ohio	KTM

=== GNCC ATV Overall Winners ===
Year	Rider	Hometown	Brand
2021 Ironman	Cole Richardson	Edinburg, Pennsylvania	Yamaha
2021 Hoosier	Brycen Neal	Bidwell, Ohio	Yamaha
2020	Brycen Neal	Bidwell, Ohio	Yamaha
2019	Hunter Hart	Newfield, New York	Yamaha
2018	Walker Fowler	Rogers, Ohio	Yamaha
2017	Walker Fowler	Rogers, Ohio	Yamaha
2016	Jarrod McClure	Kaska, Pennsylvania	Honda
2015	Jarrod McClure	Kaska, Pennsylvania	Honda
2014	Chris Borich	Sunbury, Pennsylvania	Suzuki
2013	Chris Borich	Sunbury, Pennsylvania	Suzuki
2012	Walker Fowler	Rogers, Ohio	Yamaha
2011	Chris Borich	Sunbury, Pennsylvania	Suzuki
2010	Chris Borich	Sunbury, Pennsylvania	Suzuki
2009	Chris Borich	Sunbury, Pennsylvania	Suzuki
2008	Chris Borich	Sunbury, Pennsylvania	Suzuki
2007	Bill Ballance	Oakland, Kentucky	Yamaha
2006	Chris Borich	Sunbury, Pennsylvania	Honda
2005	William Yokley	Tompkinsville, Kentucky	Kawasaki
2004	William Yokley	Tompkinsville, Kentucky	Suzuki
2003	Bill Ballance	Oakland, Kentucky	Roll Design
2002	William Yokley	Tompkinsville, Kentucky	Roll Design
2001	William Yokley	Tompkinsville, Kentucky	Kawasaki
2000	Matt Smiley	Saylorsburg, Pennsylvania	Roll Design
1999	Chad Duvall	Williamstown, West Virginia	Roll Design
1998	William Yokley	Tompkinsville, Kentucky	Roll Design
1997	Barry Hawk	Smithfield, Pennsylvania	Laegers
1996	Barry Hawk	Smithfield, Pennsylvania	Laegers
1995	Steve Holbert	Mount Morris, Pennsylvania	Honda

== ATV Motocross Past Winners ==
Year	Rider	Hometown	Brand
2019	Chad Wienen	Galena, Illinois	Yamaha
2018	Chad Wienen	Galena, Illinois	Yamaha
2017	Joel Hetrick	Seneca, Pennsylvania	Honda
2016	Joel Hetrick	Seneca, Pennsylvania	Honda
2015	Thomas Brown	Sanger, Texas	Yamaha

== MXoN Motocross of Nations ==
Year	Riders	Country	Brand(s)
2025	Jett Lawrence, Hunter Lawrence, Kyle Webster	Australia	Honda
