= US motocross race track =

Race tracks designed for the sport of motocross

Race tracks designed for the sport of motocross

AMA Sanctioned Tracks
Name	Location	Established	Years active	Note
Red Bud MX	Buchanan, Michigan	1973	1974 to present	Hosted the 72nd running of the Motocross of Nations on October 6–7, 2018 and the 75th running of the Motocross of Nations on September 24-25, 2022.
Hangtown MX Track - Prairie City SVRA	Rancho Cordova, CA	1979	1979 to present	Founded by the Dirt Diggers Motorcycle club 1968.
Glen Helen Raceway	San Bernardino, CA	1985	1993 to present	Has hosted the MXGP of the United States multiple times.
Fox Raceway at Pala	Pala, CA	2010	2010 to present	Run by the Pala Band of Mission Indians.
Washougal MX Park	Washougal, WA	1970	1970 to present	
Thunder Valley Motocross Park	Lakewood, CO	1999	2005 to present	Hosted the 64th running of the Motocross of Nations in 2010.
High Point Raceway	Mt. Morris, PA	1976	1977 to present	
The Wick 338	Southwick, MA	1973	1976 to present	Named for American Legion Post 338.
Spring Creek MX Park	Millville, MN			
Unadilla MX	New Berlin, NY	1969	1972 to present	Hosted the 41st running of the Motocross of Nations in 1987.
Budds Creek Motocross Park	Mechanicsville, MD		1989 to present	Hosted the 61st running of the Motocross of Nations in 2007.
Ironman Raceway	Crawfordsville, IN	2012	2014 to present	Also home of the Ironman GNCC
Muddy Creek Raceway	Blountville, TN	1986		
Steel City Raceway	Delmont, PA			
WW Ranch Motocross Park	Jacksonville, FL			Hosted the 2017 MXGP USA
Broome-Tioga Sports Center	Binghamton, NY			
Miller Motorsports Park	Tooele, UT			
Lake Elsinore	Lake Elsinore, CA			
Freestone Raceway	Wortham, TX	2007	2007-2012	
Kenworthy's Motocross Park	Troy, OH			
Gatorback Cycle Park	Gainesville, FL			
Lake Sugar Tree MX Park	Axton, VA			
Good Times MX Park	San Antonio, TX			
Secession MX Park	Anderson, SC			
Lakewood Sportcycle Park	Lakewood, CO			
Lakewood Sports Center	Lakewood, CO			
Hollister Hills	Hollister, CA			
Las Vegas Motocross Park	Las Vegas, NV			
Six Flags	Atlanta, GA			
Saddleback Park	Orange, CA	1967	1967 - 1984	Main track was designed by Joel Robert and Roger DeCoster.
Lake Whitney Cycle Ranch	Lake Whitney, TX			
Sunshine Speedway	St. Petersburg, FL			
Road Atlanta	Atlanta, GA			
CDR Tech Track	Castle Rock, CO			
Carlsbad Raceway	Carlsbad, CA			
Atlanta International Raceway	Atlanta, GA			
Sears Point International Raceway	Sonoma, CA			
Sunshine Speedway	St. Petersburg, FL			
Omaha Moto Park	Herman, NE			
Rio Bravo MX Park	Houston, TX			
Metrolina Speedway Park	Charlotte, NC			
Cycle World USA	St. Peters, MO			
Midland Motocross Park	Midland, MI			
Cycle-Rama	San Antonio, TX			
Moto-Masters Park	Mexico, NY			
Delta Motorsport Park	Delta, OH			
Motocross West	New Orleans, LA			
