= Dooley Run =

Stream in Pennsylvania, USA

Dooley Run Tributary to Dunkard Creek
- Location of Dooley Run mouth Dooley Run (the United States)

Location
- Country: United States
- State: Pennsylvania; West Virginia
- County: Greene County; Monongalia County

Physical characteristics
- Source: Robinson Run divide
  - location: about 1.7 miles southeast of Mount Morris, Pennsylvania
  - coordinates: 39°43′05″N 080°02′26″W
  - elevation: 1,200 ft (370 m)
- Mouth: Dunkard Creek
  - location: about 1.3 miles northeast of Mount Morris, Pennsylvania
  - coordinates: 39°44′55″N 080°02′41″W
  - elevation: 889 ft (271 m)
- Length: 2.32 mi (3.73 km)
- Basin size: 1.78 square miles (4.6 km^{2})
- Discharge
  - location: Dunkard Creek
  - average: 2.60 cu ft/s (0.074 m^{3}/s) at mouth with Dunkard Creek

Basin features
- Progression: generally north
- River system: Monongahela River
- Tributaries
  - left: unnamed tributaries
  - right: unnamed tributaries
- Bridges: Bald Hill Road, Ellsworth Avenue

Dooley Run is a 2.32 mi (3.73 km) long first-order tributary to Dunkard Creek in Greene County and Monongalia County, West Virginia. This is the only stream of this name in the United States.

== Course ==
Dooley Run rises about 1.7 miles southeast of Mount Morris, Pennsylvania in West Virginia and then flows northerly to join Dunkard Creek about 1.3 miles northeast of Mount Morris, Pennsylvania.

== Watershed ==
Dooley Run drains 1.78 square miles (4.6 km^{2}) of area, receives about 43.4 in/year of precipitation, and is about 78.8% forested.

== See also ==
- List of rivers of Pennsylvania
- List of rivers of West Virginia
