= Shannopin Coal Co =

Coordinates: 39.7646°N 79.9792°W

The Shannopin Coal Co was located in Greene County, Pennsylvania in the area of Bobtown which is in Dunkard Township. It roughly covered 8,200 acres (33 km^{2}) and mined the Pittsburgh coal seam from 1926 until 1993. It closed in 1993 and is currently in bond forfeiture status with Pennsylvania Department of Environmental Protection.

Currently, the mine is filling with water which is resulting in an acid mine drainage discharge into Dunkard Creek. The mine pool in the Shannopin Mine is rising at over one foot per month. In addition, the grounds are used as a dumping location by local people and seems to be an open location.
