= Bacon Run (Dunkard Creek tributary) =

Stream in Pennsylvania, USA

Bacon Run Tributary to Dunkard Creek
- Location of Bacon Run mouth Bacon Run (Dunkard Creek tributary) (the United States)

Location
- Country: United States
- State: Pennsylvania
- County: Greene County

Physical characteristics
- Source: Fox divide
  - location: about 2.5 miles northwest of Mount Morris, Pennsylvania
  - coordinates: 39°45′39″N 080°06′06″W
  - elevation: 1,160 ft (350 m)
- Mouth: Dunkard Creek
  - location: about 1 mile west-southwestMount Morris, Pennsylvania
  - coordinates: 39°43′53″N 080°05′18″W
  - elevation: 900 ft (270 m)
- Length: 2.16 mi (3.48 km)
- Basin size: 1.04 square miles (2.7 km^{2})
- Discharge
  - location: Dunkard Creek
  - average: 1.60 cu ft/s (0.045 m^{3}/s) at mouth with Dunkard Creek

Basin features
- Progression: generally southeast
- River system: Monongahela River
- Tributaries
  - left: unnamed tributaries
  - right: unnamed tributaries
- Bridges: Bacons Run Road, Bacon Run Road (x2), Big Shannon Run Road

Bacon Run is a 2.11 mi (3.40 km) long first-order tributary to Dunkard Creek in Greene County.

== Course ==
Bacon Run rises about 2.5 miles northwest of Mount Morris, Pennsylvania and then flows southeasterly to join Dunkard Creek about 1 mile west-southwest of Mount Morris, Pennsylvania.

== Watershed ==
Bacon Run drains 1.04 square miles (2.7 km^{2}) of area, receives about 43.1 in/year of precipitation, and is about 80.3% forested.

== See also ==
- List of rivers of Pennsylvania
