= Perry Township, Greene County, Pennsylvania =

Township in Pennsylvania, US

Coordinates: 39°44′57″N 80°07′32″W

- Township
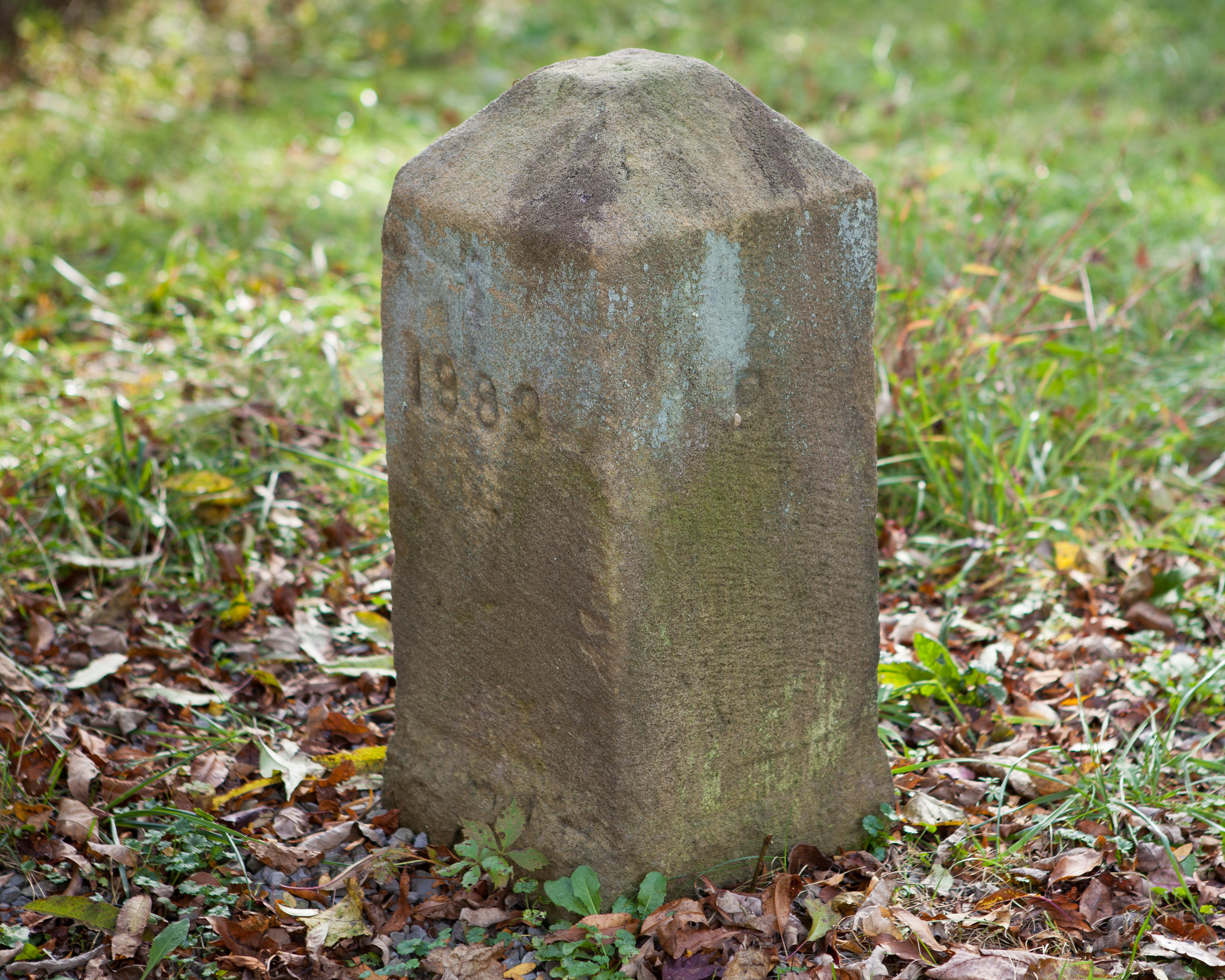
- Western terminus of the Mason–Dixon line

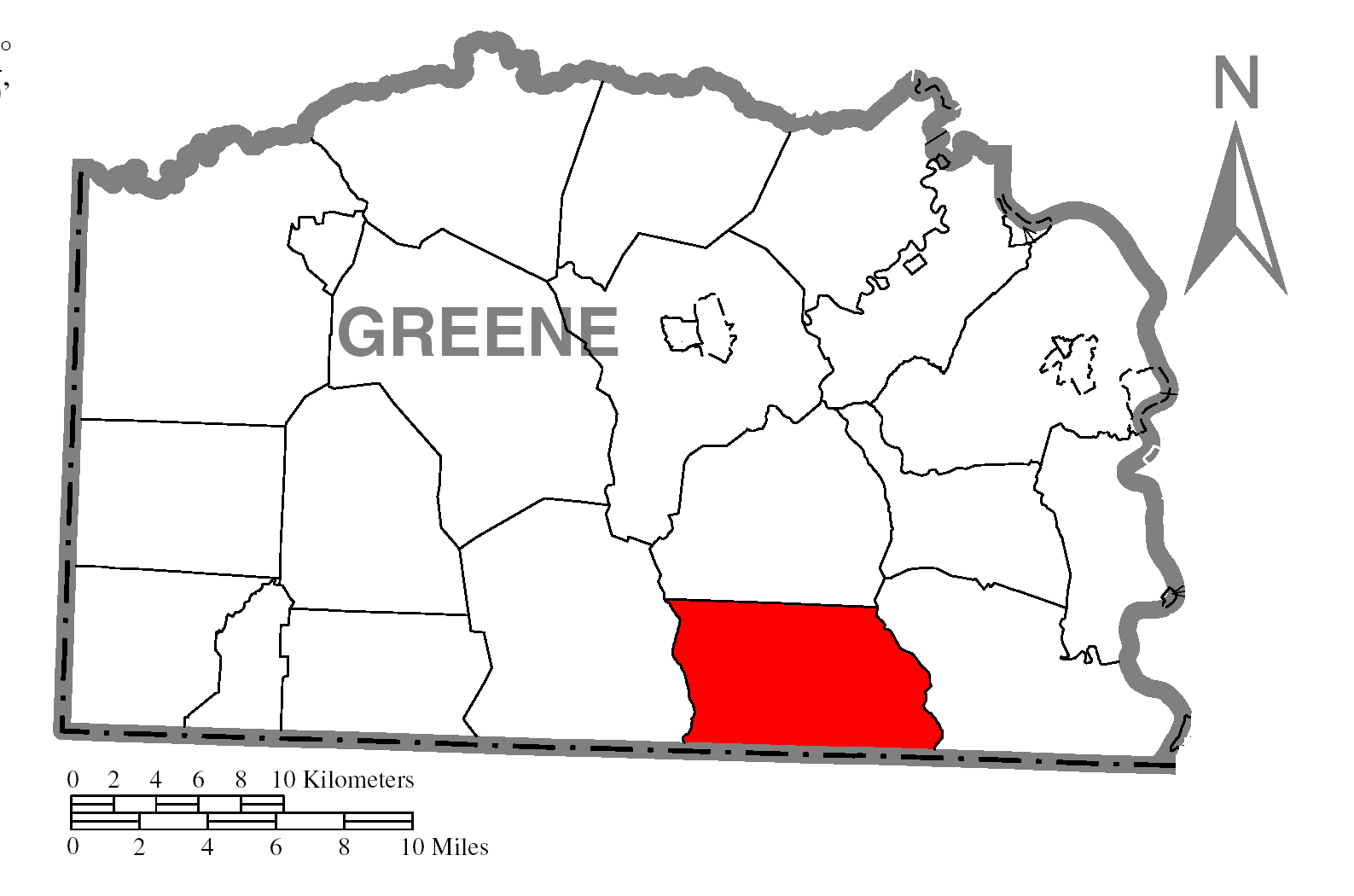
- Location of Perry Township in Greene County

- Location of Greene County in Pennsylvania
- Country: United States
- State: Pennsylvania
- County: Greene

Area
  - Total: 30.24 sq mi (78.33 km^{2})
  - Land: 30.23 sq mi (78.29 km^{2})
  - Water: 0.012 sq mi (0.03 km^{2})

Population (2020)
  - Total: 1,393 ▼
  - Estimate (2023): 1,343
  - Density: 47.9/sq mi (18.51/km^{2})
- Time zone: UTC-5 (EST)
  - Summer (DST): UTC-4 (EDT)
- Area code: 724
- FIPS code: 42-059-59472
- Website: greenecountypa.gov/municipality-perry-township

Perry Township is a township in Greene County, Pennsylvania, United States. The population was 1,393 at the 2020 census, down from 1,521 at the 2010 census.

== History ==
Perry Township is the location of the westernmost point surveyed as part of the Mason–Dixon line in 1767. In the early 19th century, Perry Township was part of the western frontier, and immigrant families carved farms out of the forested hills. In the late 19th century, oil and gas was discovered here, bringing considerable prosperity to many of the township's residents.

== Geography ==
Perry Township is in southern Greene County and is bordered to the south by the state of West Virginia. Mount Morris, the largest community in the township, is in the southeast in the valley of Dunkard Creek, an eastward-flowing tributary of the Monongahela River. Interstate 79 passes through the eastern side of the township, with access from Exit 1 at Mount Morris. I-79 leads south 11 miles (18 km) to Morgantown, West Virginia, and north 64 miles (103 km) to Pittsburgh.

According to the United States Census Bureau, the township has a total area of 30.2 square miles (78.3 km^{2}), of which 0.01 square miles (0.03 km^{2}), or 0.04%, are water.

== Demographics ==
Historical population
Census	Pop.	Note	%±
2000	1,720		—
2010	1,521		−11.6%
2020	1,393		−8.4%
2025 (est.)	1,331		−4.5%
U.S. Decennial Census

As of the census of 2010, there were 1,521 people, 643 households, and 464 families residing in the township. The population density was 50.2 inhabitants per square mile (19.4/km^{2}). There were 716 housing units at an average density of 23.6/sq mi (9.1/km^{2}). The racial makeup of the township was 98.9% White, 0.3% African American, 0.2% Native American, 0.1% Asian, and 0.6% from two or more races. Hispanic or Latino of any race were 0.3% of the population.

There were 643 households, out of which 28.0% had children under the age of 18 living with them, 58.6% were married couples living together, 8.7% had a female householder with no husband present, and 27.8% were non-families. 24.1% of all households were made up of individuals, and 10.7% had someone living alone who was 65 years of age or older. The average household size was 2.37 and the average family size was 2.76.

In the township the population was spread out, with 20.4% under the age of 18, 6.3% from 18 to 24, 25.4% from 25 to 44, 30.0% from 45 to 64, and 17.9% who were 65 years of age or older. The median age was 43.8 years. For every 100 females there were 101.6 males. For every 100 females age 18 and over, there were 98.8 males.

For the period 2011–2015, the estimated median annual income for a household in the township was $52,167, and the median income for a family was $63,594. Male full-time workers had a median income of $48,036 versus $38,618 for females. The per capita income for the township was $26,776. About 5.0% of families and 7.8% of the population were below the poverty line, including 9.4% of those under age 18 and 5.4% of those age 65 or over.
