= Dunkard Creek =

Stream in Pennsylvania, USA

Dunkard Creek Tributary to Monongahela River
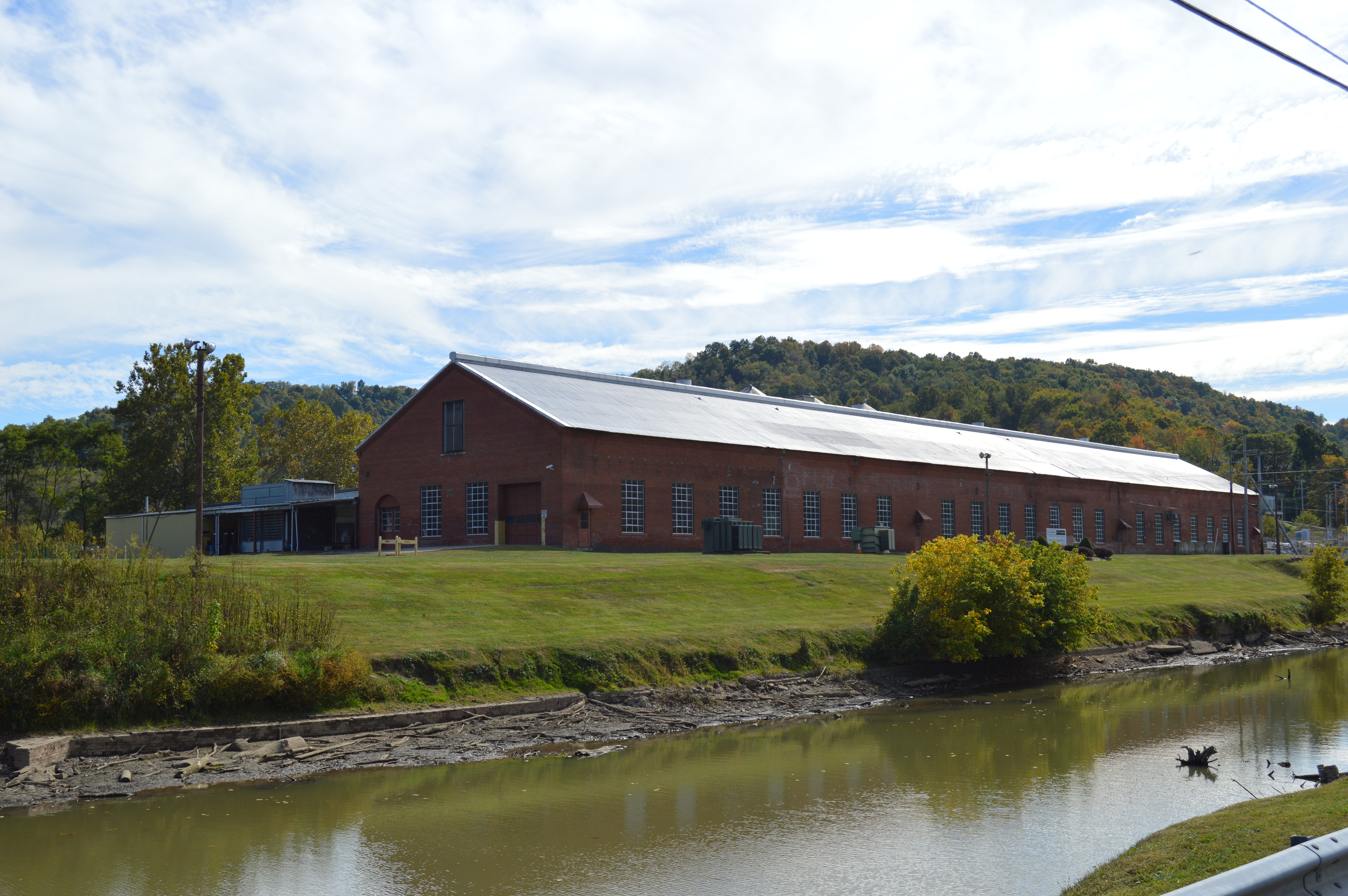
- Along the creek at Brave, Pennsylvania.

- Location of Dunkard Creek mouth Dunkard Creek (the United States)

Location
- Country: United States
- State: Pennsylvania
- County: Greene

Physical characteristics
- Source: confluence of Pennsylvania Fork Dunkard Creek and White Creek
  - location: Hero, Pennsylvania
  - coordinates: 39°43′17″N 080°16′13″W
  - elevation: 1,018 ft (310 m)
- Mouth: Monongahela River
  - location: about 0.25 miles east-southeast of Poland Mines, Pennsylvania
  - coordinates: 39°45′53″N 079°56′10″W
  - elevation: 778 ft (237 m)
- Length: 42.3 mi (68.1 km)
- Basin size: 233.09 square miles (603.7 km^{2})
- Discharge
  - location: Monongahela River
  - average: 299.26 cu ft/s (8.474 m^{3}/s) at mouth with Monongahela River

Basin features
- Progression: generally east
- River system: Monongahela River
- Tributaries
  - left: Pennsylvania Fork Dunkard Creek, Garrison Fork, Clawson Run, Toms Run, Hoovers Run, Morris Run, Wrights Run, Roberts Run, Rudolf Run, Hackleberry Run, Blacks Run, Ripleys Run, Shannon Run, Bacon Run, Hobbs Run, Calvin Run, Glade Run, Meadow Run, Rocky Hollow
  - right: White Creek, Pumpkin Run, West Virginia Fork Dunkard Creek, Miracle Run, Cowells Run, Kings Run, Coopers Run, Days Run, Jakes Run, Dolls Run, Dooley Run
- Bridges: Pumpkin Run Road, Mine Road, Chestnut Street, Cliff Road, WV 7 (x4), WV 39 (x2), Hobbs Run Road, US 19, I-79, Gas Company Road, Bald Hill Church Road, Old Water Works Road, Plant Road, Bobtown Highway, Bobtown Road, PA 88

Dunkard Creek is a stream that flows 36.9 miles (59.4 km) through Greene County, Pennsylvania and Monongalia County, West Virginia, near the towns of Mount Morris, Pennsylvania, and Blacksville, West Virginia. It flows into the Monongahela River northwest of Point Marion, Pennsylvania, approximately three miles north of the Pennsylvania-West Virginia border.

Mason-Dixon Historical Park is located on the banks of Dunkard Creek in an area where the creek crosses the border three times in less than one mile. The park grounds include Brown's Hill, the westernmost site from which Charles Mason and Jeremiah Dixon made astronomical observations during the original survey of the Pennsylvania–Maryland border in 1767.

The creek is named for members of the Dunkard Brethren, a pacifist, nonconformist group of Christians who settled in the region during the 18th century and practiced baptism by immersion. The Pennsylvania German word for "immerse" is dunke and people who immerse are called dunker.

In September 2009, Dunkard Creek suffered a massive fish kill resulting in the death of more than 160 species of fish, salamanders and endangered mussels in the creek. The West Virginia Department of Environmental Protection determined that an algal bloom was responsible for the loss. The bloom is believed to have been possible as a result of high chloride and salt levels in the water. A Consol Energy mine discharge site on the creek is the likeliest source of contamination. The Shannopin Mine in the Bobtown area of Dunkard Township also discharges into Dunkard Creek. Since at least 2002, the West Virginia DEP had known about and been pressured by environmental groups to take action on high levels of chlorides and other contaminants in the Blacksville No. 2 outfall, but they took no action against Consol.

In March 2011, Consol Energy reached an agreement with the US EPA and the State of West Virginia regarding damage done to Dunkard Creek caused by high levels of TDS in the discharge from their Blacksville No. 2 mine. As part of that settlement, Consol agreed to pay $5.5 million in civil penalties for pollution violations related to the 2009 fish kill. The settlement also describes requirements for Consol to complete a new, $200 million water treatment system to better control pollution discharges from its active and former mining operations in the area.

In July 2015, Consol Energy reached a settlement with the PA Fish and Boat Commission, agreeing to pay $2.5 million for the damages to the Pennsylvania portion of Dunkard Creek. The commission plans to use this money to restore the fish population in the creek and support recreational fishing and boating projects.

== Mathews restoration site ==
Dunkard Creek drains a rural 235-square-mile (610 km^{2}) watershed within nine townships in Greene County, Pennsylvania, and three districts in Monongalia County, West Virginia. The river is classified as a warm water fishery and historically supports a variety of fish, including smallmouth bass, sunfish, and muskellunge in all but the lower 6.2 miles (10.0 km) (from Taylortown to Poland Mines, Pennsylvania), which have been devastated by decades of unchecked acid mine drainage (AMD).

In 2007, thanks to the support of an EPA Targeted Watersheds Grant, the Greene County Watershed Alliance and the Friends of Dunkard Creek sought to reclaim part of the lower 6.2 miles (10.0 km) by creating a passive treatment system, or constructed wetlands, on the Mathews farm near Poland Mines. At this site, the abandoned Maiden #1 mine dumped over a million gallons of untreated AMD into Dunkard Creek each day.

Working with Stream Restoration, Inc. and public/private partners from across the region, the Alliance created a passive treatment system consisting of:

1. An aerobic wetland (shallow water flowing over vegetation). Once established, an aerobic wetland produces large amounts of organic debris. The debris encourages anaerobic bacteria, which can revert sulfate ions into sulfide ions. Sulfide ions can then bind with heavy metal ions (such as iron) to remove them from the water.

2. Limestone ponds and channels. (Limestone, because of its high calcite content, reduces the acidity of AMD naturally.) When combined with man-made wetlands, it creates a self-renewing passive treatment system.

In all, close to 12,000 tons of limestone were used at the Mathews Restoration Site. Volunteers started more than 2,000 plantings from 34 different species of plants, trees and shrubs. The combination of plantings and engineered flow ponds and channels is an example of how man and nature can work together to reclaim an area from AMD.

== See also ==
- List of rivers of Pennsylvania
- List of rivers of West Virginia
- Wadestown Covered Bridge
