= Wadestown =

Wadestown may also refer to:

- Wadestown, West Virginia, an unincorporated community in the United States
- Wadestown, New Zealand, a suburb in Wellington, New Zealand
