= High Point Raceway =

Motocross track near Mount Morris, Pennsylvania, USA

Coordinates: 39.7346°N 80.0071°W

"The Country Club of Motocross"
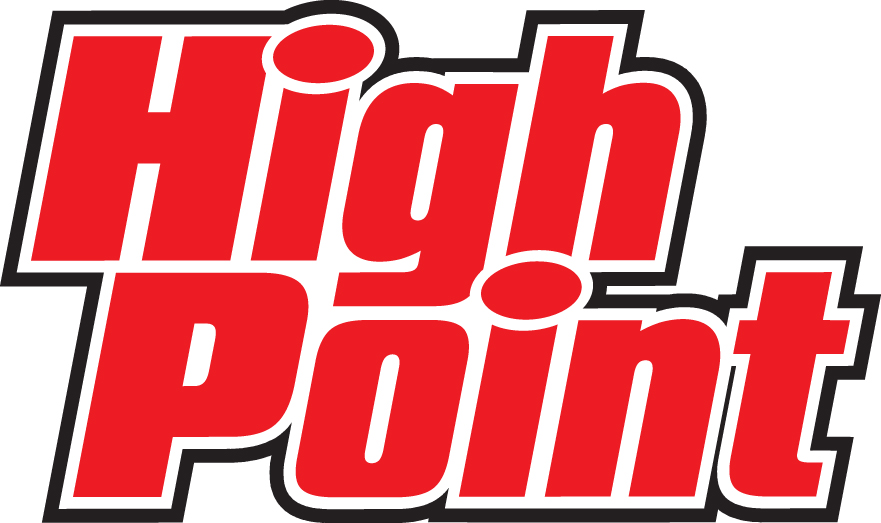
- Location: 281 Taylortown Road Mount Morris, Pennsylvania 15349
- Owner: Holbert Family
- Operator: Racer Productions, Inc
- Broke ground: 1976
- Opened: 1977
- Architect: Dave Coombs
- Major events: Lucas Oil Pro Motocross Championship GNCC Racing DC Vet Homecoming
- Website: HighPointMX.com

Pro Track
- Surface: Clay
- Length: 1.2 mi (1.9 km)
- Turns: 18

Amateur Track
- Surface: Clay
- Length: 1.0 mi (1.6 km)
- Turns: 15

High Point Raceway is a motocross track which is located near Mount Morris, Pennsylvania. The High Point Pro Motocross National, hosted each June, has been a tradition in the region since the track's addition to the Lucas Oil Pro Motocross Championship in 1977.

The facility also hosts a round of the Grand National Cross Country Series, the ATV Motocross National Championship and the DC Vet Homecoming each year, as well as local motocross events.

== High Point History ==
In late 1976, brothers Jack and Carol Holbert reached out to race promoter Dave Coombs with the hopes of building a motocross track on their family farm. Coombs would break ground on the track and undergo later renovations after the Maico Factory Racing team visited the facility and gave their feedback. From there, their basic layout has remained the same over the years with only changes coming within the existing facility. The track has hosted a round of the Lucas Oil Pro Motocross Championship each year since opening in 1977. Additionally, the facility hosted the first-ever AMA National Hare Scramble in 1979 and would see a round of the Grand National Cross Country Series from 1987 until 2002. In 2018, GNCC Racing returned to High Point Raceway as a section of the Mason-Dixon GNCC based out of the adjoining Mathews Farm property.

The name High Point originated from a planned sponsorship with John Penton's Hi Point Products. The sponsorship fell through before finalization, even though signs were already made. The additional letters were added and the High Point Raceway name has remained ever since.

== Past Pro Motocross Winners ==
Since the inaugural event in 1977, the High Point National has been visited by some of the world's top motocross racers and many have logged class wins at the event.

=== 450 Class ===
Year	Rider	Hometown	Machine
2024	Jett Lawrence	Landsborough, Australia	Honda
2023	Jett Lawrence	Landsborough, Australia	Honda
2022	Eli Tomac	Cortez, CO	Yamaha
2021	Dylan Ferrandis	France	Yamaha
2020	NO EVENT		
2019	Eli Tomac	Cortez, CO	Kawasaki
2018	Eli Tomac	Cortez, CO	Kawasaki
2017	Blake Baggett	Grand Terrace, CA	KTM
2016	Ken Roczen	Germany	Suzuki
2015	Ken Roczen	Germany	Suzuki
2014	James Stewart	Haines City, FL	Suzuki
2013	Ryan Villopoto	Poulsbo, WA	Kawasaki
2012	Ryan Dungey	Belle Plaine, MN	KTM
2011	Ryan Villopoto	Poulsbo, WA	Kawasaki
2010	Ryan Dungey	Belle Plaine, MN	Suzuki
2009	Chad Reed	Australia	Suzuki
2008	James Stewart	Haines City, FL	Kawasaki
2007	Ricky Carmichael	Havana, FL	Suzuki
2006	Ricky Carmichael	Havana, FL	Suzuki
2005	Ricky Carmichael	Havana, FL	Suzuki
2004	Ricky Carmichael	Havana, FL	Honda
2003	Ricky Carmichael	Havana, FL	Honda
2002	Ricky Carmichael	Havana, FL	Honda
2001	David Vuillemin	France	Yamaha
2000	David Vuillemin	France	Yamaha
1999	Greg Albertyn	South Africa	Suzuki
1998	Ezra Lusk	Bainbridge, GA	Honda
1997	Damon Bradshaw	Mooresville, NC	Honda
1996	Jeff Emig	Kansas City, KS	Kawasaki
1995	Doug Henry	Oxford, CT	Yamaha
1994	Mike Kiedrowski	Canyon Country, CA	Kawasaki
1993	Damon Bradshaw	Mooresville, NC	Yamaha
1992	Damon Bradshaw	Mooresville, NC	Yamaha
1991	Jeff Stanton	Sherwood, MI	Honda
1990	Damon Bradshaw	Mooresville, NC	Yamaha
1989	Jeff Stanton	Sherwood, MI	Honda
1988	Rick Johnson	El Cajon, CA	Honda
1987	Ron Lechien	El Cajon, CA	Kawasaki
1986	Rick Johnson	El Cajon, CA	Honda
1985	Jeff Ward	San Juan Capistrano, CA	Kawasaki
1984	Rick Johnson	El Cajon, CA	Yamaha
1983	Bob Hannah	Whittier, CA	Honda
1982	Rick Johnson	El Cajon, CA	Yamaha
1981	Kent Howerton	San Antonio, TX	Suzuki
1980	Kent Howerton	San Antonio, TX	Suzuki
1979	Kent Howerton	San Antonio, TX	Suzuki
1978	Jim Ellis	E. Hampton, CT	Honda
1977	Tony DiStefano	Morrisville, PA	Suzuki

=== 250 Class ===
Year	Rider	Hometown	Machine
2024	Ty Masterpool	Paradise, TX	Kawasaki
2023	Hunter Lawrence	Landsborough, Australia	Honda
2022	Jett Lawrence	Landsborough, Australia	Honda
2021	Jalek Swoll	Beleview, FL	Husqvarna
2020	NO EVENT		
2019	Adam Cianciarulo	Clermont, FL	Kawasaki
2018	Aaron Plessinger	Hamilton, OH	Yamaha
2017	Jeremy Martin	Millville, MN	Honda
2016	Joey Savatgy	Thomasville, GA	Kawasaki
2015	Marvin Musquin	France	KTM
2014	Blake Baggett	Grand Terrace, CA	Kawasaki
2013	Marvin Musquin	France	KTM
2012	Eli Tomac	Cortez, CO	Honda
2011	Blake Baggett	Grand Terrace, CA	Kawasaki
2010	Tyla Rattray	South Africa	Kawasaki
2009	Christophe Pourcel	France	Kawasaki
2008	Ryan Villopoto	Poulsbo, WA	Kawasaki
2007	Joshua Grant	Riverside, CA	Honda
2006	Ryan Villopoto	Poulsbo, WA	Kawasaki
2005	Mike Alessi	Victorville, CA	KTM
2004	James Stewart	Haines City, FL	Kawasaki
2003	Michael Brown	Johnson City, TN	Kawasaki
2002	Chad Reed	Australia	Yamaha
2001	Travis Pastrana	Annapolis, MD	Suzuki
2000	Kelly Smith	Ludington, MI	KTM
1999	Ricky Carmichael	Havana, FL	Kawasaki
1998	Ricky Carmichael	Havana, FL	Kawasaki
1997	Scott Sheak	Germantown, NY	Honda
1996	Kevin Windham	Baton Rouge, LA	Kawasaki
1995	Tim Ferry	Largo, FL	Suzuki
1994	Doug Henry	Oxford, CT	Honda
1993	Jeff Emig	Kansas City, KS	Yamaha
1992	Mike LaRocco	South Bend, IN	Kawasaki
1991	Brian Swink	Fenton, MI	Honda
1990	Jean-Michel Bayle	France	Honda
1989	George Holland	Kerman, CA	Honda
1988	Guy Cooper	Stillwater, OK	Suzuki
1987	Micky Dymond	Yorba Linda, CA	Honda
1986	Micky Dymond	Yorba Linda, CA	Honda
1985	Erik Kehoe	Granada Hills, CA	Suzuki
1984	Jeff Ward	San Juan Capistrano, CA	Kawasaki
1983	Mark Barnett	Bridgeview, IL	Suzuki

=== 500 Class ===
Year	Rider	Hometown	Brand
1985	David Bailey	Axton, VA	Honda
1984	David Bailey	Axton, VA	Honda
1983	Danny Chandler	Foresthill, CA	Honda
1982	Darrell Shultz	Trinidad, CA	Honda
1981	Broc Glover	El Cajon, CA	Yamaha
1980	Chuck Sun	Sherwood, OR	Honda
1979	Gaylon Mosier	Huntington Beach, CA	Kawasaki
1978	Rick Burgett	Sandy, OR	Yamaha

== GNCC Overall Winners ==
Originating as the first-ever AMA National Hare Scramble, High Point Raceway has hosted a total of 18 Grand National Cross Country Series events. After the 1979 event, the venue would not be visited again for a cross country event until being added to the GNCC schedule in 1987 and remained a part of the series until 2002. In 2020, the series would return to High Point for a special event based out of the adjacent Mathews Farm property, traditionally home to the Mason-Dixon GNCC.

=== GNCC Bike Overall Winners ===
Year	Rider	Hometown	Brand
2020	Kailub Russell	Boonville, NC	KTM
2002	Barry Hawk	Smithfield, PA	Yamaha
2001	Fred Andrews	Salem, OH	Kawasaki
2000	Steve Hatch	Scottsdale, AZ	Suzuki
1999	Fred Andrews	Salem, OH	Kawasaki
1998	Steve Hatch	Scottsdale, AZ	Suzuki
1997	Scott Summers	Petersburg, KY	Honda
1996	Scott Plessinger	Hamilton, OH	KTM
1995	Scott Summers	Petersburg, KY	Honda
1994	Scott Plessinger	Hamilton, OH	KTM
1993	Fred Andrews	Salem, OH	Yamaha
1992	Scott Summers	Petersburg, KY	Honda
1991	Scott Summers	Petersburg, KY	Honda
1990	Tim Shephard	Lancaster, OH	Yamaha
1989	Scott Summers	Petersburg, KY	Honda
1988	Scott Summers	Petersburg, KY	Honda
1987	Sammy Bosnic	Weirton, WV	Suzuki
1979	Denny Swartz	Marietta, OH	Maico

=== GNCC ATV Overall Winners ===
Year	Rider	Hometown	Brand
2020	Cole Richardson	Edinburg, PA	Yamaha
2002	Bill Ballance	Oakland, KY	Roll Design
2001	Bradley Page	Mt. Herman, KY	Roll Design
2000	Bill Ballance	Oakland, KY	Roll Design
1999	Bill Ballance	Oakland, KY	Roll Design
1998	Bill Ballance	Oakland, KY	Roll Design
1997	Jeff Seegot	Burton, OH	Honda
1996	Barry Hawk	Smithfield, PA	Laegers
1995	Barry Hawk	Smithfield, PA	Laegers
1994	Barry Hawk	Smithfield, PA	Laegers
1993	Bob Sloan	Martinsville, IN	Honda
1992	Bob Sloan	Martinsville, IN	Honda
1991	Chuck Delullo	St Marys, PA	Honda
1990	Bob Sloan	Martinsville, IN	Honda
1989	Bob Sloan	Martinsville, IN	Honda
1988	Chuck Delullo	St Marys, PA	Honda
1987	Tom Tokay	Pittsburgh, PA	Honda

== ATV Motocross Past Winners ==
High Point Raceway has been a frequent stop on the ATV Motocross National Championship schedule for many years, often swapping years with other venues in the area. Not all past results are currently available.

Year	Rider	Hometown	Brand
2021	Joel Hetrick	Seneca, PA	Honda
2018	Joel Hetrick	Seneca, PA	Honda
2016	Joel Hetrick	Seneca, PA	Honda
2015	Joel Hetrick	Seneca, PA	Honda
2014	Joel Hetrick	Seneca, PA	Can-Am
2012	John Natalie	Warriors Mark, PA	Can-Am
2008	Joe Byrd	Union City, TN	Honda
2007	Jeremy Lawson	Battletown, KY	Honda
