= Grand National Cross Country =

American motorcycle racing series

Grand National Cross Country Series
- Jurisdiction: United States
- Abbreviation: GNCC
- Founded: 1975
- Headquarters: Morgantown, West Virginia

Official website
- www.gnccracing.com

The Grand National Cross Country Series is an American motorcycle racing series. The off-road race series was founded by Dave Coombs in 1975 and is sanctioned by the American Motorcyclist Association (AMA). The competition is similar to motocross but, instead of using an enclosed race track, it features extended cross-country, off-road courses of 8 to 12 miles in length and competitions lasting up to 3 hours. GNCC races are physically demanding, leading as many as 2,200 riders through tracks ranging from woods, to hills, mud, rocks, roots, motocross track sections and more. The series has classes for off-road motorcycles, ATV and eMTB vehicles. GNCC Racing is open to both professional and amateur racers in a variety of skill level and age classes. The current presenting sponsor is Specialized Bicycle Components.

== GNCC Events ==
=== 2025 ===
Round	Event	Venue	Location	Date
1	Big Buck GNCC	Big Buck Farm	Union, SC	15-16 February
2	Wild Boar GNCC	Rodman Plantation	Palatka, FL	1-2 March
3	Talladega GNCC	Talladega Superspeedway	Talladega, AL	8-9 March
4	Camp Coker Bullet GNCC	Moree's Sportsman's Preserve	Society Hill, SC	29-30 March
5	The Old Gray	The Old Gray	Monterey, TN	11-13 April
6	Powerline Park	Powerline Park	St Clairsville, OH	3-4 May
7	Hoosier GNCC	Ironman Raceway	Crawfordsville, IN	16-18 May
8	Mason-Dixon GNCC	Mathews Farm/High Point Raceway	Mount Morris, PA	30 May - 1 June
9	Snowshoe GNCC	Snowshoe Mountain	Snowshoe, WV	20-22 June
10	Buckwheat 100 GNCC	CJ Raceway	Newburg, WV	5-7 September
11	The Mountaineer GNCC	The Summit Bechtel Family National Scout Reserve	Beckley, WV	19-21 September
12	The John Penton GNCC	Sunday Creek Raceway	Millfield, Ohio	10-12 October
13	Ironman GNCC	Ironman Raceway	Crawfordsville, IN	24-26 October

== GNCC History ==
The series began in 1975 when Dave Coombs was contacted by a preacher from a church in a small West Virginia town. The preacher wanted to help the economy of his struggling town by hosting a motorcycle race. Dave Coombs saw major potential in the land and thought that a grand prix style race through the town and surrounding country side would be special enough to bring visitors to the town.

Coombs named this race the Blackwater 100. The name "Blackwater" originated from nearby Blackwater Falls and the Blackwater River, while 100 for the number of miles in the race. The land was rugged, which would make the race itself one would be difficult for riders and their machines. The race became popular when Dave invited a group of magazine editors from California, who went back and wrote about their experiences with the rugged race. Eventually, Blackwater would become known as "America's Toughest Race".

Dave also promoted the first ever AMA National Hare Scramble, which was held at High Point Raceway in 1979. With the popularity of this event and the Blackwater, the Wiseco 100 Miler Series was born. The series would then evolve into the GNCC series beginning with the 1984 season. The GNCC series began experiencing more growth when three-wheelers were added in 1983, and four-wheelers replaced them a few years later. Blackwater 100 later received an eponymous pinball adaptation manufactured by Bally-Midway in 1988, distinguished by its complex table design and its unique rule of making each of the three "balls" allotted per session multiballs that represent three "heats" of the race.

The famous Blackwater 100 was shut down after the 1993 event, but by this point the GNCC series had earned the reputation as being the Premier Offroad Racing Series in America. Throughout the 90s the series would still grow more and more. With domination on the bike side by riders such as Scott Summers, Scott Plessinger and Rodney Smith, while Barry Hawk dominated the ATV side, the series gained even more mainstream coverage in various media. The series patriarch, Dave Coombs, died in 1998 but Big Dave's family stepped up to continue the success of the series. His son-in-law, Jeff Russell, the 1991 AMA National Enduro Champion, is today's GNCC Trail Boss.

GNCC Racing has evolved from small, regional races to professional-grade events that attract professional and amateur riders from across the world. Growth in the professional ranks prompted the changes from one single "Pro" class to multiple professional rank classes beginning in 2007. Professional ATV classes consist of the premier "XC1 Pro ATV" class and the "XC2 Pro-Am ATV" class to serve as a stepping stone for riders moving out of the amateur classes. Professional motorcycle classes consist of the "XC1 Open Pro" class for any size motorcycle, the "XC2 250 Pro" class for 250cc motorcycles and the "XC2 125 Pro-Am" class reserved exclusively for 125cc 2-stroke motorcycles.

== Past Champions ==
Over the years the series has been contested by thousands of different riders across the world. Each year an Overall Champion is crowned for both the bikes and ATVs.

=== GNCC Overall Bike Champions ===
Year	Rider	Hometown	Brand
2025	Ben Kelley	Harwinton, CT	KTM
2024	Johnny Girroir	Southwick, MA	KTM
2023	Craig DeLong	Morgantown, PA	Husqvarna
2022	Jordan Ashburn	Livingston, TN	Husqvarna
2021	Ben Kelley	Harwinton, CT	KTM
2020	Kailub Russell	Boonville, NC	KTM
2019	Kailub Russell	Boonville, NC	KTM
2018	Kailub Russell	Boonville, NC	KTM
2017	Kailub Russell	Boonville, NC	KTM
2016	Kailub Russell	Boonville, NC	KTM
2015	Kailub Russell	Boonville, NC	KTM
2014	Kailub Russell	Boonville, NC	KTM
2013	Kailub Russell	Boonville, NC	KTM
2012	Paul Whibley	Dannevirke, New Zealand	Yamaha
2011	Charlie Mullins	Hamilton, OH	KTM
2010	Josh Strang	Inverell, Australia	Suzuki
2009	Paul Whibley	Dannevirke, New Zealand	Kawasaki
2008	David Knight	Isle of Man, UK	KTM
2007	David Knight	Isle of Man, UK	KTM
2006	Juha Salminen	Vantaa, Finland	KTM
2005	Juha Salminen	Vantaa, Finland	KTM
2004	Rodney Smith	Antioch, CA	Suzuki
2003	Barry Hawk	Smithfield, PA	Yamaha
2002	Rodney Smith	Antioch, CA	Suzuki
2001	Rodney Smith	Antioch, CA	Suzuki
2000	Shane Watts	Maffra, Australia	KTM
1999	Rodney Smith	Antioch, CA	Suzuki
1998	Rodney Smith	Antioch, CA	Suzuki
1997	Scott Summers	Petersburg, KY	Honda
1996	Scott Summers	Petersburg, KY	Honda
1995	Scott Plessinger	Hamilton, OH	KTM
1994	Scott Plessinger	Hamilton, OH	KTM
1993	Fred Andrews	Salem, OH	Yamaha
1992	Scott Summers	Petersburg, KY	Honda
1991	Scott Summers	Petersburg, KY	Honda
1990	Scott Summers	Petersburg, KY	Honda
1989	Ed Lojak	Tarentum, PA	Yamaha
1988	Ed Lojak	Tarentum, PA	Husqvarna
1987	Ed Lojak	Tarentum, PA	Husqvarna
1986	Ed Lojak	Tarentum, PA	Husqvarna
1985	Jim Maltba	Mount Clare, WV	KTM
1984	Ed Lojak	Tarentum, PA	Husqvarna
1983	Ed Lojak	Tarentum, PA	Husqvarna
1982	Ed Lojak	Tarentum, PA	Husqvarna
1981	Ed Lojak	Tarentum, PA	Husqvarna
1980	Ed Lojak	Tarentum, PA	Husqvarna

=== GNCC XC2 250 Pro Class Bike Champions ===
Year	Rider	Hometown	Brand
2025	Grant Davis	Meshoppen, PA	KTM
2024	Grant Davis	Meshoppen, PA	KTM
2023	Liam Draper	New Zealand	Yamaha
2022	Lyndon Snodgrass	Australia	Kawasaki
2021	Johnny Girroir	Southwick, MA	GasGas
2020	Craig Delong	Morgantown, PA	Husqvarna
2019	Ben Kelley	Harwinton, CT	KTM
2018	Ben Kelley	Harwinton, CT	KTM
2017	Josh Toth	Winsted, CT	Yamaha
2016	Trevor Bollinger	Morganton, NC	Honda
2015	Jason Thomas	Machynlleth, Wales	KTM
2014	Grant Baylor	Belton, SC	KTM
2013	Grant Baylor	Belton, SC	KTM
2012	Jason Thomas	Machynlleth, Wales	KTM
2011	Steward Baylor	Belton, SC	KTM
2010	Kailub Russell	Kingston, OH	KTM
2009	Kailub Russell	Kingston, OH	KTM
2008	Thad Duvall	Williamstown, WV	Yamaha
2007	Justin Williamson	Sanford, FL	KTM

=== GNCC FMF XC3 125 Pro Am Class Bike Champions ===
Year	Rider	Hometown	Brand
2025	James Jenkins	House Springs, MO	Yamaha
2024	Dakoda Devore	Uhrichsville, OH	KTM
2023	Toby Cleveland	Erin, NY	Husqvarna
2022	Brody Johnson	Landrum, SC	Husqvarna
2021	Jonathan Johnson	Landrum, SC	Husqvarna
2020	Zack Hayes	Sumter, SC	KTM
2019	Jesse Ansley	Myakka City, FL	KTM
2018	Jesse Ansley	Myakka City, FL	KTM
2017	Jason Thomas	Machynlleth, Wales	Husqvarna

=== GNCC WXC Bike Champions ===
Year	Rider	Hometown	Brand
2025	Korie Steede	Beloit, OH	Husqvarna
2024	Rachael Archer	New Zealand	Kawasaki
2023	Rachael Archer	New Zealand	Yamaha
2022	Rachael Archer	New Zealand	Yamaha
2021	Becca Sheets	Circleville, OH	Yamaha
2020	Becca Sheets	Circleville, OH	Yamaha
2019	Tayla Jones	Good Hope, NSW, Australia	Husqvarna
2018	Tayla Jones	Good Hope, AUS	Husqvarna
2017	Tayla Jones	Good Hope, AUS	Husqvarna
2016	Becca Sheets	Circleville, OH	Yamaha
2015	Kacy Martinez	Sunol, CA	KTM
2014	Kacy Martinez	Sunol, CA	KTM
2013	Maria Forsberg	Brier, WA	KTM
2012	Maria Forsberg	Brier, WA	KTM
2011	Maria Forsberg	Brier, WA	KTM
2010	Maria Forsberg	Brier, WA	KTM
2009	Mandi Mastin	Whitehouse, OH	Yamaha
2008	Mandi Mastin	Whitehouse, OH	Yamaha
2007	Mandi Mastin	Whitehouse, OH	Yamaha
2006	Mandi Mastin	Whitehouse, OH	Yamaha
2005	Mandi Mastin	Whitehouse, OH	Yamaha
2004	Heather Wilson	Canyon, CA	Kawasaki
2003	Heather Wilson	Canyon, CA	Kawasaki
2002	Heather Wilson	Canyon, CA	Kawasaki

=== GNCC Overall ATV Champions ===
Year	Rider	Hometown	Brand
2025	Brycen Neal	Bidwell, OH	Yamaha
2024	Brycen Neal	Bidwell, OH	Yamaha
2023	Brycen Neal	Bidwell, OH	Yamaha
2022	Brycen Neal	Bidwell, OH	Yamaha
2021	Walker Fowler	Rogers, OH	Yamaha
2020	Walker Fowler	Rogers, OH	Yamaha
2019	Walker Fowler	Rogers, OH	Yamaha
2018	Walker Fowler	Rogers, OH	Yamaha
2017	Walker Fowler	Rogers, OH	Yamaha
2016	Walker Fowler	Rogers, OH	Yamaha
2015	Walker Fowler	Rogers, OH	Yamaha
2014	Chris Borich	Sunbury, PA	Suzuki
2013	Chris Borich	Sunbury, PA	Suzuki
2012	Chris Borich	Sunbury, PA	Suzuki
2011	Chris Borich	Sunbury, PA	Suzuki
2010	Chris Borich	Sunbury, PA	Suzuki
2009	Chris Borich	Sunbury, PA	Suzuki
2008	Bill Ballance	Oakland, KY	Yamaha
2007	Bill Ballance	Oakland, KY	Yamaha
2006	Bill Ballance	Oakland, KY	Yamaha
2005	Bill Ballance	Oakland, KY	Yamaha
2004	Bill Ballance	Oakland, KY	Yamaha
2003	Bill Ballance	Oakland, KY	LRD
2002	Bill Ballance	Oakland, KY	LRD
2001	Bill Ballance	Oakland, KY	Roll Design
2000	Bill Ballance	Oakland, KY	Roll Design
1999	Barry Hawk	Smithfield, PA	Laegers
1998	Barry Hawk	Smithfield, PA	Laegers
1997	Barry Hawk	Smithfield, PA	Laegers
1996	Barry Hawk	Smithfield, PA	Laegers
1995	Barry Hawk	Smithfield, PA	Laegers
1994	Barry Hawk	Smithfield, PA	Laegers
1993	Barry Hawk	Smithfield, PA	Laegers
1992	Bob Sloan	Martinsville, IN	Honda
1991	Chuck Delullo	St. Marys, PA	Honda
1990	Chuck Delullo	St. Marys, PA	Honda
1989	Bob Sloan	Martinsville, IN	Honda
1988	Chuck Delullo	St. Marys, PA	Honda
1987	Tom Tokay	Webster, PA	Honda
1986	Tom Tokay	Webster, PA	Honda
1985	Tom Tokay	Webster, PA	Honda
1984	Ted Trey	Frederick, MD	Honda

=== GNCC XC2 Pro Am Class ATV Champions ===
Year	Rider	Hometown	Brand
2025	Alex Thieman	Waterford, OH	Yamaha
2024	Alex Thieman	Waterford, OH	Yamaha
2023	Steven Harrell	Elkridge, MD	Yamaha
2022	Jay Shadron	Acme, PA	Yamaha
2021	Ronnie Rusch	Pittsburgh, PA	Yamaha
2020	Austin Abney	Veedersburg, IN	Honda
2019	John Glauda Jr	Waxhaw, NC	Yamaha
2018	Hunter Hart	Newfield, NY	Yamaha
2017	Devon Feehan	Windsor, NY	Honda
2016	Greg Covert	Ithaca, NY	Yamaha
2015	Cole Richardson	Edinburg, PA	Yamaha
2014	Cole Richardson	Edinburg, PA	Yamaha
2013	Brycen Neal	Bidwell, OH	Honda
2012	Patrick McQuire	Valencia, PA	Yamaha
2011	Walker Fowler	Rogers, OH	Yamaha
2010	Brian Wolf	Medina, OH	Honda
2009	Josh Kirkland	Proctor, WV	KTM
2008	Donald Ockerman	Marshall, IL	Yamaha
2007	Brandon Sommers	Millersburg, OH	Yamaha
