= North Branch Calvin Run =

Stream in Pennsylvania, USA

North Branch Calvin Run Tributary to Calvin Run
- Location of North Branch Calvin Run mouth North Branch Calvin Run (the United States)

Location
- Country: United States
- State: Pennsylvania
- County: Greene County

Physical characteristics
- Source: Whiteley Creek divide
  - location: about 2 miles southeast of Kirby, PA
  - coordinates: 39°47′21″N 080°05′16″W
  - elevation: 1,200 ft (370 m)
- Mouth: Calvin Run
  - location: about 2 miles northwest of Mount Morris, Pennsylvania
  - coordinates: 39°45′38″N 080°05′01″W
  - elevation: 955 ft (291 m)
- Length: 2.47 mi (3.98 km)
- Basin size: 1.74 square miles (4.5 km^{2})
- Discharge
  - location: Calvin Run
  - average: 2.54 cu ft/s (0.072 m^{3}/s) at mouth with Calvin Run

Basin features
- Progression: generally south
- River system: Monongahela River
- Tributaries
  - left: unnamed tributaries
  - right: unnamed tributaries
- Bridges: Stone House Road, North Branch Road (x2)

North Branch Calvin Run is a 2.47 mi (3.98 km) long first-order tributary to Calvin Run in Greene County. This is the only stream of this name in the United States.

== Course ==
North Branch Calvin Run rises about 2 miles southeast of Kirby, Pennsylvania and then flows southerly to join Calvin Run about 2 miles northwest of Mount Morris, Pennsylvania.

== Watershed ==
North Branch Calvin Run drains 1.74 square miles (4.5 km^{2}) of area, receives about 43.1 in/year of precipitation, and is about 78.8% forested.

== See also ==
- List of rivers of Pennsylvania
