= Calvin Run =

Stream in Pennsylvania, US

Calvin Run Tributary to Dunkard Creek
- Location of Calvin Run mouth Calvin Run (the United States)

Location
- Country: United States
- State: Pennsylvania
- County: Greene County

Physical characteristics
- Source: Whiteley Creek divide
  - location: about 1.25 miles south of Kirby, Pennsylvania
  - coordinates: 39°47′07″N 080°06′42″W
  - elevation: 1,180 ft (360 m)
- Mouth: Dunkard Creek
  - location: about 0.25 miles northeast of Mount Morris, Pennsylvania
  - coordinates: 39°44′41″N 080°03′41″W
  - elevation: 900 ft (270 m)
- Length: 4.18 mi (6.73 km)
- Basin size: 1.78 square miles (4.6 km^{2})
- Discharge
  - location: Dunkard Creek
  - average: 8.02 cu ft/s (0.227 m^{3}/s) at mouth with Dunkard Creek

Basin features
- Progression: generally southeast
- River system: Monongahela River
- Tributaries
  - left: North Branch Calvin Run; Watkins Run
  - right: unnamed tributaries
- Bridges: US 19, Haines Hill Road, US 19, I-79, Dooley Run Road

Calvin Run is a 1.63 mi (2.62 km) long first-order tributary to Dunkard Creek in Greene County. This is the only stream of this name in the United States.

== Course ==
Calvin Run rises about 1.25 miles south of Kirby, Pennsylvania, and then flows southeasterly to join Dunkard Creek about 0.25 miles northeast of Mount Morris, Pennsylvania.

== Watershed ==
Calvin Run drains 5.68 square miles (14.7 km^{2}) of area, receives about 43.1 in/year of precipitation, and is about 76.8% forested.

== See also ==
- List of rivers of Pennsylvania
