= Glade Run (Dunkard Creek tributary) =

Stream in Pennsylvania, USA

Glade Run Tributary to Dunkard Creek
- Location of Glade Run mouth Glade Run (Dunkard Creek tributary) (the United States)

Location
- Country: United States
- State: Pennsylvania
- County: Greene County

Physical characteristics
- Source: North Branch divide
  - location: about 2.6 miles north of Mount Morris, Pennsylvania
  - coordinates: 39°46′29″N 080°04′03″W
  - elevation: 1,380 ft (420 m)
- Mouth: Dunkard Creek
  - location: about 1.5 miles northeast of Mount Morris, Pennsylvania
  - coordinates: 39°45′07″N 080°02′32″W
  - elevation: 873 ft (266 m)
- Length: 1.63 mi (2.62 km)
- Basin size: 1.51 square miles (3.9 km^{2})
- Discharge
  - location: Dunkard Creek
  - average: 2.20 cu ft/s (0.062 m^{3}/s) at mouth with Dunkard Creek

Basin features
- Progression: generally southeast
- River system: Monongahela River
- Tributaries
  - left: unnamed tributaries
  - right: unnamed tributaries
- Bridges: Davistown Road, Gas Company Road

Glade Run is a 1.63 mi (2.62 km) long first-order tributary to Dunkard Creek in Greene County.

== Course ==
Glade Run rises about 2.6 miles north of Mount Morris, Pennsylvania, and then flows southeasterly to join Dunkard Creek about 1.5 miles northeast of Mount Morris, Pennsylvania.

== Watershed ==
Glade Run drains 1.51 square miles (3.9 km^{2}) of area, receives about 43.2 in/year of precipitation, and is about 86.5% forested.

== See also ==
- List of rivers of Pennsylvania
