= Meadow Run (Dunkard Creek tributary) =

Stream in Pennsylvania, USA

Meadow Run Tributary to Dunkard Creek
- Location of Meadow Run mouth Meadow Run (Dunkard Creek tributary) (the United States)

Location
- Country: United States
- State: Pennsylvania
- County: Greene County

Physical characteristics
- Source: North Branch divide
  - location: about 2.5 miles southeast of Kirby, Pennsylvania
  - coordinates: 39°47′22″N 080°04′31″W
  - elevation: 1,180 ft (360 m)
- Mouth: Dunkard Creek
  - location: about 1 mile southeast of Davistown, Pennsylvania
  - coordinates: 39°45′20″N 080°00′45″W
  - elevation: 866 ft (264 m)
- Length: 2.59 mi (4.17 km)
- Basin size: 7.78 square miles (20.2 km^{2})
- Discharge
  - location: Dunkard Creek
  - average: 10.86 cu ft/s (0.308 m^{3}/s) at mouth with Dunkard Creek

Basin features
- Progression: generally southeast
- River system: Monongahela River
- Tributaries
  - left: Roberts Run
  - right: Bell Run
- Bridges: Meadow Run Road, Hunters Ridge, Bunner Hill Road (x2), Steel Hill Road

Meadow Run is a 2.59 mi (4.17 km) long second-order tributary to Dunkard Creek in Greene County.

== Course ==
Meadow Run rises about 2.5 miles southeast of Kirby, Pennsylvania and then flows southeasterly to join Dunkard Creek about 1 mile southeast of Davistown, Pennsylvania.

== Watershed ==
Meadow Run drains 7.78 square miles (20.2 km^{2}) of area, receives about 43.2 in/year of precipitation, and is about 86.1% forested.

== See also ==
- List of rivers of Pennsylvania
