= Wadestown, West Virginia =

- Unincorporated community
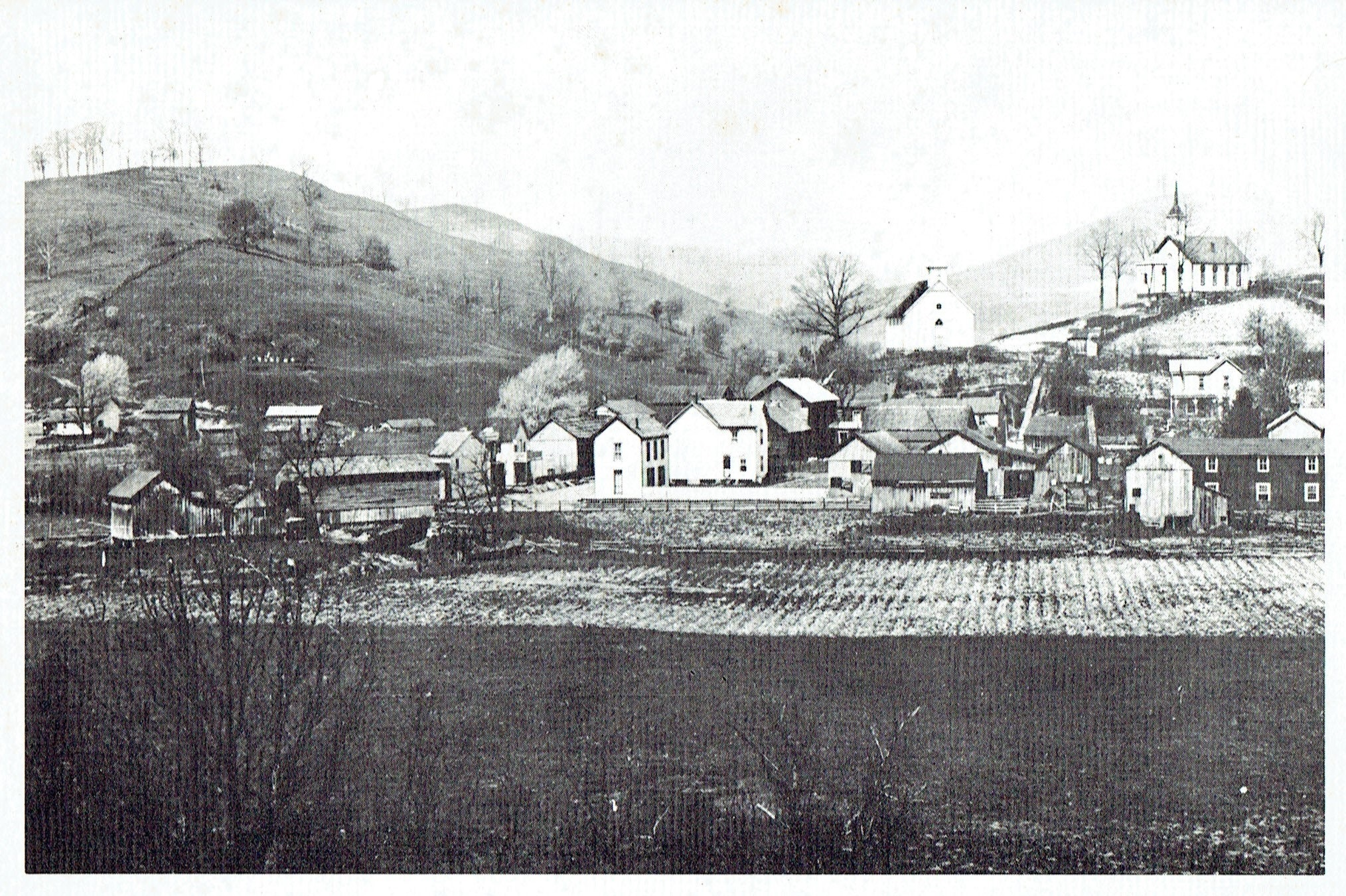
- Wadestown circa 1900

- Location within West Virginia Location within the United States
- Coordinates: 39°40′31″N 80°20′17″W
- Country: United States
- State: West Virginia
- County: Monongalia
- Elevation: 1,024 ft (312 m)
- Time zone: UTC-5 (Eastern (EST))
  - Summer (DST): UTC-4 (EDT)
- Area codes: 304 & 681
- GNIS feature ID: 1548701

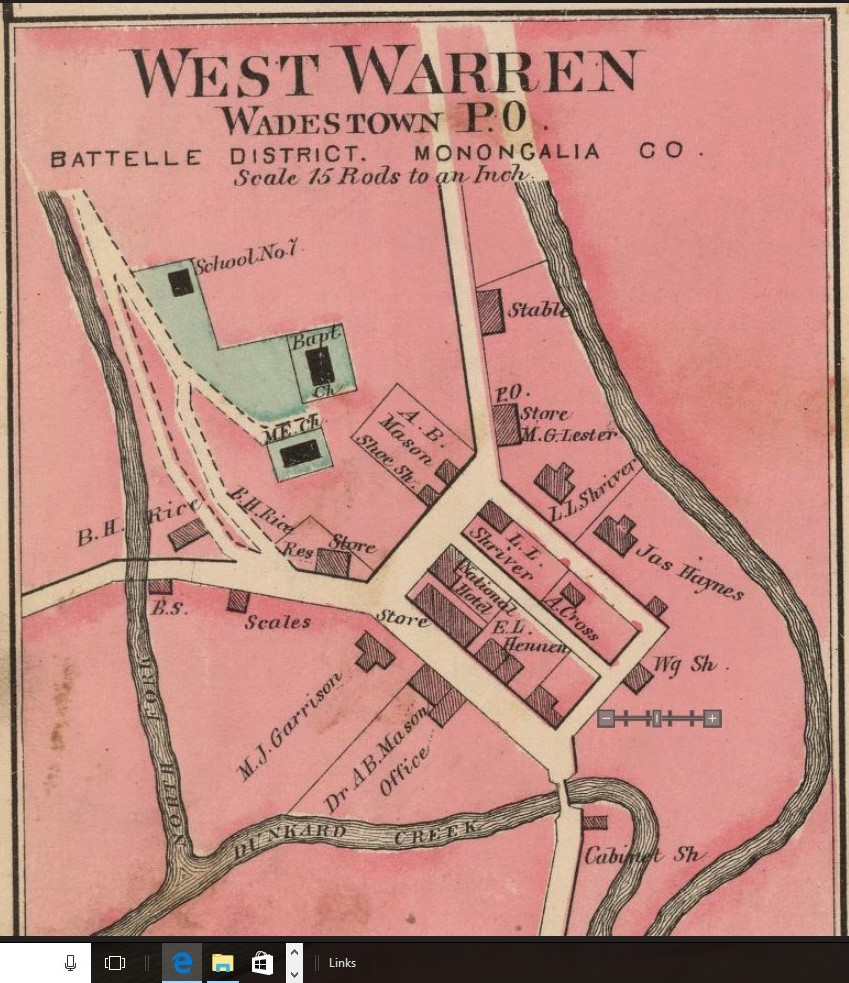
Inset of 1886 map: West Warren (Wadestown)

Wadestown — formerly West Warren — is an unincorporated community in Monongalia County, West Virginia, United States, on West Virginia Route 7 approximately 7.5 miles (12.1 km) west-southwest of Blacksville.

== Geography ==
Wadestown is situated in a bottomland where four streams converge: Range Run, the West Virginia Branch of Dunkard Creek, and the North and South Forks of the second named stream. In fact, the North and South Forks converge about 1000 feet before joining the WVBDC, and the downstream stretch is not normally given a separate name on maps. At one time, there were two covered bridges in Wadestown; one spanning the North Fork and one spanning the unnamed stretch. A sharp ridge juts into Wadestown from the north and two prominent buildings — the West Warren Baptist Church (organized 1854) and the Wadestown Methodist Church (organized 1842, built 1854) — once looked down upon the village from there. Both churches have since relocated and the heights are now occupied by the large Wadestown Cemetery with its more than 1,100 interments.

== History ==
Wadestown was first called West Warren. It became Wadestown sometime after 1825 when Thomas B. Wade (1787–1869) — a locally prominent physician, farmer, and landowner — bought 232 acres of land from his brother Elisha Wade (1795–1843) on the Left Fork of Dunkard Creek for 100 dollars. He sold many at least 12 lots from this land. The Bank of Wadestown and the store building where Morris J. Garrison kept store for many years are both located on lots originally laid out by Thomas Wade.

== See also ==
- Wadestown Covered Bridge
