= Bobtown, Pennsylvania =

Unincorporated community in Pennsylvania, US

- Census-designated place
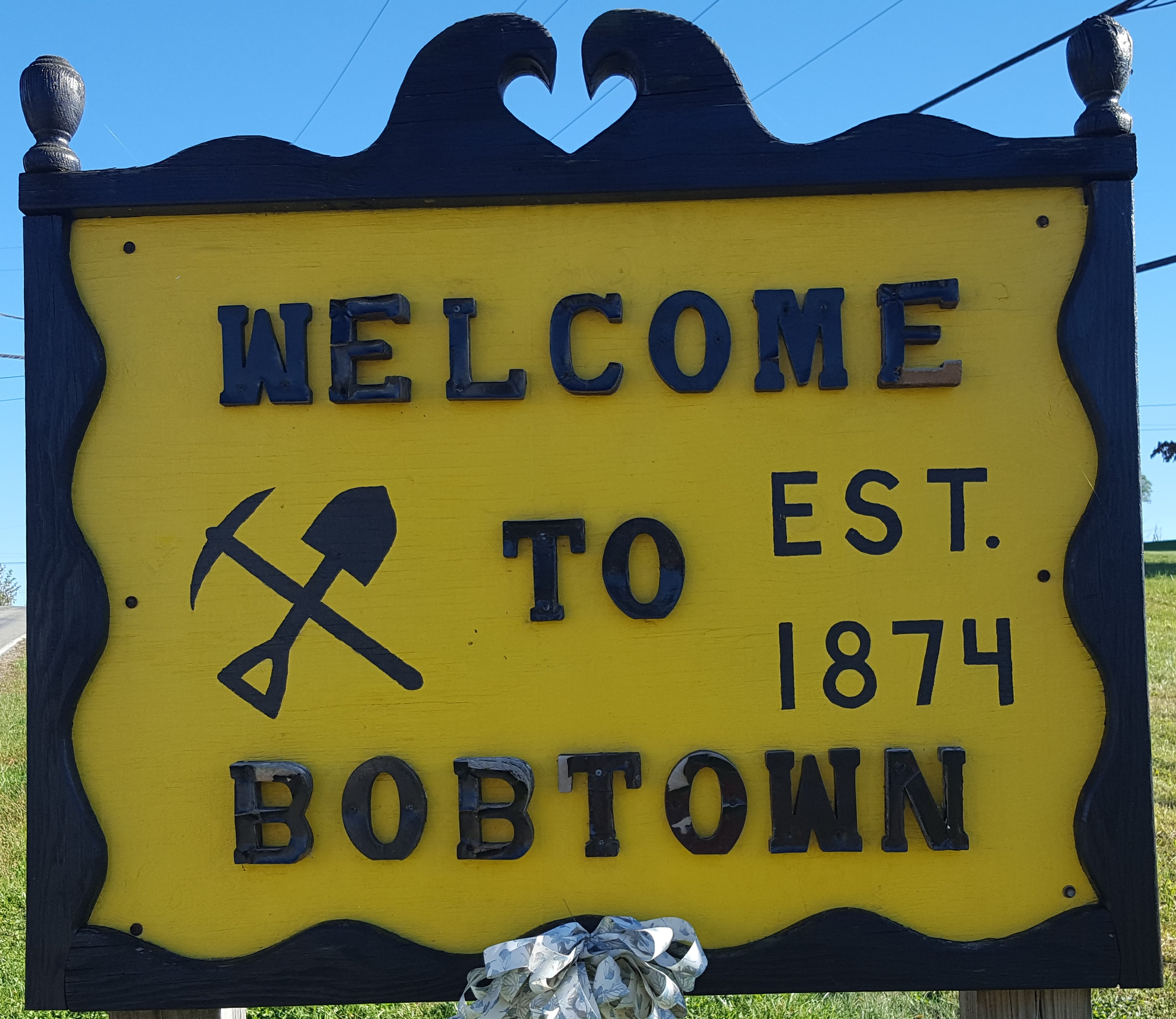

- Location within Pennsylvania Location within the United States
- Coordinates: 39°45′40″N 79°58′53″W
- Country: United States
- State: Pennsylvania
- County: Greene
- Township: Dunkard

Area
  - Total: 0.61 sq mi (1.59 km^{2})
  - Land: 0.61 sq mi (1.59 km^{2})
  - Water: 0 sq mi (0.00 km^{2})
- Elevation: 1,178 ft (359 m)

Population (2020)
  - Total: 701
  - Density: 1,138.3/sq mi (439.51/km^{2})
- Time zone: UTC-5 (Eastern (EST))
  - Summer (DST): UTC-4 (EDT)
- ZIP code: 15315
- Area code: 724
- FIPS code: 42-07384
- GNIS feature ID: 1169928

Bobtown is an unincorporated coal town and census-designated place (CDP) in Greene County, Pennsylvania, United States. As of the 2010 census it had a population of 757.

== History ==
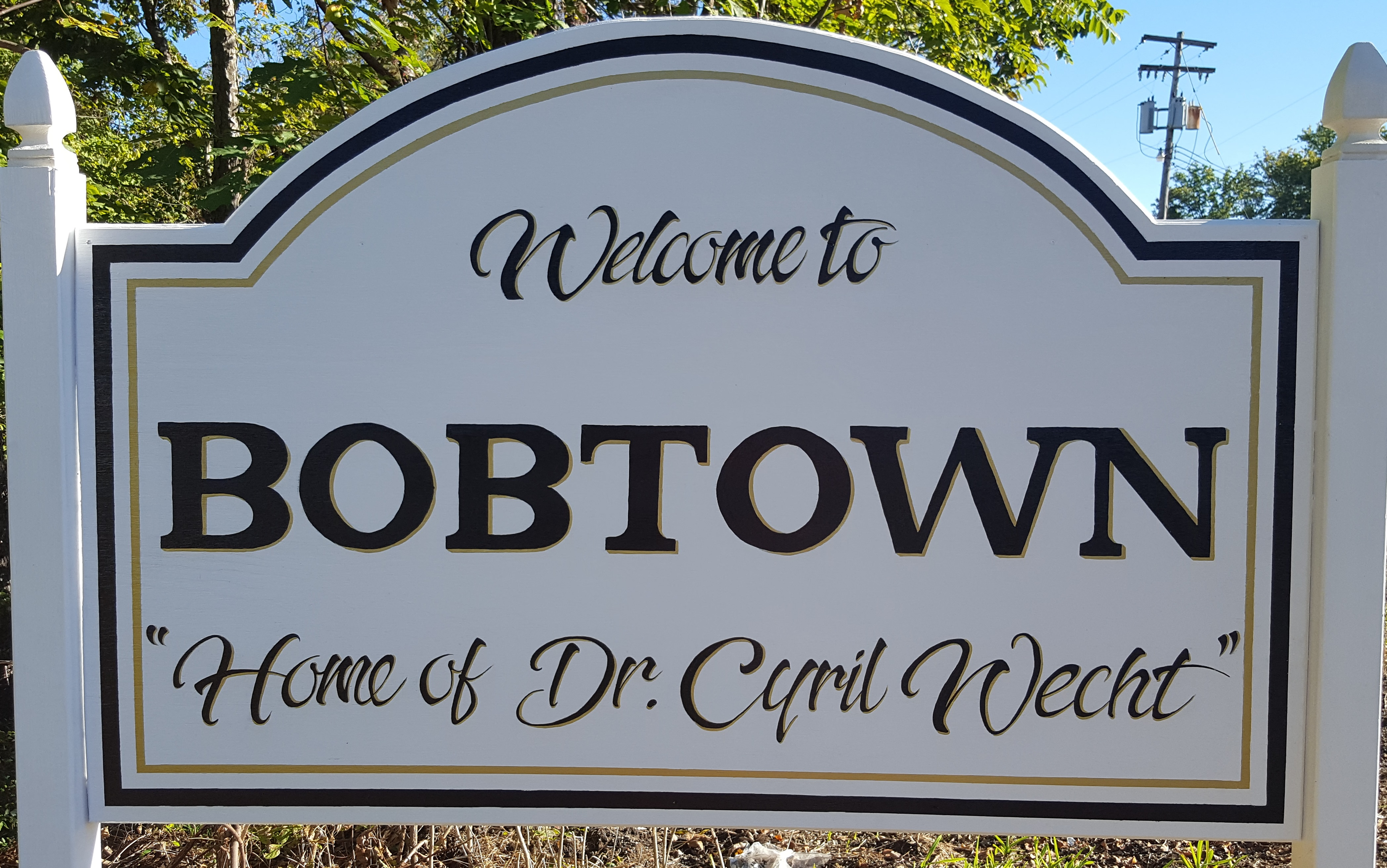
Bobtown Sign

Bobtown was founded by the Shannopin Coal Co in the 1920s to provide housing for miners who worked in the company's mine which was located nearby. The town is named for Robert "Bob" Mapel, who was also the founder of nearby Mapletown.

== Geography ==
The community is in southeastern Greene County near the center of Dunkard Township, on a plateau 350 feet (110 m) above Dunkard Creek. It is 3.5 miles (5.6 km) west of the mouth of Dunkard Creek at the Monongahela River and 19 miles (31 km) southeast of Waynesburg, the Greene County seat. According to the United States Census Bureau, the CDP has a total area of 0.63 square miles (1.64 km^{2}), all land.

== Demographics ==
Historical population
Census	Pop.	Note	%±
2000	742		—
2010	757		2.0%
2020	701		−7.4%
U.S. Decennial Census

As of the census of 2000, there were 742 people, 340 households, and 207 families residing in the town.

The racial makeup of the township was 95.5% White, 1.4% Hispanic, 0.4% Black, 0.3% Native American, and 2.1% from two or more races.

There were 322 households, out of which 23.3% had children under the age of 18 living with them, 50.3% were married couples living together, 10.6% had a female householder with no husband present, and 33.5% were non-families. 28.9% of all households were made up of individuals, and 28.9% had someone living alone who was 65 years of age or older. The average household size was 2.41 and the average family size was 2.95.

The town population was spread out, with 20.1% under the age of 18, 9.4% from 18 to 24, 24.6% from 25 to 44, 21.5% from 45 to 64, and 24.4% who were 65 years of age or older. The median age was 41.7 years.

The median income for a household in the town was $40,038, and the average income for a household was $54,545.

== Climate ==
Climate data for Bobtown, Pennsylvania
Month	Jan	Feb	Mar	Apr	May	Jun	Jul	Aug	Sep	Oct	Nov	Dec	Year
Mean daily maximum °F (°C)	39 (4)	43 (6)	52 (11)	64 (18)	72 (22)	80 (27)	83 (28)	82 (28)	76 (24)	65 (18)	54 (12)	42 (6)	63 (17)
Mean daily minimum °F (°C)	24 (−4)	26 (−3)	32 (0)	42 (6)	50 (10)	59 (15)	63 (17)	62 (17)	55 (13)	44 (7)	36 (2)	27 (−3)	43 (6)
Average precipitation inches (mm)	2.8 (71)	2.7 (69)	3.6 (91)	3.5 (89)	4.6 (120)	4.1 (100)	4.6 (120)	3.5 (89)	3.2 (81)	2.8 (71)	3.5 (89)	2.9 (74)	41.8 (1,064)
Source: weather.com

== Chevron gas well explosion ==
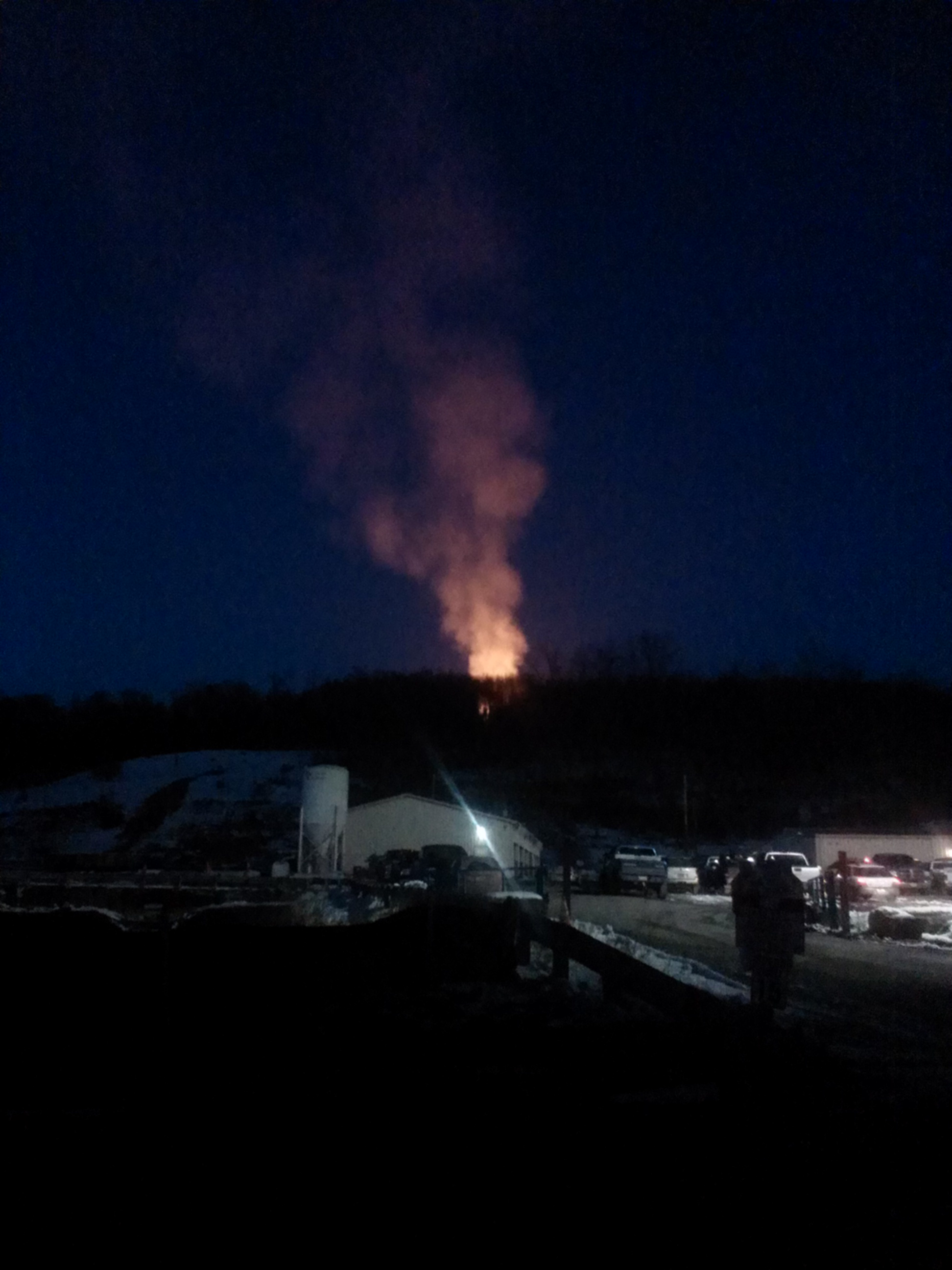
February 11, 2014

On February 11, 2014, Chevron's Lanco 7H well caught fire and burned for several days. The well is located about one mile west of Bobtown on Bald Hill Church Road. The explosion killed contractor Ian McKee, a field service technician for Cameron International, and slightly injured another worker. Chevron representatives distributed pizza coupons to residents as compensation for traffic caused by emergency responders and press. The pizza issue gained national attention from various media outlets, including Comedy Central's The Daily Show which interviewed the owners of Bobtown Pizza.

== Education ==
Bobtown is served by Southeastern Greene School District and is the location of Bobtown Elementary School.

== Media ==
=== Television ===
Call sign	Channel	Description
KDKA-TV	2	CBS owned-and-operated station, Pittsburgh, Pennsylvania
WTAE-TV	4	ABC affiliate, Pittsburgh, Pennsylvania
WPXI	11	NBC affiliate, Pittsburgh, Pennsylvania
WQED	13	PBS station, Pittsburgh, Pennsylvania
WPKD-TV	19	CW Television Network affiliate, Pittsburgh, Pennsylvania
WPNT	22	My Network TV affiliate, Pittsburgh, Pennsylvania
WPGH-TV	53	Fox affiliate, Pittsburgh, Pennsylvania

== Infrastructure ==
=== Utilities ===
Electric service is provided by West Penn Power, natural gas services by Dominion Resources, Water by East Dunkard Water Association and sewage by the dunkard-bobtown municipal authority.

Cable television and cable Internet are provided by Atlantic Broadband. Landline telephone, DSL and Optical fiber Internet services are offered by Windstream Communications.

Trash pickup in the Bobtown area is provided by Preferable Sanitation.

== Notable person ==
- Cyril Wecht, American forensic pathologist
