= Roberts Run (Meadow Run tributary) =

Stream in Pennsylvania, USA

Roberts Run Tributary to Meadow Run
- Location of Roberts Run mouth Roberts Run (Meadow Run tributary) (the United States)

Location
- Country: United States
- State: Pennsylvania
- County: Greene County

Physical characteristics
- Source: Whiteley Creek divide
  - location: about 1.5 miles northwest of Willow Tree, Pennsylvania
  - coordinates: 39°47′41″N 080°00′31″W
  - elevation: 1,170 ft (360 m)
- Mouth: Meadow Run
  - location: at Davistown, Pennsylvania
  - coordinates: 39°45′59″N 080°01′14″W
  - elevation: 919 ft (280 m)
- Length: 2.22 mi (3.57 km)
- Basin size: 1.06 square miles (2.7 km^{2})
- Discharge
  - location: Meadow Run
  - average: 1.56 cu ft/s (0.044 m^{3}/s) at mouth with Meadow Run

Basin features
- Progression: generally southwest
- River system: Monongahela River
- Tributaries
  - left: unnamed tributaries
  - right: unnamed tributaries
- Bridges: Roberts Run Road

Roberts Run is a 2.22 mi (3.57 km) long first-order tributary to Meadow Run in Greene County.

== Course ==
Roberts Run rises about 1.5 miles southwest of Willow Tree, Pennsylvania and then flows southwesterly to join Meadow Run at Davistown, Pennsylvania.

== Watershed ==
Roberts Run drains 1.06 square miles (2.7 km^{2}) of area, receives about 43.2 in/year of precipitation, and is about 87.0% forested.

== See also ==
- List of rivers of Pennsylvania
