= Bell Run (Meadow Run tributary) =

Stream in Pennsylvania, USA

Bell Run Tributary to Meadow Run
- Location of Bell Run mouth Bell Run (Meadow Run tributary) (the United States)

Location
- Country: United States
- State: Pennsylvania
- County: Greene County

Physical characteristics
- Source: North Branch divide
  - location: about 2.5 miles northwest of Davistown, Pennsylvania
  - coordinates: 39°46′51″N 080°04′21″W
  - elevation: 1,220 ft (370 m)
- Mouth: Meadow Run
  - location: at Davistown, Pennsylvania
  - coordinates: 39°46′10″N 080°01′37″W
  - elevation: 948 ft (289 m)
- Length: 2.52 mi (4.06 km)
- Basin size: 1.44 square miles (3.7 km^{2})
- Discharge
  - location: Meadow Run
  - average: 2.13 cu ft/s (0.060 m^{3}/s) at mouth with Meadow Run

Basin features
- Progression: generally southeast
- River system: Monongahela River
- Tributaries
  - left: unnamed tributaries
  - right: unnamed tributaries
- Bridges: Bealls Run Road (x2)

Bell Run is a 2.52 mi (4.06 km) long first-order tributary to Meadow Run in Greene County.

== Course ==
Bell Run rises about 2.5 miles northwest of Davistown, Pennsylvania and then flows southeasterly to join Meadow Run at Davistown, Pennsylvania.

== Watershed ==
Bell Run drains 1.44 square miles (3.7 km^{2}) of area, receives about 43.2 in/year of precipitation, and is about 84.4% forested.

== See also ==
- List of rivers of Pennsylvania
