= Shane Watts =

Australian motorcycle racer (born 1972)

Shane Watts (born 7 November 1972), is an Australian former professional motorcycle enduro racer. He won the 1997 125cc World Enduro Championship as well as several Australian and American national off-road championships during his career. Known for his unpredictability and disregard to injury, many call Watts the "Travis Pastrana" of off-road racing. He has been featured in several films, including Common Ground and Moto3. He has made several instructional DVDs and owned and operated the DirtWise Academy of Off-Road Riding.

== Early years and personal life ==
Watts was born in Maffra, Victoria, Australia and began riding motorcycles at the age of five. He spent many years riding through the club/amateur level, progressing quickly and earning many titles along the way. Money was always tight in the early stages of his racing career. To earn money he started a four-year apprenticeship as an instrument technician at an on-shore gas refinery at the age of 18, and later worked on oil rigs for short periods of time.

== International career ==
The majority of Watts' titles were earned in Australia and Europe. He first won the Australian Enduro Championship in 1993, the same year he first received his sponsorship from KTM (a sponsorship that lasted until 2004). He continued to win the overall championship up until 1999 and later won his class championship in 2006. The year Watts turned pro, 1996, he won the Australian 500cc Motocross Championship. He was also named the World Enduro Champion in 1997, and the following year (1998), was the International Six Days Enduro Overall Champion. Watts accomplished this feat on a 125cc motorcycle, which was previously unheard of. With such an accomplished career in Europe, Watts headed to the United States.

== U.S. career ==
Watts first came to the United States in 1999 with the help of KTM to compete in the Grand National Cross Country series. He soon began winning races, but incurred a knee injury that prevented him from competing for the 1999 title. He returned the following year as the first non-American to claim the title. He was the only one to win GNCC races on multiple engine capacities, riding and winning on six different sizes of KTM motorcycles. At the time the series was still growing, and Watts continued to help draw a crowd. He was described as "brash" and "outspoken". He would show up to a wide array of events and consistently gained the attention of race fans. He would sleep under his van in a sleeping bag the night before a race, do burnouts at the starting gate of a race, and many other things to gain the attention of race fans. He acquired a large amount of injuries that prevented him from continuing to compete at the highest level.

== Instructional DVDs ==
Watts has released multiple instructional DVDs simplifying some of the techniques that allowed him to win numerous championships. The first of these DVDs to be released was DirtWise with Shane Watts. A four volume series titled DirtWise with Shane Watts Advanced is also well into production. Volume 1, featuring mud, sand, and rough ground, and Volume 2, featuring braking and cornering, have already been released. The other two volumes are planned to feature hills, gullies and off cambers (Volume 3) and logs, rocks and wheelies (Volume 4).

== Riding schools ==
Watts' riding schools known as DirtWise Academy. He traveled across the United States hosting many of these schools each year. The school received reviews from many magazines including Dirt Rider. In the Dirt Rider article Watts says that the focus of the academy is "...making everyone a safer, more confident and more comfortable rider through a higher skill level." Other magazines that have reviewed the school include Australian Dirt Bike, Motorcycle USA, and RidersWest Magazine.

== Injuries ==
Watts has gathered a long list of injuries over his racing career. He incurred multiple broken collar bones starting at the age of 17 when he began racing at higher levels. The injury that has affected his career the most is his repeatedly blown ACL. He first blew his ACL in 1996 at an International Six Days Enduro event in Europe, which he did not have treated until four weeks later. He blew the same ACL shortly after surgery, waiting only four weeks to ride when his doctors said he should have waited two and a half months. The third time he blew his ACL he followed all of the doctor's instructions and waited the appropriate amount of time. He blew the same ACL a fourth and final time wheeling for a fan and stepping off of the bike. Watts' most recent injury was acquired setting up for a riding school in 2009. He broke his back in a "simple, slow-speed fall" fracturing five vertebrae, which required six of them to be fused together. It was stated that the doctors' first assessment was that he would be unable to ride again. Less than half a year later Watts returned on his bike to place 11th at the Moose Run AMA National Hare & Hound in Red Mountain, California.
