= Wadestown Covered Bridge =

Bridge in West Virginia, United States

Coordinates: 39.67544°N 80.33943°W

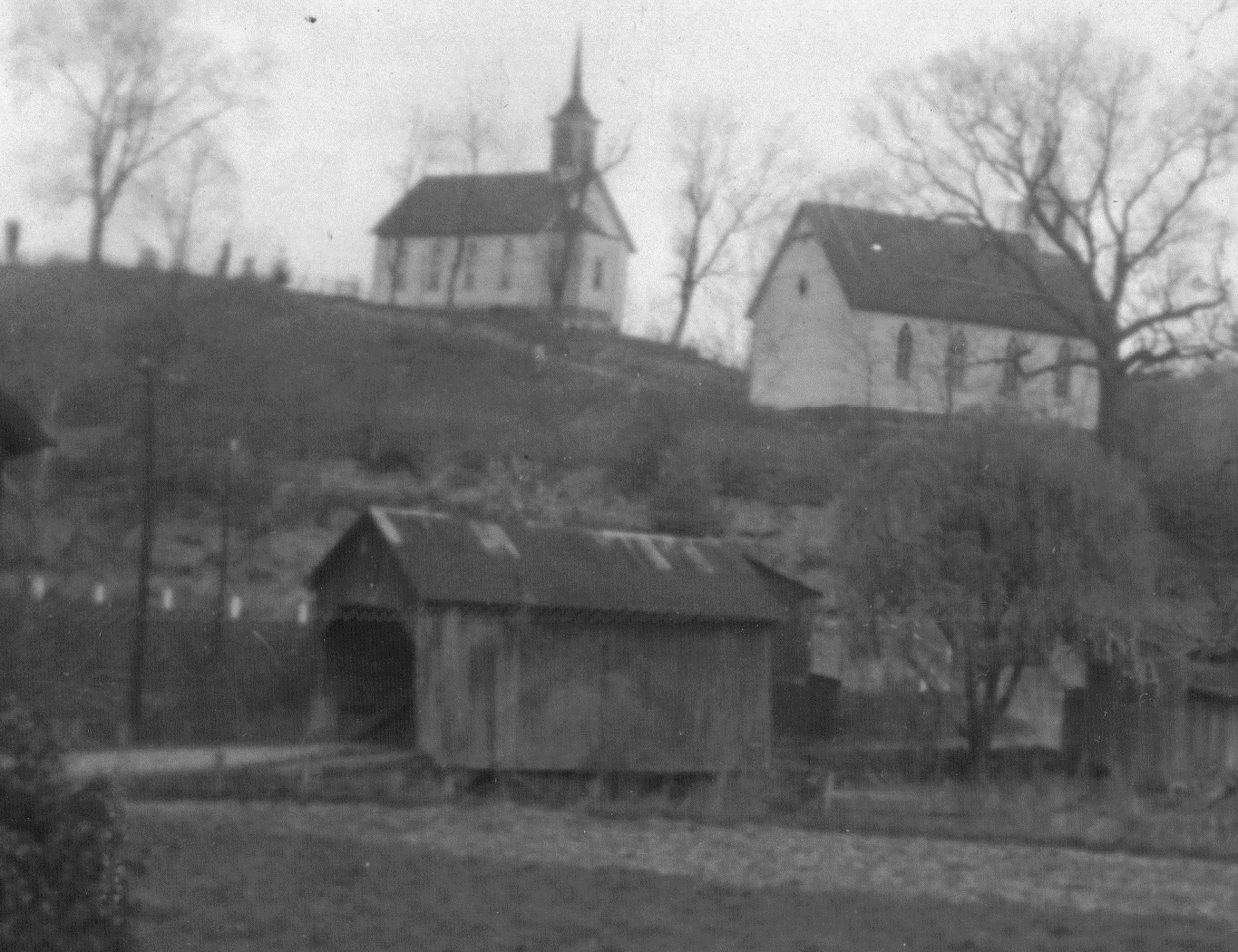
The Wadestown Covered Bridge.

The Wadestown Covered Bridge was a single-lane wooden covered bridge in Wadestown, Monongalia County, West Virginia, United States. It spanned the Virginia (later West Virginia) branch of Dunkard Creek. It was still standing in 1941 when the Work Projects Administration surveyed the state. It was in use into the 1950s.

== See also ==
- List of West Virginia covered bridges
