= Hare scramble =

Form of off-road motorcycle racing

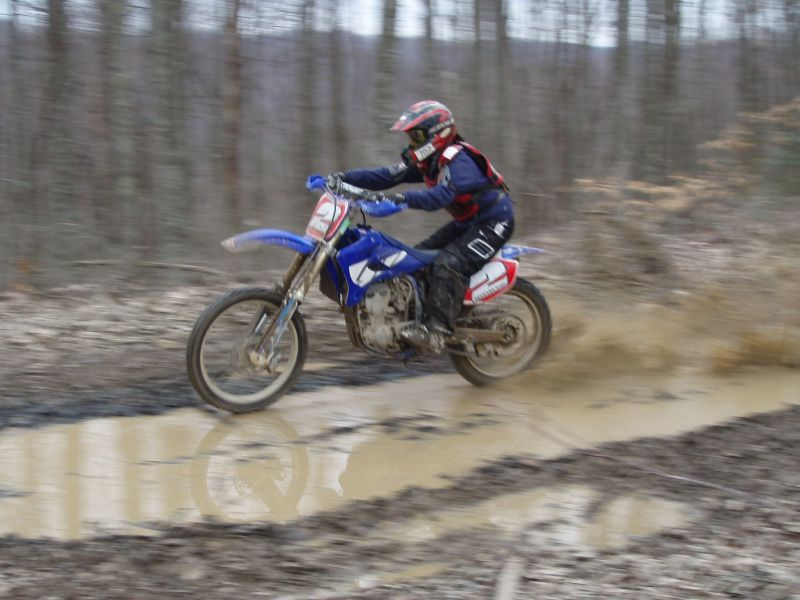
Racer at a hare scramble event near Hyden, Kentucky

Hare scramble is a form of off-road motorcycle racing that varies in distance and time, with the riders completing multiple laps around a marked course through wooded or other rugged natural terrain.

== Course ==
Hare scrambles are conducted on closed course tracks which can vary from 2.5 to 40 mi (4.0 to 64.4 km) or more. The terrain is wooded and fairly rugged in order to test the riders' skills and endurance. The majority of the course consists of a wooded, single and double width trail, with occasional pasture and sand crossings. An event may incorporate a short portion of a pre-existing motocross track. The natural terrain tests the riders' abilities to navigate through obstacles such as creek beds, logs, hills, mud, rocks and ruts. Some trails are cut to 30 in (760 mm) or less so motorcycle handlebars will not fit between trees, requiring special skills to navigate. The winner of each class is typically determined by who completes the most laps within a predetermined period of time. The most common time period for a hare scramble competition is 1, 2 or 3 hours.

A Grand National Cross Country (GNCC) is not a hare scramble; rather GNCC is wide open courses that are laid out to allow ATVs to run the same course as motorbikes. Conversely, hare scramble runs at a slower rate and is much tighter, requiring a different set of skills than GNCC.

== Categorization ==
=== By riders' skills ===
The competitors are typically categorized by their relative skill levels and the displacement of their motorcycle's engine. For example, many hare scrambles categorize rider ability in three categories, A, B, and C; A being the highest skill level. The C class is usually riders who are in their first couple of years of competition or who compete infrequently. There is usually a point system that regulates a rider's progress from the entry level class on up to the top class. A very high level of skill is needed to progress through the various skill categories. Many riders never progress out of the C category of competition, and very few riders have the skill and determination to progress to the A category. There is a meta category AA (double A) that denotes an A rider that competes in Professional events.

=== By engine size ===
The categories based on engine size frequently use the following thresholds of engine capacity: 0–50cc, 66–85cc, 85–100cc, 124cc–200cc, 201–250cc, and larger than 250cc. Accordingly, a beginning rider on a 200cc motorcycle would likely compete in the 200C class, which denotes both the capacity of his or her motorcycle and the relative skill level of the competitor.

=== By rider’s age ===
Once riders reach a certain age they are eligible to enter the “age classes” although they are not forced to: 30+ (30+), 35+ (Veteran), 40+ (Senior), 45+ (Super Senior), 50+ (Master), 55+ (Silver Master), 60+ (Golden Master). The age classes are then categorized by the skill categories as well, for example Vet B.
