= Miracle Run (West Virginia) =

Stream in West Virginia, U.S.

Coordinates: 39°43′12″N 80°14′29″W

Miracle Run is a stream in the U.S. state of West Virginia. It is in Battelle District of Monongalia County.

Miracle Run was not named for wondrous phenomena, but rather for the pioneering Mirale (or Merrical) family which first settled in the area in 1773.

== See also ==
- List of rivers of West Virginia
