= Dolls Run =

Stream in West Virginia, U.S.

Coordinates: 39°42′29″N 80°06′53″W

Dolls Run is a stream in the U.S. state of West Virginia.

Dolls Run was named after Rudolph "Doll" Snider, a pioneer settler.

== See also ==
- List of rivers of West Virginia
