= Dunkard Township, Greene County, Pennsylvania =

Township in Pennsylvania, US

Coordinates: 39°46′00″N 79°59′58″W

- Township
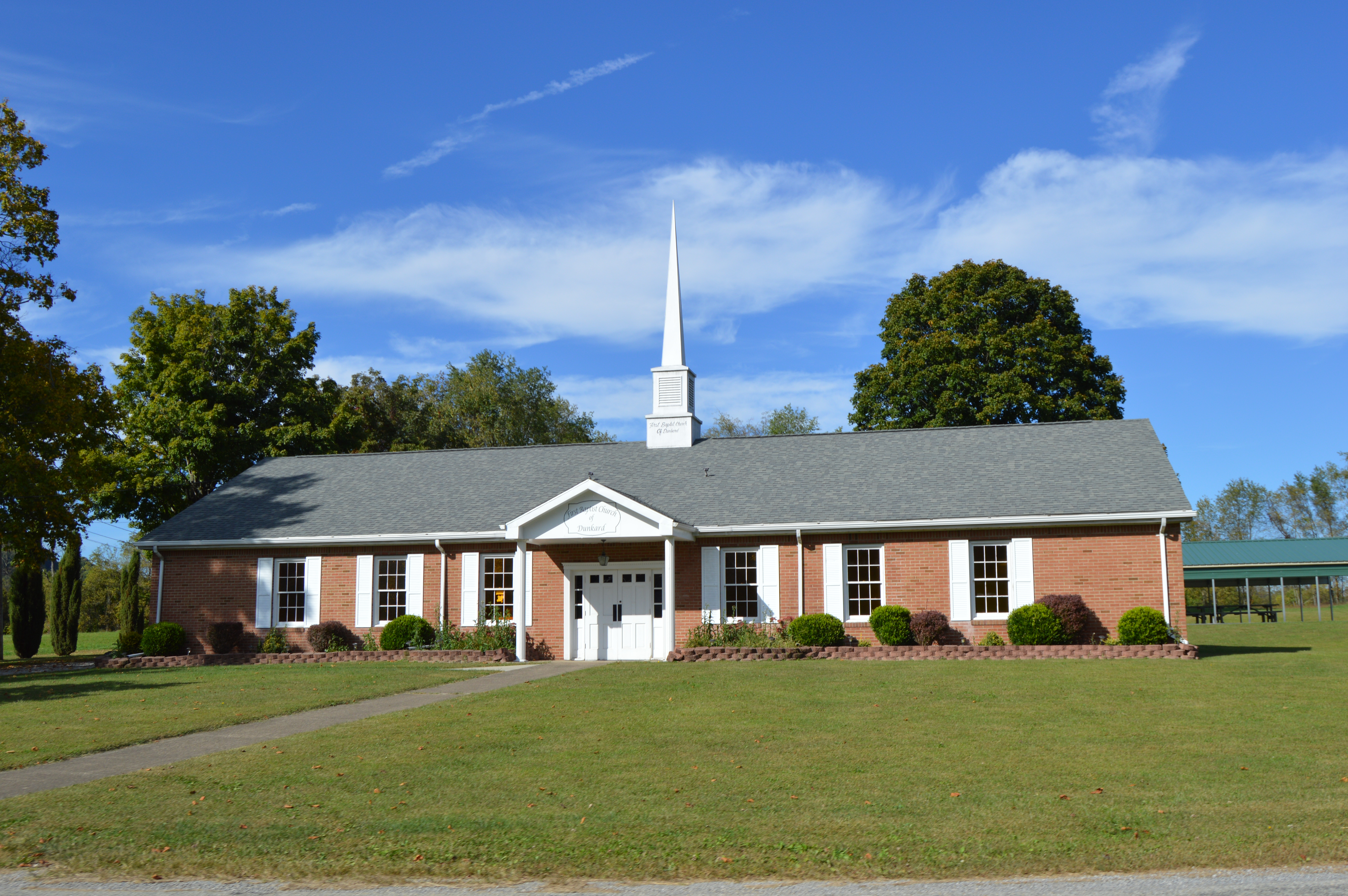
- Baptist church in the community of Dunkard

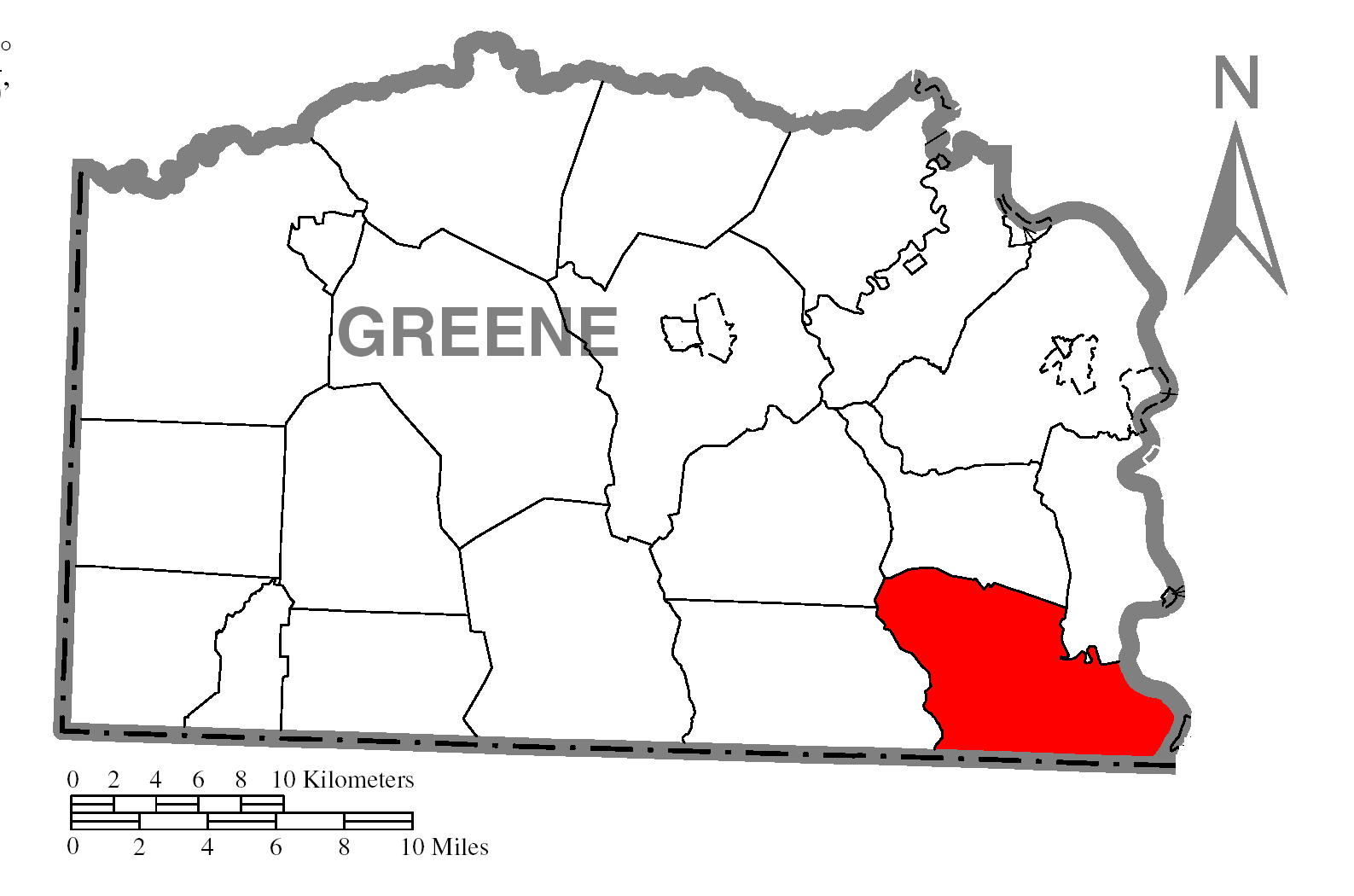
- Location of Dunkard Township in Greene County

- Location of Greene County in Pennsylvania
- Country: United States
- State: Pennsylvania
- County: Greene

Area
  - Total: 31.87 sq mi (82.53 km^{2})
  - Land: 31.57 sq mi (81.76 km^{2})
  - Water: 0.30 sq mi (0.77 km^{2})

Population (2020)
  - Total: 2,173 ▼
  - Estimate (2023): 2,077
  - Density: 73.7/sq mi (28.46/km^{2})
- Time zone: UTC-4 (EST)
  - Summer (DST): UTC-5 (EDT)
- Area code: 724
- FIPS code: 42-059-20296

Dunkard Township is a township in Greene County, Pennsylvania, United States. The population was 2,173 at the 2020 census.

Dunkard Township takes its name from Dunkard Creek, which runs through it.

== Geography ==
Dunkard Township occupies the southeastern corner of Greene County, bordered to the east by the Monongahela River, which forms the Fayette County line. The southern border of the township follows the Pennsylvania–West Virginia state line. Most of the township is drained by Dunkard Creek, an eastward-flowing tributary of the Monongahela. The southernmost part of the township is drained by smaller tributaries of the Monongahela, including Crooked Run. According to the United States Census Bureau, the township has a total area of 31.9 square miles (82.5 km^{2}), of which 31.6 square miles (81.8 km^{2}) are land and 0.3 square miles (0.8 km^{2}), or 0.93%, are water.

Bobtown is a census-designated place in Dunkard Township. Unincorporated communities in the township include Davistown, Bald Hill, Taylortown, Walnut Hill, West Point Marion, Dilliner, Moffitt Sterling, and Newtown.

== Demographics ==
Historical population
| Census | Pop. | Note | %± |
|---|---|---|---|
| 2000 | 2,358 | | — |
| 2010 | 2,372 | | 0.6% |
| 2020 | 2,173 | | −8.4% |
| 2025 (est.) | 2,047 | | −5.8% |
U.S. Decennial Census

As of the census of 2000, there were 2,358 people, 967 households, and 672 families residing in the township. The population density was 74.5 inhabitants per square mile (28.8/km^{2}). There were 1,073 housing units at an average density of 33.9 per square mile (13.1/km^{2}). The racial makeup of the township was 98.85% White, 0.30% African American, 0.04% Native American, 0.21% Asian, and 0.59% from two or more races. Hispanic or Latino of any race were 0.64% of the population.

There were 967 households, out of which 30.1% had children under the age of 18 living with them, 54.2% were married couples living together, 11.2% had a female householder with no husband present, and 30.5% were non-families. 26.9% of all households were made up of individuals, and 13.5% had someone living alone who was 65 years of age or older. The average household size was 2.44 and the average family size was 2.92.

In the township the population was spread out, with 23.4% under the age of 18, 7.2% from 18 to 24, 29.1% from 25 to 44, 24.0% from 45 to 64, and 16.4% who were 65 years of age or older. The median age was 39 years. For every 100 females there were 99.3 males. For every 100 females age 18 and over, there were 94.8 males.

The median income for a household in the township was $25,995, and the median income for a family was $30,357. Males had a median income of $29,625 versus $18,060 for females. The per capita income for the township was $14,537. About 14.7% of families and 19.1% of the population were below the poverty line, including 28.7% of those under age 18 and 11.6% of those age 65 or over.

== Methane gas wells ==
In February 2014, a methane gas well owned by Chevron in Dunkard Township caught fire and burned for four days.
