= Oakland, Kentucky =

- City
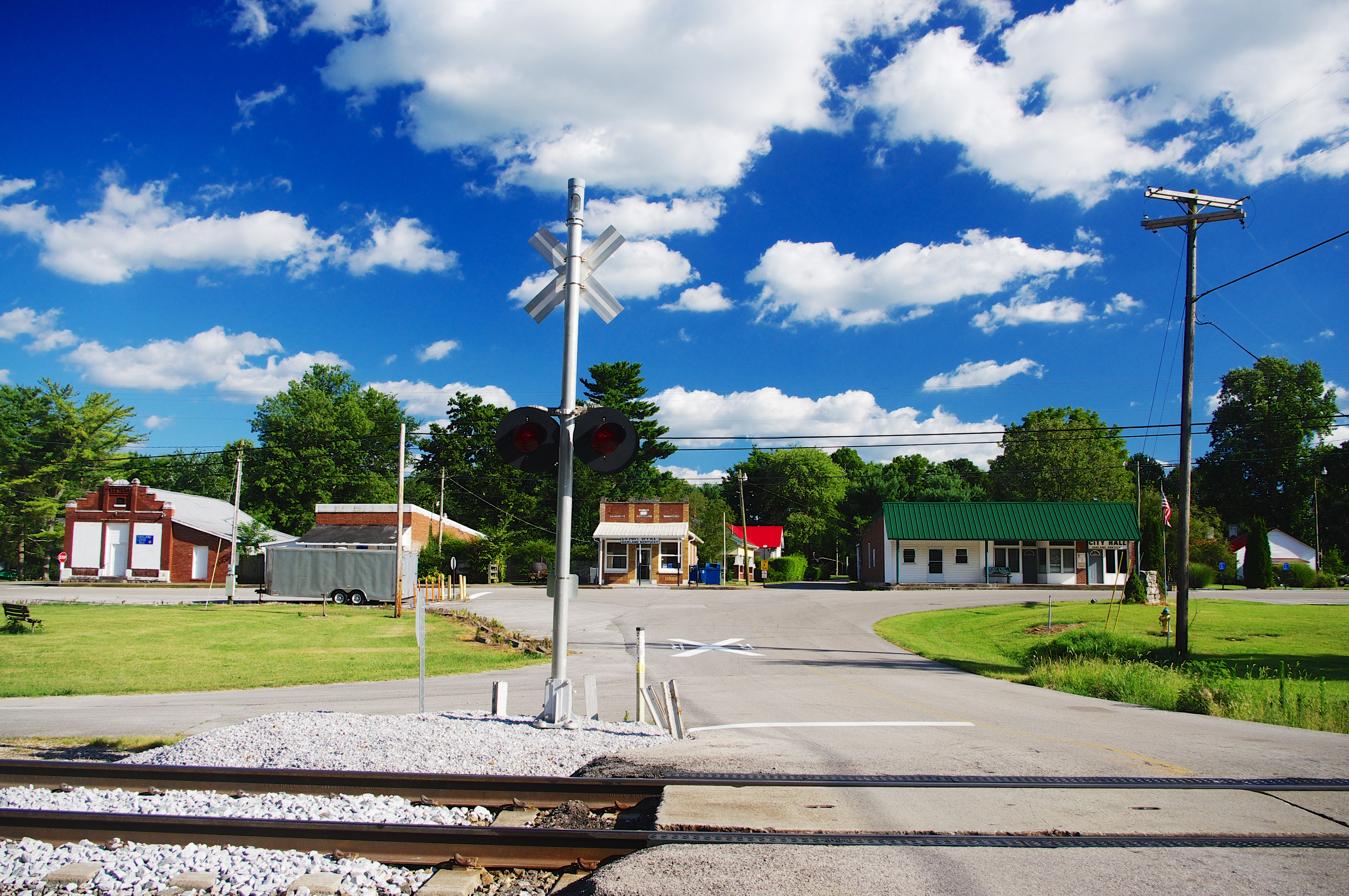
- Buildings along Main Street

- Location of Oakland in Warren County, Kentucky.
- Coordinates: 37°2′30″N 86°14′58″W
- Country: United States
- State: Kentucky
- County: Warren
- Incorporated: 1977
- Named for: its former oak trees

Area
  - Total: 1.41 sq mi (3.64 km^{2})
  - Land: 1.40 sq mi (3.62 km^{2})
  - Water: 0.012 sq mi (0.03 km^{2})
- Elevation: 584 ft (178 m)

Population (2020)
  - Total: 198
  - Density: 141.7/sq mi (54.72/km^{2})
- Time zone: UTC-6 (Central (CST))
  - Summer (DST): UTC-5 (CDT)
- ZIP code: 42159
- Area code: 270
- FIPS code: 21-57144
- GNIS feature ID: 0499732
- Website: oakland.ky.gov

Oakland is a home rule-class city in Warren County, Kentucky, in the United States. The population was 198 during the 2020 Census. It is included in the Bowling Green metropolitan area.

== History ==
In 1859, the city was named for its many oak trees by pioneer William Radford.

== Geography ==
Oakland is located at 37°2′30″N 86°14′58″W (37.041675, -86.249344). According to the United States Census Bureau, the city has a total area of 1.4 square miles (3.6 km^{2}), all land. The city is situated northeast of Bowling Green in an area bordered by U.S. Route 68 on the south, and extending northward in the direction of U.S. Route 31W. Interstate 65 passes south of Oakland. The city of Smiths Grove lies just to the east.

== Demographics ==
Historical population
Census	Pop.	Note	%±
1880	130		—
1910	257		—
1920	252		−1.9%
1930	217		−13.9%
1940	221		1.8%
1950	195		−11.8%
1960	148		−24.1%
1970	144		−2.7%
1980	264		83.3%
1990	202		−23.5%
2000	260		28.7%
2010	225		−13.5%
2020	198		−12.0%
U.S. Decennial Census

As of the census of 2000, there were 260 people, 102 households, and 79 families residing in the city. The population density was 188.1 inhabitants per square mile (72.6/km^{2}). There were 107 housing units at an average density of 77.4 per square mile (29.9/km^{2}). The racial makeup of the city was 88.08% White, 11.54% African American, and 0.38% from two or more races.

There were 102 households, out of which 39.2% had children under the age of 18 living with them, 60.8% were married couples living together, 14.7% had a female householder with no husband present, and 21.6% were non-families. 18.6% of all households were made up of individuals, and 6.9% had someone living alone who was 65 years of age or older. The average household size was 2.55 and the average family size was 2.88.

In the city, the population was spread out, with 25.8% under the age of 18, 6.5% from 18 to 24, 31.2% from 25 to 44, 26.5% from 45 to 64, and 10.0% who were 65 years of age or older. The median age was 37 years. For every 100 females, there were 94.0 males. For every 100 females age 18 and over, there were 85.6 males.

The median income for a household in the city was $38,333, and the median income for a family was $45,938. Males had a median income of $28,750 versus $24,750 for females. The per capita income for the city was $14,762. About 3.7% of families and 7.9% of the population were below the poverty line, including 9.1% of those under the age of eighteen and 10.7% of those 65 or over.

== See also ==
- Other places named Oakland
