= Mount Morris, Pennsylvania =

Unincorporated community in Pennsylvania, US

- Census-designated place
- Location within Pennsylvania Location within the United States
- Coordinates: 39°43′59″N 80°04′04″W
- Country: United States
- State: Pennsylvania
- County: Greene
- Township: Perry

Area
  - Total: 2.67 sq mi (6.91 km^{2})
  - Land: 2.66 sq mi (6.89 km^{2})
  - Water: 0.0077 sq mi (0.02 km^{2})
- Elevation: 938 ft (286 m)

Population (2020)
  - Total: 645
  - Density: 242.5/sq mi (93.62/km^{2})
- Time zone: UTC-5 (Eastern (EST))
  - Summer (DST): UTC-4 (EDT)
- ZIP code: 15349
- Area code: 724
- FIPS code: 42-42059
- GNIS feature ID: 1181752

Mount Morris is an unincorporated community and census-designated place (CDP) in Greene County, Pennsylvania, United States. It is located in Perry Township, near I-79. As of the 2010 census, the population was 737.

== Geography ==
Mount Morris is located at 39°43′59″N 80°04′04″W (39.733135, -80.067842), on Interstate 79 near the West Virginia state line. Its elevation is 938 feet (286 m) above sea level. According to the U.S. Census Bureau, the CDP has a total area of 2.68 square miles (6.95 km^{2}), of which 0.01 square miles (0.02 km^{2}), or 0.27%, are water.

== Demographics ==
Historical population
Census	Pop.	Note	%±
2010	737		—
2020	645		−12.5%
U.S. Decennial Census

== Places of interest ==
High Point Raceway, a motocross track, is located 4 miles (6 km) east of Mount Morris. The track hosts races in the AMA Motocross Championships series, including the High Point Nationals held each Father's Day weekend. Also known for having authentic Native American trails. You can also attend church at Gospel Tabernacle.

== Notable People ==
- Joseph Benton Donley (1838–1917), U.S. congressman
- Levi Morris (1783-1842), Namesake of Town
