= Jackson Township =

Jackson Township may refer to the following places:

== Arkansas ==
- Jackson Township, Boone County, Arkansas
- Jackson Township, Calhoun County, Arkansas, in Calhoun County, Arkansas, defunct
- Jackson Township, Cleveland County, Arkansas, in Cleveland County, Arkansas, defunct
- Jackson Township, Crittenden County, Arkansas
- Jackson Township, Dallas County, Arkansas
- Jackson Township, Little River County, Arkansas
- Jackson Township, Monroe County, Arkansas
- Jackson Township, Nevada County, Arkansas
- Jackson Township, Newton County, Arkansas
- Jackson Township, Pope County, Arkansas
- Jackson Township, Randolph County, Arkansas
- Jackson Township, Sharp County, Arkansas
- Jackson Township, Union County, Arkansas
- Jackson Township, White County, Arkansas

== Illinois ==
- Jackson Township, Effingham County, Illinois
- Jackson Township, Will County, Illinois

== Indiana ==
- Jackson Township, Allen County, Indiana
- Jackson Township, Bartholomew County, Indiana
- Jackson Township, Blackford County, Indiana
- Jackson Township, Boone County, Indiana
- Jackson Township, Brown County, Indiana
- Jackson Township, Carroll County, Indiana
- Jackson Township, Cass County, Indiana
- Jackson Township, Clay County, Indiana
- Jackson Township, Clinton County, Indiana
- Jackson Township, Dearborn County, Indiana
- Jackson Township, Decatur County, Indiana
- Jackson Township, DeKalb County, Indiana
- Jackson Township, Dubois County, Indiana
- Jackson Township, Elkhart County, Indiana
- Jackson Township, Fayette County, Indiana
- Jackson Township, Fountain County, Indiana
- Jackson Township, Greene County, Indiana
- Jackson Township, Hamilton County, Indiana
- Jackson Township, Hancock County, Indiana
- Jackson Township, Harrison County, Indiana
- Jackson Township, Howard County, Indiana
- Jackson Township, Huntington County, Indiana
- Jackson Township, Jackson County, Indiana
- Jackson Township, Jay County, Indiana
- Jackson Township, Kosciusko County, Indiana
- Jackson Township, Madison County, Indiana
- Jackson Township, Miami County, Indiana
- Jackson Township, Morgan County, Indiana
- Jackson Township, Newton County, Indiana
- Jackson Township, Orange County, Indiana
- Jackson Township, Owen County, Indiana
- Jackson Township, Parke County, Indiana
- Jackson Township, Porter County, Indiana
- Jackson Township, Putnam County, Indiana
- Jackson Township, Randolph County, Indiana
- Jackson Township, Ripley County, Indiana
- Jackson Township, Rush County, Indiana
- Jackson Township, Shelby County, Indiana
- Jackson Township, Spencer County, Indiana
- Jackson Township, Starke County, Indiana
- Jackson Township, Steuben County, Indiana
- Jackson Township, Sullivan County, Indiana
- Jackson Township, Tippecanoe County, Indiana
- Jackson Township, Washington County, Indiana
- Jackson Township, Wayne County, Indiana
- Jackson Township, Wells County, Indiana
- Jackson Township, White County, Indiana

== Iowa ==
- Jackson Township, Adair County, Iowa
- Jackson Township, Benton County, Iowa
- Jackson Township, Boone County, Iowa
- Jackson Township, Bremer County, Iowa
- Jackson Township, Butler County, Iowa
- Jackson Township, Calhoun County, Iowa
- Jackson Township, Clarke County, Iowa
- Jackson Township, Crawford County, Iowa
- Jackson Township, Des Moines County, Iowa, in Des Moines County
- Jackson Township, Greene County, Iowa
- Jackson Township, Guthrie County, Iowa
- Jackson Township, Hardin County, Iowa
- Jackson Township, Harrison County, Iowa
- Jackson Township, Henry County, Iowa
- Jackson Township, Jackson County, Iowa
- Jackson Township, Jones County, Iowa
- Jackson Township, Keokuk County, Iowa
- Jackson Township, Lee County, Iowa
- Jackson Township, Linn County, Iowa
- Jackson Township, Lucas County, Iowa
- Jackson Township, Madison County, Iowa
- Jackson Township, Monroe County, Iowa
- Jackson Township, Poweshiek County, Iowa
- Jackson Township, Sac County, Iowa
- Jackson Township, Shelby County, Iowa, in Shelby County
- Jackson Township, Taylor County, Iowa
- Jackson Township, Van Buren County, Iowa
- Jackson Township, Warren County, Iowa, in Warren County
- Jackson Township, Washington County, Iowa, in Washington County
- Jackson Township, Wayne County, Iowa
- Jackson Township, Webster County, Iowa
- Jackson Township, Winneshiek County, Iowa

== Kansas ==
- Jackson Township, Anderson County, Kansas
- Jackson Township, Edwards County, Kansas
- Jackson Township, Geary County, Kansas
- Jackson Township, Jewell County, Kansas
- Jackson Township, Lyon County, Kansas
- Jackson Township, McPherson County, Kansas
- Jackson Township, Osborne County, Kansas, in Osborne County, Kansas
- Jackson Township, Riley County, Kansas, in Riley County, Kansas
- Jackson Township, Sumner County, Kansas, in Sumner County, Kansas

== Minnesota ==
- Jackson Township, Scott County, Minnesota

== Missouri ==
- Jackson Township, Andrew County, Missouri
- Jackson Township, Buchanan County, Missouri
- Jackson Township, Callaway County, Missouri
- Jackson Township, Camden County, Missouri
- Jackson Township, Carter County, Missouri
- Jackson Township, Clark County, Missouri
- Jackson Township, Clinton County, Missouri
- Jackson Township, Dallas County, Missouri
- Jackson Township, Daviess County, Missouri
- Jackson Township, Douglas County, Missouri, in Douglas County, Missouri
- Jackson Township, Gentry County, Missouri
- Jackson Township, Grundy County, Missouri
- Jackson Township, Jasper County, Missouri
- Jackson Township, Johnson County, Missouri
- Jackson Township, Linn County, Missouri
- Jackson Township, Livingston County, Missouri
- Jackson Township, Macon County, Missouri, in Macon County, Missouri
- Jackson Township, Maries County, Missouri
- Jackson Township, Monroe County, Missouri
- Jackson Township, Nodaway County, Missouri
- Jackson Township, Osage County, Missouri
- Jackson Township, Ozark County, Missouri
- Jackson Township, Polk County, Missouri
- Jackson Township, Putnam County, Missouri
- Jackson Township, Randolph County, Missouri
- Jackson Township, Reynolds County, Missouri
- Jackson Township, St. Clair County, Missouri
- Jackson Township, Ste. Genevieve County, Missouri
- Jackson Township, Shannon County, Missouri
- Jackson Township, Shelby County, Missouri
- Jackson Township, Sullivan County, Missouri
- Jackson Township, Texas County, Missouri
- Jackson Township, Webster County, Missouri

== New Jersey ==
- Jackson Township, New Jersey

== North Carolina ==
- Jackson Township, Nash County, North Carolina, in Nash County, North Carolina
- Jackson Township, Northampton County, North Carolina, in Northampton County, North Carolina
- Jackson Township, Union County, North Carolina, in Union County, North Carolina

== North Dakota ==
- Jackson Township, Sargent County, North Dakota, in Sargent County, North Dakota

== Ohio ==
- Jackson Township, Allen County, Ohio
- Jackson Township, Ashland County, Ohio
- Jackson Township, Auglaize County, Ohio
- Jackson Township, Brown County, Ohio
- Jackson Township, Champaign County, Ohio
- Jackson Township, Clermont County, Ohio
- Jackson Township, Coshocton County, Ohio
- Jackson Township, Crawford County, Ohio
- Jackson Township, Darke County, Ohio
- Jackson Township, Franklin County, Ohio
- Jackson Township, Guernsey County, Ohio
- Jackson Township, Hancock County, Ohio
- Jackson Township, Hardin County, Ohio
- Jackson Township, Highland County, Ohio
- Jackson Township, Jackson County, Ohio
- Jackson Township, Knox County, Ohio
- Jackson Township, Mahoning County, Ohio
- Jackson Township, Monroe County, Ohio
- Jackson Township, Montgomery County, Ohio
- Jackson Township, Muskingum County, Ohio
- Jackson Township, Noble County, Ohio
- Jackson Township, Paulding County, Ohio
- Jackson Township, Perry County, Ohio
- Jackson Township, Pickaway County, Ohio
- Jackson Township, Pike County, Ohio
- Jackson Township, Preble County, Ohio
- Jackson Township, Putnam County, Ohio
- Jackson Township, Richland County, Ohio
- Jackson Township, Sandusky County, Ohio
- Jackson Township, Seneca County, Ohio
- Jackson Township, Shelby County, Ohio
- Jackson Township, Stark County, Ohio
- Jackson Township, Union County, Ohio
- Jackson Township, Van Wert County, Ohio
- Jackson Township, Vinton County, Ohio
- Jackson Township, Wood County, Ohio
- Jackson Township, Wyandot County, Ohio

== Pennsylvania ==
- Jackson Township, Butler County, Pennsylvania
- Jackson Township, Cambria County, Pennsylvania
- Jackson Township, Columbia County, Pennsylvania
- Jackson Township, Dauphin County, Pennsylvania
- Jackson Township, Greene County, Pennsylvania
- Jackson Township, Huntingdon County, Pennsylvania
- Jackson Township, Lebanon County, Pennsylvania
- Jackson Township, Luzerne County, Pennsylvania
- Jackson Township, Lycoming County, Pennsylvania
- Jackson Township, Mercer County, Pennsylvania
- Jackson Township, Monroe County, Pennsylvania
- Jackson Township, Northumberland County, Pennsylvania
- Jackson Township, Perry County, Pennsylvania
- Jackson Township, Snyder County, Pennsylvania
- Jackson Township, Susquehanna County, Pennsylvania
- Jackson Township, Tioga County, Pennsylvania
- Jackson Township, Venango County, Pennsylvania
- Jackson Township, York County, Pennsylvania

== South Dakota ==
- Jackson Township, Charles Mix County, South Dakota, in Charles Mix County, South Dakota
- Jackson Township, Sanborn County, South Dakota, in Sanborn County, South Dakota
