= Jackson Township, Missouri =

Jackson Township is the name of thirty-three townships in Missouri:

- Jackson Township, Andrew County, Missouri
- Jackson Township, Buchanan County, Missouri
- Jackson Township, Callaway County, Missouri
- Jackson Township, Camden County, Missouri
- Jackson Township, Carter County, Missouri
- Jackson Township, Clark County, Missouri
- Jackson Township, Clinton County, Missouri
- Jackson Township, Dallas County, Missouri
- Jackson Township, Daviess County, Missouri
- Jackson Township, Douglas County, Missouri
- Jackson Township, Gentry County, Missouri
- Jackson Township, Grundy County, Missouri
- Jackson Township, Jasper County, Missouri
- Jackson Township, Johnson County, Missouri
- Jackson Township, Linn County, Missouri
- Jackson Township, Livingston County, Missouri
- Jackson Township, Macon County, Missouri
- Jackson Township, Maries County, Missouri
- Jackson Township, Monroe County, Missouri
- Jackson Township, Nodaway County, Missouri
- Jackson Township, Osage County, Missouri
- Jackson Township, Ozark County, Missouri
- Jackson Township, Polk County, Missouri
- Jackson Township, Putnam County, Missouri
- Jackson Township, Randolph County, Missouri
- Jackson Township, Reynolds County, Missouri
- Jackson Township, Shannon County, Missouri
- Jackson Township, Shelby County, Missouri
- Jackson Township, St. Clair County, Missouri
- Jackson Township, Ste. Genevieve County, Missouri
- Jackson Township, Sullivan County, Missouri
- Jackson Township, Texas County, Missouri
- Jackson Township, Webster County, Missouri

== See also ==
- Jackson Township (disambiguation)
