= Jackson Township, Arkansas =

Jackson Township, Arkansas may refer to:

- Jackson Township, Boone County, Arkansas
- Jackson Township, Crittenden County, Arkansas
- Jackson Township, Dallas County, Arkansas
- Jackson Township, Little River County, Arkansas
- Jackson Township, Monroe County, Arkansas
- Jackson Township, Nevada County, Arkansas
- Jackson Township, Newton County, Arkansas
- Jackson Township, Pope County, Arkansas
- Jackson Township, Randolph County, Arkansas
- Jackson Township, Sharp County, Arkansas
- Jackson Township, Union County, Arkansas
- Jackson Township, White County, Arkansas

Former townships:

- Jackson Township, Calhoun County, Arkansas
- Jackson Township, Cleveland County, Arkansas

== See also ==
- Jackson Township (disambiguation)
- List of Arkansas townships
