= List of places in Arkansas: J =

Arkansas State Seal

This list of current cities, towns, unincorporated communities, and other recognized places in the U.S. state of Arkansas whose name begins with the letter J. It also includes information on the number and names of counties in which the place lies, and its lower and upper zip code bounds, if applicable.

== Cities and Towns ==
Name of place	Number of counties	Principal county	Lower zip code	Upper zip code
Jacinto	1	Dallas County		
Jackson Ford	1	Cleburne County		
Jackson Heights	1	Pulaski County	72076	
Jacksonport	1	Jackson County	72075	
Jacksonville	1	Pulaski County	72076	
James Mill	1	Crittenden County		
Jamestown	1	Independence County	72501	
Jamestown	1	Johnson County	72830	
Japton	1	Madison County	72740	
Jasmine	1	Prairie County		
Jasper	1	Newton County	72641	
Jeannette	1	Crittenden County	72346	
Jefferson	1	Columbia County		
Jefferson	1	Jefferson County	72079	
Jeffersonville	1	Lee County		
Jeffrey	1	Pulaski County	72118	
Jennette	1	Crittenden County	72346	
Jennie	1	Chicot County	71649	
Jenny Lind	1	Sebastian County	72903	
Jenson	1	Sebastian County	72937	
Jericho	1	Crittenden County	72327	
Jerome	1	Drew County	71650	
Jerrett	1	Randolph County	72444	
Jersey	1	Bradley County	71651	
Jerusalem	1	Conway County	72080	
Jessieville	1	Garland County	71949	
Jesup	1	Lawrence County	72466	
Jethro	1	Franklin County	72949	
Jewell	1	Little River County		
Jimmerson	1	Pulaski County		
J J R Spur	1	Howard County		
Joan	1	Clark County	71923	
Johnson	1	Logan County		
Johnson	1	Washington County	72741	
Johnsons	1	Washington County		
Johnston	1	Columbia County		
Johnstown	1	Jackson County	72112	
Johnstown	1	Jackson County		
Johnsville	1	Bradley County	71647	
Joiner	1	Mississippi County	72350	
Jolliff Store	1	Mississippi County	72438	
Jonesboro	1	Craighead County	72401	
Jones Mill	1	Hot Spring County	72105	
Jones Mills	1	Hot Spring County	72105	
Jonesville	1	Miller County	71837	
Jonquil	1	St. Francis County		
Joplin	1	Montgomery County	71957	
Jordan	1	Baxter County	72519	
Joy	1	White County	72143	
Joyce City	1	Ouachita County	71751	
Joyland	1	Poinsett County	72365	
Joyland Park	1	Logan County	72927	
Judd Hill	1	Poinsett County	72472	
Judsonia	1	White County	72081	
Julius	1	Crittenden County	72327	
Jumbo	1	Izard County	72556	
Junction City	1	Union County	71749	
Jurden	1	St. Francis County	72348	

== Townships ==
Name of place	Number of counties	Principal county	Lower zip code	Upper zip code
Jackson Township	1	Boone County		
Jackson Township	1	Calhoun County		
Jackson Township	1	Cleveland County		
Jackson Township	1	Crittenden County		
Jackson Township	1	Dallas County		
Jackson Township	1	Little River County		
Jackson Township	1	Monroe County		
Jackson Township	1	Nevada County		
Jackson Township	1	Newton County		
Jackson Township	1	Pope County		
Jackson Township	1	Randolph County		
Jackson Township	1	Sharp County		
Jackson Township	1	Union County		
Jackson Township	1	White County		
James Township	1	Scott County		
James Creek Township	1	Marion County		
James R Bush Township	1	Phillips County		
Janes Creek Township	1	Randolph County		
Japton Township	1	Madison County		
Jasper Township	1	Crawford County		
Jasper Township	1	Crittenden County		
Jeff Davis Township	1	Little River County		
Jefferson Township	1	Boone County		
Jefferson Township	1	Calhoun County		
Jefferson Township	1	Desha County		
Jefferson Township	1	Independence County		
Jefferson Township	1	Izard County		
Jefferson Township	1	Jackson County		
Jefferson Township	1	Jefferson County	71602	72132
Jefferson Township	1	Little River County		
Jefferson Township	1	Marion County		
Jefferson Township	1	Newton County		
Jefferson Township	1	Ouachita County		
Jefferson Township	1	Saline County		
Jefferson Township	1	Sevier County		
Jefferson Township	1	White County		
Jessieville Township	1	Garland County		
Jesup Township	1	Lawrence County		
Jewell Township	1	Little River County		
Jim Fork Township	1	Sebastian County		
Joe Burleson Township	1	Marion County		
Johnson Township	1	Clay County		
Johnson Township	1	Little River County		
Johnson Township	1	Logan County		
Johnson Township	1	St. Francis County		
Johnson Township	1	Sharp County		
Johnson Township	1	Union County		
Johnson Township	1	Washington County		
Jones Township	1	Greene County		
Jones Township	1	Newton County		
Jones Township	1	Scott County		
Jones Township	1	Stone County		
Jonesboro Township	1	Craighead County		
Joy Township	1	White County		
