= Jackson Township, Pennsylvania =

Jackson Township is the name of some places in the U.S. state of Pennsylvania:

- Jackson Township, Butler County, Pennsylvania
- Jackson Township, Cambria County, Pennsylvania
- Jackson Township, Columbia County, Pennsylvania
- Jackson Township, Dauphin County, Pennsylvania
- Jackson Township, Greene County, Pennsylvania
- Jackson Township, Huntingdon County, Pennsylvania
- Jackson Township, Lebanon County, Pennsylvania
- Jackson Township, Luzerne County, Pennsylvania
- Jackson Township, Lycoming County, Pennsylvania
- Jackson Township, Mercer County, Pennsylvania
- Jackson Township, Monroe County, Pennsylvania
- Jackson Township, Northumberland County, Pennsylvania
- Jackson Township, Perry County, Pennsylvania
- Jackson Township, Snyder County, Pennsylvania
- Jackson Township, Susquehanna County, Pennsylvania
- Jackson Township, Tioga County, Pennsylvania
- Jackson Township, Venango County, Pennsylvania
- Jackson Township, York County, Pennsylvania
