= Jackson Township, Greene County, Pennsylvania =

Township in Pennsylvania, US

Coordinates: 39°50′00″N 80°21′59″W

- Township
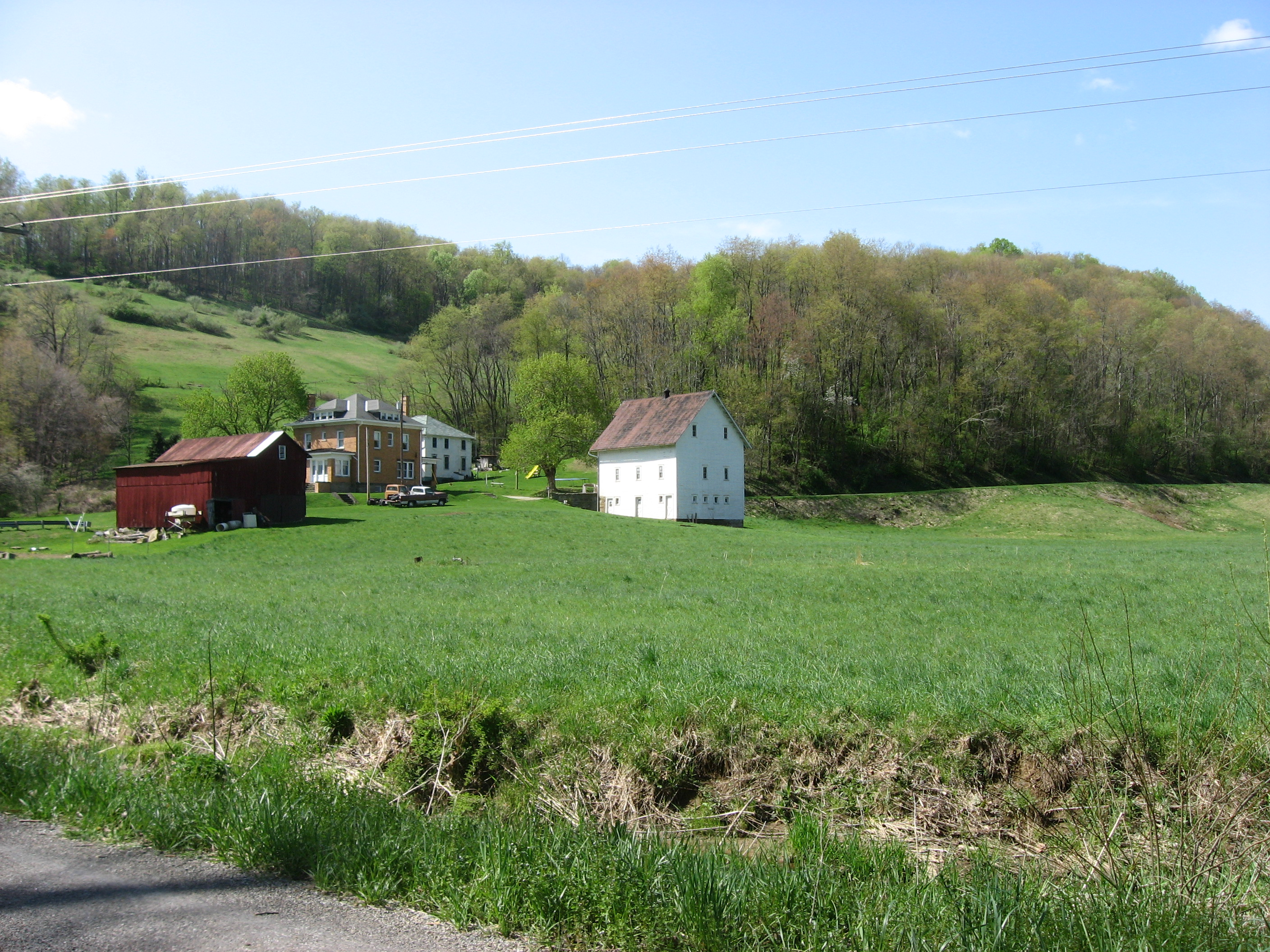
- A farm in Jackson Township

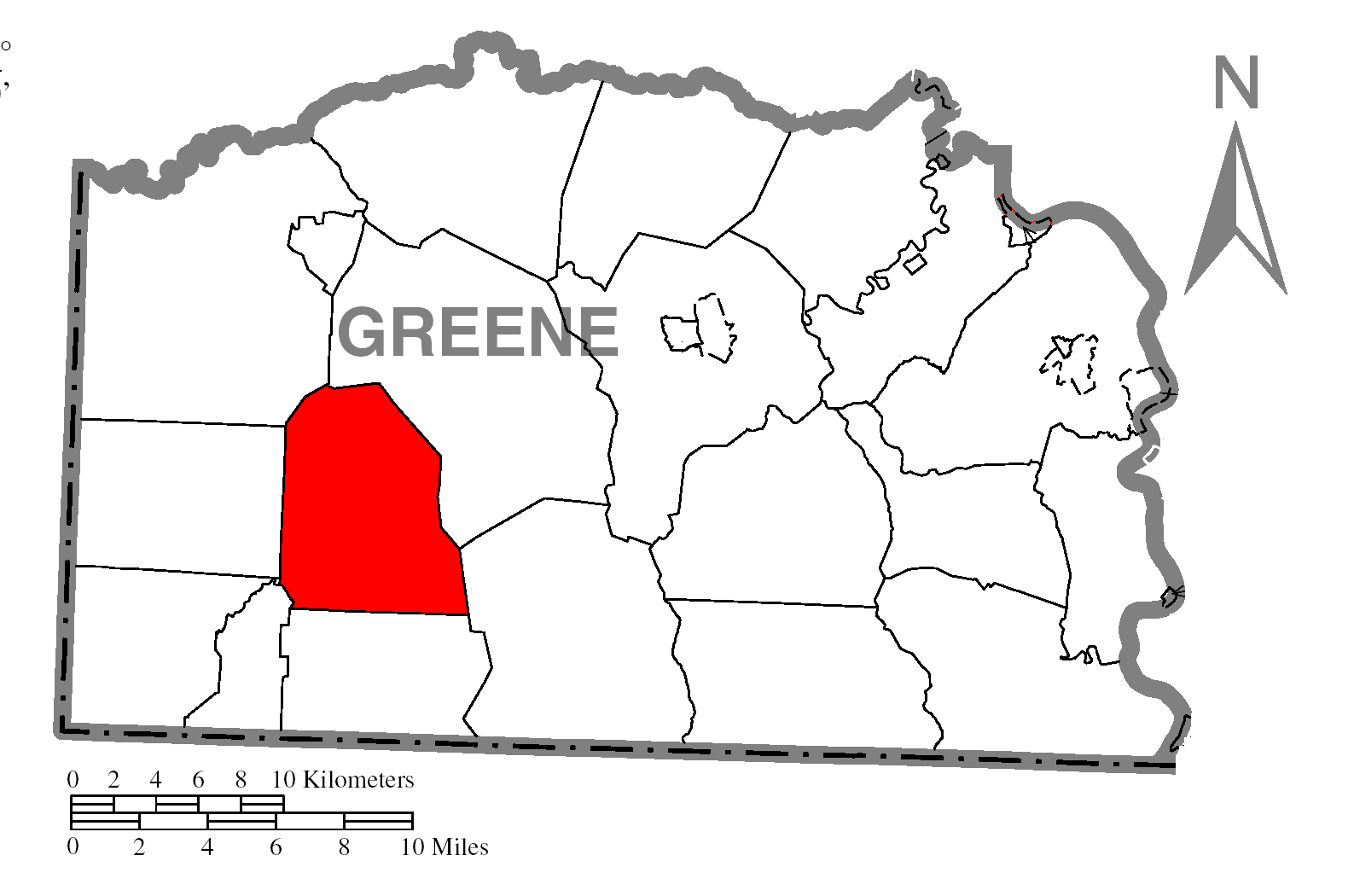
- Location of Jackson Township in Greene County
- Country: United States
- State: Pennsylvania
- County: Greene

Area
  - Total: 28.74 sq mi (74.44 km^{2})
  - Land: 28.73 sq mi (74.40 km^{2})
  - Water: 0.012 sq mi (0.03 km^{2})

Population (2020)
  - Total: 381 ▼
  - Estimate (2023): 373
  - Density: 16.3/sq mi (6.28/km^{2})
- Time zone: UTC-4 (EST)
  - Summer (DST): UTC-5 (EDT)
- Area code: 724
- FIPS code: 42-059-37376

Jackson Township is an American township that is located in Greene County, Pennsylvania. The population was 381 at the time of the 2020 census.

== History ==
The Richard T. Foley Site, William Cree House, Hughes House, and John Rex Farm are listed on the National Register of Historic Places.

== Geography ==
Jackson Township is located in western Greene County. Unincorporated communities in the township include Nettle Hill, Buzz, Bluff, White Cottage, Delphene, and Woodruff. According to the United States Census Bureau, the township has a total area of 28.7 square miles (74.4 km^{2}), of which 0.01 square miles (0.03 km^{2}), or 0.05%, is water.

== Demographics ==
Historical population
Census	Pop.	Note	%±
2000	516		—
2010	487		−5.6%
2020	381		−21.8%
2025 (est.)	367		−3.7%
U.S. Decennial Census

As of the census of 2000, there were 516 people, 192 households, and 145 families residing in the township.

The population density was 17.5 people per square mile (6.8/km^{2}). There were 228 housing units at an average density of 7.7/sq mi (3.0/km^{2}).

The racial makeup of the township was 98.84% White, 0.19% Pacific Islander, and 0.97% from two or more races.

There were 192 households, out of which 34.4% had children under the age of eighteen living with them; 62.0% were married couples living together, 8.3% had a female householder with no husband present, and 24.0% were non-families. 20.3% of all households were made up of individuals, and 8.3% had someone living alone who was sixty-five years of age or older.

The average household size was 2.69 and the average family size was 3.09.

In the township, the population was spread out, with 25.4% under the age of eighteen, 9.5% from eighteen to twenty-four, 23.3% from twenty-five to forty-four, 28.5% from forty-five to sixty-four, and 13.4% who were sixty-five years of age or older. The median age was thirty-nine years.

For every one hundred females, there were 101.6 males. For every one hundred females who were aged eighteen or older, there were 102.6 males.

The median income for a household in the township was $32,188, and the median income for a family was $37,500. Males had a median income of $35,000 compared with that of $20,625 for females.

The per capita income for the township was $12,653.

Roughly 15.1% of families and 22.9% of the population were living below the poverty line, including 32.0% of those who were under the age of eighteen and 23.9% of those who were aged sixty-five or older.
