= Jackson Township, South Dakota =

Jackson Township is the name of 2 townships in the U.S. state of South Dakota:

- Jackson Township, Charles Mix County, South Dakota
- Jackson Township, Sanborn County, South Dakota

== See also ==
- Jackson Township (disambiguation)
