= Jackson Township, Oklahoma =

Jackson Township is the name of 3 townships in the U.S. state of Oklahoma:

- Jackson Township, Coal County, Oklahoma
- Jackson Township, Cotton County, Oklahoma
- Jackson Township, Washington County, Oklahoma

== See also ==
- Jackson Township (disambiguation)
