= Jackson Township, North Carolina =

Jackson Township is the name of 3 townships in the U.S. state of North Carolina:

- Jackson Township, Nash County, North Carolina
- Jackson Township, Northampton County, North Carolina
- Jackson Township, Union County, North Carolina

== See also ==
- Jackson Township (disambiguation)
