= National lidar dataset =

A national lidar dataset is a high-resolution lidar dataset mapping most—and ideally all—of a nation's terrain. Datasets of this type typically meet specified quality standards and are publicly available for free (or at nominal cost) in one or more uniform formats from government or academic sources. National LiDAR datasets are used primarily in topographic mapping, and also for forestry, urban and rural planning, recreational, environmental, engineering, and geological studies and planning, among others.

Countries with national lidar datasets either completed or in progress include:

Country	Dataset Status	Resolution (pts/m^{2})	Source	Additional information
Canada	Montréal completed, 2015	10		
Denmark	Completed, 2008, 2013	4	,	Pointspacing is from 4/m2 to 1.6m
England	In progress	0.5, 1.0, 4.0 and 16.0	,	National LIDAR Dataset - England, carried out by the Environment Agency. 75% coverage of England at 2m resolution or higher. Composite, Tiled (historic) LIDAR and Point Cloud are available as Open Data.
Estonia	Completed	0.15-18		Planning to cover the country after each four years
Finland	Completed	0.5		
France	In progress	10		
Latvia	In progress, 2013-2018	4		
Netherlands	Completed, 2003	1/25 - 1/16 (AHN1), 6 - 10 (AHN2)	,,,,,.	Pointspacing is 4-5 m for AHN-1 and 6-10 points/m^{2} for AHN-2. Data became available 2014. AHN-3 (third scan of the country, to be completed 2019) is partially available since September 2015
New Zealand	In discussion	n/a		Requests for source point cloud data by contacting LINZ directly at imagery@linz.govt.nz
Poland	In progress	from 4 to 12		IT project for protecting the country against extraordinary threats
Portugal	Completed, 2024	0,5m and 2m		Official coverage created by DGT (Direção-Geral do Território).
Slovenia	Completed, 2015	5		Created by the Slovenian Environment Agency as a basis for environmental threat protection models. Some landslide- and flood-prone areas were scanned at 10 pts/m^{2}, some remote areas only at 2 pts/m^{2}. Data is available for free for any purpose (attribution is required).
Spain	Completed, 2015. Second survey in progress	0.5		It is part of National Orthophoto Project
Sweden	In progress	0.5		
Switzerland	Completed, in progress (until 2024)	1, 5 - 15		Open Data access,Sample LIDAR Dataset - Switzerland
USA	In discussion	n/a		National LIDAR Dataset - USA

== See also ==
- Digital elevation model
- National Elevation Dataset
- Remote sensing
- Topography
