= Lake Arrowhead, Missouri =

- Census-designated place
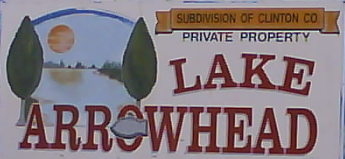
- Entrance sign

- Location within Missouri Location within the United States
- Coordinates: 39°28′59″N 94°19′0″W
- Country: United States
- State: Missouri
- County: Clinton
- Township: Jackson

Area
  - Total: 1.46 sq mi (3.79 km^{2})
  - Land: 1.29 sq mi (3.33 km^{2})
  - Water: 0.18 sq mi (0.46 km^{2})
- Elevation: 1,014 ft (309 m)

Population (2020)
  - Total: 363
  - Density: 282.6/sq mi (109.12/km^{2})
- Time zone: UTC-6 (Central (CST))
  - Summer (DST): UTC-5 (CDT)
- ZIP Code: 64465
- Area code: 816
- FIPS code: 29-39852
- GNIS feature ID: 2806395

Lake Arrowhead is a private community and census-designated place (CDP) in Clinton County, Missouri, United States. It is in the southeastern part of the county, surrounding a lake of the same name. It is 4 miles (6 km) south of Lathrop, 3 miles (5 km) north of Holt, and 33 miles (53 km) northeast of Kansas City. It is served by the Lathrop post office.

Lake Arrowhead was first listed as a CDP prior to the 2020 census.

The subdivision is operated and managed by the Lake Arrowhead Property Owners Association, consisting of all owners in good standing, who elect a volunteer Board of Trustees. There are 2,058 total lots in the subdivision.

== Geography ==
According to the U.S. Census Bureau, the Lake Arrowhead CDP has a total area of 1.46 square miles (3.79 km^{2}), of which 1.29 square miles (3.33 km^{2}) are land and 0.18 square miles (0.46 km^{2}), or 12.14%, are water. The terrain is hilly and tree-covered, with large grassy areas on the west side.

Interstate 35 forms the eastern edge of the community, and Missouri Route 33 runs north-south less than one mile west of the community. The subdivision has lakes, ponds, boating, fishing, beaches, swimming, picnic areas, camping lots, a community center, rentals, and residential homes. There is no commercial development company active at the subdivision.

== Demographics ==
Historical population
| Census | Pop. | Note | %± |
|---|---|---|---|
| 2020 | 363 | | — |
U.S. Decennial Census

Lake Arrowhead first appeared as a census designated place in the 2020 U.S. census.

== Lakes ==
All boats require a current decal. A Missouri fishing permit is required.

There are three lakes varying in size:

- Lake Arrowhead is the largest at 101 acres. It has three boat ramps, two docks, one beach and four public use areas.
- Spring Lake is a mid-sized fishing lake, offering two public use areas with two beaches. Small fishing boats with under 10 hp motors are allowed.
- Aspen Lake is the smallest lake offering a public use area with swimming beach. No motorized boats are allowed.

== Community property ==
The homeowners association owns and maintains considerable common areas around the lakes for use by its property owners in good standing. The association maintains 26 miles (42 km) of gravel roads. Just inside by the main gate is the Community Building, which can be reserved for a variety of functions.

== Camping ==
Camper trailers, tents, and RVs are allowed in the subdivision homeowners' own lots only. There are no public use campgrounds, showers, or restrooms located within the subdivision.

== Education ==
The community is served by two school districts.

- Northside - Lathrop R-II School District
- Southside - Kearney R-1 School District
