= Maryland lidar availability =

Maryland is among the states in the US that is acquiring lidar data, complementing the National Lidar Dataset effort to acquire high resolution elevation data across the nation. The Maryland Department of Natural Resources coordinates with most counties in the state regarding acquisition specifications, post-processing quality control, and in some cases, distribution. However, in general each county initiates the lidar acquisition.

In the Spring of 2014, the Maryland Department of Information Technology announced the addition of several new LiDAR features to MD iMap, Maryland’s Mapping & GIS Data Portal. The Maryland Topography Server and Topography Viewer, hosted by the Eastern Shore Regional GIS Cooperative at Salisbury University have been created to provide open access to statewide elevation information for use in a variety of studies and applications. The Maryland Topography Server maintains the best available elevation data and provides image services in both county and statewide extents. The Maryland Topography Viewer is a web application that allows users to view and interact with the elevation services hosted on the Topography Server. Users can view, query and more on desktop and mobile devices. MD iMap provides access to the Topography Server and Viewer as well as status maps, FAQs, metadata, and more.

Maryland county lidar sources include:

County	Main sources for county-wide lidar data
Anne Arundel	via DNR via NOAA
Baltimore County	contact BaltCo GIS Office
Caroline	via DNR via NOAA
Cecil	via DNR via NOAA
Charles	via DNR via NOAA
Dorchester	via DNR via NOAA
Howard	via DNR via NOAA
Kent	via DNR via NOAA
Montgomery	contact MontCo GIS Office
Prince George's	Underway: see MNCPPC 2009 Contract
Queen Anne's	via DNR via NOAA
St. Mary's	via DNR via NOAA
Somerset	via DNR via NOAA
Talbot	via DNR via NOAA
Wicomico	via DNR via NOAA
Worcester	via DNR
