= National Lidar Dataset (United States) =

U.S. Public availability for LiDAR systems

Currently, the best source for nationwide LiDAR availability from public sources is the United States Interagency Elevation Inventory (USIEI). The USIEI is a collaborative effort of NOAA and the U.S. Geological Survey, with contributions from the Federal Emergency Management Agency, the Natural Resources Conservation Service, the US Army Corps of Engineers, and the National Park Service. The inventory displays high-accuracy topographic and bathymetric data for the US, and it is intended to be a comprehensive, nationwide listing of known high-accuracy topographic data, including lidar. The inventory is updated semi-annually. Note, however, that getting access to the data is often less than straightforward in the current implementation.

History: In the United States, the United States Geological Survey (USGS) was the lead agency coordinating efforts across multiple agencies towards a National LIDAR Dataset. The first meeting, a National LIDAR Initiative Strategy Meeting, was held at USGS headquarters in Reston, Virginia in February 2007. In May 2008 a second meeting was held, co-sponsored by USGS, NASA, and the Association of American State Geologists. In 2009, several sessions at the annual American Society for Photogrammetry and Remote Sensing meeting were devoted to this initiative.

The USGS website remains a central source for information about the national initiative, and it includes presentation materials from the various meetings about the subject. This site also discusses how the USGS incorporates LIDAR data into the National Elevation Dataset. In addition to USGS and NASA, numerous government agencies have indicated their interest in such a project, including National Geospatial-Intelligence Agency (NGA), the Federal Emergency Management Agency (FEMA), US Army Corps of Engineers, NOAA, and NRCS.

While there is consensus at a federal level supporting the creation of a National LIDAR Dataset, key aspects remain unresolved, including funding, data specifications, and the delineation of agency roles and responsibilities. While these issues are pending, the following states are among those moving forward with their own statewide LIDAR datasets:

State	Dataset Status	Source
Alaska	Partial	Alaska DGGS Elevation Portal
Connecticut	Complete (med-res)	CT Lidar 10' DEM; see also this news
Delaware	Complete	Delaware Spatial Data Framework
Florida	Partial	LiDAR and Digital Elevation Data - Florida Disaster
Idaho	Partial	Idaho LiDAR Consortium
Illinois	Partial	Illinois Height Modernization (ILHMP): LiDAR Data
Indiana	Completed	Indiana Spatial Data Portal
Iowa	Complete	IA GeoTree Lidar Mapping Project
Kansas	Partial	Kansas GIS/DASC
Kentucky	Partial	Metadata, Grid and 5ft DEMs
Louisiana	~Complete	Louisiana Atlas
Maryland	Partial	MD iMap, MD DNR LiDAR, or NOAA
Massachusetts	Partial - Boston area only	Available for purchase from MassGIS
Minnesota	Complete	MN Lidar Status
New Hampshire	Partial	GRANIT/Coastal data
New Jersey	Partial	NJ Lidar Status
New York	Partial	NYS Lidar Coverage, or NYS Orthos
North Carolina	Complete	NC Floodmapping Program; NCDOT Elevation Data
North Dakota	Partial	ND LIDAR Dissemination Mapservice
Ohio	Complete	Ohio Statewide Imagery Program
Oregon	Partial	Oregon Lidar Consortium
Pennsylvania	Complete	PAMAP Program LiDAR
South Carolina	Partial	SC Lidar Consortium
Tennessee	Partial	GIS Data
Texas	Partial	Elevation – Lidar - Texas Geographic Information Office
Utah	Partial	UT Lidar datasets
Vermont	Partial	VCGI
Virginia	Partial	Virginia GIS Clearinghouse Apps & Maps - VGIN
Washington		Washington Lidar Portal
West Virginia	Partial	WV Elevation and LIDAR Download Tool
Wisconsin	In progress	WI: 14 counties
Wyoming	In progress	Wyoming Statewide LIDAR Effort

Regardless of the degree of state coordination, some counties choose to handle (and control) high-resolution LiDAR acquisition and distribution on their own. Such counties include:

State	County
Arkansas	Benton · Washington
California	Los Angeles · Marin · Orange · Sonoma
Florida	Brevard · Broward · Clay · Escambia · Gulf · Holmes · Indian River · Jefferson · Lee · Leon · Okaloosa · Putnam · St. Johns · St Johns GIS · Santa Rosa · Wakulla · Walton
Georgia	Baldwin · Barrow · Burke · Clarke · Columbia · Cook · Fayette · Floyd · Fulton · Glynn · Hancock · Lincoln · Madison · Morgan · Oconee · Oglethorpe · Paulding · Polk · Putnam · Richmond · Tift · White
Hawaii	Oahu
Illinois	Macon · McLean · Ogle
Indiana	Delaware · Kosciusko
Iowa	Scott
Kansas	Douglas · Harvey · Jefferson · Johnson · Shawnee
Kentucky	Bullitt · Jefferson · Oldham
Maryland	Baltimore · Montgomery
Michigan	Dickison · Livingston · Macomb · Monroe · Oakland · Ottawa · St Clair · Washtenaw · Wayne
Minnesota	Dakota · Dodge · Fillmore · Freeborn · Goodhue · Houston · Hubbard · McLeod · Mower · Ramsey · Olmsted · Rice · Steele · Wabasha · Winona · Wright
Missouri	Carroll · Cass · Chariton · Clay · Greene · Jackson · Lafayette · Linn · Montgomery · Platte · Saline · Scott · St Charles · Stone · Taney
Mississippi	Pearl River · Pearl River GIS
Nevada	Douglas
New Jersey	Cape May · Cumberland · Gloucester · Hunterdon· Kent · Middlesex · Morris · New Castle · Somerset
New York	Broome · Cayuga · Monroe · Ontario
Oregon	Coos · Josephine
Tennessee	Hamilton · Rutherford
Texas	Brazoria · Collins · Denton · Harris · Kaufman · Nueces · Travis · Williamson
Vermont	Essex · Chittenden
Washington	Clark · Kitsap · King · Mason · See Puget Sound LIDAR Consortium for additional counties
West Virginia	Gilmer · Jefferson · Wyoming
Wisconsin	Door · Milwaukee · Ozaukee · Washington
