= Sweet Home, Missouri =

Extinct community in Missouri, U.S.

Coordinates: 40°21′03″N 94°38′51″W

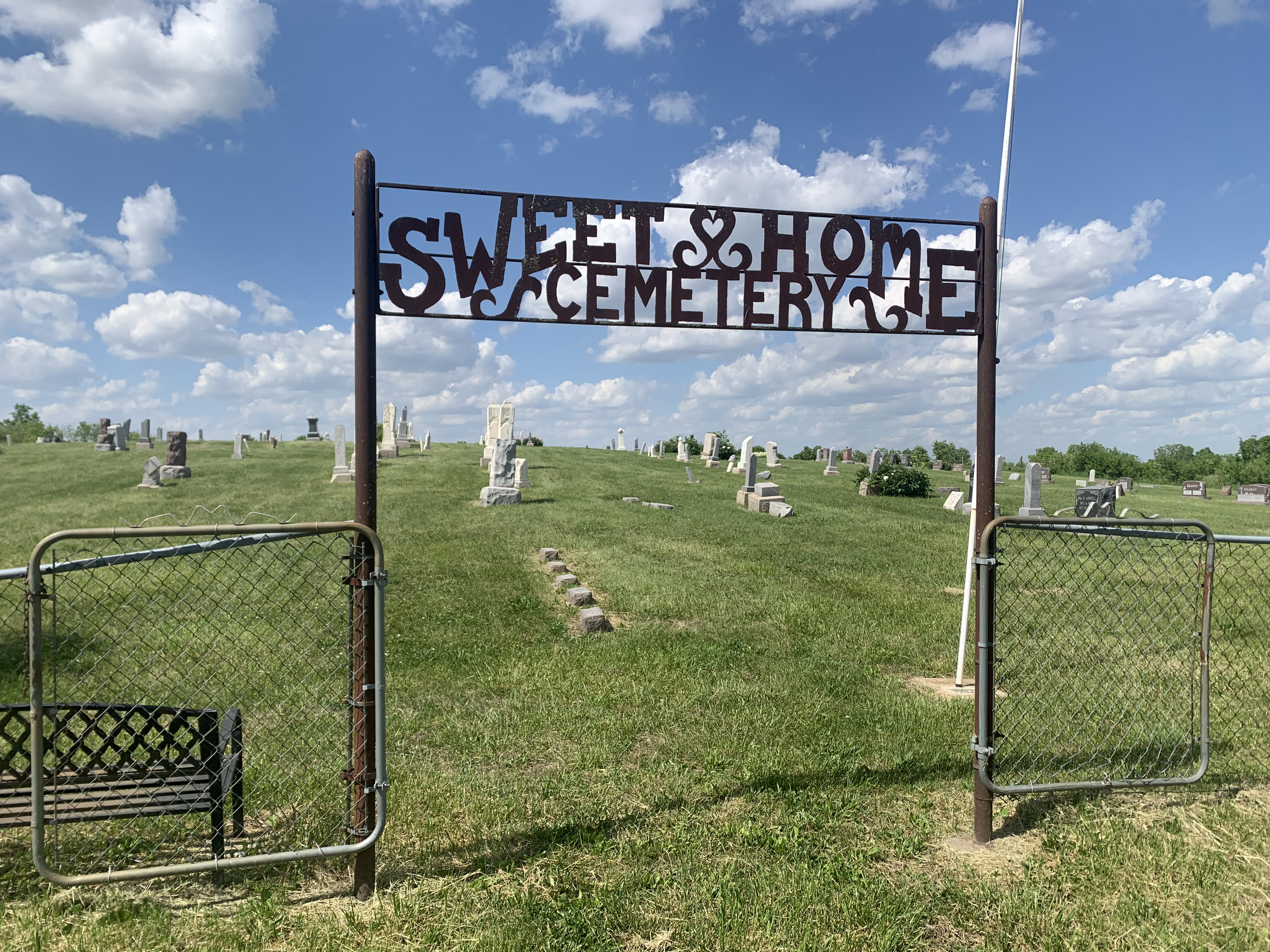
Sweet Home cemetery northeast of Ravenwood, Missouri

Sweet Home is an extinct hamlet in Nodaway County, Missouri, in the United States. It was situated 12 miles east of Maryville and 2.5 miles east of the Platte River. Other sources erroneously place Sweet Home west of the Platte River.

A post office named Sweet Home was established in 1864, and was the first town in Jackson Township. With the establishment of Ravenwood, Missouri in the 1880s the hamlet diminished. The post office was closed in 1890.
