= Hughes House (Jefferson, Pennsylvania) =

Historic house in Pennsylvania, United States

- U.S. National Register of Historic Places
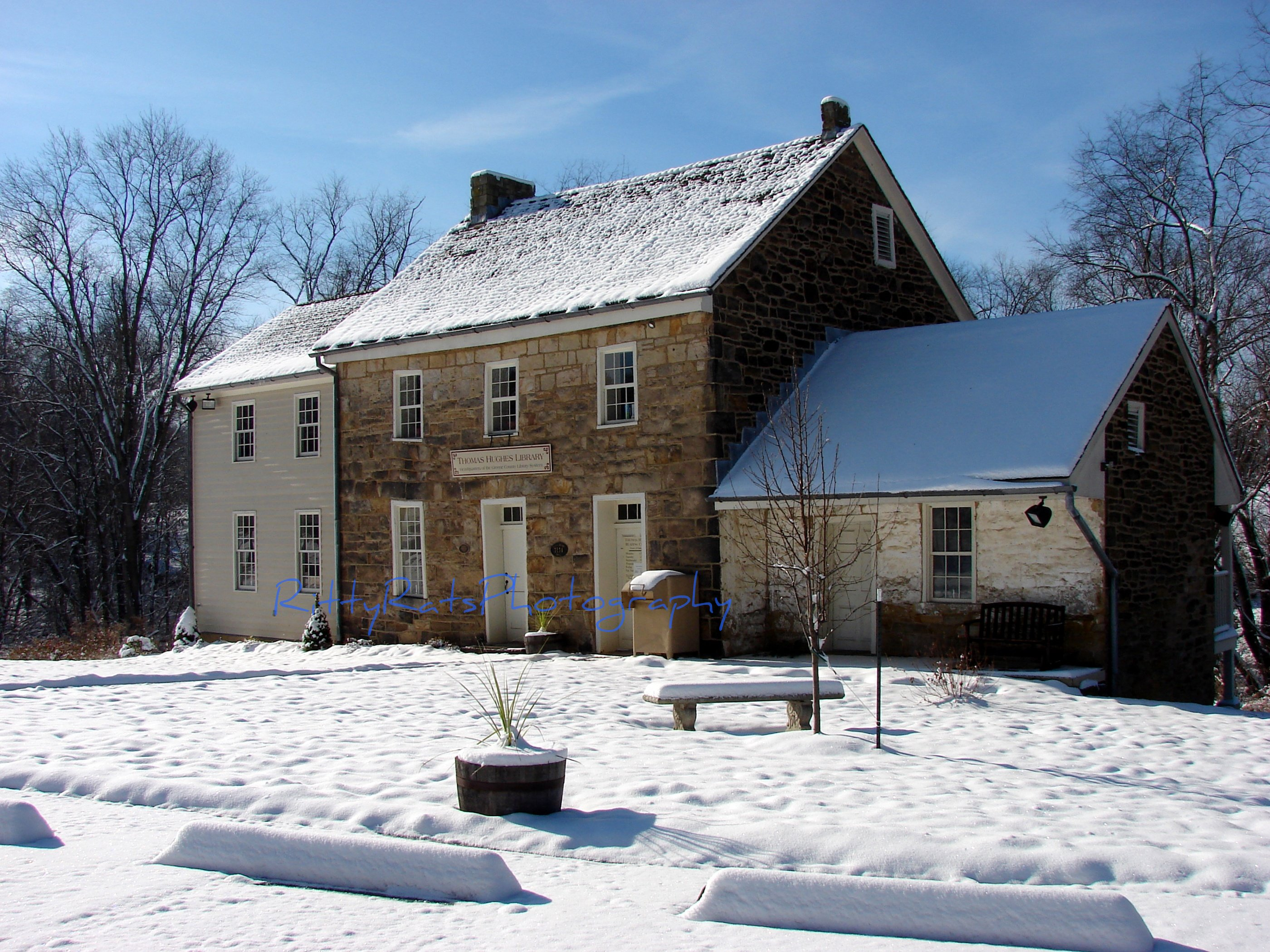
- Hughes House, December 2007

- Location within Pennsylvania Location within the United States
- Location: Hatfield St., north of Jefferson, Jefferson Township, Pennsylvania
- Coordinates: 39°55′58″N 80°3′36″W
- Area: 1.8 acres (0.73 ha)
- Built: 1814
- NRHP reference No.: 72001124
- Added to NRHP: December 27, 1972

Hughes House is a historic home located at Jefferson Township in Greene County, Pennsylvania. It was built in 1814, and is a 2 1/2-story, three-bay, banked stone dwelling. It has a small, 1 1/2-story extension and a steeply pitched gable roof.

It was listed on the National Register of Historic Places in 1972.
