= John Rex Farm =

Historic house in Pennsylvania, United States

- U.S. National Register of Historic Places
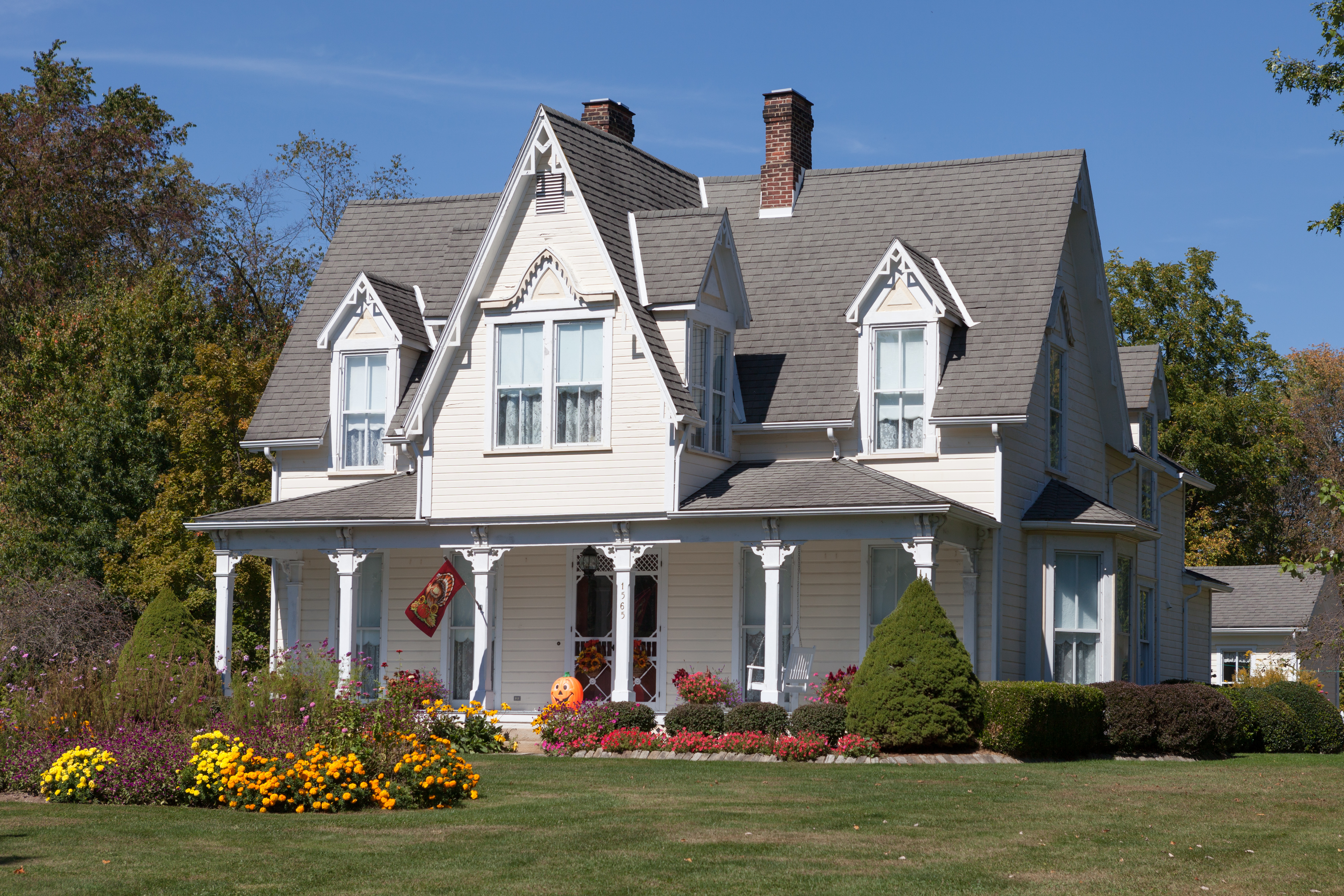
- The main house in September 2014

- Location within Pennsylvania Location within the United States
- Location: 0.5 mi. E of Jefferson on PA 188, Jefferson Township, Pennsylvania
- Coordinates: 39°56′16″N 80°2′54″W
- Area: 71 acres (29 ha)
- Built: c. 1874
- Architectural style: Gothic Revival
- NRHP reference No.: 98000443
- Added to NRHP: May 8, 1998

The John Rex Farm, also known as the Goodwin/Strickler Farm, is an historic home and farm that are located in Jefferson Township in Greene County, Pennsylvania, United States.

It was listed on the National Register of Historic Places in 1998.

== History and architectural features ==
The main house was built circa 1874, and is a 1 1/2-story, frame dwelling with a steeply pitched gable roof. Designed in the Gothic Revival style, this house was renovated in 1990, at which time a full basement was added. Also located on the property are the contributing summer kitchen (c. 1865), barn (c. 1870), carriage house (c. 1870), smokehouse (c. 1870), and a wrought iron fence (c. 1910).
