= William Cree House =

Historic house in Pennsylvania, United States

- U.S. National Register of Historic Places
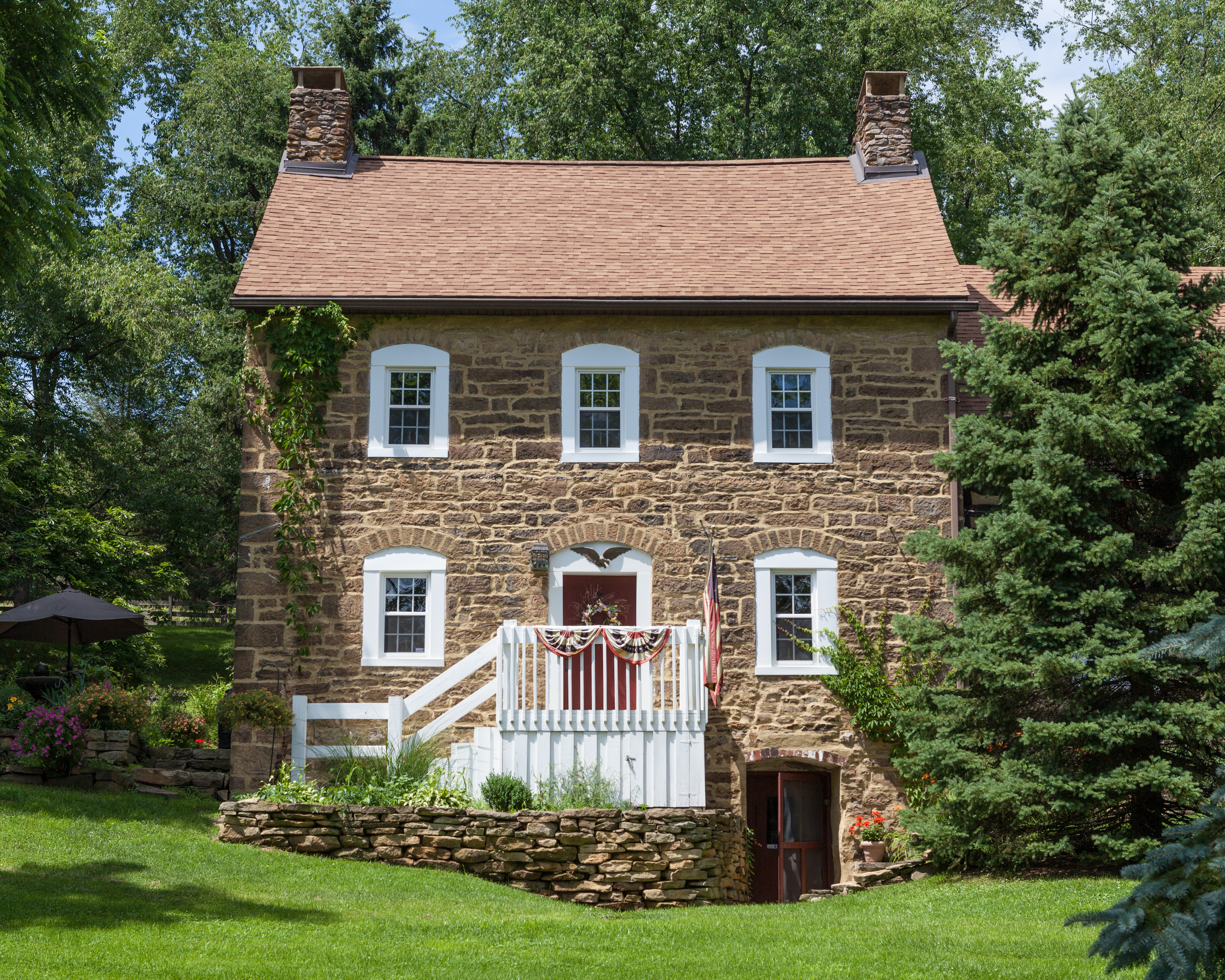
- Front of the house, June 2014

- Location within Pennsylvania Location within the United States
- Location: W side of PA 1011, 0.1 mi. N of PA 21, Jefferson Township, Pennsylvania
- Coordinates: 39°53′29″N 80°2′46″W
- Area: 1 acre (0.40 ha)
- Architectural style: Stone cabin
- NRHP reference No.: 01000678
- Added to NRHP: July 15, 2002

William Cree House is a historic home located at Jefferson Township in Greene County, Pennsylvania. It was built in 1792, and is a two-story, three-bay, banked stone dwelling. A two-story, log house built in 1847, was moved and attached to the house about 1974. Also on the property is a banked stone spring house built in 1782.

It was listed on the National Register of Historic Places in 2002.
