= Jackson Township, Newton County, Arkansas =

Jackson Township
- Township
- Location in Arkansas Jackson Township (the United States)
- Coordinates: 36°00′10″N 93°10′50″W
- Country: United States
- State: Arkansas
- County: Newton

Area
  - Total: 59.933 sq mi (155.23 km^{2})
  - Land: 59.573 sq mi (154.29 km^{2})
  - Water: 0.360 sq mi (0.93 km^{2})
- Elevation: 994 ft (303 m)

Population (2010)
  - Total: 1,620
  - Density: 27.2/sq mi (10.5/km^{2})
- Time zone: UTC-6 (CST)
  - Summer (DST): UTC-5 (CDT)
- FIPS code: 05-91872
- GNIS ID: 69678

Jackson Township is a township in Newton County, Arkansas, United States. Its total population was 1,620 as of the 2010 United States census, an increase of 1.76 percent from 1,592 at the 2000 census.

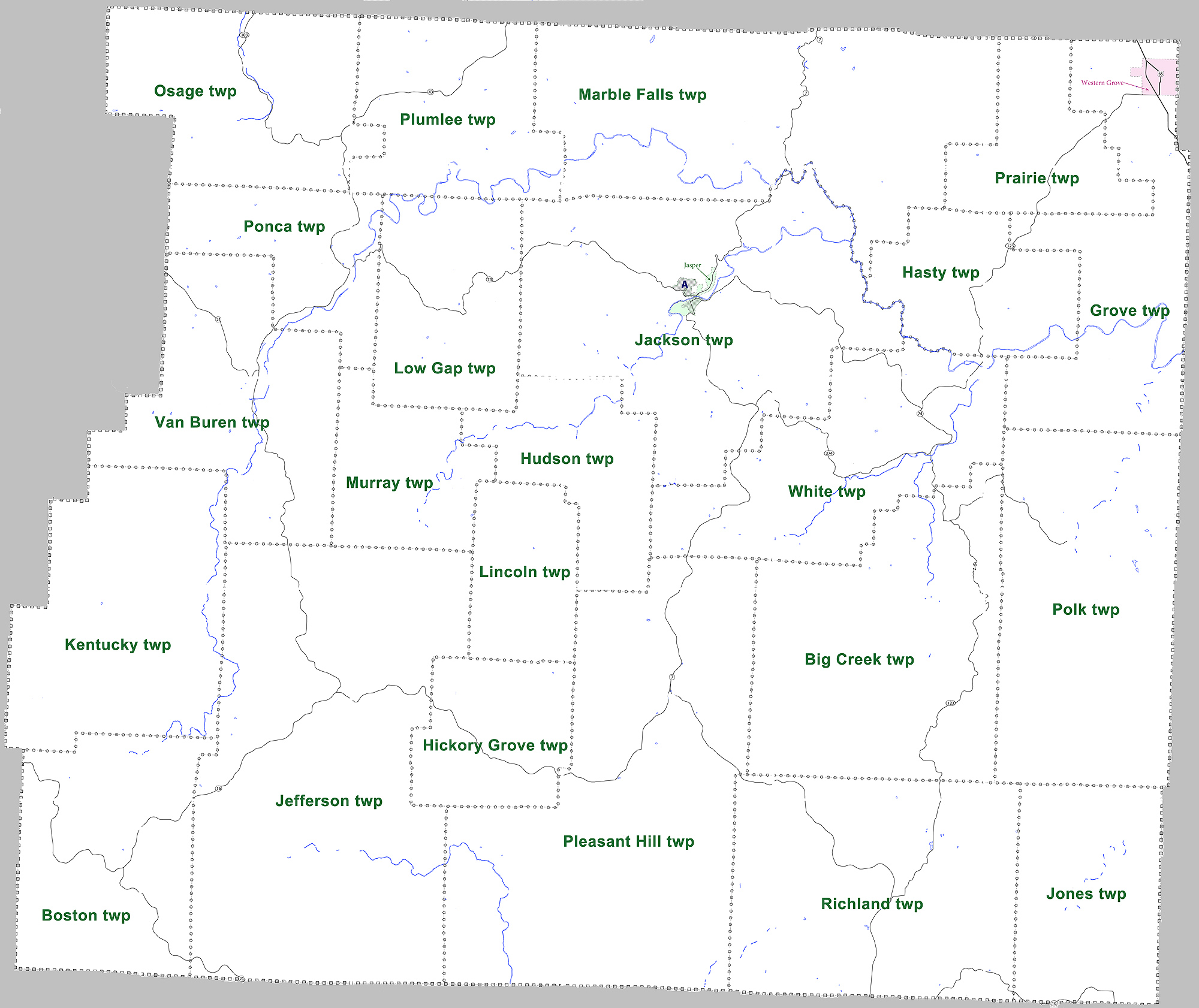
Townships in Newton County as of 2010

According to the 2010 Census, Jackson Township is located at 36°00′10″N 93°10′50″W (36.002703, -93.180608). It has a total area of 59.933 square miles (155.23 square kilometers); of which 59.573 sq mi (154.29 km^{2}) is land and 0.360 sq mi (0.93 km^{2}) is water (0.60%). As per the USGS National Elevation Dataset, the elevation is 994 feet (303 m).

The city of Jasper is located within the township.
