= Jackson Township, Buchanan County, Missouri =

Township in Buchanan County, Missouri, U.S.

Jackson Township
- Township
- Coordinates: 39°34′14″N 94°43′46″W
- Country: United States
- State: Missouri
- County: Buchanan

Area
  - Total: 22.17 sq mi (57.4 km^{2})
  - Land: 21.85 sq mi (56.6 km^{2})
  - Water: 0.32 sq mi (0.83 km^{2}) 1.44%
- Elevation: 932 ft (284 m)

Population (2020)
  - Total: 541
  - Density: 24.8/sq mi (9.6/km^{2})
- FIPS code: 29-02135594
- GNIS feature ID: 766340

Jackson Township is a township in Buchanan County, Missouri, United States. At the 2020 census, its population was 541.

Jackson Township was erected in 1843, and named after President Andrew Jackson.

== Geography ==
Carli Jackson Township covers an area of 21.99 square miles (57.0 km^{2}) and contains no incorporated settlements. It contains three cemeteries: Brinton, Mount Pleasant and Yates.

Benner Lake is within this township.

== Transportation ==
The following highways travel through the township:

- Route 116
- Route DD
- Route F
- Route MM
- Route Y
