= Jackson Township, Crittenden County, Arkansas =

Jackson Township
- Township
- Location in Arkansas Jackson Township (the United States)
- Coordinates: 35°12′22″N 90°20′04″W
- Country: United States
- State: Arkansas
- County: Crittenden

Area
  - Total: 57.587 sq mi (149.15 km^{2})
  - Land: 57.587 sq mi (149.15 km^{2})
  - Water: 0.000 sq mi (0 km^{2})
- Elevation: 213 ft (65 m)

Population (2010)
  - Total: 1,352
  - Density: 23.48/sq mi (9.065/km^{2})
- Time zone: UTC-6 (CST)
  - Summer (DST): UTC-5 (CDT)
- FIPS code: 05-91857
- GNIS ID: 68748

Jackson Township is a township in Crittenden County, Arkansas, United States. Its total population was 1,352 as of the 2010 United States census, a decrease of 1.24 percent from 1,369 at the 2000 census.

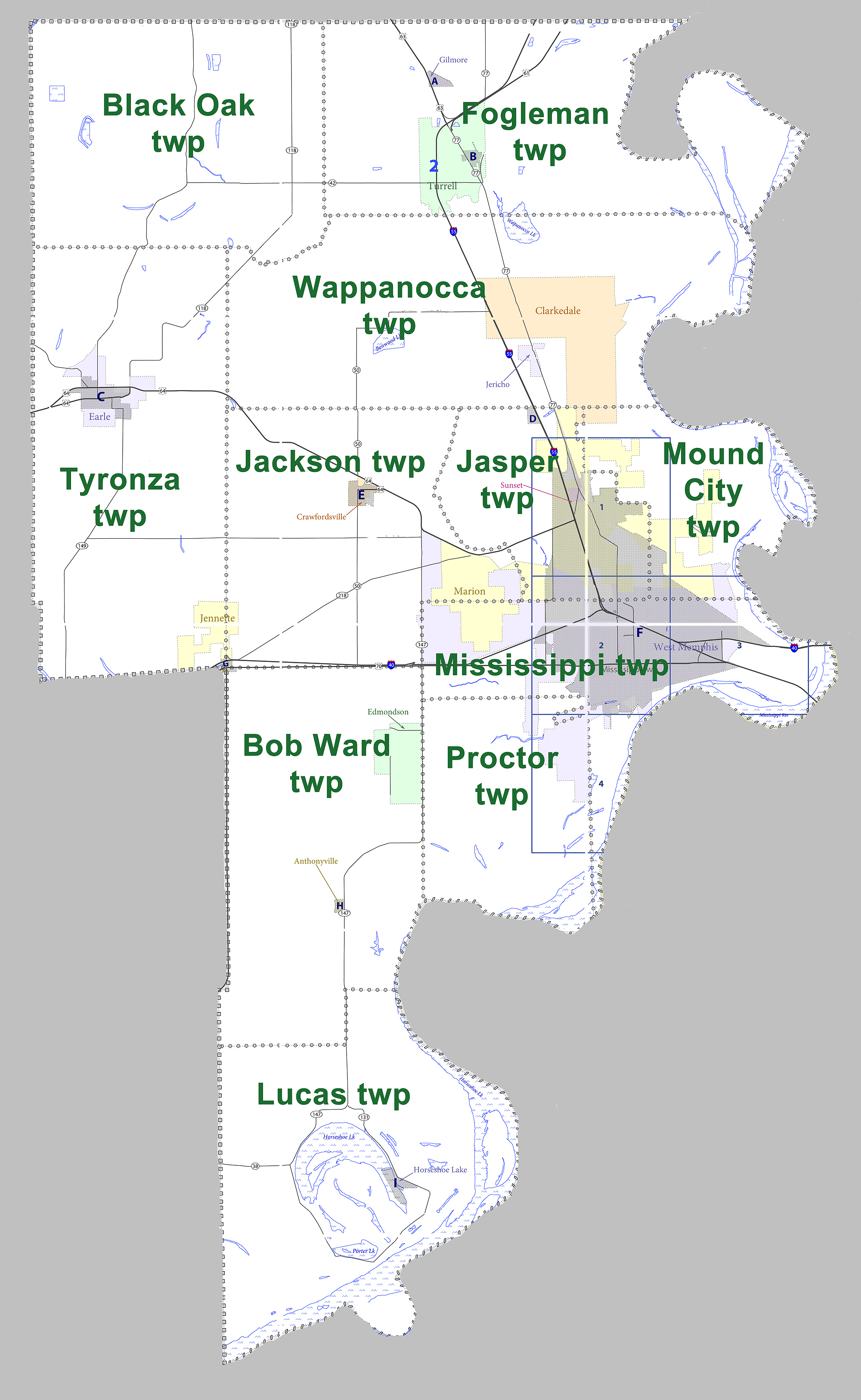
Townships in Crittenden County as of 2010

According to the 2010 Census, Jackson Township is located at 35°12′22″N 90°20′04″W (35.206155, -90.334483). It has a total area of 57.587 square miles (149.15 square kilometers); all of which is land. As per the USGS National Elevation Dataset, the elevation is 213 feet (65 m).

Crawfordsville, and parts of Marion, West Memphis, and Jennette are located within the township.
