= Jackson Township, Carter County, Missouri =

Township in the US state of Missouri

Coordinates: 36.9900°N 90.7956°W

Jackson Township is a township in Carter County, in the U.S. state of Missouri.

Jackson Township was established in 1873, taking its name from President Andrew Jackson.
