= Jackson Township, Johnson County, Missouri =

Township in Johnson County, Missouri, U.S.

Coordinates: 38.8541445°N 94.0299018°W

Jackson Township is an inactive township in Johnson County, in the U.S. state of Missouri.

Jackson Township was established in 1835, taking its name from President Andrew Jackson. There is also the local Basin Knob Church, named after Basin Knob, a hill which is a mile northwest of the settlement.
