= Jackson Township, Camden County, Missouri =

Jackson Township
- Township
- Coordinates: 37°57′57″N 092°30′46″W
- Country: United States
- State: Missouri
- County: Camden

Area
  - Total: 56.76 sq mi (147.02 km^{2})
  - Land: 55.48 sq mi (143.69 km^{2})
  - Water: 1.29 sq mi (3.33 km^{2}) 2.26%
- Elevation: 902 ft (275 m)

Population (2000)
  - Total: 663
  - Density: 12/sq mi (4.6/km^{2})
- FIPS code: 29-35630
- GNIS feature ID: 0766390

Jackson Township is one of eleven townships in Camden County, Missouri, USA. As of the 2000 census, its population was 663.

Jackson Township was established in 1841, and named after Andrew Jackson.

== Geography ==
Jackson Township covers an area of 56.77 square miles (147.0 km^{2}) and contains no incorporated settlements. It contains one cemetery, Auglaize.

The streams of Coon Creek, Dry Auglaize Creek, Honey Run and Wet Glaize Creek run through this township.
