= Jackson Township, Shelby County, Missouri =

Township in Shelby County, Missouri, U.S.

Coordinates: 39.7289°N 91.9078°W

Jackson Township is an inactive township in Shelby County, in the U.S. state of Missouri.

Jackson Township was erected in the 1837, taking its name from President Andrew Jackson.
