= Jackson Township, Callaway County, Missouri =

Township in the American state of Missouri

Jackson Township
- Township
- Coordinates: 39°01′01″N 091°52′38″W
- Country: United States
- State: Missouri
- County: Callaway

Area
  - Total: 64.7 sq mi (167.7 km^{2})
  - Land: 64.49 sq mi (167.04 km^{2})
  - Water: 0.25 sq mi (0.66 km^{2}) 0.39%
- Elevation: 860 ft (262 m)

Population (2010)
  - Total: 2,150
  - Density: 33.3/sq mi (12.9/km^{2})
- FIPS code: 29-35612
- GNIS feature ID: 0766379

Jackson Township is one of eighteen townships in Callaway County, Missouri, USA. As of the 2010 census, its population was 2,150.

== History ==
Jackson Township was created December 25, 1875 from the former northeastern sector of Liberty Township and the northwestern sector of Nine Mile Prairie Township—as one can see by comparing the 1867 and 1897 maps of Callaway County townships. This took the city of Auxvasse, out of Liberty Township and put it in the new Jackson Township. This is especially significant for historical and genealogical research.

== Geography ==
Jackson Township covers an area of 64.75 square miles (167.7 km^{2}) and contains one incorporated settlement, Auxvasse. It contains four cemeteries: Auxvasse, Grand Prairie, Harrison and Pleasant Grove.

The streams of Bynum Creek, Hunt Branch, Smith Branch and Yates Branch run through this township.
