= Jackson Township, Maries County, Missouri =

Township in Maries County, Missouri, U.S.

Coordinates: 38.2128°N 91.9294°W

Jackson Township is an inactive township in Maries County, in the U.S. state of Missouri.

Jackson Township has the name of Jackson Terrill, a local judge.
