= Jackson Township, Monroe County, Missouri =

Township in Monroe County, Missouri, U.S.

Coordinates: 39.4558°N 92.0139°W

Jackson Township is an inactive township in Monroe County, in the U.S. state of Missouri.

Jackson Township was established in 1831, taking its name from President Andrew Jackson.
