= Jackson Township, Clark County, Missouri =

Township in Clark County, Missouri, U.S.

Coordinates: 40.317217°N 91.665014°W

Jackson Township is an inactive township in Clark County, in the U.S. state of Missouri.

== History ==
Jackson Township has the name of President Andrew Jackson.
