= Jackson Township, Webster County, Missouri =

Inactive township in the US state of Missouri

Coordinates: 37.4389°N 93.0269°W

Jackson Township is an inactive township in Webster County, in the U.S. state of Missouri.

Jackson Township was erected in 1884, taking its name from Andrew Jackson, 7th President of the United States.
