= Jackson Township, Ozark County, Missouri =

Township in Ozark County, Missouri, U.S.

Coordinates: 36.7639°N 92.4003°W

Jackson Township is an inactive township in Ozark County, in the U.S. state of Missouri.

Jackson Township was established in 1860, taking its name from Andrew Jackson, 7th President of the United States.
