= Jackson Township, Shannon County, Missouri =

Defunct township in the US state of Missouri

Coordinates: 37.3906011°N 91.5740333°W

Jackson Township is a defunct township in Shannon County, in the U.S. state of Missouri.

Jackson Township was erected in 1870, taking its name from Claiborne Fox Jackson, 15th Governor of Missouri.
