= Jackson Township, Grundy County, Missouri =

Township in Grundy County, Missouri, U.S.

Coordinates: 39.9987321°N 93.5627494°W

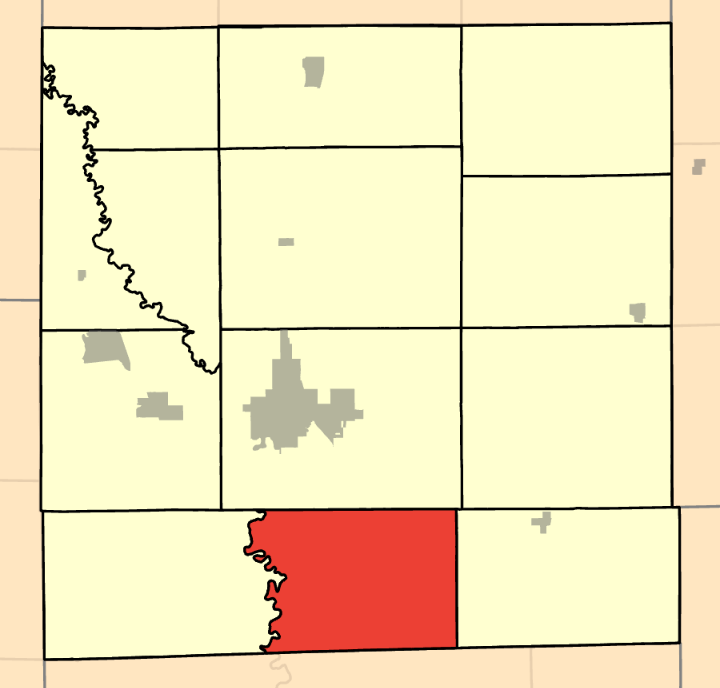

Jackson Township is a township in Grundy County, in the U.S. state of Missouri.

Jackson Township has the name of Andrew Jackson, 7th President of the United States.
