= Jackson Township, Osage County, Missouri =

Inactive township in the U.S. state of Missouri

Coordinates: 38.3721335°N 92.0990089°W

Jackson Township is an inactive township in Osage County, in the U.S. state of Missouri.

Jackson Township was erected in 1841, taking its name from Andrew Jackson, 7th President of the United States.
