= Jackson Township, Randolph County, Missouri =

Inactive township in the US state of Missouri

Coordinates: 39.5811°N 92.4678°W

Jackson Township is an inactive township in Randolph County, in the U.S. state of Missouri.

Jackson Township has the name of Hancock Jackson, a pioneer citizen, and afterward 13th Governor of Missouri.
