= Jackson Township, Randolph County, Arkansas =

Jackson Township
- Township
- Location in Arkansas Jackson Township (the United States)
- Coordinates: 36°25′03″N 91°05′13″W
- Country: United States
- State: Arkansas
- County: Randolph

Area
  - Total: 17.728 sq mi (45.92 km^{2})
  - Land: 17.669 sq mi (45.76 km^{2})
  - Water: 0.059 sq mi (0.15 km^{2})
- Elevation: 479 ft (146 m)

Population (2010)
  - Total: 241
  - Density: 13.6/sq mi (5.27/km^{2})
- Time zone: UTC-6 (CST)
  - Summer (DST): UTC-5 (CDT)
- FIPS code: 05-91878
- GNIS ID: 69026

Jackson Township is a township in Randolph County, Arkansas, United States. Its total population was 241 as of the 2010 United States census, a decrease of 10.41 percent from 269 in 2000.

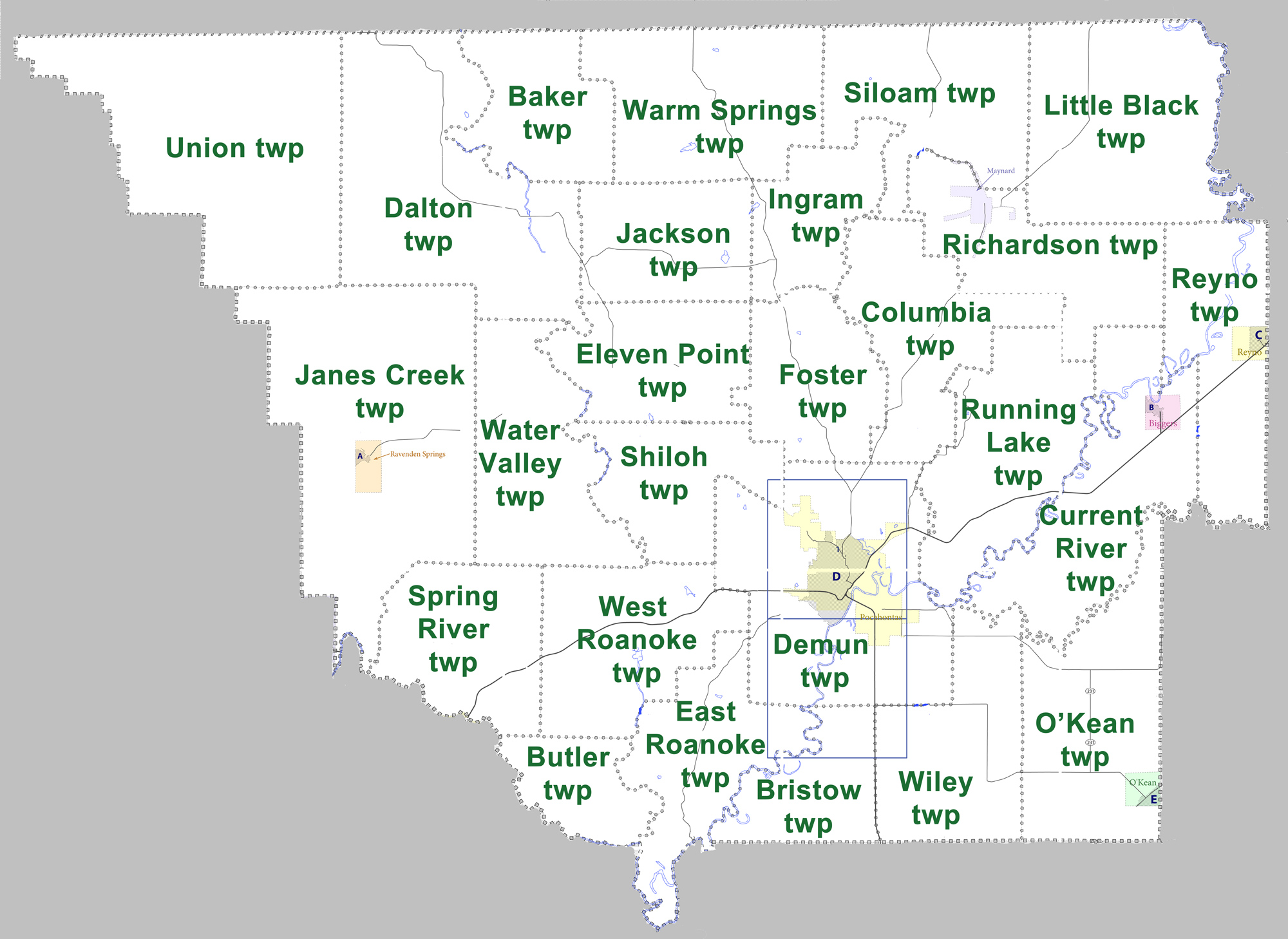
Townships in Randolph County as of 2010

According to the 2010 Census, Jackson Township is located at 36°25′03″N 91°05′13″W (36.417455, -91.086920). It has a total area of 17.728 square miles (45.92 square kilometers); of which 17.669 sq mi (45.76 km^{2}) is land and 0.059 sq mi (0.15 km^{2}) is water (0.33%). As per the USGS National Elevation Dataset, the elevation is 479 feet (146 m).
