= Jackson Township, Putnam County, Missouri =

Township in Putnam County, Missouri, U.S.

Coordinates: 40.43°N 93.12°W

Jackson Township is a township in southern Putnam County, Missouri.

The organization date and origin of the name of Jackson Township is unknown.
