= Jackson Township, Monroe County, Arkansas =

Jackson Township
- Township
- Location in Arkansas Jackson Township (the United States)
- Coordinates: 34°31′23″N 91°10′58″W
- Country: United States
- State: Arkansas
- County: Monroe

Area
  - Total: 61.369 sq mi (158.94 km^{2})
  - Land: 59.665 sq mi (154.53 km^{2})
  - Water: 1.704 sq mi (4.41 km^{2})
- Elevation: 167 ft (51 m)

Population (2020)
  - Total: 120
  - Density: 2.0/sq mi (0.78/km^{2})
- Time zone: UTC-6 (CST)
  - Summer (DST): UTC-5 (CDT)
- FIPS code: 05-91866
- GNIS ID: 68874

Jackson Township is a township in Monroe County, Arkansas, United States. Its total population was 120 as of the 2020 United States census.

Its total population was 121 in 2010, a decrease of 45.50 percent from 222 in 2000.

According to the 2010 Census, Jackson Township is located at 34°31′23″N 91°10′58″W (34.522922, -91.182666). It has a total area of 61.369 square miles (158.94 square kilometers); of which 59.665 sq mi (154.53 km^{2}) is land and 1.704 sq mi (4.41 km^{2}) is water (2.78%). As per the USGS National Elevation Dataset, the elevation is 167 feet (51 m).

== Population ==
US Census Data
Year	Population
2020	120
2010	121
2000	222
