= Jackson Township, Union County, Arkansas =

Jackson Township
- Township
- Location in Arkansas Jackson Township (the United States)
- Coordinates: 33°03′07″N 92°37′33″W
- Country: United States
- State: Arkansas
- County: Union

Area
  - Total: 58.338 sq mi (151.09 km^{2})
  - Land: 58.116 sq mi (150.52 km^{2})
  - Water: 0.222 sq mi (0.57 km^{2})
- Elevation: 210 ft (64 m)

Population (2010)
  - Total: 758
  - Density: 13.0/sq mi (5.04/km^{2})
- Time zone: UTC-6 (CST)
  - Summer (DST): UTC-5 (CDT)
- FIPS code: 05-91884
- GNIS ID: 69750

Jackson Township is a township in Union County, Arkansas, United States. Its total population was 758 as of the 2010 United States census, a decrease of 1.56 percent from 770 at the 2000 census.

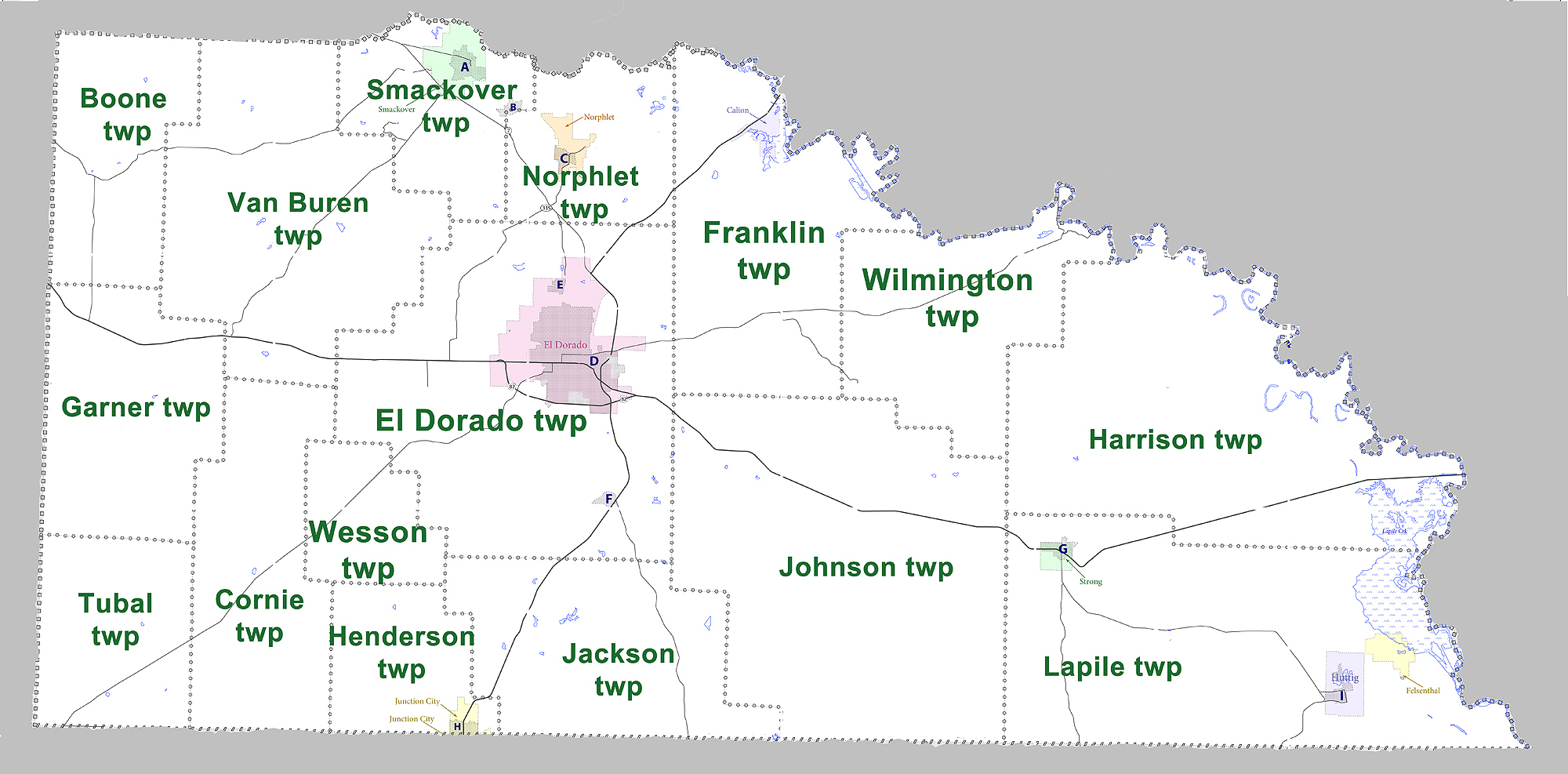
Townships in Union County as of 2010

According to the 2010 Census, Jackson Township is located at 33°03′07″N 92°37′33″W (33.051999, -92.625904). It has a total area of 58.338 square miles (151.09 square kilometers); of which 58.116 sq mi (150.52 km^{2}) is land and 0.222 sq mi (0.57 km^{2}) is water (0.38%). As per the USGS National Elevation Dataset, the elevation is 210 feet (64 m).
