= Jackson Township, Dallas County, Arkansas =

Jackson Township
- Township
- Location in Arkansas Jackson Township (the United States)
- Coordinates: 33°50′48″N 92°31′59″W
- Country: United States
- State: Arkansas
- County: Dallas

Area
  - Total: 35.844 sq mi (92.84 km^{2})
  - Land: 35.839 sq mi (92.82 km^{2})
  - Water: 0.005 sq mi (0.013 km^{2})
- Elevation: 292 ft (89 m)

Population (2010)
  - Total: 190
  - Density: 5.3/sq mi (2.0/km^{2})
- Time zone: UTC-6 (CST)
  - Summer (DST): UTC-5 (CDT)
- FIPS code: 05-91860
- GNIS ID: 66488

Jackson Township is a township in Dallas County, Arkansas, United States. Its total population was 190 as of the 2010 United States census, a decrease of 18.10 percent from 232 at the 2000 census.

According to the 2010 Census, Jackson Township is located at 33°50′48″N 92°31′59″W (33.846733, -92.532990). It has a total area of 35.844 square miles (92.84 square kilometers); of which 35.839 sq mi (92.82 km^{2}) is land and 0.005 sq mi (0.013 km^{2}) is water (0.01%). As per the USGS National Elevation Dataset, the elevation is 292 feet (89 m).
