= Jackson Township, Linn County, Missouri =

Township in Linn County, Missouri, U.S.

Coordinates: 39°58′47″N 93°17′28″W

Jackson Township is a township in Linn County, in the U.S. state of Missouri.

Jackson Township was established in 1845, and most likely was named after Andrew Jackson (1767–1845), a general in the War of 1812 and afterward 7th U.S. president.
