= Jackson Township, Venango County, Pennsylvania =

Township in Pennsylvania, US

Coordinates: 41°32′00″N 79°52′59″W

- Township
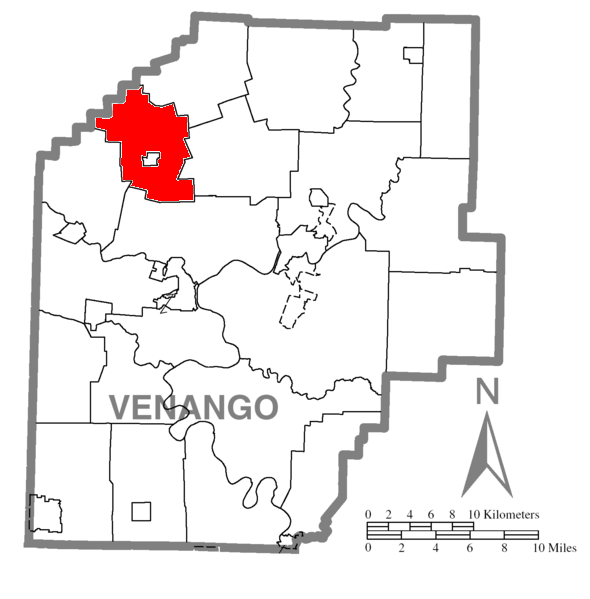
- Map of Venango County, Pennsylvania highlighting Jackson Township

- Map of Venango County, Pennsylvania
- Country: United States
- State: Pennsylvania
- County: Venango
- Settled: 1796
- Incorporated: 1845

Government
  - Type: Board of Supervisors

Area
  - Total: 24.70 sq mi (63.96 km^{2})
  - Land: 24.70 sq mi (63.96 km^{2})
  - Water: 0 sq mi (0.00 km^{2})

Population (2020)
  - Total: 915 ▼
  - Estimate (2024): 936
  - Density: 46.2/sq mi (17.84/km^{2})
- Time zone: UTC-5 (Eastern (EST))
  - Summer (DST): UTC-4 (EDT)
- Area code: 814
- FIPS code: 42-121-37480

Jackson Township is a township in Venango County, Pennsylvania, United States. The population was 915 at the 2020 census, a decrease from 1,147 in 2010, which represented, in turn, a decline from 1,168 as of the 2000 census.

== Geography ==
According to the United States Census Bureau, the township has a total area of 24.7 square miles (64 km^{2}), all land.

== Demographics ==
Historical population
Census	Pop.	Note	%±
2000	1,168		—
2010	1,147		−1.8%
2020	915		−20.2%
2024 (est.)	936		2.3%
U.S. Decennial Census

As of the census of 2000, there were 1,168 people, 422 households, and 337 families residing in the township. The population density was 47.3 inhabitants per square mile (18.3/km^{2}). There were 473 housing units at an average density of 19.2/sq mi (7.4/km^{2}). The racial makeup of the township was 98.12% White, 0.26% African American, 0.26% Native American, 0.17% Asian, 0.17% from other races, and 1.03% from two or more races. Hispanic or Latino of any race were 0.09% of the population.

There were 422 households, out of which 37.0% had children under the age of 18 living with them, 66.1% were married couples living together, 8.8% had a female householder with no husband present, and 20.1% were non-families. 16.4% of all households were made up of individuals, and 6.9% had someone living alone who was 65 years of age or older. The average household size was 2.77 and the average family size was 3.07.

In the township the population was spread out, with 28.1% under the age of 18, 9.4% from 18 to 24, 28.8% from 25 to 44, 23.5% from 45 to 64, and 10.2% who were 65 years of age or older. The median age was 36 years. For every 100 females, there were 97.6 males. For every 100 females age 18 and over, there were 99.5 males.

The median income for a household in the township was $34,338, and the median income for a family was $37,202. Males had a median income of $30,357 versus $19,559 for females. The per capita income for the township was $13,644. About 12.8% of families and 13.7% of the population were below the poverty line, including 17.6% of those under age 18 and 10.9% of those age 65 or over.
