= Jackson Township, St. Clair County, Missouri =

Township in St. Clair County, Missouri, U.S.

Coordinates: 38.1472°N 93.5694°W

Jackson Township is an inactive township in St. Clair County, Missouri, United States.

Jackson Township was erected in 1841, taking its name from President Andrew Jackson.
