= Jackson Township, Jasper County, Missouri =

Inactive township in the US state of Missouri

Coordinates: 37.1042737°N 94.3486198°W

Jackson Township is an inactive township in Jasper County, in the U.S. state of Missouri. It was named after President Andrew Jackson.
