= Jackson Township, Clinton County, Missouri =

Township in Clinton County, Missouri, U.S.

Jackson Township
- Township
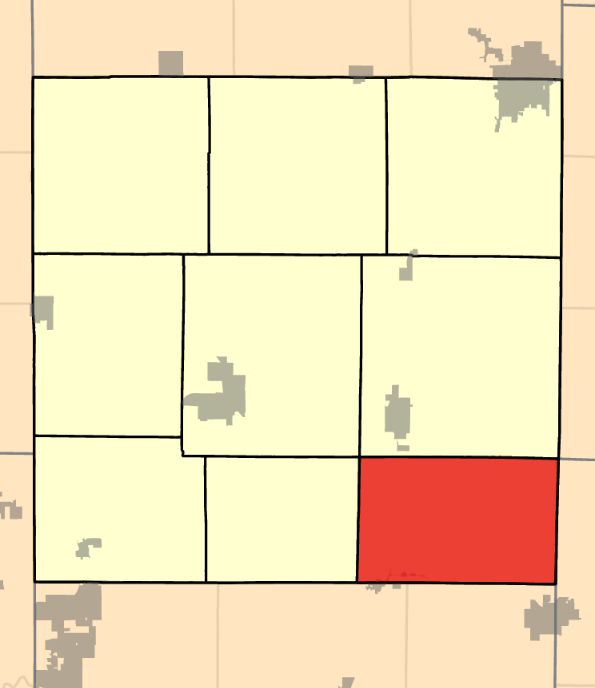
- Coordinates: 39°29′26″N 94°17′24″W
- Country: United States
- State: Missouri
- County: Clinton

Area
  - Total: 39.89 sq mi (103.3 km^{2})
  - Land: 39.69 sq mi (102.8 km^{2})
  - Water: 0.2 sq mi (0.52 km^{2}) 0.5%
- Elevation: 1,050 ft (320 m)

Population (2020)
  - Total: 3,078
  - Density: 77.6/sq mi (30.0/km^{2})
- FIPS code: 29-04935702
- GNIS feature ID: 766515

Jackson Township is a township in Clinton County, Missouri, United States. At the 2020 census, its population was 3,078. It contains the census-designated place of Lake Arrowhead.

Jackson Township was established in 1833, and named after President Andrew Jackson.
