= Jackson Township, Dallas County, Missouri =

Township in Dallas County, Missouri, U.S.

Coordinates: 37.531463°N 93.097321°W

Jackson Township is an inactive township in Dallas County, in the U.S. state of Missouri.

Jackson Township was founded in 1841, taking its name from President Andrew Jackson.
