= Jackson Township, Little River County, Arkansas =

Jackson Township
- Township
- Location in Arkansas Jackson Township (the United States)
- Coordinates: 33°43′04″N 94°25′05″W
- Country: United States
- State: Arkansas
- County: Little River

Area
  - Total: 38.26 sq mi (99.1 km^{2})
  - Land: 38.114 sq mi (98.71 km^{2})
  - Water: 0.146 sq mi (0.38 km^{2})
- Elevation: 449 ft (137 m)

Population (2010)
  - Total: 1,692
  - Density: 44.39/sq mi (17.14/km^{2})
- Time zone: UTC-6 (CST)
  - Summer (DST): UTC-5 (CDT)
- FIPS code: 05-91863
- GNIS ID: 66836

Jackson Township is a township in Little River County, Arkansas, United States.

According to the 2010 Census, Jackson Township is located at 33°43′04″N 94°25′05″W (33.717820, -94.418128). It has a total area of 38.26 square miles (99.1 square kilometers); of which 38.114 sq mi (98.71 km^{2}) is land and 0.146 sq mi (0.38 km^{2}) is water (0.38%). As per the USGS National Elevation Dataset, the elevation is 449 feet (137 m).

The city of Foreman is located within the township.

== Demographics ==
Its total population was 1,692 as of the 2010 United States census, a decrease of 8.54 percent from 1,850 at the 2000 census.
