= Jackson Township, Gentry County, Missouri =

Township in Gentry County, Missouri, U.S.

Jackson Township
- Township
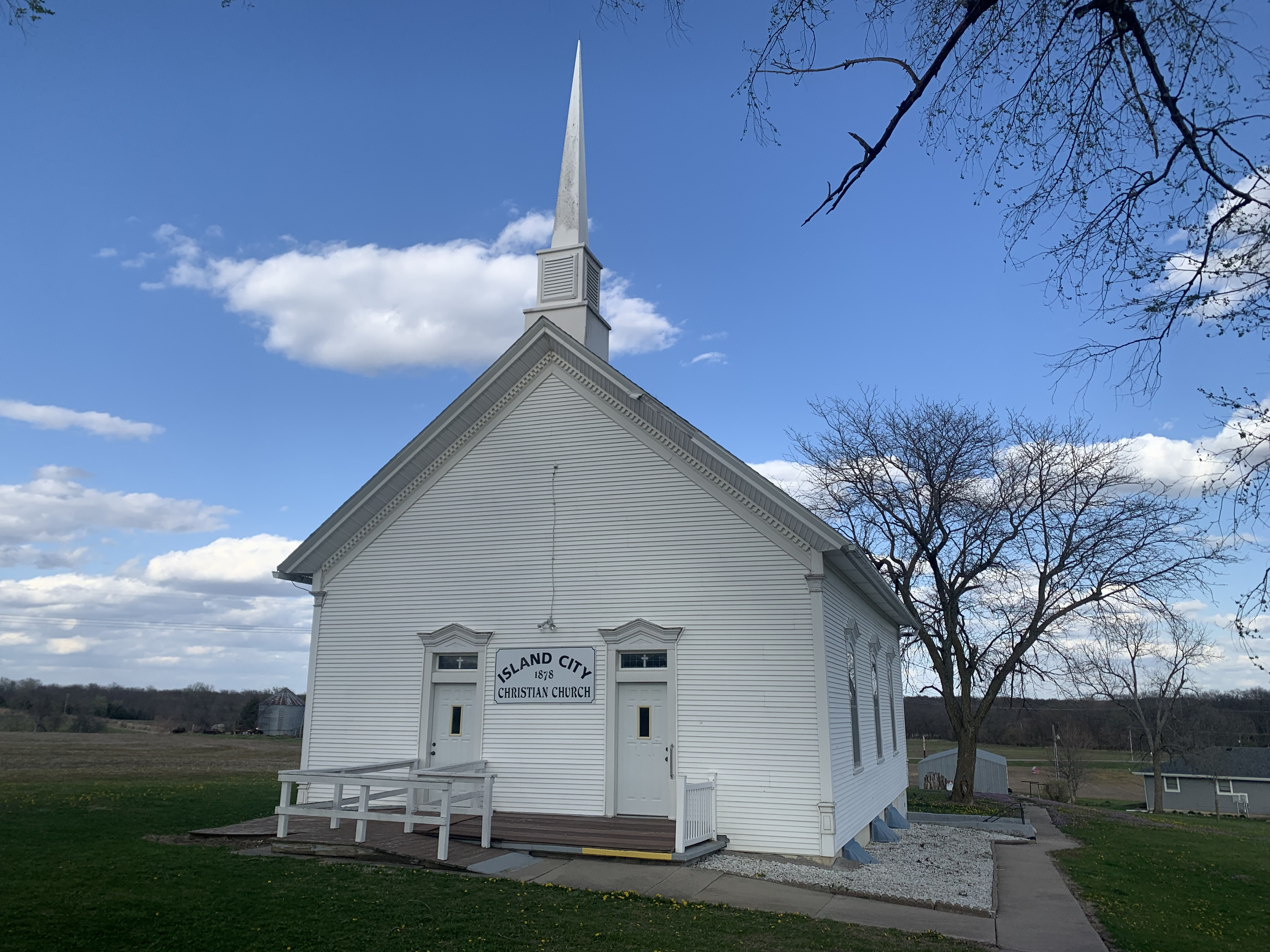
- Island City Christian Church in northwestern Jackson Township

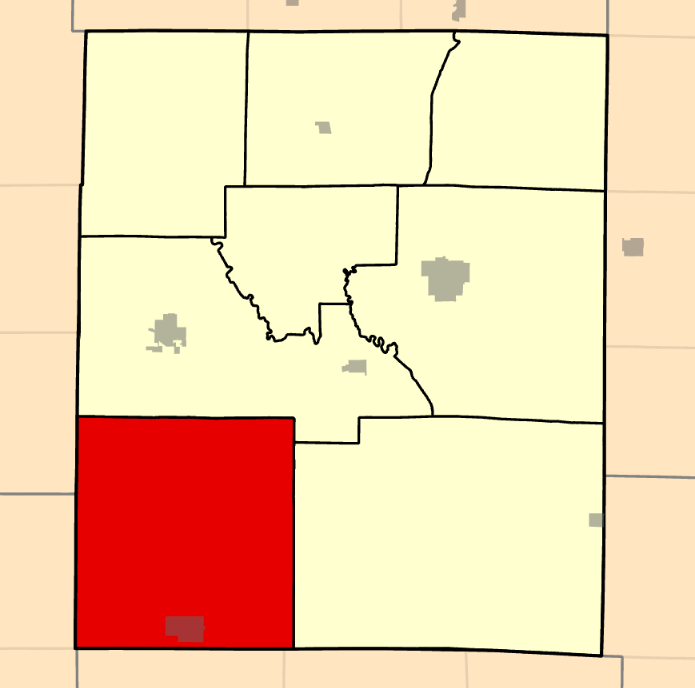
- Coordinates: 40°06′04″N 94°31′42″W
- Country: United States
- State: Missouri
- County: Gentry

Area
  - Total: 76.41 sq mi (197.9 km^{2})
  - Land: 76.24 sq mi (197.5 km^{2})
  - Water: 0.17 sq mi (0.44 km^{2}) 0.22%
- Elevation: 1,037 ft (316 m)

Population (2020)
  - Total: 1,160
  - Density: 15.2/sq mi (5.9/km^{2})
- FIPS code: 29-07535774
- GNIS feature ID: 766669

Jackson Township is a township in Gentry County, Missouri, United States. At the 2020 census, its population was 1160.

Jackson Township has the name of an early settler.

== Transportation ==
The following highways travel through the township:

- U.S. Route 169
- Route 48
- Route AA
- Route BB
- Route CC
- Route M
- Route UU
- Route V
- Route Z
