= Jackson Township, Reynolds County, Missouri =

Township in Reynolds County, Missouri, U.S.

Coordinates: 37.3306°N 91.0975°W

Jackson Township is an inactive township in Reynolds County, in the U.S. state of Missouri.

Jackson Township was erected in 1845, taking its name from the local Jackson family.
