= Jackson Township, Sullivan County, Missouri =

Township in Sullivan County, Missouri, U.S.

Coordinates: 40.3192°N 93.1122°W

Jackson Township is a township in Sullivan County, in the U.S. state of Missouri.

Jackson Township was erected in 1872, most likely taking its name from Andrew Jackson.
