= Jackson Township, Nodaway County, Missouri =

Township in Nodaway County, Missouri, U.S.

Jackson Township
- Township
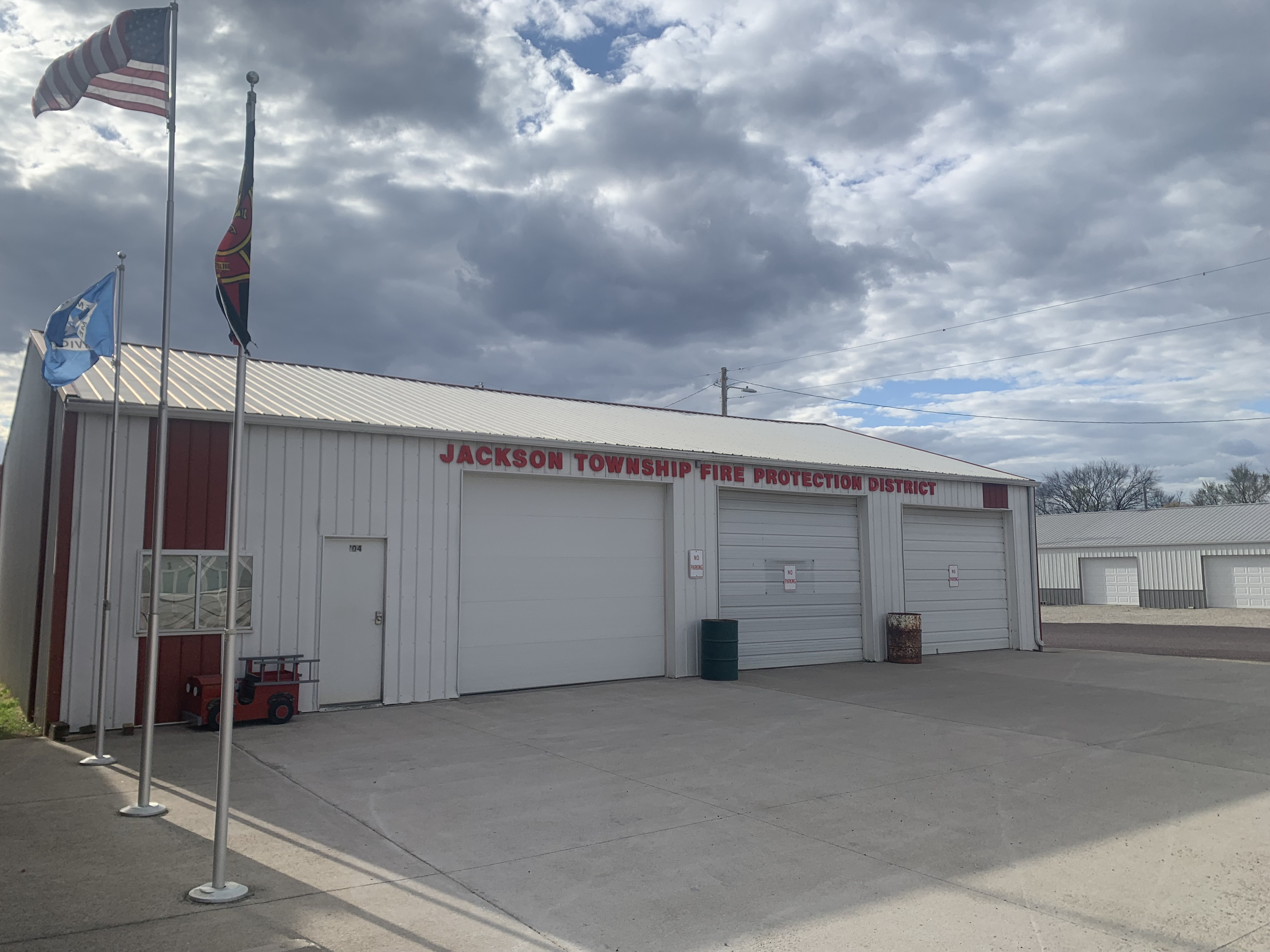
- Jackson Township Fire Station in Ravenwood

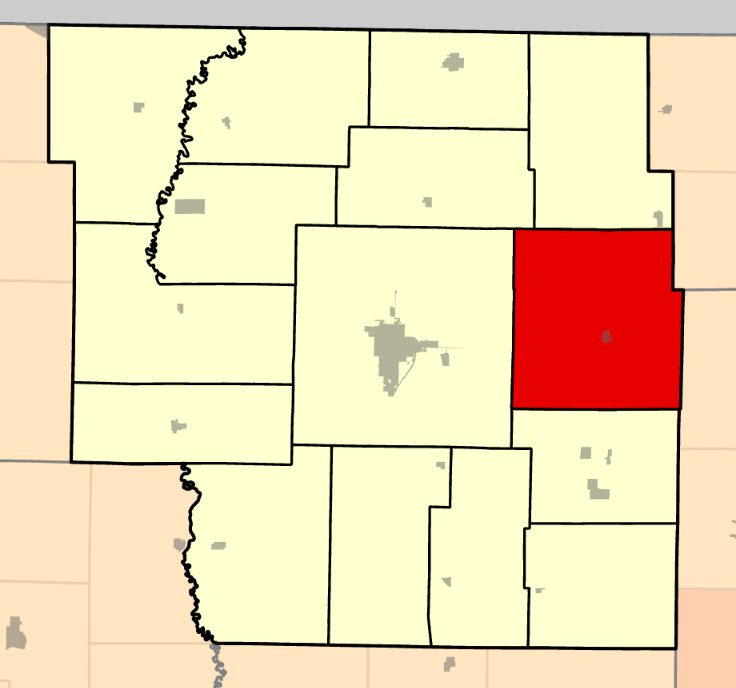
- Coordinates: 40°22′29″N 94°40′40″W
- Country: United States
- State: Missouri
- County: Nodaway
- Erected: 1866

Area
  - Total: 74.73 sq mi (193.5 km^{2})
  - Land: 74.72 sq mi (193.5 km^{2})
  - Water: 0.01 sq mi (0.026 km^{2}) 0.01%
- Elevation: 1,001 ft (305 m)

Population (2020)
  - Total: 987
  - Density: 13.2/sq mi (5.1/km^{2})
- FIPS code: 29-14735954
- GNIS feature ID: 767090

Jackson Township is a township in Nodaway County, Missouri, United States. At the 2020 census, its population was 987. It contains about 70 sections. The town of Ravenwood is in its center.

== History ==
Jackson Township was erected in 1866, and named after President Andrew Jackson.

== Settlements ==
Two hamlets, Orrsburg and Sweet Home, once existed in the northwest and east, respectively.

== Transportation ==
The following highways travel through the township:

- U.S. Route 136
- Route 46
- Route AF
- Route E
- Route MM
- Route O
- Route W
