= Jackson Township, Polk County, Missouri =

Inactive township in the US state of Missouri

Coordinates: 37.4681°N 93.5494°W

Jackson Township is an inactive township in Polk County, in the U.S. state of Missouri.

Jackson Township has the name of President Andrew Jackson.
