= Jackson Township, Sharp County, Arkansas =

Jackson Township
- Township
- Location in Arkansas Jackson Township (the United States)
- Coordinates: 36°13′32″N 91°24′48″W
- Country: United States
- State: Arkansas
- County: Sharp

Area
  - Total: 26.923 sq mi (69.73 km^{2})
  - Land: 26.724 sq mi (69.21 km^{2})
  - Water: 0.199 sq mi (0.52 km^{2})
- Elevation: 364 ft (111 m)

Population (2010)
  - Total: 295
  - Density: 11.0/sq mi (4.26/km^{2})
- Time zone: UTC-6 (CST)
  - Summer (DST): UTC-5 (CDT)
- FIPS code: 05-91881
- GNIS ID: 69141

Jackson Township is a township in Sharp County, Arkansas, United States. Its total population was 295 as of the 2010 United States census, a decrease of 9.51 percent from 326 at the 2000 census.

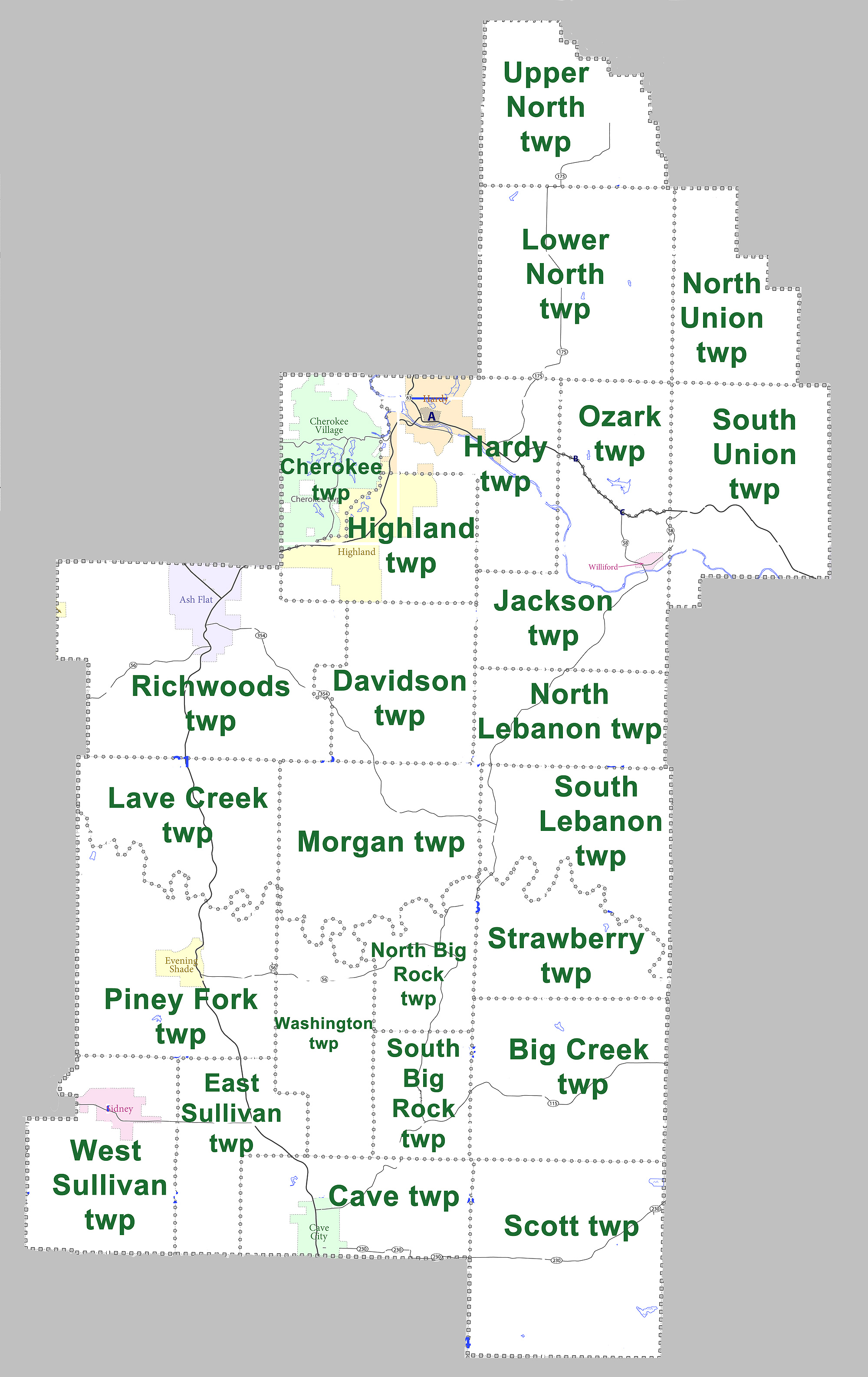
Townships in Sharp County as of 2010

According to the 2010 Census, Jackson Township is located at 36°13′32″N 91°24′48″W (36.225564, -91.413279). It has a total area of 26.923 square miles (69.73 square kilometers); of which 26.724 sq mi (69.21 km^{2}) is land and 0.199 sq mi (0.52 km^{2}) is water (0.74%). As per the USGS National Elevation Dataset, the elevation is 364 feet (111 m).

The town of Williford is located within the township.
