= Jackson Township, Nevada County, Arkansas =

Jackson Township
- Township
- Location in Arkansas Jackson Township (the United States)
- Coordinates: 33°35′50″N 93°09′30″W
- Country: United States
- State: Arkansas
- County: Nevada

Area
  - Total: 40.726 sq mi (105.48 km^{2})
  - Land: 40.700 sq mi (105.41 km^{2})
  - Water: 0.026 sq mi (0.067 km^{2})
- Elevation: 331 ft (101 m)

Population (2010)
  - Total: 105
  - Density: 2.58/sq mi (0.996/km^{2})
- Time zone: UTC-6 (CST)
  - Summer (DST): UTC-5 (CDT)
- FIPS code: 05-91869
- GNIS ID: 68903

Jackson Township is a township in Nevada County, Arkansas, United States. Its total population was 105 as of the 2010 United States census, a decrease of 41.34 percent from 179 at the 2000 census.

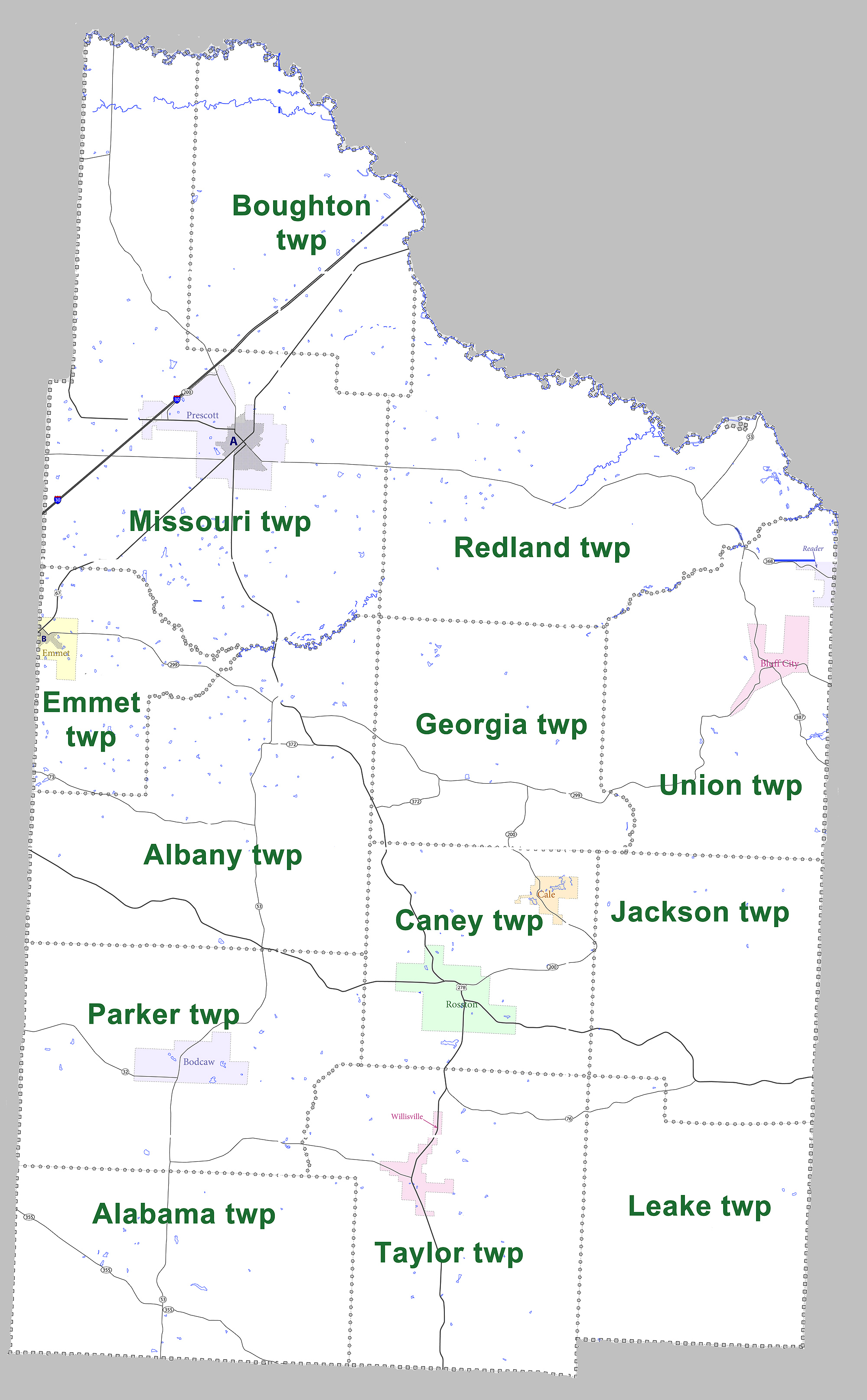
Townships in Nevada County as of 2010

According to the 2010 Census, Jackson Township is located at 33°35′50″N 93°09′30″W (33.597099, -93.158403). It has a total area of 40.726 square miles (105.48 square kilometers); of which 40.700 sq mi (105.41 km^{2}) is land and 0.026 sq mi (0.067 km^{2}) is water (0.06%). As per the USGS National Elevation Dataset, the elevation is 331 feet (101 m).
