= Jackson Township, White County, Arkansas =

Jackson Township
- Township
- Location in Arkansas Jackson Township (the United States)
- Coordinates: 35°29′25″N 91°45′00″W
- Country: United States
- State: Arkansas
- County: White

Area
  - Total: 29.620 sq mi (76.72 km^{2})
  - Land: 29.620 sq mi (76.72 km^{2})
  - Water: 0.000 sq mi (0 km^{2})
- Elevation: 630 ft (192 m)

Population (2010)
  - Total: 419
  - Density: 14.1/sq mi (5.46/km^{2})
- Time zone: UTC-6 (CST)
  - Summer (DST): UTC-5 (CDT)
- FIPS code: 05-91887
- GNIS ID: 69839

Jackson Township is a township in White County, Arkansas, United States. Its total population was 419 as of the 2010 United States census, an increase of 7.99 percent from 388 at the 2000 census.

According to the 2010 Census, Jackson Township is located at 35°29′25″N 91°45′00″W (35.490330, -91.749921). It has a total area of 29.620 square miles (76.72 square kilometers); all of which is land. As per the USGS National Elevation Dataset, the elevation is 630 feet (192 m).
