= Jackson Township, Daviess County, Missouri =

Township in Daviess County, Missouri, U.S.

Jackson Township
- Township
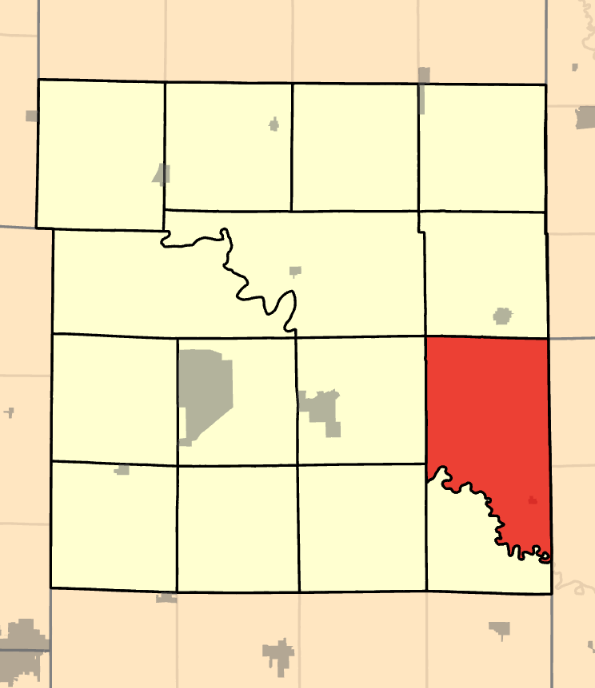
- Coordinates: 39°54′10″N 93°48′22″W
- Country: United States
- State: Missouri
- County: Daviess

Area
  - Total: 49.17 sq mi (127.3 km^{2})
  - Land: 48.58 sq mi (125.8 km^{2})
  - Water: 0.59 sq mi (1.5 km^{2}) 1.2%
- Elevation: 810 ft (250 m)

Population (2020)
  - Total: 697
  - Density: 14.3/sq mi (5.5/km^{2})
- FIPS code: 29-06135738
- GNIS feature ID: 766580

Jackson Township is a township in Daviess County, Missouri, United States. At the 2020 census, its population was 697.

Jackson Township has the name of President Andrew Jackson.
