= Jackson Township, Livingston County, Missouri =

Township in Livingston County, Missouri, U.S.

Coordinates: 39.8920132°N 93.6645893°W

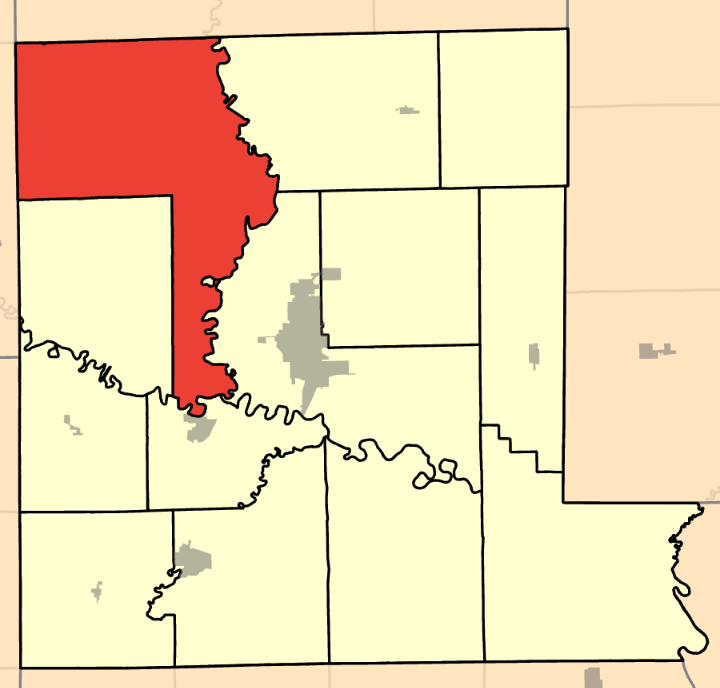

Jackson Township is a township in Livingston County, in the U.S. state of Missouri.

Jackson Township has the name of Andrew Jackson.
