= Jackson Township, Pope County, Arkansas =

Jackson Township
- Township
- Location in Arkansas
- Coordinates: 35°29′20″N 92°57′01″W
- Country: United States
- State: Arkansas
- County: Pope

Area
  - Total: 103.76 sq mi (268.7 km^{2})
  - Land: 103.72 sq mi (268.6 km^{2})
  - Water: 0.04 sq mi (0.10 km^{2})
- Elevation: 650 ft (200 m)

Population (2010)
  - Total: 1,110
  - Density: 10.7/sq mi (4.1/km^{2})
- Time zone: UTC-6 (CST)
  - Summer (DST): UTC-5 (CDT)
- GNIS feature ID: 69708

Jackson Township is one of nineteen current townships in Pope County, Arkansas, USA. As of the 2010 census, its unincorporated population was 1,110.

== Geography ==
According to the United States Census Bureau, Jackson Township covers an area of 103.76 square miles (268.7 km^{2}), with 103.72 square miles (268.6 km^{2}) of it land and 0.04 square miles (0.10 km^{2}) of water.

=== Cities, towns, and villages ===
- Hector
