= Jackson Township, Boone County, Arkansas =

Jackson Township
- Township
- Location in Arkansas
- Coordinates: 36°18′19.45″N 93°11′24.34″W
- Country: United States
- State: Arkansas
- County: Boone

Area
  - Total: 21.745 sq mi (56.32 km^{2})
  - Land: 21.739 sq mi (56.30 km^{2})
  - Water: 0.006 sq mi (0.016 km^{2})

Population (2010)
  - Total: 1,340
  - Density: 61.64/sq mi (23.80/km^{2})
- Time zone: UTC-6 (CST)
  - Summer (DST): UTC-5 (CDT)
- Zip Code: 72601 (Harrison)
- Area code: 870

Jackson Township is one of twenty current townships in Boone County, Arkansas, USA. As of the 2010 census, its total population was 1,340.

== Geography ==
According to the United States Census Bureau, Jackson Township covers an area of 21.745 square miles (56.32 km^{2}); 21.739 square miles (56.30 km^{2}) of land and 0.006 square miles (0.016 km^{2}) of water.

=== Cities, towns, and villages ===
- Harrison (small part)

== Population history ==
The township was part of Carroll County during the 1860 census. Part of the city of Harrison overlays Jackson Township according to the 1980 US Census going forward.

Historical population
Census	Pop.	Note	%±
1860	571		—
1870	320		−44.0%
1880	710		121.9%
1890	717		1.0%
1900	582		−18.8%
1910	401		−31.1%
1920	373		−7.0%
1930	363		−2.7%
1940	520		43.3%
1950	485		−6.7%
1960	444		−8.5%
1970	526		18.5%
1980	703		33.7%
1990	839		19.3%
2000	1,156		37.8%
2010	1,340		15.9%
