= National Elevation Dataset =

United States database of topographic data

The National Elevation Dataset (NED) consists of high precision topography or ground surface elevation data (digital elevation model) for the United States. It was maintained by the USGS and all the data is in the public domain. Since the 3D Elevation Program came online, the NED was subsumed into The National Map as one of its layers of information.

== Sources ==
The NED dataset is a compilation of data from a variety of existing high-precision datasets such as LiDAR data (see also National LIDAR Dataset - USA), contour maps, USGS DEM collection, SRTM and other sources which were reorganized and combined into a seamless dataset, designed to cover all the United States territory in its continuity.

== Formats ==
Data is available in formats including ESRI ArcGRID, GeoTIFF, and BIL.
