= 1931 Tennessee State Tigers football team =

American college football season

1931 Tennessee State Tigers football
- Conference: Independent
- Record: 2–3
- Head coach: T. D. Upshaw (2nd season)

1931 Southern college football independents records
	Conf.			Overall
Team	W	L	T	W		L		T
Catholic University		–		8	–	1	–	0
Texas Mines		–		7	–	1	–	0
Delaware		–		5	–	1	–	2
William & Mary Norfolk		–		1	–	0	–	1
Furman		–		5	–	2	–	2
George Washington		–		5	–	2	–	2
Texas Tech		–		6	–	3	–	0
Troy State		–		6	–	3	–	0
Middle Tennessee State Teachers		–		6	–	4	–	0
Navy		–		5	–	5	–	1
Wake Forest		–		4	–	4	–	0
Western Carolina		–		4	–	4	–	0
Davidson		–		4	–	4	–	2
Western Maryland		–		4	–	4	–	2
Delaware State		–		2	–	2	–	1
Georgetown		–		4	–	5	–	1
Richmond		–		4	–	5	–	0
Tennessee State		–		2	–	3	–	0
West Virginia		–		4	–	6	–	0
Oglethorpe		–		3	–	6	–	0
South Georgia Teachers		–		2	–	6	–	0
Jefferson (TX)		–		1	–	7	–	1
Jacksonville State		–		0	–	7	–	1

The 1931 Tennessee State Tigers football team represented Tennessee Agricultural & Industrial State College—now known as Tennessee State University—as an independent during the 1931 college football season. Led by T. D. Upshaw in his second and final season as head coach, the Tigers compiled a record of 2–3.

== Schedule ==
Date	Opponent	Site	Result	Source
October 17	at Morristown	Morristown, TN	W 12–0	
October 30	at West Kentucky Industrial	Hook Park; Paducah, KY	L 6–14	
November 14	at LeMoyne	Memphis, TN	W 13–12	
November 21	Kentucky State	Nashville, TN	L 0–18	
November 26	Louisville Municipal^{†}	Nashville, TN	W 39–0 or 41–0	
^{†}Homecoming
