= 1931 Eureka Red Devils football team =

American college football season

1931 Eureka Red Devils football
- Conference: Illinois Intercollegiate Athletic Conference
- Record: 3–4–1 (2–4–1 IIAC)
- Head coach: Ralph McKinzie (11th season)
- Captain: Bud Cole
- Home stadium: McKenzie Field

1931 Illinois Intercollegiate Athletic Conference football standings
	Conf.					Overall
Team	W		L		T	W		L		T
Monmouth (IL) $	5	–	0	–	1	9	–	0	–	1
Millikin	4	–	1	–	0	6	–	3	–	0
Bradley	4	–	1	–	0	5	–	3	–	0
Augustana (IL)	3	–	1	–	2	5	–	2	–	2
St. Viator	5	–	2	–	0	5	–	2	–	0
Southern Illinois	4	–	2	–	0	7	–	2	–	0
North Central	4	–	2	–	0	5	–	2	–	0
Northern Illinois State	4	–	2	–	0	5	–	3	–	0
Carthage	3	–	3	–	1	4	–	4	–	1
Elmhurst	3	–	3	–	0	4	–	4	–	0
Knox (IL)	2	–	2	–	1	3	–	5	–	1
Illinois Wesleyan	3	–	3	–	0	3	–	5	–	0
McKendree	2	–	3	–	1	4	–	4	–	1
Eastern Illinois	2	–	3	–	0	3	–	4	–	0
Mount Morris	1	–	2	–	1	4	–	4	–	1
Eureka	2	–	4	–	1	3	–	4	–	1
Shurtleff	2	–	4	–	1	3	–	4	–	1
Western Illinois	2	–	4	–	0	2	–	6	–	0
Illinois College	1	–	4	–	2	2	–	5	–	2
Illinois State Normal	1	–	6	–	1	1	–	6	–	1
Lake Forest	0	–	2	–	2	0	–	2	–	4
Wheaton (IL)	0	–	3	–	0	3	–	5	–	0
$ – Conference champion

The 1931 Eureka Red Devils football team was an American football team that represented Eureka College in the Illinois Intercollegiate Athletic Conference (IIAC) during the 1931 college football season. In its 11th season under head coach Ralph McKinzie, the team compiled a 3–4–1 record, 2–4–1 against conference opponents.

Quarterback Enos Miller "Bud" Cole was the team captain.

== Schedule ==
Date	Opponent	Site	Result	Source
October 3	Culver–Stockton*	McKinzie Field; Eureka, IL	W 42–14	
October 10	Western Illinois	McKinzie Field; Eureka, IL	W 13–6	
October 17	at Elmhurst	McCormick Field; Elmhurst, IL	L 0–4	
October 23	at Illinois State	Normal, IL	W 12–0	
October 31	Illinois Wesleyan^{†}	McKinzie Field; Eureka, IL	L 0–19	
November 7	at Carthage	Carthage, IL	L 7–12	
November 14	Mount Morris	McKinzie Field; Eureka, IL	T 0–0	
November 21	at Illinois College	Jacksonville, IL	L 0–12	
*Non-conference game; ^{†}Homecoming

== Roster ==
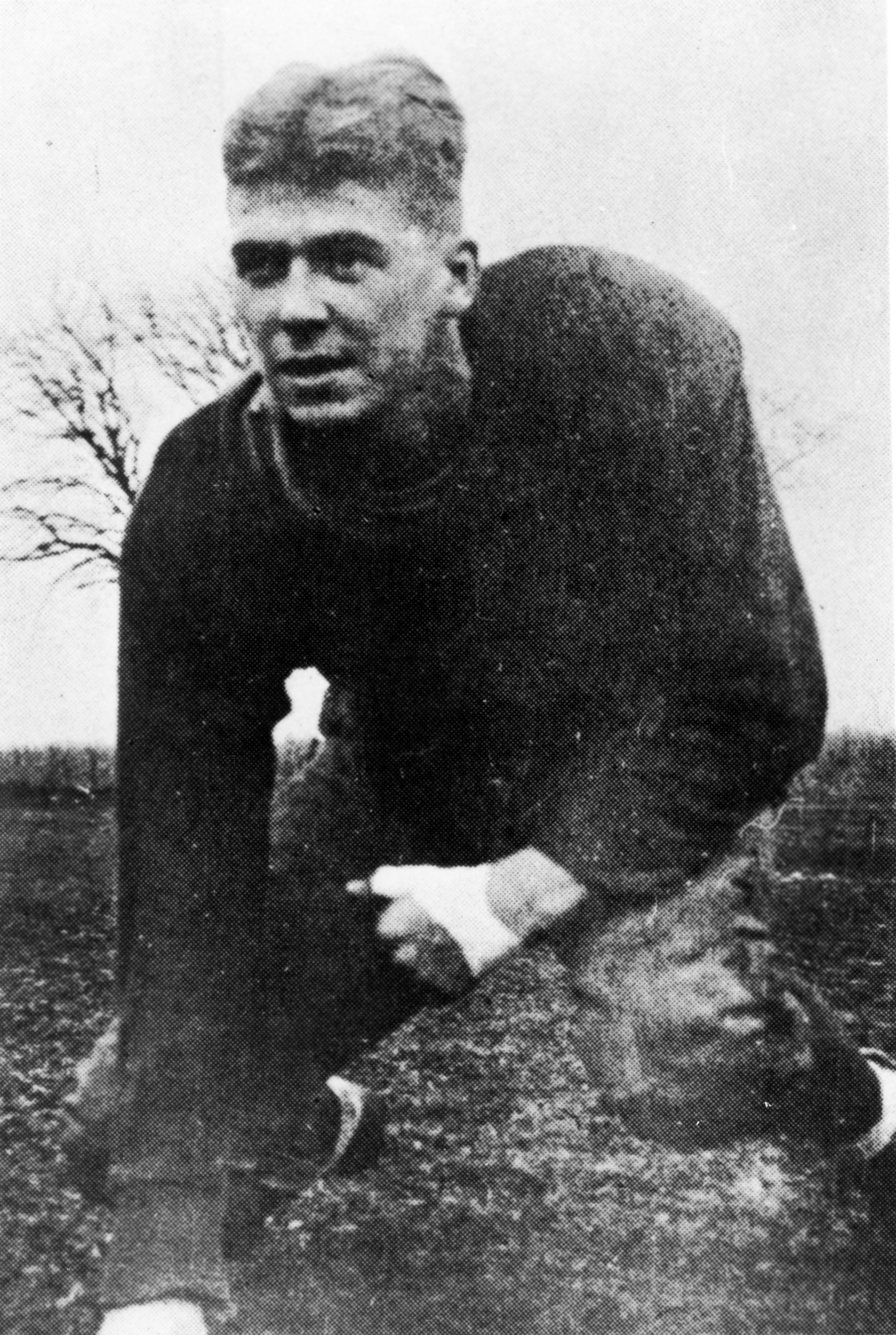
Ronald Reagan at Eureka

- Livengood - quarterback
- Wilson - halfback
- Enos Miller "Bud" Cole - quarterback, halfback, and captain
- Johann - fullback
- Baker - back
- Fletcher Shobe - halfback
- Olson/Olsen - halfback, quarterback, fullback
- Livey - halfback
- Baker - halfback
- Franklin Burghardt - center
- Ronald Reagan - guard
- Wilfred A. "Tubby" Muller - guard
- Slater - guard
- James L. Conlee - tackle
- Ray Holmes - tackle
- Jim Rattan - tackle
- Henry Sand - end
- Dixon - end
- Elmer E. "Knute" Fischer - end
- Smith - end

== Ronald Reagan ==
Ronald Reagan, who later served as the 40th President of the United States, was a member of the team. Coach McKinzie recalled Reagan as "just a fellow who wanted to play football but didn't have too much talent." Reagan became a starter at the guard position as a junior in 1930 and remained a starter as a senior in 1931. McKinzie added: "He had determination, oh yes. He was a team player, very definitely."

In his biography of Reagan, Edmund Morris wrote that "he remained a slow, half-blind, yet fanatically dedicated player through the end of his last season. He prayed before every game, then walked onto the grid scared enough to piss himself His bladder eased as soon as play began, and for the next hour he would hurl himself at bigger bodies without flinching."

Reagan also served as captain and coach of the school's swim team during his senior year.

=== Reagan-Burghardt relationship ===
Franklin Burghardt was an African-American who was the team's starting center. While playing a road game against Elmhurst College, a hotel refused to allow Burghardt and the team's other black player, Jim Rattan, to stay. The coach was angry and decided that the whole team would sleep on the bus. Reagan, Burghardt later recalled, worried that this would cause the team's performance to suffer and thus humiliate the black players and harm their morale, and suggested instead that the coach tell the team that the hotel did not have enough rooms. Coach McKinzie gave him fare for a taxi for Reagan, Bughardt, and Rattan to Dixon, Illinois, to stay with his parents, Jack and Nelle Reagan, who welcomed them "like Amos 'n' Andy."

In Reagan's 1986 autobiography, Where's the Rest of Me?, he told a story about a racist player on an opposing team who was "filled with hatred and prejudice" and "played dirty" while targeting Burghardt. Though Burghardt was injured, he refused to play dirty and astounded the other team with his strength and skill. At the end of the game, the defeated player turned around to shake Burghardt's hand, telling him he was the greatest human being he had ever met. On Martin Luther King Jr. Day in 1986, President Reagan shared the same story at a school in Washington, D.C. Reagan and Burghardt remained friends, many decades later.
