= 1931 Wake Forest Demon Deacons football team =

American college football season

1931 Wake Forest Demon Deacons football
- Conference: Independent
- Record: 4–4
- Head coach: Pat Miller (3rd season)
- Captain: Leon Brogden
- Home stadium: Gore Field

1931 Southern college football independents records
	Conf.			Overall
Team	W	L	T	W		L		T
Catholic University		–		8	–	1	–	0
Texas Mines		–		7	–	1	–	0
Delaware		–		5	–	1	–	2
William & Mary Norfolk		–		1	–	0	–	1
Furman		–		5	–	2	–	2
George Washington		–		5	–	2	–	2
Texas Tech		–		6	–	3	–	0
Troy State		–		6	–	3	–	0
Middle Tennessee State Teachers		–		6	–	4	–	0
Navy		–		5	–	5	–	1
Wake Forest		–		4	–	4	–	0
Western Carolina		–		4	–	4	–	0
Davidson		–		4	–	4	–	2
Western Maryland		–		4	–	4	–	2
Delaware State		–		2	–	2	–	1
Georgetown		–		4	–	5	–	1
Richmond		–		4	–	5	–	0
West Virginia		–		4	–	6	–	0
Oglethorpe		–		3	–	6	–	0
South Georgia Teachers		–		2	–	6	–	0
Jefferson (TX)		–		1	–	7	–	1
Jacksonville State		–		0	–	7	–	1

The 1931 Wake Forest Demon Deacons football team was an American football team that represented Wake Forest University during the 1931 college football season. In its third season under head coach Pat Miller, the team compiled a 4–4 record.

== Schedule ==
Date	Time	Opponent	Site	Result	Attendance	Source
September 26		at North Carolina	Kenan Memorial Stadium; Chapel Hill, NC (rivalry)	L 0–37	11,000	
October 3		vs. Furman	Gastonia High School Field; Gastonia, NC	L 6–36		
October 16		at NC State	Riddick Stadium; Raleigh, NC (rivalry)	W 6–0		
October 24		at Duke	Duke Stadium; Durham, NC (rivalry)	L 0–28		
October 31		Erskine	Gore Field; Wake Forest, NC	W 13–0		
November 7		vs. Presbyterian	World War Memorial Stadium; Greensboro, NC	W 12–0		
November 13		at Oglethorpe	Hermance Stadium; Atlanta, GA	L 0–37		
November 26	2:30 p.m.	Davidson	Central High Field; Charlotte, NC	W 7–0	8,000	
