= 1931 Delaware State Hornets football team =

American college football season

1931 Delaware State Hornets football
- Conference: Independent
- Record: 2–2–1
- Head coach: John L. McKinley (1st season)

1931 Southern college football independents records
	Conf.			Overall
Team	W	L	T	W		L		T
Catholic University		–		8	–	1	–	0
Texas Mines		–		7	–	1	–	0
Delaware		–		5	–	1	–	2
William & Mary Norfolk		–		1	–	0	–	1
Furman		–		5	–	2	–	2
George Washington		–		5	–	2	–	2
Texas Tech		–		6	–	3	–	0
Troy State		–		6	–	3	–	0
Middle Tennessee State Teachers		–		6	–	4	–	0
Navy		–		5	–	5	–	1
Wake Forest		–		4	–	4	–	0
Western Carolina		–		4	–	4	–	0
Davidson		–		4	–	4	–	2
Western Maryland		–		4	–	4	–	2
Delaware State		–		2	–	2	–	1
Georgetown		–		4	–	5	–	1
Richmond		–		4	–	5	–	0
Tennessee State		–		2	–	3	–	0
West Virginia		–		4	–	6	–	0
Oglethorpe		–		3	–	6	–	0
South Georgia Teachers		–		2	–	6	–	0
Jefferson (TX)		–		1	–	7	–	1
Jacksonville State		–		0	–	7	–	1

The 1931 Delaware State Hornets football team represented Delaware State University as an independent during the 1931 college football season. The team was coached by John L. McKinley, who came to Delaware State from New York City. Delaware State compiled a record of 2–2–1 on the season.

== Schedule ==
Date	Opponent	Site	Result	Source
October 17	at Bordentown	Bordentown, NJ	W 14–13	
	Howard High School		T 0–0	
	Cheyney		L 0–30	
October 31	Downingtown		L 0–33	
	Princess Anne		W 30–0	
