= 1931 Delaware Fightin' Blue Hens football team =

American college football season

1931 Delaware Fightin' Blue Hens football
- Conference: Independent
- Record: 5–1–2
- Head coach: Charles Rogers (1st season)
- Home stadium: Frazer Field

1931 Southern college football independents records
	Conf.			Overall
Team	W	L	T	W		L		T
Catholic University		–		8	–	1	–	0
Texas Mines		–		7	–	1	–	0
Delaware		–		5	–	1	–	2
William & Mary Norfolk		–		1	–	0	–	1
Furman		–		5	–	2	–	2
George Washington		–		5	–	2	–	2
Texas Tech		–		6	–	3	–	0
Troy State		–		6	–	3	–	0
Middle Tennessee State Teachers		–		6	–	4	–	0
Navy		–		5	–	5	–	1
Wake Forest		–		4	–	4	–	0
Western Carolina		–		4	–	4	–	0
Davidson		–		4	–	4	–	2
Western Maryland		–		4	–	4	–	2
Delaware State		–		2	–	2	–	1
Georgetown		–		4	–	5	–	1
Richmond		–		4	–	5	–	0
Tennessee State		–		2	–	3	–	0
West Virginia		–		4	–	6	–	0
Oglethorpe		–		3	–	6	–	0
South Georgia Teachers		–		2	–	6	–	0
Jefferson (TX)		–		1	–	7	–	1
Jacksonville State		–		0	–	7	–	1

The 1931 Delaware Fightin' Blue Hens football team was an American football team that represented the University of Delaware in the 1931 college football season. In their first season under head coach Charles Rogers, the Blue Hens compiled a 5–1–2 record and outscored opponents by a total of 118 to 25. The team played its home games at Frazer Field in Newark, Delaware.

== Schedule ==
Date	Opponent	Site	Result	Attendance	Source
October 3	Susquehanna	Frazer Field; Newark, DE	W 27–0		
October 10	Saint Joseph's	Frazer Field; Newark, DE	T 0–0		
October 17	at Navy	Thompson Stadium; Annapolis, MD	L 7–12	9,000	
October 24	Richmond	Frazer Field; Newark, DE	W 7–0	5,000	
October 31	at Rutgers	Neilson Field; New Brunswick, NJ	T 6–6		
November 7	Swarthmore	Frazer Field; Newark, DE	W 26–0	8,000	
November 14	Pennsylvania Military	Frazer Field; Newark, DE	W 13–7	10,000	
November 21	at Haverford	Walton Field; Haverford, PA	W 31–0		
