= C. B. Johnston =

American athlete, coach, and college athletics administrator

- Johnston pictured in The Rhododendron 1933, Appalachian State yearbook

Biographical details
- Born: c. 1895; Wisconsin, U.S.
- Died: after 1933

Coaching career (HC unless noted)

Football
- c. 1924: Greensboro HS (NC)
- 1925–1928: Clarkson
- 1929–1932: Appalachian State

Baseball
- 1931: Appalachian State

Administrative career (AD unless noted)
- 1929–1933: Appalachian State

Head coaching record
- Overall: 26–9–7 (college football, Appalachian State only)

Accomplishments and honors

Championships
- Football; 1 North State Conference (1931)

Clement Bernard "Johnnie" Johnston Sr. (born c. 1895, missing 1933) was an American football and baseball player, coach, and college athletics administrator. He was the second head football coach at Appalachian State Teachers College—now known as Appalachian State University—located in Boone, North Carolina, serving from 1929 to 1932. He played varsity football, basketball and baseball at Wake Forest University, earning letters in all three sports. In addition to coaching at Appalachian State, he also held a coaching position at Clarkson University, for which he was trained at a coaching school at Bucknell University under Fielding H. Yost. He is the grandfather of Cathy Johnston-Forbes.

== Disappearance ==
In 1933, Johnston sent a postcard to his wife from Zanesville, Ohio, stating that he was on his way to Chicago, Illinois to publish a book after being fired as head football coach of Appalachian State Teachers College the previous year. No one heard from him after that. Johnston may have changed his name to play four more years of college athletics. According to Johnston's grandson, he may have been spotted at a golf tournament in Florida around the years 1947 to 1951 by Johnston's son, either in Orlando, Gainesville, or Pensacola. Besides a former girlfriend of Johnston's, who potentially knew his whereabouts, nobody knows where Johnston went after he first disappeared, and nobody knows where he died.

== Head coaching record ==
=== College football ===
Year	Team	Overall	Conference	Standing	Bowl/playoffs
Appalachian State Mountaineers (Independent) (1929–1930)
1929	Appalachian State	4–1–3			
1930	Appalachian State	8–2–1			
Appalachian State Mountaineers (North State Conference) (1931–1932)
1931	Appalachian State	9–2–2	3–0	1st	
1932	Appalachian State	5–4–1	2–1	2nd	
Appalachian State:		26–9–7	5–1		
Total:					
National championship Conference title Conference division title or championship game berth

== See also ==
- List of people who disappeared
