= 1931 Western Carolina Yodelers football team =

American college football season

1931 Western Carolina Yodelers football
- Conference: Independent
- Record: 4–4
- Head coach: C. C. Poindexter (1st season)

1931 Southern college football independents records
	Conf.			Overall
Team	W	L	T	W		L		T
Catholic University		–		8	–	1	–	0
Texas Mines		–		7	–	1	–	0
Delaware		–		5	–	1	–	2
William & Mary Norfolk		–		1	–	0	–	1
Furman		–		5	–	2	–	2
George Washington		–		5	–	2	–	2
Texas Tech		–		6	–	3	–	0
Troy State		–		6	–	3	–	0
Middle Tennessee State Teachers		–		6	–	4	–	0
Navy		–		5	–	5	–	1
Wake Forest		–		4	–	4	–	0
Western Carolina		–		4	–	4	–	0
Davidson		–		4	–	4	–	2
Western Maryland		–		4	–	4	–	2
Delaware State		–		2	–	2	–	1
Georgetown		–		4	–	5	–	1
Richmond		–		4	–	5	–	0
Tennessee State		–		2	–	3	–	0
West Virginia		–		4	–	6	–	0
Oglethorpe		–		3	–	6	–	0
South Georgia Teachers		–		2	–	6	–	0
Jefferson (TX)		–		1	–	7	–	1
Jacksonville State		–		0	–	7	–	1

The 1931 Western Carolina Yodelers football team represented Western Carolina Teachers College—now known as Western Carolina University—as an independent the 1931 college football season. Led by first-year head coach C. C. Poindexter, Western Carolina compiled a record of 4–4.

== Schedule ==
Date	Opponent	Site	Result	Source
October 3	at Sylva Collegiate Institute	Alison Field; Sylva, NC	W 12–7	
October 8	Cherokee Indians	Cullowhee, NC	W 7–6	
October 16	Biltmore Junior College	Cullowhee, NC	W 12–6	
October 24	Cherokee Indians	Cullowhee, NC	W 20–0	
October 31	Young Harris	Cullowhee, NC	L 0–19	
November 7	at Hiwassee	Madisonville, TN	L 6–32	
November 14	at Mars Hill	Mars Hill, NC	L 0–33	
November 20	Weaver	Cullowhee, NC	L 2–19	
