= John L. McKinley =

American football coach

Coaching career (HC unless noted)
- 1931: Delaware State

Head coaching record
- Overall: 2–2–1

John L. McKinley was an American college football coach. He served as the head football coach at the State College for Colored Students—now known as Delaware State University—in Dover, Delaware for one season, in 1931.

McKinley graduated from Armstrong High School—now known as Friendship Armstrong Academy—in Washington, D.C. He then attended Virginia Union University for a year before transferring to New York University (NYU), from which he graduated in 1931 with a Bachelor of Science in physical education. He was the first African-American to receive a B.S. degree from the Department of Physical Education at NYU.

McKinley coached boys and girls at the Abyssinian Baptist Church in Harlem in 1928–29, leading the boys basketball and track teams and girls basketball team to city championships.

== Head coaching record ==
Year	Team	Overall	Conference	Standing	Bowl/playoffs
Delaware State Hornets (Independent) (1931)
1931	Delaware State	2–2–1			
Delaware State:		2–2–1			
Total:		2–2–1			
