= 1931 Jefferson Bobcats football team =

American college football season

1931 Jefferson Bobcats football
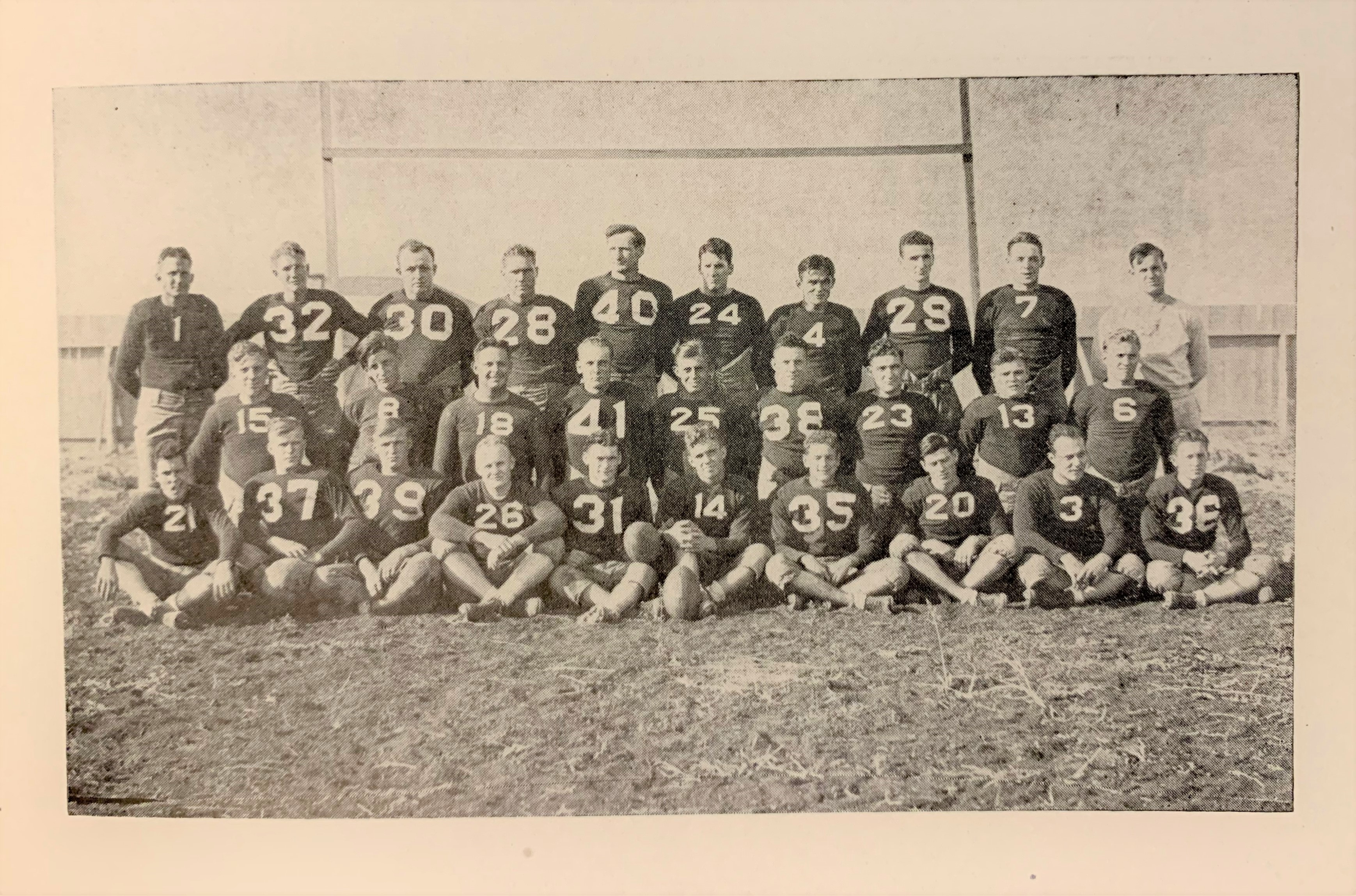
- Conference: Independent
- Record: 1–7–1
- Head coach: George C. Sutherland (1st season, 5 games); Chester (Gabby, Gump) Weatherford (1st season, 1 game); Frankie Estes (1st season, 3 games)
- Captain: Chester Weatherford
- Home stadium: Oak Cliff Field

1931 Southern college football independents records
	Conf.			Overall
Team	W	L	T	W		L		T
Catholic University		–		8	–	1	–	0
Texas Mines		–		7	–	1	–	0
Delaware		–		5	–	1	–	2
William & Mary Norfolk		–		1	–	0	–	1
Furman		–		5	–	2	–	2
George Washington		–		5	–	2	–	2
Texas Tech		–		6	–	3	–	0
Troy State		–		6	–	3	–	0
Middle Tennessee State Teachers		–		6	–	4	–	0
Navy		–		5	–	5	–	1
Wake Forest		–		4	–	4	–	0
Western Carolina		–		4	–	4	–	0
Davidson		–		4	–	4	–	2
Western Maryland		–		4	–	4	–	2
Delaware State		–		2	–	2	–	1
Georgetown		–		4	–	5	–	1
Richmond		–		4	–	5	–	0
West Virginia		–		4	–	6	–	0
Oglethorpe		–		3	–	6	–	0
South Georgia Teachers		–		2	–	6	–	0
Jefferson (TX)		–		1	–	7	–	1
Jacksonville State		–		0	–	7	–	1

The 1931 Jefferson Bobcats football team was an American football team that represented Jefferson University (formerly known as Jefferson Law School) during the 1931 college football season. In its second season of intercollegiate football, Jefferson compiled a 1–7–1 record. George C. Sutherland was the head coach and was succeeded by player-coach Frankie Estes. Chester ("Gump" or "Gabby") Weatherford was the team captain. The team played its home games at Oak Cliff Field in Dallas. Known as the Lawyers in 1930, the team was re-branded as the Bobcats for the 1931 season to go along with the Jefferson University re-branding.

Jefferson was opened in 1919 as a law school by Andrew J. Priest in downtown Dallas. One of its early faculty members was Judge Sarah T. Hughes. The school achieved some success training lawyers and had a high graduation rate and most students successfully passed the bar exam. Jefferson was rebranded as Jefferson University in 1931 as it added additional colleges such as engineering, liberal arts, business, commerce, and secretarial training.

Playing against mostly junior college and smaller four-year college teams, Jefferson was only able to score seven points on the entire season. Despite the lack of scoring, the Bobcats were competitive in their early games, losing two games by a single touchdown, tying one game at 0–0 and then finally winning when the other team missed an extra point for a 7–6 victory. Thereafter, the team was blown out, with an especially bad loss coming against a top all-boys preparatory school in Dallas, Terrill Prep School, losing by a 52–0 score.

== Schedule ==
Date	Opponent	Site	Result	Source
September 25	Paris	Oak Cliff Field; Dallas, TX	L 0–7	
October 3	at Hillsboro	Hillsboro, TX	L 0–19	
October 10	Weatherford	Oak Cliff Field; Dallas, TX	L 0–6	
October 17	Decatur Baptist	Oak Cliff Field; Dallas, TX	T 0–0	
October 23	Simmons (TX) freshmen	Oak Cliff Field; Dallas, TX	W 7–6	
October 30	at Terrill Prep School	Highland Park Stadium; University Park, TX	L 0–52	
November 6	at Southeastern Oklahoma State	Durant, OK	L 0–60	
November 13	at North Texas State freshmen	Denton, TX	L 0–14	
November 20	at Tarleton Agricultural College	Stephenville, TX	L 0–34	
