= 1931 William & Mary Indians football team =

American college football season

1931 William & Mary Indians football
- Conference: Virginia Conference
- Record: 5–2–2 (4–1 Virginia)
- Head coach: John Kellison (1st season)
- Captain: Otis Douglas

1931 Virginia Conference football standings
	Conf.					Overall
Team	W		L		T	W		L		T
Randolph–Macon $	5	–	1	–	0	7	–	1	–	1
William & Mary	4	–	1	–	0	5	–	2	–	2
Richmond	3	–	2	–	0	4	–	5	–	0
Roanoke	2	–	3	–	0	5	–	4	–	0
Emory and Henry	2	–	3	–	0	6	–	5	–	0
Lynchburg	2	–	3	–	0	4	–	6	–	0
Hampden–Sydney	2	–	3	–	0	3	–	6	–	0
Bridgewater	0	–	4	–	0	0	–	5	–	0
$ – Conference champion

The 1931 William & Mary Indians football team represented the College of William & Mary as a member of the Virginia Conference during the 1931 college football season. Led by first-year head coach John Kellison, the Indians compiled an overall record of 5–2–2 with a mark of 4–1 in conference play, placing second in the Virginia Conference.

== Schedule ==
Date	Opponent	Site	Result	Attendance	Source
September 26	Guilford*	Cary Field; Williamsburg, VA	W 32–0		
October 3	at Navy*	Thompson Stadium; Annapolis, MD	L 6–13		
October 10	Randolph–Macon	Cary Field; Williamsburg, VA	W 9–2		
October 17	vs. VPI*	City Stadium; Richmond, VA	T 6–6		
October 24	Bridgewater	Cary Field; Williamsburg, VA	W 95–0		
October 31	vs. Washington and Lee*	Bain Field; Norfolk, VA	T 0–0		
November 7	Roanoke^{†}	Cary Field; Williamsburg, VA	W 13–6		
November 14	at Emory and Henry	Fullerton Field; Emory, VA	W 24–0		
November 26	at Richmond	City Stadium; Richmond, VA (rivalry)	L 2–6	14,000	
*Non-conference game; ^{†}Homecoming
