= 1931 Davidson Wildcats football team =

American college football season

1931 Davidson Wildcats football
- Conference: Independent
- Record: 4–4–2
- Head coach: William L. Younger (9th season)
- Home stadium: Richardson Field

1931 Southern college football independents records
	Conf.			Overall
Team	W	L	T	W		L		T
Catholic University		–		8	–	1	–	0
Texas Mines		–		7	–	1	–	0
Delaware		–		5	–	1	–	2
William & Mary Norfolk		–		1	–	0	–	1
Furman		–		5	–	2	–	2
George Washington		–		5	–	2	–	2
Texas Tech		–		6	–	3	–	0
Troy State		–		6	–	3	–	0
Middle Tennessee State Teachers		–		6	–	4	–	0
Navy		–		5	–	5	–	1
Wake Forest		–		4	–	4	–	0
Western Carolina		–		4	–	4	–	0
Davidson		–		4	–	4	–	2
Western Maryland		–		4	–	4	–	2
Delaware State		–		2	–	2	–	1
Georgetown		–		4	–	5	–	1
Richmond		–		4	–	5	–	0
West Virginia		–		4	–	6	–	0
Oglethorpe		–		3	–	6	–	0
South Georgia Teachers		–		2	–	6	–	0
Jefferson (TX)		–		1	–	7	–	1
Jacksonville State		–		0	–	7	–	1

The 1931 Davidson Wildcats football team was an American football team that represented Davidson College as an independent during the 1931 college football season. In their ninth year under head coach William L. Younger, the team compiled a 4–4–2 record.

== Schedule ==
Date	Opponent	Site	Result	Attendance	Source
September 19	Elon	Richardson Field; Davidson, NC	W 13–2		
September 26	vs. NC State	World War Memorial Stadium; Greensboro, NC	L 7–20	7,000	
October 3	Washington and Lee	Wilson Field; Lexington, VA	W 7–0		
October 10	at VPI	Miles Stadium; Blacksburg, VA	L 6–18		
October 17	Duke^{†}	Richardson Field; Davidson, NC	T 0–0		
October 24	Erskine	Richardson Field; Davidson, NC	T 0–0		
October 31	VMI	Richardson Field; Davidson, NC	W 7–0		
November 7	The Citadel	Richardson Field; Davidson, NC	W 14–7		
November 14	at North Carolina	Kenan Memorial Stadium; Chapel Hill, NC	L 0–20	7,000	
November 26	vs. Wake Forest	Central High School Stadium; Charlotte, NC	L 0–7	8,000	
^{†}Homecoming
