= 1931 William & Mary Norfolk Division Braves football team =

American college football season

1931 William & Mary Norfolk Division Braves football
- Conference: Independent
- Record: 1–0–1
- Head coach: Tommy Scott (2nd season)

1931 Southern college football independents records
	Conf.			Overall
Team	W	L	T	W		L		T
Catholic University		–		8	–	1	–	0
Texas Mines		–		7	–	1	–	0
Delaware		–		5	–	1	–	2
William & Mary Norfolk		–		1	–	0	–	1
Furman		–		5	–	2	–	2
George Washington		–		5	–	2	–	2
Texas Tech		–		6	–	3	–	0
Troy State		–		6	–	3	–	0
Middle Tennessee State Teachers		–		6	–	4	–	0
Navy		–		5	–	5	–	1
Wake Forest		–		4	–	4	–	0
Western Carolina		–		4	–	4	–	0
Davidson		–		4	–	4	–	2
Western Maryland		–		4	–	4	–	2
Delaware State		–		2	–	2	–	1
Georgetown		–		4	–	5	–	1
Richmond		–		4	–	5	–	0
West Virginia		–		4	–	6	–	0
Oglethorpe		–		3	–	6	–	0
South Georgia Teachers		–		2	–	6	–	0
Jefferson (TX)		–		1	–	7	–	1
Jacksonville State		–		0	–	7	–	1

The 1931 William & Mary Norfolk Division Braves football team represented the Norfolk Division of the College of William & Mary, now referred to as Old Dominion University, during the 1931 college football season. They finished with a 1–0–1 record.

== Schedule ==
Date	Opponent	Site	Result	Source
November 11	Wingate	Norfolk, VA	W 7–0	
November 21	Campbell	Norfolk, VA	T 0–0	
