= 1931 Southern Illinois Maroons football team =

American college football season

1931 Southern Illinois Maroons football
- Conference: Illinois Intercollegiate Athletic Conference
- Record: 7–2 (4–2 IIAC)
- Head coach: William McAndrew (15th season)

1931 Illinois Intercollegiate Athletic Conference football standings
	Conf.					Overall
Team	W		L		T	W		L		T
Monmouth (IL) $	5	–	0	–	1	9	–	0	–	1
Millikin	4	–	1	–	0	6	–	3	–	0
Bradley	4	–	1	–	0	5	–	3	–	0
Augustana (IL)	3	–	1	–	2	5	–	2	–	2
St. Viator	5	–	2	–	0	5	–	2	–	0
Southern Illinois	4	–	2	–	0	7	–	2	–	0
North Central	4	–	2	–	0	5	–	2	–	0
Northern Illinois State	4	–	2	–	0	5	–	3	–	0
Carthage	3	–	3	–	1	4	–	4	–	1
Elmhurst	3	–	3	–	0	4	–	4	–	0
Knox (IL)	2	–	2	–	1	3	–	5	–	1
Illinois Wesleyan	3	–	3	–	0	3	–	5	–	0
McKendree	2	–	3	–	1	4	–	4	–	1
Eastern Illinois	2	–	3	–	0	3	–	4	–	0
Mount Morris	1	–	2	–	1	4	–	4	–	1
Eureka	2	–	4	–	1	3	–	4	–	1
Shurtleff	2	–	4	–	1	3	–	4	–	1
Western Illinois	2	–	4	–	0	2	–	6	–	0
Illinois College	1	–	4	–	2	2	–	5	–	2
Illinois State Normal	1	–	6	–	1	1	–	6	–	1
Lake Forest	0	–	2	–	2	0	–	2	–	4
Wheaton (IL)	0	–	3	–	0	3	–	5	–	0
$ – Conference champion

The 1931 Southern Illinois Maroons football team was an American football team that represented Southern Illinois Normal University (now known as Southern Illinois University Carbondale) in the Illinois Intercollegiate Athletic Conference (IIAC) during the 1931 college football season. In its 15th season under head coach William McAndrew, the team compiled a 7–2 record.

== Schedule ==
Date	Opponent	Site	Result	Source
September 25	Scott Field*	Carbondale, IL	W 19–0	
October 2	Mount Morris	Carbondale, IL	W 6–0	
October 9	at Cape Girardeau*	Houck Stadium; Cape Girardeau, MO	W 6–0	
October 17	at Eastern Illinois	Schahrer Field; Charleston, IL	W 6–0	
October 24	at McKendree	Lebanon, IL	W 7–0	
October 31	at Illinois State Normal	McCormick Field; Normal, IL	L 0–14	
November 6	Shurtleff	Carbondale, IL	L 0–6	
November 13	Cape Girardeau*	Carbondale, IL	W 12–0	
November 21	Northern Illinois State	Carbondale, IL	W 7–6	
*Non-conference game
