= 1931 Catholic University Cardinals football team =

American college football season

1931 Catholic University Cardinals football
- Conference: Independent
- Record: 8–1
- Head coach: Dutch Bergman (2nd season)
- Home stadium: Brookland Stadium, Griffith Stadium

1931 Southern college football independents records
	Conf.			Overall
Team	W	L	T	W		L		T
Catholic University		–		8	–	1	–	0
Texas Mines		–		7	–	1	–	0
Delaware		–		5	–	1	–	2
William & Mary Norfolk		–		1	–	0	–	1
Furman		–		5	–	2	–	2
George Washington		–		5	–	2	–	2
Texas Tech		–		6	–	3	–	0
Troy State		–		6	–	3	–	0
Middle Tennessee State Teachers		–		6	–	4	–	0
Navy		–		5	–	5	–	1
Wake Forest		–		4	–	4	–	0
Western Carolina		–		4	–	4	–	0
Davidson		–		4	–	4	–	2
Western Maryland		–		4	–	4	–	2
Delaware State		–		2	–	2	–	1
Georgetown		–		4	–	5	–	1
Richmond		–		4	–	5	–	0
West Virginia		–		4	–	6	–	0
Oglethorpe		–		3	–	6	–	0
South Georgia Teachers		–		2	–	6	–	0
Jefferson (TX)		–		1	–	7	–	1
Jacksonville State		–		0	–	7	–	1

The 1931 Catholic University Cardinals football team was an American football team that represented the Catholic University of America as an independent during the 1931 college football season. In its second year under head coach Dutch Bergman, the team compiled an 8–1 record and outscored opponents by a total of 249 to 84. After losing the first game of the season to Boston College, the Cardinals won their final eight games.

== Schedule ==
Date	Opponent	Site	Result	Source
September 26	at Boston College	Fenway Park; Boston, MA	L 7–28	
October 3	CCNY	Brookland Stadium; Washington, DC	W 53–18	
October 9	Gallaudet	Brookland Stadium; Washington, DC	W 91–0	
October 23	at NC State	Riddick Stadium; Raleigh, NC	W 12–7	
October 30	at Duquesne	Forbes Field; Pittsburgh, PA	W 20–12	
November 7	Manhattan	Brookland Stadium; Washington, DC	W 19–6	
November 13	Saint Francis (PA)	Griffith Stadium; Washington, DC	W 21–6	
November 21	Providence	Brookland Stadium; Washington, DC	W 13–7	
November 26	Loyola (MD)	Brookland Stadium; Washington, DC	W 13–0	
