= 1931 Troy State Red Wave football team =

American college football season

1931 Troy State Red Wave football
- Conference: Independent
- Record: 6–3
- Head coach: Albert Elmore (1st season)
- Home stadium: Pace Field

1931 Southern college football independents records
	Conf.			Overall
Team	W	L	T	W		L		T
Catholic University		–		8	–	1	–	0
Texas Mines		–		7	–	1	–	0
Delaware		–		5	–	1	–	2
William & Mary Norfolk		–		1	–	0	–	1
Furman		–		5	–	2	–	2
George Washington		–		5	–	2	–	2
Texas Tech		–		6	–	3	–	0
Troy State		–		6	–	3	–	0
Middle Tennessee State Teachers		–		6	–	4	–	0
Navy		–		5	–	5	–	1
Wake Forest		–		4	–	4	–	0
Western Carolina		–		4	–	4	–	0
Davidson		–		4	–	4	–	2
Western Maryland		–		4	–	4	–	2
Delaware State		–		2	–	2	–	1
Georgetown		–		4	–	5	–	1
Richmond		–		4	–	5	–	0
West Virginia		–		4	–	6	–	0
Oglethorpe		–		3	–	6	–	0
South Georgia Teachers		–		2	–	6	–	0
Jefferson (TX)		–		1	–	7	–	1
Jacksonville State		–		0	–	7	–	1

The 1931 Troy State Red Wave football team represented Troy State Teachers College (now known as Troy University) as an independent during the 1931 college football season. Led by first-year head coach Albert Elmore, the Red Wave compiled an overall record of 6–3.

== Schedule ==
Date	Opponent	Site	Result	Source
September 25	at Norman Park Junior College	Moultrie, GA	L 0–18	
October 3	at Jacksonville State	Daguette Field; Jacksonville, AL (rivalry)	W 24–6	
October 10	at Georgia State College	Tifton, GA	L 0–28	
October 16	Palmer College	Pace Field; Troy, AL	W 43–6	
October 24	Fort Benning	Pace Field; Troy, AL	W 20–7	
October 30	East Mississippi	Pace Field; Troy, AL	W 18–7	
November 11	Auburn reserves	Pace Field; Troy, AL	W 12–6	
November 14	at Bob Jones	Panama City, FL	W 13–0	
November 20	Marion	Pace Field; Troy, AL	L 6–8	
