= 1931 Texas Tech Matadors football team =

American college football season

1931 Texas Tech Matadors football
- Conference: Independent
- Record: 6–3
- Head coach: Pete Cawthon (2nd season)
- Offensive scheme: Single-wing
- Base defense: 6–2
- Captain: Jack Durham
- Home stadium: Tech Field

1931 Southern college football independents records
	Conf.			Overall
Team	W	L	T	W		L		T
Catholic University		–		8	–	1	–	0
Texas Mines		–		7	–	1	–	0
Delaware		–		5	–	1	–	2
William & Mary Norfolk		–		1	–	0	–	1
Furman		–		5	–	2	–	2
George Washington		–		5	–	2	–	2
Texas Tech		–		6	–	3	–	0
Troy State		–		6	–	3	–	0
Middle Tennessee State Teachers		–		6	–	4	–	0
Navy		–		5	–	5	–	1
Wake Forest		–		4	–	4	–	0
Western Carolina		–		4	–	4	–	0
Davidson		–		4	–	4	–	2
Western Maryland		–		4	–	4	–	2
Delaware State		–		2	–	2	–	1
Georgetown		–		4	–	5	–	1
Richmond		–		4	–	5	–	0
West Virginia		–		4	–	6	–	0
Oglethorpe		–		3	–	6	–	0
South Georgia Teachers		–		2	–	6	–	0
Jefferson (TX)		–		1	–	7	–	1
Jacksonville State		–		0	–	7	–	1

The 1931 Texas Tech Matadors football team represented Texas Technological College—now known as Texas Tech University—as an independent during the 1931 college football season. In their second season under head coach Pete Cawthon, the Matadors compiled a 6–3 record and outscored opponents by a combined total of 150 to 66. The team played its home games at Tech Field.

== Schedule ==
Date	Opponent	Site	Result	Attendance	Source
September 25	West Texas State	Tech Field; Lubbock, TX	W 21–0	5,000	
October 3	at New Mexico A&M	Miller Field; Las Cruces, NM	W 7–0		
October 13	vs. Haskell	Fair Park Stadium; Dallas, TX	L 0–8		
October 23	Colorado Mines	Tech Field; Lubbock, TX	W 46–0	4,500	
October 31	at Baylor	Carroll Field; Waco, TX (rivalry)	L 0–32		
November 6	Abilene Christian	Tech Field; Lubbock, TX	W 26–6		
November 11	at Texas Mines	El Paso High School Stadium; El Paso, TX	L 12–14	3,000	
November 20	New Mexico^{†}	Tech Field; Lubbock, TX	W 32–6	2,500	
November 26	at Simmons (TX)	Parramore Field; Abilene, TX	W 6–0		
^{†}Homecoming
