= 1931 Western Maryland Green Terror football team =

American college football season

1931 Western Maryland Green Terror football
- Conference: Independent
- Record: 4–4–2
- Head coach: Dick Harlow (6th season)
- Captain: L. W. Pincura
- Home stadium: Hoffa Field, Baltimore Stadium

1931 Southern college football independents records
	Conf.			Overall
Team	W	L	T	W		L		T
Catholic University		–		8	–	1	–	0
Texas Mines		–		7	–	1	–	0
Delaware		–		5	–	1	–	2
William & Mary Norfolk		–		1	–	0	–	1
Furman		–		5	–	2	–	2
George Washington		–		5	–	2	–	2
Texas Tech		–		6	–	3	–	0
Troy State		–		6	–	3	–	0
Middle Tennessee State Teachers		–		6	–	4	–	0
Navy		–		5	–	5	–	1
Wake Forest		–		4	–	4	–	0
Western Carolina		–		4	–	4	–	0
Davidson		–		4	–	4	–	2
Western Maryland		–		4	–	4	–	2
Delaware State		–		2	–	2	–	1
Georgetown		–		4	–	5	–	1
Richmond		–		4	–	5	–	0
West Virginia		–		4	–	6	–	0
Oglethorpe		–		3	–	6	–	0
South Georgia Teachers		–		2	–	6	–	0
Jefferson (TX)		–		1	–	7	–	1
Jacksonville State		–		0	–	7	–	1

The 1931 Western Maryland Green Terror football team was an American football team that represented Western Maryland College (now known as McDaniel College) as an independent during the 1931 college football season. In its sixth season under head coach Dick Harlow, the team compiled a 4–4–2 record and shut out five of its ten opponents. L. W. Pincura was the team's captain. Western Maryland played home games at Hoffa Field on Westminster, Maryland.

Harlow served nine years as Western Maryland's head football coach. During those years, the school's football team compiled a 60–13–7 record. He was later inducted into the College Football Hall of Fame.

During the 1931 season, the team played its home games at Hoffa Field in Westminster, Maryland (two games) and Baltimore Stadium in Baltimore, Maryland (five games).

== Schedule ==
Date	Opponent	Site	Result	Attendance	Source
October 3	at Georgetown	Griffith Stadium; Washington, DC	L 7–25	12,000	
October 10	St. John's (MD)	Baltimore Stadium; Baltimore, MD	W 59–0	3,000	
October 17	Washington & Jefferson	Baltimore Stadium; Baltimore, MD	L 12–13	8,000	
October 23	at Duquesne	Forbes Field; Pittsburgh, PA	T 0–0	10,000	
October 31	Loyola (MD)	Baltimore Stadium; Baltimore, MD	T 7–7	2,000	
November 7	Boston College	Baltimore Stadium; Baltimore, MD	L 13–19	5,000	
November 13	at Johns Hopkins	Homewood Field; Baltimore, MD	W 40–0	8,500	
November 21	Mount St. Mary's^{†}	Hoffa Field; Westminster, Maryland	W 20–0		
November 28	Muhlenberg	Hoffa Field; Westminster, MD	W 34–0		
December 5	Maryland	Baltimore Stadium; Baltimore, MD	L 6–41	12,000	
^{†}Homecoming
