= 1931 Middle Tennessee State Teachers football team =

American college football season

1931 Middle Tennessee State Teachers football
- Conference: Independent
- Record: 6–4
- Head coach: Frank Faulkinberry (6th season)
- Captain: Emerson Hendrix

1931 Southern college football independents records
	Conf.			Overall
Team	W	L	T	W		L		T
Catholic University		–		8	–	1	–	0
Texas Mines		–		7	–	1	–	0
Delaware		–		5	–	1	–	2
William & Mary Norfolk		–		1	–	0	–	1
Furman		–		5	–	2	–	2
George Washington		–		5	–	2	–	2
Texas Tech		–		6	–	3	–	0
Troy State		–		6	–	3	–	0
Middle Tennessee State Teachers		–		6	–	4	–	0
Navy		–		5	–	5	–	1
Wake Forest		–		4	–	4	–	0
Western Carolina		–		4	–	4	–	0
Davidson		–		4	–	4	–	2
Western Maryland		–		4	–	4	–	2
Delaware State		–		2	–	2	–	1
Georgetown		–		4	–	5	–	1
Richmond		–		4	–	5	–	0
West Virginia		–		4	–	6	–	0
Oglethorpe		–		3	–	6	–	0
South Georgia Teachers		–		2	–	6	–	0
Jefferson (TX)		–		1	–	7	–	1
Jacksonville State		–		0	–	7	–	1

The 1931 Middle Tennessee State Teachers football team represented the Middle Tennessee State Teachers College (now known as Middle Tennessee State University) as an independent during the 1931 college football season. Led by sixth-year head coach Frank Faulkinberry, Middle Tennessee State Teachers compiled a record of 6–4. The team's captain was Emerson Hendrix.

== Schedule ==
Date	Opponent	Site	Result	Source
September 19	at Chattanooga	Chamberlain Field; Chattanooga, TN	L 0–19	
September 26	Lincoln Memorial	Murfreesboro, TN	W 47–0	
October 2	at Tennessee Junior	Martin, TN	W 19–0	
October 9	at Bethel (KY)	Russellville, KY	W 25–0	
October 17	at Western Kentucky State Normal	Bowling Green, KY (rivalry)	L 0–12	
October 24	Tennessee Wesleyan	Murfreesboro, TN	W 26–6	
October 31	at Murray State	Cutchin Stadium; Murray, KY	L 7–13	
November 7	West Tennessee State Teachers	Murfreesboro, TN	W 15–0	
November 14	Miami (FL)	Murfreesboro, TN	W 24–6	
November 26	at Tennessee Tech	Cookeville, TN	L 7–19	
