= 1931 West Virginia Mountaineers football team =

American college football season

1931 West Virginia Mountaineers football
- Conference: Independent
- Record: 4–6
- Head coach: Greasy Neale (1st season)
- Captain: John Doyle
- Home stadium: Mountaineer Field

1931 Southern college football independents records
	Conf.			Overall
Team	W	L	T	W		L		T
Catholic University		–		8	–	1	–	0
Texas Mines		–		7	–	1	–	0
Delaware		–		5	–	1	–	2
William & Mary Norfolk		–		1	–	0	–	1
Furman		–		5	–	2	–	2
George Washington		–		5	–	2	–	2
Texas Tech		–		6	–	3	–	0
Troy State		–		6	–	3	–	0
Middle Tennessee State Teachers		–		6	–	4	–	0
Navy		–		5	–	5	–	1
Wake Forest		–		4	–	4	–	0
Western Carolina		–		4	–	4	–	0
Davidson		–		4	–	4	–	2
Western Maryland		–		4	–	4	–	2
Delaware State		–		2	–	2	–	1
Georgetown		–		4	–	5	–	1
Richmond		–		4	–	5	–	0
West Virginia		–		4	–	6	–	0
Oglethorpe		–		3	–	6	–	0
South Georgia Teachers		–		2	–	6	–	0
Jefferson (TX)		–		1	–	7	–	1
Jacksonville State		–		0	–	7	–	1

The 1931 West Virginia Mountaineers football team was an American football team that represented West Virginia University as an independent during the 1931 college football season. In its first season under head coach Greasy Neale, the team compiled a 4–6 record and was outscored by a total of 122 to 91. The team played its home games at Mountaineer Field in Morgantown, West Virginia. John Doyle was the team captain.

== Schedule ==
Date	Opponent	Site	Result	Attendance	Source
September 26	Duquesne	Mountaineer Field; Morgantown, WV	W 14–6		
October 3	at Fordham	Polo Grounds; New York, NY	L 7–20	18,000	
October 10	at Pittsburgh	Pitt Stadium; Pittsburgh, PA (rivalry)	L 0–34	18,000–20,000	
October 17	vs. Washington and Lee	Laidley Field; Charleston, WV	W 19–0	12,000	
October 23	at Detroit	University of Detroit Stadium; Detroit, MI	L 7–9		
October 31	Kansas State	Mountaineer Field; Morgantown, WV	L 0–19		
November 7	West Virginia Wesleyan	Mountaineer Field; Morgantown, WV	W 12–7	7,500	
November 14	at Georgetown	Griffith Stadium; Washington, DC	L 0–13	8,000	
November 21	Penn State	Mountaineer Field; Morgantown, WV (rivalry)	W 19–0	10,000	
November 28	vs. Washington & Jefferson	Wheeling, WV	L 13–14		
