= 1931 George Washington Colonials football team =

American university football team

1931 George Washington Colonials football
- Conference: Independent
- Record: 5–2–2
- Head coach: Jim Pixlee (3rd season)
- Home stadium: Griffith Stadium, Central High School Stadium

1931 Southern college football independents records
	Conf.			Overall
Team	W	L	T	W		L		T
Catholic University		–		8	–	1	–	0
Texas Mines		–		7	–	1	–	0
Delaware		–		5	–	1	–	2
William & Mary Norfolk		–		1	–	0	–	1
Furman		–		5	–	2	–	2
George Washington		–		5	–	2	–	2
Texas Tech		–		6	–	3	–	0
Troy State		–		6	–	3	–	0
Middle Tennessee State Teachers		–		6	–	4	–	0
Navy		–		5	–	5	–	1
Wake Forest		–		4	–	4	–	0
Western Carolina		–		4	–	4	–	0
Davidson		–		4	–	4	–	2
Western Maryland		–		4	–	4	–	2
Delaware State		–		2	–	2	–	1
Georgetown		–		4	–	5	–	1
Richmond		–		4	–	5	–	0
West Virginia		–		4	–	6	–	0
Oglethorpe		–		3	–	6	–	0
South Georgia Teachers		–		2	–	6	–	0
Jefferson (TX)		–		1	–	7	–	1
Jacksonville State		–		0	–	7	–	1

The 1931 George Washington Colonials football team was an American football team that represented George Washington University as an independent during the 1931 college football season. In its third season under head coach Jim Pixlee, the team compiled a 5–2–2 record. The December 12 game against Alabama alumni was a 10-minute game played as part of a fundraiser for the poor during which the Alabama alumni played three short games against teams from the District of Columbia.

== Schedule ==
Date	Opponent	Site	Result	Attendance	Source
September 26	Shenandoah	Central High School Stadium; Washington, DC	W 53–0		
October 3	Elon	Central High School Stadium; Washington, DC	W 43–0		
October 10	at Boston University	Nickerson Field; Weston, MA	W 14–0	4,000	
October 16	Tulsa	Griffith Stadium; Washington, DC	L 7–24	15,000	
October 31	at Iowa	Iowa Stadium; Iowa City, IA	L 0–7		
November 6	Salem	Griffith Stadium; Washington, DC	W 45–0	4,000	
November 20	Butler	Griffith Stadium; Washington, DC	W 32–7		
November 26	North Dakota	Griffith Stadium; Washington, DC	T 6–6		
December 12	Alabama alumni	Griffith Stadium; Washington, DV	T 0–0	12,000	
