= 1931 Appalachian State Mountaineers football team =

American college football season

1931 Appalachian State Mountaineers football

NSC champion

Charlotte Charity Game, W 15–7 vs. Catawba
- Conference: North State Conference
- Record: 9–2–2 (3–0 NSC)
- Head coach: C. B. Johnston (3rd season)
- Home stadium: College Field

1931 North State Conference football standings
	Conf.					Overall
Team	W		L		T	W		L		T
Appalachian State $	3	–	0	–	0	9	–	2	–	2
Catawba	2	–	1	–	0	7	–	3	–	1
Guilford	2	–	1	–	0	5	–	6	–	0
Elon	2	–	1	–	0	3	–	5	–	0
Lenoir–Rhyne	1	–	4	–	0	3	–	7	–	0
High Point	1	–	4	–	0	2	–	7	–	0
$ – Conference champion

The 1931 Appalachian State Mountaineers football team was an American football team that represented Appalachian State Teachers College (now known as Appalachian State University) as a member of the North State Conference during the 1931 college football season. In their third year under head coach C. B. Johnston, the Mountaineers compiled an overall record of 9–2–2, with a mark of 3–0 in conference play, finished as North State champion, and with a victory over Catawba in the Charlotte Charity Game.

== Schedule ==
Date	Opponent	Site	Result	Source
September 19	Campbell*	College Field; Boone, NC	W 20–6	
September 25	at Lenoir–Rhyne	Moretz Stadium; Hickory, NC	W 6–0	
October 3	High Point	College Field; Boone, NC	W 20–0	
October 10	at King*	Tenneva Field; Bristol, TN	W 20–0	
October 17	Piedmont*	College Field; Boone, NC	W 24–12	
October 24	at Catawba	Shuford Stadium; Salisbury, NC	W 7–6	
October 30	at Apprentice*	Apprentice Athletic Field; Newport News, VA	W 25–12	
October 31	at Langley Field*	Langley Field Stadium; Hampton, VA	L 3–6	
November 7	at Maryville (TN)*	Maryville, TN	T 6–6	
November 14	Bowdon College*	College Field; Boone, NC	T 6–6	
November 21	Concord State*	College Field; Boone, NC	W 25–0	
November 26	at Glenville State*	Glenville, WV	L 6–25	
December 5	vs. Catawba	Central Stadium; Charlotte, NC (Charlotte Charity Game)	W 15–7	
*Non-conference game
