= 1931 Georgetown Hoyas football team =

American college football season

1931 Georgetown Hoyas football
- Conference: Independent
- Record: 4–5–1
- Head coach: Tommy Mills (2nd season)
- Captain: Maurice Dubofsky
- Home stadium: Griffith Stadium

1931 Southern college football independents records
	Conf.			Overall
Team	W	L	T	W		L		T
Catholic University		–		8	–	1	–	0
Texas Mines		–		7	–	1	–	0
Delaware		–		5	–	1	–	2
William & Mary Norfolk		–		1	–	0	–	1
Furman		–		5	–	2	–	2
George Washington		–		5	–	2	–	2
Texas Tech		–		6	–	3	–	0
Troy State		–		6	–	3	–	0
Middle Tennessee State Teachers		–		6	–	4	–	0
Navy		–		5	–	5	–	1
Wake Forest		–		4	–	4	–	0
Western Carolina		–		4	–	4	–	0
Davidson		–		4	–	4	–	2
Western Maryland		–		4	–	4	–	2
Delaware State		–		2	–	2	–	1
Georgetown		–		4	–	5	–	1
Richmond		–		4	–	5	–	0
West Virginia		–		4	–	6	–	0
Oglethorpe		–		3	–	6	–	0
South Georgia Teachers		–		2	–	6	–	0
Jefferson (TX)		–		1	–	7	–	1
Jacksonville State		–		0	–	7	–	1

The 1931 Georgetown Hoyas football team represented Georgetown University as an independent during the 1931 college football season. Led by Tommy Mills in his second season as head coach, the team went 4–5–1.

== Schedule ==
Date	Opponent	Site	Result	Attendance	Source
September 26	Lebanon Valley	Griffith Stadium; Washington, DC	W 25–0		
October 3	Western Maryland	Griffith Stadium; Washington, DC	W 25–7	12,000	
October 10	at NYU	Yankee Stadium; Bronx, NY	L 0–34	35,000	
October 16	at Duquesne	Forbes Field; Pittsburgh, PA	T 0–0	5,000	
October 24	at Michigan State	College Field; East Lansing, MI	L 0–6		
October 31	at Boston College	Fenway Park; Boston, MA	L 2–20		
November 7	Bucknell	Griffith Stadium; Washington, DC	L 0–7		
November 14	West Virginia	Griffith Stadium; Washington, DC	W 13–10	8,000	
November 21	at Villanova	Villanova Stadium; Villanova, PA	W 13–6	7,000	
November 28	Detroit	Griffith Stadium; Washington, DC	L 0–6	10,000	
