= 1931 Navy Midshipmen football team =

American college football season

1931 Navy Midshipmen football
- Conference: Independent
- Record: 5–5–1
- Head coach: Edgar Miller (1st season)
- Captain: Magruder Tuttle
- Home stadium: Thompson Stadium

1931 Southern college football independents records
	Conf.			Overall
Team	W	L	T	W		L		T
Catholic University		–		8	–	1	–	0
Texas Mines		–		7	–	1	–	0
Delaware		–		5	–	1	–	2
William & Mary Norfolk		–		1	–	0	–	1
Furman		–		5	–	2	–	2
George Washington		–		5	–	2	–	2
Texas Tech		–		6	–	3	–	0
Troy State		–		6	–	3	–	0
Middle Tennessee State Teachers		–		6	–	4	–	0
Navy		–		5	–	5	–	1
Wake Forest		–		4	–	4	–	0
Western Carolina		–		4	–	4	–	0
Davidson		–		4	–	4	–	2
Western Maryland		–		4	–	4	–	2
Delaware State		–		2	–	2	–	1
Georgetown		–		4	–	5	–	1
Richmond		–		4	–	5	–	0
West Virginia		–		4	–	6	–	0
Oglethorpe		–		3	–	6	–	0
South Georgia Teachers		–		2	–	6	–	0
Jefferson (TX)		–		1	–	7	–	1
Jacksonville State		–		0	–	7	–	1

The 1931 Navy Midshipmen football team represented the United States Naval Academy during the 1931 college football season. In their first season under head coach Edgar Miller, the Midshipmen compiled a 5–5–1 record, shut out three opponents, but outscored all opponents by a combined score of 95 to 78.

== Schedule ==
Date	Opponent	Site	Result	Attendance	Source
October 3	William & Mary	Thompson Stadium; Annapolis, MD	W 13–6		
October 10	vs. Maryland	Griffith Stadium; Washington, DC (rivalry)	L 0–6	16,000	
October 17	Delaware	Thompson Stadium; Annapolis, MD	W 12–7	9,000	
October 24	at Princeton	Palmer Stadium; Princeton, NJ	W 15–0		
October 31	West Virginia Wesleyan	Thompson Stadium; Annapolis, MD	T 0–0		
November 7	at Ohio State	Ohio Stadium; Columbus, OH	L 0–20	60,640	
November 14	Notre Dame	Municipal Stadium; Baltimore, MD (rivalry)	L 0–20	56,861	
November 21	SMU	Thompson Stadium; Annapolis, MD (rivalry)	L 6–13	7,000	
November 28	Wooster	Thompson Stadium; Annapolis, MD	W 19–6		
December 5	at Penn	Franklin Field; Philadelphia, PA	W 6–0		
December 12	vs. Army	Yankee Stadium; Bronx, NY (Army–Navy Game)	L 7–17		
