= 1931 Oglethorpe Stormy Petrels football team =

American college football season

1931 Oglethorpe Stormy Petrels football
- Conference: Independent
- Record: 3–6
- Head coach: Harry J. Robertson (8th season)
- Captain: Parker Bryant
- Home stadium: Hermance Stadium

1931 Southern college football independents records
	Conf.			Overall
Team	W	L	T	W		L		T
Catholic University		–		8	–	1	–	0
Texas Mines		–		7	–	1	–	0
Delaware		–		5	–	1	–	2
William & Mary Norfolk		–		1	–	0	–	1
Furman		–		5	–	2	–	2
George Washington		–		5	–	2	–	2
Texas Tech		–		6	–	3	–	0
Troy State		–		6	–	3	–	0
Middle Tennessee State Teachers		–		6	–	4	–	0
Navy		–		5	–	5	–	1
Wake Forest		–		4	–	4	–	0
Western Carolina		–		4	–	4	–	0
Davidson		–		4	–	4	–	2
Western Maryland		–		4	–	4	–	2
Delaware State		–		2	–	2	–	1
Georgetown		–		4	–	5	–	1
Richmond		–		4	–	5	–	0
West Virginia		–		4	–	6	–	0
Oglethorpe		–		3	–	6	–	0
South Georgia Teachers		–		2	–	6	–	0
Jefferson (TX)		–		1	–	7	–	1
Jacksonville State		–		0	–	7	–	1

The 1931 Oglethorpe Stormy Petrels football team represented Oglethorpe University in the sport of American football during the 1931 college football season. The first game of the season against rival, Chattanooga, gave Oglethorpe her first loss at Hermance Stadium. Oglethorpe defeated Wake Forest at home on Friday, November 13.

== Schedule ==
Date	Opponent	Site	Result	Attendance	Source
September 26	Chattanooga	Hermance Stadium; North Atlanta, GA	L 7–12		
October 2	at Duquesne	Forbes Field; Pittsburgh, PA	L 0–6	6,000	
October 9	at Manhattan	Polo Grounds; New York, NY	L 0–13	15,000	
October 16	at Loyola (LA)	Loyola University Stadium; New Orleans, LA	L 7–12	10,000	
October 24	Furman	Hermance Stadium; North Atlanta, GA	W 3–0		
October 31	at Clemson	Riggs Field; Clemson, SC	W 12–0		
November 13	Wake Forest	Hermance Stadium; North Atlanta, GA	W 37–0		
November 21	vs. Haskell	Soldier Field; Chicago, IL	L 6–31	10,000	
November 26	Mercer	Hermance Stadium; North Atlanta, GA	L 0–20		
