= 1931 Texas Mines Miners football team =

American college football season

1931 Texas Mines Miners football
- Conference: Independent
- Record: 7–1
- Head coach: Mack Saxon (3rd season)
- Home stadium: El Paso High School Stadium

1931 Southern college football independents records
	Conf.			Overall
Team	W	L	T	W		L		T
Catholic University		–		8	–	1	–	0
Texas Mines		–		7	–	1	–	0
Delaware		–		5	–	1	–	2
William & Mary Norfolk		–		1	–	0	–	1
Furman		–		5	–	2	–	2
George Washington		–		5	–	2	–	2
Texas Tech		–		6	–	3	–	0
Troy State		–		6	–	3	–	0
Middle Tennessee State Teachers		–		6	–	4	–	0
Navy		–		5	–	5	–	1
Wake Forest		–		4	–	4	–	0
Western Carolina		–		4	–	4	–	0
Davidson		–		4	–	4	–	2
Western Maryland		–		4	–	4	–	2
Delaware State		–		2	–	2	–	1
Georgetown		–		4	–	5	–	1
Richmond		–		4	–	5	–	0
West Virginia		–		4	–	6	–	0
Oglethorpe		–		3	–	6	–	0
South Georgia Teachers		–		2	–	6	–	0
Jefferson (TX)		–		1	–	7	–	1
Jacksonville State		–		0	–	7	–	1

The 1931 Texas Mines Miners football team was an American football team that represented Texas School of Mines (now known as the University of Texas at El Paso) as an independent during the 1931 college football season. In its third season under head coach Mack Saxon, the team compiled a 7–1 record and outscored opponents by a total of 136 to 84.

== Schedule ==
Date	Opponent	Site	Result	Attendance	Source
September 26	Wayland	El Paso High School Stadium; El Paso, TX	W 0–0	2,000	
October 3	Arizona State	El Paso High School Stadium; El Paso, TX	W 27–13	2,500	
October 10	vs. Sul Ross	Highland Fair; Marfa, TX	W 26–0		
October 17	Simmons (TX)	El Paso High School Stadium; El Paso, TX	L 0–45		
October 24	at New Mexico Military	Roswell, NM	W 31–6		
October 31	McMurry	El Paso High School Stadium; El Paso, TX	W 18–7		
November 11	Texas Tech	El Paso High School Stadium; El Paso, TX	W 14–12	3,000	
November 21	New Mexico A&M^{†}	El Paso High School Stadium; El Paso, TX (rivalry)	W 20–0	5,000	
^{†}Homecoming
