= Maurice Dubofsky =

American football player and coach (1909–1970)

Profile
- Position: Guard

Personal information
- Born: August 10, 1909; Hartford, Connecticut, U.S.
- Died: January 25, 1970 (aged 60); Bethesda, Maryland, U.S.
- Listed height: 5 ft 10 in (1.78 m)
- Listed weight: 210 lb (95 kg)

Career information
- High school: Weaver (CT)
- College: Georgetown

Career history
- New York Giants (1932); Shenandoah Presidents (1933–1934); Reading Keys (1935); Paterson Panthers (1936); Baltimore Blue Birds (1937)

Awards and highlights
- Third-team All-American (1931)
- Stats at Pro Football Reference

Maurice "Mush" Dubofsky (August 10, 1909 – January 25, 1970) was an American football player and coach. He played college football at Georgetown and professional football for the New York Giants. He later served as the line coach for the Georgetown football team for 16 years and coached at the high school level for several years. He was also the head coach of Georgetown's club football team in 1968 and 1969.

== Early life ==
Dubofsy was born in 1909 in Hartford, Connecticut. He attended Weaver High School in Hartford, winning a reputation as "one of the outstanding athletes in the history of Hartford schoolboy sports." He enrolled at Georgetown University and played at the guard position for the Georgetown Hoyas football team from 1928 to 1931. He was selected by his teammates as captain of the 1931 Georgetown team. He was also selected as a first-team guard on the 1931 All-American Catholic football team. He was elected to the Georgetown Athletic Hall of Fame in 1953.

== Professional football ==
In June 1932, one week after graduating from Georgetown, Dubofsky turned down an offer to coach at Georgetown and instead signed a contract to play professional football for the New York Giants of the National Football League (NFL). He appeared in five games, two as a starter, for the Giants. He also played professional football for the Shenandoah Presidents in 1933 and 1934, the Reading Keys in 1935, the Paterson Panthers of the American Association in 1936 and the Baltimore Blue Birds of the Dixie League in 1937. He earned a reputation as "a 60-minute man", "a play-buster par excellence", and "a thunderbolt tackler."

== Coaching and later years ==
Dubofsky received a law degree from Georgetown but never practiced law. He was hired as the line coach for the Georgetown football team in 1933 and remained in that post for 11 years. During World War II, he served as a lieutenant in the United States Navy. After the war, he returned to Georgetown as line coach and held that position until Georgetown terminated its football program after the 1950 season. Dubofsky then coached high school football. He was the head football coach St. John's High School in Washington, DC, for 11 years, during which his teams won nine Catholic league championships. He was also the head coach at South Catholic High School in Pittsburgh for five years. He returned to Georgetown in 1968 as head coach of Georgetown's club football team. He also operated an insurance agency in Washington, DC, for several years.

Dubofsky suffered a heart attack in October 1969. Three months later, in January 1970, he died at Bethesda, Maryland, after sustaining another heart attack.

Since 1976, Georgetown has annually presented the Maurice A. Dubofsky Award to the best student athlete on the team.
