= 1931 Jacksonville State Eagle Owls football team =

American college football season

1931 Jacksonville State Eagle Owls football
- Conference: Independent
- Record: 0–7–1
- Head coach: T. B. Shotts (1st season)
- Home stadium: Daguette Field

1931 Southern college football independents records
	Conf.			Overall
Team	W	L	T	W		L		T
Catholic University		–		8	–	1	–	0
Texas Mines		–		7	–	1	–	0
Delaware		–		5	–	1	–	2
William & Mary Norfolk		–		1	–	0	–	1
Furman		–		5	–	2	–	2
George Washington		–		5	–	2	–	2
Texas Tech		–		6	–	3	–	0
Troy State		–		6	–	3	–	0
Middle Tennessee State Teachers		–		6	–	4	–	0
Navy		–		5	–	5	–	1
Wake Forest		–		4	–	4	–	0
Western Carolina		–		4	–	4	–	0
Davidson		–		4	–	4	–	2
Western Maryland		–		4	–	4	–	2
Delaware State		–		2	–	2	–	1
Georgetown		–		4	–	5	–	1
Richmond		–		4	–	5	–	0
West Virginia		–		4	–	6	–	0
Oglethorpe		–		3	–	6	–	0
South Georgia Teachers		–		2	–	6	–	0
Jefferson (TX)		–		1	–	7	–	1
Jacksonville State		–		0	–	7	–	1

The 1931 Jacksonville State Eagle Owls football team represented Jacksonville State Teachers College (now known as Jacksonville State University) as an independent during the 1931 college football season. Led by first-year head coach T. B. Shotts, the Eagle Owls compiled an overall record of 0–7–1.

== Schedule ==
Date	Opponent	Site	Result	Source
September 19	at Sewanee	Hardee Field; Sewanee, TN	L 0–18	
October 3	Troy State	Daguette Field; Jacksonville, AL (rivalry)	L 6–24	
October 10	at Rollins	Tinker Field; Orlando, FL	L 14–37	
October 12	at Norman Park Junior College	Moultrie, GA	T 6–6	
October 24	Birmingham–Southern	Fair Park; Anniston, AL	L 0–40	
November 7	Piedmont	Daguette Field; Jacksonville, AL	L 7–12	
November 21	at Tennessee Wesleyan	Athens, TN	L 6–21	
December 11	at Miami (FL)	Moore Park; Miami, FL	L 13–14	
