= 1931 Roanoke Maroons football team =

American college football season

1931 Roanoke Maroons football
- Conference: Virginia Conference
- Record: 5–4 (2–3 Virginia)
- Head coach: Gordon C. White (2nd season)
- Home stadium: College Field

1931 Virginia Conference football standings
	Conf.					Overall
Team	W		L		T	W		L		T
Randolph–Macon $	5	–	1	–	0	7	–	1	–	1
William & Mary	4	–	1	–	0	5	–	2	–	2
Richmond	3	–	2	–	0	4	–	5	–	0
Roanoke	2	–	3	–	0	5	–	4	–	0
Emory and Henry	2	–	3	–	0	6	–	5	–	0
Lynchburg	2	–	3	–	0	4	–	6	–	0
Hampden–Sydney	2	–	3	–	0	3	–	6	–	0
Bridgewater	0	–	4	–	0	0	–	5	–	0
$ – Conference champion

The 1931 Roanoke Maroons football team represented Roanoke College as a member of the Virginia Conference during the 1931 college football season. Led by second-year head coach Gordon C. White, the Maroons compiled an overall record of 5–4, with a mark of 2–3 in conference play, and finished tied for fourth in the Virginia Conference.

== Schedule ==
Date	Opponent	Site	Result	Source
September 19	at Virginia*	Lambeth Field; Charlottesville, VA	L 0–18	
September 26	Elon*	College Field; Salem, VA	W 27–9	
October 3	Transylvania*	College Field; Salem, VA	W 33–19	
October 10	Guilford*	College Field; Salem, VA	W 6–0	
October 24	at Hampden–Sydney	Hampden-Sydney, VA	W 6–0	
October 31	at Richmond	City Stadium; Richmond, VA	L 2–7	
November 7	at William & Mary	Cary Field; Williamsburg, VA	L 6–13	
November 14	Randolph–Macon	College Field; Salem, VA	L 18–19	
November 21	Emory and Henry	College Field; Salem, VA	W 7–6	
*Non-conference game
