= 1931 South Georgia Teachers Blue Tide football team =

American college football season

1931 South Georgia Teachers Blue Tide football
- Conference: Independent
- Record: 2–6
- Head coach: Crook Smith (3rd season)

1931 Southern college football independents records
	Conf.			Overall
Team	W	L	T	W		L		T
Catholic University		–		8	–	1	–	0
Texas Mines		–		7	–	1	–	0
Delaware		–		5	–	1	–	2
William & Mary Norfolk		–		1	–	0	–	1
Furman		–		5	–	2	–	2
George Washington		–		5	–	2	–	2
Texas Tech		–		6	–	3	–	0
Troy State		–		6	–	3	–	0
Middle Tennessee State Teachers		–		6	–	4	–	0
Navy		–		5	–	5	–	1
Wake Forest		–		4	–	4	–	0
Western Carolina		–		4	–	4	–	0
Davidson		–		4	–	4	–	2
Western Maryland		–		4	–	4	–	2
Delaware State		–		2	–	2	–	1
Georgetown		–		4	–	5	–	1
Richmond		–		4	–	5	–	0
West Virginia		–		4	–	6	–	0
Oglethorpe		–		3	–	6	–	0
South Georgia Teachers		–		2	–	6	–	0
Jefferson (TX)		–		1	–	7	–	1
Jacksonville State		–		0	–	7	–	1

The 1931 South Georgia Teachers Blue Tide football team represented the South Georgia Teachers College—now known as Georgia Southern University—during the 1931 college football season. The team was led by Crook Smith in his third year as head coach.

== Schedule ==
Date	Time	Opponent	Site	Result	Source
October 2		at Norman Junior College	Norman Park, GA	L 0–7	
		Bowdon College	Statesboro, GA	L 7–24	
October 16	3:30 p.m.	Middle Georgia	Statesboro, GA	L 0–7	
October 24		at Parris Island Marines	Lee Field; Parris Island, SC	L 0–19	
		Millen Athletic Club	Statesboro, GA	W 67–0	
October 31		at Piedmont	Demorest, GA	L 0–16	
November 11		at Newberry	Savannah, GA	L 13–19	
November 26		at Brewton–Parker	Mount Vernon, GA	W 7–0	
All times are in Eastern time
