= 1931 Northern Illinois State Evansmen football team =

American college football season

1931 Northern Illinois State Evansmen football
- Conference: Illinois Intercollegiate Athletic Conference
- Record: 5–3 (4–2 IIAC)
- Head coach: Chick Evans (3rd season)
- Captain: Vernon Sutfin
- Home stadium: Glidden Field

1931 Illinois Intercollegiate Athletic Conference football standings
	Conf.					Overall
Team	W		L		T	W		L		T
Monmouth (IL) $	5	–	0	–	1	9	–	0	–	1
Millikin	4	–	1	–	0	6	–	3	–	0
Bradley	4	–	1	–	0	5	–	3	–	0
Augustana (IL)	3	–	1	–	2	5	–	2	–	2
St. Viator	5	–	2	–	0	5	–	2	–	0
Southern Illinois	4	–	2	–	0	7	–	2	–	0
North Central	4	–	2	–	0	5	–	2	–	0
Northern Illinois State	4	–	2	–	0	5	–	3	–	0
Carthage	3	–	3	–	1	4	–	4	–	1
Elmhurst	3	–	3	–	0	4	–	4	–	0
Knox (IL)	2	–	2	–	1	3	–	5	–	1
Illinois Wesleyan	3	–	3	–	0	3	–	5	–	0
McKendree	2	–	3	–	1	4	–	4	–	1
Eastern Illinois	2	–	3	–	0	3	–	4	–	0
Mount Morris	1	–	2	–	1	4	–	4	–	1
Eureka	2	–	4	–	1	3	–	4	–	1
Shurtleff	2	–	4	–	1	3	–	4	–	1
Western Illinois	2	–	4	–	0	2	–	6	–	0
Illinois College	1	–	4	–	2	2	–	5	–	2
Illinois State Normal	1	–	6	–	1	1	–	6	–	1
Lake Forest	0	–	2	–	2	0	–	2	–	4
Wheaton (IL)	0	–	3	–	0	3	–	5	–	0
$ – Conference champion

The 1931 Northern Illinois State Evansmen football team represented Northern Illinois State Teachers College—now known as Northern Illinois University—as a member of the Illinois Intercollegiate Athletic Conference (IIAC) during the 1930 college football season. Led by third-year head coach Chick Evans, the Evansmen compiled an overall record of 5–3 with a mark of 4–2 in conference play, tying for sixth place in the IIAC. The team played home games at the 5,500-seat Glidden Field, located on the east end of campus, in DeKalb, Illinois.

== Schedule ==
Date	Opponent	Site	Result
September 26	at Whitewater State*	Whitewater, WI	L 0–25
October 3	at Illinois State	Normal, IL	W 12–0
October 10	Milwaukee*	Glidden Field; DeKalb, IL	W 19–2
October 17	Illinois College	Glidden Field; DeKalb, IL	W 7–6
October 31	St. Viator	Glidden Field; DeKalb, IL	W 6–0
November 7	at North Central	Naperville, IL	L 6–19
November 14	Wheaton (IL)	Glidden Field; DeKalb, IL	W 20–0
November 21	at Southern Illinois	Carbondale, IL	L 6–7
*Non-conference game
