= Leon Brogden =

American sports coach (1910–2000)

Leon Lafayette Brogden Sr.
- Born: August 26, 1910; Wilmington, North Carolina, U.S.
- Died: October 1, 2000 (aged 90); Wilmington, North Carolina, U.S.

Leon Lafayette Brogden Sr. (August 26, 1910 – October 1, 2000) was an American high school basketball, football and baseball coach in Edenton, Wilson and Wilmington, North Carolina. His most famous products were two quarterbacks: Roman Gabriel, who spent 16 seasons in the NFL and was voted NFL MVP in 1969, and Sonny Jurgensen, who spent 18 seasons in the NFL and was inducted into the Pro Football Hall of Fame in 1983.

== Career ==
In 1935, Brogden began his coaching career in Edenton, North Carolina and later moved to Wilson, North Carolina for nine years and then to Wilmington, North Carolina in 1945, where he coached for 30 years.

While best remembered as a basketball coach, Brogden won 55 state championships across basketball, football and baseball.

In his book, Multiple Offenses and Defenses, North Carolina Tar Heels coach Dean Smith said that he and his coaches, while scouting, noticed Brogden's New Hanover basketball team using the 1–4 offensive set (one guard high and four players spanning the court at the foul line) and later incorporated that set into their own offenses at North Carolina.

== Recognition ==
Brogden was inducted into the Wake Forest University's Sports Hall of Fame in 1974, the North Carolina Sports Hall of Fame in 1970, the North Carolina High School Athletic Association Hall of Fame in 1987, and The Greater Wilmington Sports Hall of Fame in 2006.

== Legacy ==
The main gym of New Hanover High School, as well as the county's annual December basketball championship, are named after him.
