= Bill Burghardt =

American sports coach, athletics administrator, educator (1912–1981)

- Burghardt pictured in The Eagle 1940, NCC yearbook

Biographical details
- Born: February 4, 1912; Greenfield, Illinois, U.S.
- Died: August 8, 1981 (aged 69); Rockville, Maryland, U.S.

Playing career

Football
- 1930–1934: Eureka
- Position: Center

Coaching career (HC unless noted)

Football
- 1935: West Virginia State (assistant)
- 1937–1941: North Carolina College
- 1942: Lincoln (MO)

Basketball
- 1937–1940: North Carolina College

Administrative career (AD unless noted)
- 1937–1942: North Carolina College

Head coaching record
- Overall: 20–27–4 (football); 47–21 (basketball)
- Bowls: 0–1

William Franklin "Burgie" Burghardt (February 4, 1912 – August 8, 1981) was an American football and basketball coach, athletics administrator, and educator. He served as the head football coach at the North Carolina College for Negroes—now known as North Carolina Central University—in Durham, North Carolina from 1937 to 1941 and Lincoln University in Jefferson City, Missouri for one season, in 1942. Burghardt was also the head basketball coach at North Carolina Central from to 1937 to 1940. He attended Eureka College, where he played college football alongside future president of the United States Ronald Reagan.

== Family and early life ==
Burghardt was born and raised in the small town of Greenfield, Illinois, where his father and grandfather were barbers. He traced his family eight generations to an ancestor who fought in the American Revolution and was related to W. E. B. Du Bois.

== College career ==
Burghardt competed in football and track and field at Eureka College, where he was co-captain of the football team his senior year. At Eureka, he was on the football team with future president Ronald Reagan, who was two years ahead of him. In 1931, while playing a road trip against another small college in Illinois, a hotel refused to allow Burghardt and the team's other black player to stay. The coach was angry and decided that the whole team would sleep on the bus. Reagan, Burghardt later recalled, worried that this would cause the team's performance to suffer and thus humiliate the black players and harm their morale, and suggested instead that the coach tell the team that the hotel did not have enough rooms. Reagan paid for a taxi for Burghardt and their teammate to Dixon, Illinois, to stay with his parents, Jack and Nelle Reagan, who warmly welcomed them.

In Reagan's 1986 autobiography, Where's the Rest of Me?, he told a story about a racist player on an opposing team who was "filled with hatred and prejudice" and "played dirty" while targeting Burghardt. Though Burghardt was injured, he refused to play dirty and astounded the other team with his strength and skill. At the end of the game, the defeated player turned around to shake Burghardt's hand, telling him he was the greatest human being he had ever met. On Martin Luther King Jr. Day in 1986, President Reagan shared the same story at a school in Washington, D.C. Reagan and Burghardt remained friends, many decades later.

== Coaching career and later life ==
in 1935, Burghardt was an assistant coach at West Virginia State College–now known as West Virginia State University. In 1937, he earned a master's degree from the University of Iowa. Later that year, he was hired as athletic director and coach at North Carolina College for Negroes—now known as North Carolina Central University—in Durham, North Carolina. Burghardt served as head coach in football and basketball at North Carolina College. He led his basketball team to a Colored Intercollegiate Athletic Association (CIAA) championship in 1941.

Burghardt resigned from his post at North Carolina Central in May 1942 to become the head football coach at Lincoln University in Jefferson City, Missouri. In 1950, he was serving as an assistant professor in the department of healthy, physical education, and safety at West Virginia State. In February 1950, he earned a Doctor of Education degree from New York University (NYU). That fall, he was appointed as the head of the department of health and physical education at Morgan State College—now known as Morgan State University—in Baltimore.

== Honors and death ==
In 1970, Burghardt was inducted into the Eureka College Athletic Hall of Fame. He died on August 8, 1981, of complications from lung surgery.

== Head coaching record ==
=== Football ===
Year	Team	Overall	Conference	Standing	Bowl/playoffs
North Carolina College Eagles (Colored Intercollegiate Athletic Association) (1937–1941)
1937	North Carolina College	3–4–1	2–4–1	T–8th	
1938	North Carolina College	2–5–1	2–4–1	9th	
1939	North Carolina College	5–4	4–3	5th	
1940	North Carolina College	5–2–1	4–2	6th	
1941	North Carolina College	3–6–1 (Note: North Carolina College finished the 1941 season 8–1–1 overall and 6–0–1 in conference play, which was the best record in the Colored Intercollegiate Athletic Association. In December 1941, the CIAA ruled that North Carolina College had to forfeit five conference victories due to an ineligible player.)	1–5–1	7th	L Peach Blossom Classic
North Carolina College:		18–21–4	13–18–3		
Lincoln Blue Tigers (Midwest Athletic Association) (1942)
1942	Lincoln	2–6			
Lincoln:		2–6			
Total:		20–27–4			
