= 1931 Furman Purple Hurricane football team =

American college football season

1931 Furman Purple Hurricane football
- Conference: Independent
- Record: 5–2–2
- Head coach: T. B. Amis (4th season)
- Captain: Tom Carson
- Home stadium: Manly Field

1931 Southern college football independents records
	Conf.			Overall
Team	W	L	T	W		L		T
Catholic University		–		8	–	1	–	0
Texas Mines		–		7	–	1	–	0
Delaware		–		5	–	1	–	2
William & Mary Norfolk		–		1	–	0	–	1
Furman		–		5	–	2	–	2
George Washington		–		5	–	2	–	2
Texas Tech		–		6	–	3	–	0
Troy State		–		6	–	3	–	0
Middle Tennessee State Teachers		–		6	–	4	–	0
Navy		–		5	–	5	–	1
Wake Forest		–		4	–	4	–	0
Western Carolina		–		4	–	4	–	0
Davidson		–		4	–	4	–	2
Western Maryland		–		4	–	4	–	2
Delaware State		–		2	–	2	–	1
Georgetown		–		4	–	5	–	1
Richmond		–		4	–	5	–	0
West Virginia		–		4	–	6	–	0
Oglethorpe		–		3	–	6	–	0
South Georgia Teachers		–		2	–	6	–	0
Jefferson (TX)		–		1	–	7	–	1
Jacksonville State		–		0	–	7	–	1

The 1931 Furman Purple Hurricane football team represented Furman University as an independent during the 1931 college football season. Led by fourth-year head coach T. B. Amis, the Purple Hurricane compiled a record of 5–2–2.

== Schedule ==
Date	Opponent	Site	Result	Source
September 24	Newberry	Manly Field; Greenville, SC	W 26–0	
October 3	vs. Wake Forest	Gastonia High School Field; Gastonia, NC	W 26–0	
October 9	Erskine	Manly Field; Greenville, SC	T 0–0	
October 17	Richmond	Manly Field; Greenville, SC	W 34–6	
October 24	at Oglethorpe	Hermance Stadium; North Atlanta, GA	L 0–3	
October 31	Wofford	Manly Field; Greenville, SC (rivalry)	W 20–0	
November 7	at South Carolina*	Melton Field; Columbia, SC	L 0–27	
November 14	at The Citadel	Johnson Hagood Stadium; Charleston, SC (rivalry)	W 33–7	
November 26	Clemson	Manly Field; Greenville, SC	T 0–0	
*Non-conference game
