= 1931 college football season =

American college football season

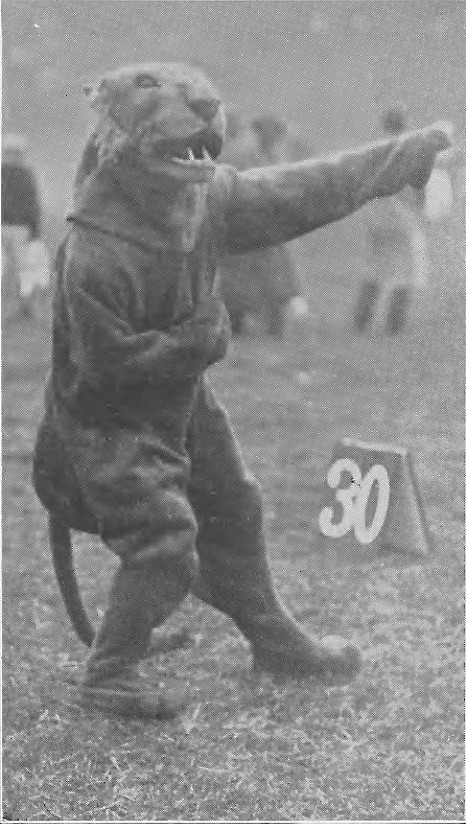
- The Pitt Panther mascot in 1931
- Number of bowls: 1
- Bowl games: January 1, 1932
- Champion(s): USC (Note: per Boand System, Dickinson System (received Knute Rockne Memorial Trophy), Dunkel System, Houlgate System, Williamson System, Erskine Trophy poll, Berryman QPRS, Billingsley Report, College Football Researchers Association, Helms Athletic Foundation, National Championship Foundation, Poling System, Sagarin Ratings Elo chess method, Sagarin Ratings Predictor method); Pittsburgh (Note: co-champion (alongside Pittsburgh) per Parke H. Davis); Purdue (not claimed) (Note: co-champion (alongside Pittsburgh) per Parke H. Davis)

The 1931 college football season saw the USC Trojans win the Knute Rockne Memorial Trophy as national champion under the Dickinson System, as well as the No. 1 position from each of the other three contemporary major selectors (Boand, Dunkel, and Houlgate Systems). Rockne, who had coached Notre Dame to a championship in 1930, had been killed in a plane crash on March 31, 1931. For the first time, the champion under the Dickinson System also played in a postseason game. The 1932 Rose Bowl, promoted as a national championship game between the best teams of East and West, matched USC and Tulane, No. 1 and No. 2 in the Dickinson ratings. USC won, 21–12, and was awarded the Albert Russel Erskine Trophy.

Two years later, historian Parke H. Davis selected Pittsburgh and Purdue (No. 9 and No. 10 in the Dickinson ratings) as "National Champion Foot Ball Teams" for 1931; he was the only NCAA-designated "major selector" to choose either team. Pittsburgh claims a 1931 national championship on this basis, while Purdue does not.

== Conference and program changes ==
=== New conferences ===
- Four conferences began play in 1931:
  - Border Conference – conference active through the 1962 season
  - Dixie Conference – conference active through the 1941 season; (the first of three conferences to share this name)
  - Lone Star Conference – an active NCAA Division II conference
  - North Dakota College Athletic Conference – an NAIA conference active through the 1999 season
- One conference played its final season in 1931:
  - Texas Intercollegiate Athletic Association – active since the 1909 season

=== Membership changes ===
School	1930 Conference	1931 Conference
Arizona Wildcats	Independent	Border
Arizona State Teachers'–Flagstaff Lumberjacks	Independent	Border
Arizona State Teachers'–Tempe Sun Devils	Independent	Border
Birmingham–Southern Panthers	SIAA	SIAA/Dixie
Centre Praying Colonels	SIAA	SIAA/Dixie
Chattanooga Mocs	SIAA	SIAA/Dixie
Howard Bulldogs	SIAA	SIAA/Dixie
Loyola Ramblers	Independent	Dropped Program
Mercer Bears	SIAA	SIAA/Dixie
New Mexico Lobos	Independent	Border
New Mexico A&M Aggies	Independent	Border
Southwestern Lynx	SIAA	SIAA/Dixie
Spring Hill Badgers	SIAA	SIAA/Dixie

=== Program changes ===
- Oregon State Agricultural College (Oregon State) Aggies officially changed their nickname to the now-eponymous Beavers.

== September ==
September 26 The season started with an upset. St. Mary's College, a relatively small school in San Francisco, defeated USC 13–7. Tulane beat Ole Miss, 31–0 and Tennessee beat Maryville 33–0, while Pittsburgh beat Miami University, 61–0.

== October ==
October 3 St. Mary's won again, at California, 14–0, and USC won its first game of the season, beating Oregon State 30–0. Tennessee beat Clemson 44–0 and Tulane defeated Texas A&M 7–0. Northwestern beat Nebraska 19–7. Purdue opened its season for the home crowd with a doubleheader, beating Ohio's Western Reserve 28–0, followed by a 19–0 win over Iowa's Coe College

Pittsburgh won at Iowa, 20–0 Georgia beat Virginia Tech 40–0 Harvard defeated Bates College, 28–0 and Yale beat Maine, 19–0 Notre Dame won at Indiana 25–0

October 10 In Chicago, a crowd of 75,000 turned out at Soldier Field to watch Northwestern and Notre Dame played to a 0–0 tie in a driving rain. Tennessee defeated Ole Miss 38–0. USC beat Washington State 38–6. Harvard beat New Hampshire, 39–0. In New Haven, the Georgia Bulldogs handed the Yale Bulldogs their first defeat, 26–7. Purdue beat Illinois 7–0 Pittsburgh beat West Virginia 34–0. Tulane defeated Spring Hill College 40–0 and St. Mary's beat the West Coast Army team, 21–7

October 17 Tulane and Vanderbilt, both 3–0–0, met at Nashville, with Tulane winning 19–0 Tennessee and Alabama, both 3–0–0, met at Knoxville, with UT winning 25–0. USC defeated visiting Oregon 53–0. Northwestern beat visiting UCLA 19–0 Georgia won at North Carolina, 32–7. Yale beat Chicago 27–0 and Harvard got past Army 14–13. Purdue lost at Wisconsin 21–14. Pittsburgh defeated Western Reserve, 32–0. Notre Dame defeated Drake 63–0. St. Mary's beat the University of San Francisco, 14–6. Neither SMC or USF play college football anymore.

October 24 Notre Dame (3–0–0) and Pittsburgh (4–0–0) met at South Bend, with Notre Dame winning 25–12. Tulane beat Georgia Tech 33–0; Tulane had outscored its five opponents 130–0. Tennessee won at North Carolina, 7–0; it had outscored its five foes 147–0. Georgia beat Vanderbilt 9–0. Harvard beat visiting Texas, 35–7 and Yale and Army played to a 6–6 tie, while in Pittsburgh, Purdue defeated Carnegie Tech 13–6. Northwestern defeated Ohio State in Columbus, 10–0. St. Mary's beat visiting Gonzaga University, 13–7. USC won at California 6–0

October 31 Tulane beat Mississippi State, but not without surrendering its first points, in a 59–7 win; likewise, Tennessee beat Duke, but was scored upon for the first time, in its 25–2 win Georgia won at Florida, 33–6. Northwestern beat visiting Illinois 32–6 and Purdue won at Chicago 14–6. Harvard beat Virginia 19–0 and Yale and Dartmouth played to a 33–33 tie. Pittsburgh won at Penn State, 41–6 Notre Dame defeated Carnegie Tech 19–0. Surprising St. Mary's extended its record to 6–0–0 with a 21–14 win over Santa Clara.

== November ==
November 7 USC (4–1–0) and Stanford (5–0–1) met at Los Angeles, and USC won 19–0. In Montgomery, Alabama, Tulane shut out Auburn 27–0. Tennessee beat visiting Carson-Newman, 31–0. Northwestern beat Minnesota, 32–14. Purdue beat Centenary College 49–6. Before a crowd of 65,000 at Yankee Stadium, Georgia stayed unbeaten as it defeated New York University 7–6, with the aid of a 97–yard kickoff return by Buster Mott in the third quarter. Harvard beat Dartmouth 7–6 and Yale beat St. John's College of Maryland, 52–0. Pittsburgh beat Carnegie Tech 14–6. Notre Dame beat Pennsylvania 49–0. St. Mary's suffered its first defeat, to the visiting Olympic Club, 10–0

November 11 In an Armistice Day game at Los Angeles, UCLA handed St. Mary's its second straight loss, 12–0

November 14 Tulane (7–0–0) and Georgia (6–0–0) faced off in Athens before a crowd of 36,000 for the rights to best in the South. The Green Wave rolled over Georgia's Bulldogs 20–7. Tennessee defeated Vanderbilt 21–7. USC beat visiting Montana 69–0. Harvard defeated Holy Cross 7–0. Purdue defeated Iowa 22–0 and Northwestern edged Indiana 7–6. Pittsburgh beat visiting Army 26–0. In Baltimore, Notre Dame beat Navy 20–0

November 21 Notre Dame (6–0–1) had not lost a football game in almost three years, its last defeat having been to the USC Trojans on 27–14 on December 1, 1928. A crowd of 52,000 turned out as (5–1–0) USC came to the Notre Dame campus in South Bend for the first time ever. The Trojans trailed 14–0 going into the fourth quarter, and was trailing 14–13 in the final minutes after Johnny Baker's extra point attempt had been blocked. In the final minute, Baker kicked a 34–yard field goal for a 16–14 win, Notre Dame's first loss in 27 starts. Tulane beat Sewanee 40–0. Northwestern won at Iowa 9–0, and Purdue won at Indiana, 19–0. In Columbus, Ga., Georgia beat Auburn 12–6. Yale (3–1–2) hosted Harvard (7–0–0) and won 3–0

November 26 On Thanksgiving Day, Pitt and Nebraska, both 7–1–0, met in Pittsburgh, with the home team winning 40–0. Tennessee and Kentucky played to a 6–6 tie in Lexington. St. Mary's defeated Oregon 16–0.

November 28 In Yankee Stadium, a crowd of 80,000 turned out in spite of a snowstorm, and watched as Notre Dame was beaten by Army, 12–0, for its second consecutive defeat after 26 games without a loss. Meanwhile, 40,000 watched in Chicago as Northwestern (7–0–1) and Purdue (8–1–0) met in a "post-season charity game" on a frozen field in Chicago, with the Boilermakers handing the Wildcats their first defeat, 7–0.

Yale beat Princeton 51–14. Tulane defeated LSU 34–7 and Georgia defeated Georgia Tech 35–6

== December ==
December 5 Tulane beat Washington State 28–14 to close at 11–0–0, unbeaten and untied, while Tennessee played NYU at Yankee Stadium, winning 13–0 to finish at 8–0–1. USC defeated Washington 44–7. St. Mary's closed its season with a 7–2 win over Southern Methodist (SMU).

December 12 USC and Georgia, both 8–1–0, met in Los Angeles, and the visiting Bulldogs were crushed 60–0

== 1932 Rose Bowl ==
For the first time, the Rose Bowl matchup included the No. 1 ranked team under the Dickinson ratings. That team, USC, was matched against No. 2 ranked Tulane. A crowd of 83,000 turned out in Pasadena, a Rose Bowl record. Though Tulane had outgained USC in total yards (378 vs. 233) and first downs (18 vs. 11), the USC Trojans made the most of their three scoring opportunities. In the third quarter, Erny Pinckert ran 28 yards for a touchdown, then, after the Trojans recovered a Tulane fumble, scored again. USC went up 21–0 before Tulane fought back with two touchdowns, and only a tough Trojan defense held the Green Wave from scoring more. The final result was USC 21, Tulane 12.

== Conference standings ==
=== Major conference standings ===
1931 Big Six Conference football standings
	Conf.					Overall
Team	W		L		T	W		L		T
Nebraska $	5	–	0	–	0	8	–	2	–	0
Iowa State	3	–	1	–	0	5	–	3	–	0
Kansas State	3	–	2	–	0	8	–	2	–	0
Kansas	1	–	3	–	0	5	–	5	–	0
Missouri	1	–	4	–	0	2	–	8	–	0
Oklahoma	1	–	4	–	0	4	–	7	–	1
$ – Conference champion

1931 Big Ten Conference football standings
	Conf.					Overall
Team	W		L		T	W		L		T
No. 10 Purdue +	5	–	1	–	0	9	–	1	–	0
Michigan +	5	–	1	–	0	8	–	1	–	1
No. 4 Northwestern +	5	–	1	–	0	7	–	1	–	1
Ohio State	4	–	2	–	0	6	–	3	–	0
Minnesota	3	–	2	–	0	7	–	3	–	0
Wisconsin	3	–	3	–	0	5	–	4	–	1
Indiana	1	–	4	–	1	2	–	5	–	1
Chicago	1	–	4	–	0	2	–	6	–	1
Iowa	0	–	3	–	1	1	–	6	–	1
Illinois	0	–	6	–	0	2	–	6	–	0
+ – Conference co-champions; Rankings from Dickinson System

1931 Border Conference football standings
	Conf.					Overall
Team	W		L		T	W		L		T
Arizona State $	3	–	0	–	0	6	–	2	–	0
New Mexico	1	–	1	–	1	3	–	3	–	1
Arizona	1	–	1	–	1	3	–	5	–	1
New Mexico A&M	1	–	2	–	0	6	–	4	–	0
Arizona State–Flagstaff	1	–	3	–	0	3	–	5	–	0
$ – Conference champion; Arizona State and Arizona State–Flagstaff played twice, but only the first meeting counted in the conference standings.

1931 Pacific Coast Conference football standings
	Conf.					Overall
Team	W		L		T	W		L		T
No. 1 USC $	7	–	0	–	0	10	–	1	–	0
California	4	–	1	–	0	8	–	2	–	0
Oregon	3	–	1	–	1	6	–	2	–	2
Washington State	4	–	3	–	0	6	–	4	–	0
Washington	3	–	3	–	1	5	–	3	–	1
Stanford	2	–	2	–	1	7	–	2	–	2
Oregon State	1	–	3	–	1	6	–	3	–	1
Idaho	1	–	4	–	0	3	–	4	–	0
UCLA	0	–	3	–	0	3	–	4	–	1
Montana	0	–	5	–	0	1	–	6	–	0
$ – Conference champion; Rankings from Dickinson System

1931 Rocky Mountain Conference football standings
	Conf.					Overall
Team	W		L		T	W		L		T
Utah $	6	–	0	–	0	7	–	2	–	0
Utah State	5	–	2	–	0	6	–	2	–	0
Colorado Agricultural	5	–	2	–	0	5	–	4	–	0
Colorado	3	–	2	–	0	5	–	3	–	0
Wyoming	3	–	2	–	0	6	–	4	–	0
Colorado College	4	–	3	–	0	4	–	4	–	0
BYU	2	–	3	–	0	4	–	4	–	0
Denver	3	–	5	–	0	4	–	6	–	0
Colorado Teachers	2	–	4	–	1	2	–	4	–	1
Western State (CO)	1	–	5	–	0	1	–	6	–	0
Montana State	0	–	2	–	0	1	–	5	–	1
Colorado Mines	0	–	4	–	1	1	–	5	–	1
$ – Conference champion

1931 Southern Conference football standings
	Conf.					Overall
Team	W		L		T	W		L		T
No. 2 Tulane $	8	–	0	–	0	11	–	1	–	0
No. 3 Tennessee	6	–	0	–	1	9	–	0	–	1
Alabama	7	–	1	–	0	9	–	1	–	0
No. 6 Georgia	6	–	1	–	0	8	–	2	–	0
Maryland	4	–	1	–	1	8	–	1	–	1
Kentucky	4	–	2	–	2	5	–	2	–	2
LSU	3	–	2	–	0	5	–	4	–	0
South Carolina	3	–	3	–	1	5	–	4	–	1
Duke	3	–	3	–	1	5	–	3	–	2
Auburn	3	–	3	–	0	5	–	3	–	0
Sewanee	3	–	3	–	0	6	–	3	–	1
Vanderbilt	3	–	4	–	0	5	–	4	–	0
North Carolina	2	–	3	–	3	4	–	3	–	3
Washington and Lee	2	–	3	–	0	4	–	5	–	1
Florida	2	–	4	–	2	2	–	6	–	2
Georgia Tech	2	–	4	–	1	2	–	7	–	1
VMI	2	–	4	–	0	3	–	6	–	1
NC State	2	–	4	–	0	3	–	6	–	0
VPI	1	–	4	–	1	3	–	4	–	2
Clemson	1	–	4	–	0	1	–	6	–	2
Ole Miss	1	–	5	–	0	2	–	6	–	1
Virginia	0	–	5	–	1	2	–	6	–	1
Mississippi A&M	0	–	5	–	0	2	–	6	–	0
$ – Conference champion; Rankings from Dickinson System

1931 Southwest Conference football standings
	Conf.					Overall
Team	W		L		T	W		L		T
SMU $	5	–	0	–	1	9	–	1	–	1
TCU	4	–	1	–	1	8	–	2	–	1
Texas A&M	3	–	2	–	0	7	–	3	–	0
Rice	3	–	3	–	0	6	–	4	–	0
Texas	2	–	3	–	0	6	–	4	–	0
Baylor	1	–	5	–	0	3	–	6	–	0
Arkansas	0	–	4	–	0	3	–	5	–	1
$ – Conference champion

=== Independents ===
1931 Eastern college football independents records
	Conf.			Overall
Team	W	L	T	W		L		T
Bucknell		–		6	–	0	–	3
Colgate		–		8	–	1	–	0
No. 9 Pittsburgh		–		8	–	1	–	0
Cornell		–		7	–	1	–	0
Drexel		–		7	–	1	–	0
No. 7 Harvard		–		7	–	1	–	0
Temple		–		8	–	1	–	1
Columbia		–		7	–	1	–	1
Massachusetts State		–		7	–	1	–	1
Syracuse		–		7	–	1	–	1
Fordham		–		6	–	1	–	2
No. 8 Yale		–		5	–	1	–	2
Army		–		8	–	2	–	1
Franklin & Marshall		–		6	–	2	–	0
Manhattan		–		4	–	2	–	1
Brown		–		7	–	3	–	0
Providence		–		7	–	3	–	0
Penn		–		6	–	3	–	0
NYU		–		6	–	3	–	1
Boston College		–		6	–	4	–	0
Washington & Jefferson		–		6	–	4	–	0
Tufts		–		3	–	2	–	2
Villanova		–		4	–	3	–	2
La Salle		–		4	–	4	–	0
Duquesne		–		3	–	5	–	3
Carnegie Tech		–		3	–	5	–	1
St. John's		–		3	–	5	–	1
CCNY		–		2	–	5	–	1
Boston University		–		2	–	7	–	0
Penn State		–		2	–	8	–	0
Princeton		–		1	–	7	–	0
Vermont		–		1	–	8	–	0
Rankings from Dickinson System

1931 Midwestern college football independents records
	Conf.			Overall
Team	W	L	T	W		L		T
Wilberforce		–		8	–	0	–	0
Lincoln (MO)		–		5	–	0	–	1
Marquette		–		8	–	1	–	0
Saint Louis		–		8	–	1	–	0
Detroit		–		7	–	2	–	1
Western State Teachers		–		5	–	2	–	0
No. 11 Notre Dame		–		6	–	2	–	1
DePaul		–		6	–	3	–	0
Michigan State		–		5	–	3	–	1
Haskell		–		6	–	4	–	0
Michigan Tech		–		3	–	2	–	0
Michigan State Normal		–		3	–	2	–	1
Central State (MI)		–		4	–	3	–	0
John Carroll		–		4	–	4	–	2
Wittenberg		–		3	–	3	–	3
Kent State		–		3	–	4	–	0
Rankings from Dickinson System

1931 Southern college football independents records
	Conf.			Overall
Team	W	L	T	W		L		T
Catholic University		–		8	–	1	–	0
Texas Mines		–		7	–	1	–	0
Delaware		–		5	–	1	–	2
William & Mary Norfolk		–		1	–	0	–	1
Furman		–		5	–	2	–	2
George Washington		–		5	–	2	–	2
Texas Tech		–		6	–	3	–	0
Troy State		–		6	–	3	–	0
Middle Tennessee State Teachers		–		6	–	4	–	0
Navy		–		5	–	5	–	1
Wake Forest		–		4	–	4	–	0
Western Carolina		–		4	–	4	–	0
Davidson		–		4	–	4	–	2
Western Maryland		–		4	–	4	–	2
Delaware State		–		2	–	2	–	1
Georgetown		–		4	–	5	–	1
Richmond		–		4	–	5	–	0
Tennessee State		–		2	–	3	–	0
West Virginia		–		4	–	6	–	0
Oglethorpe		–		3	–	6	–	0
South Georgia Teachers		–		2	–	6	–	0
Jefferson (TX)		–		1	–	7	–	1
Jacksonville State		–		0	–	7	–	1

1931 Western college football independents records
	Conf.			Overall
Team	W	L	T	W		L		T
Mount St. Charles		–		6	–	0	–	0
No. 5 Saint Mary's		–		8	–	2	–	0
Loyola (CA)		–		7	–	2	–	1
San Diego Marines		–		6	–	4	–	0
Hawaii		–		3	–	2	–	1
Santa Clara		–		5	–	4	–	1
San Francisco		–		4	–	4	–	2
San Francisco State		–		2	–	3	–	3
Gonzaga		–		3	–	4	–	0
Humboldt State		–		1	–	2	–	1
Columbia (OR)		–		2	–	5	–	0
Rankings from Dickinson System

=== Minor conferences ===
Conference	Champion(s)	Record
Big Four Conference	Oklahoma City	3–0
Central Intercollegiate Athletics Association	Hampton Institute	8–0–1
Central Intercollegiate Athletic Conference	Washburn; Wichita	5–1
Far Western Conference	No champion	—
Iowa Intercollegiate Athletic Conference	Simpson	6–0
Kansas Collegiate Athletic Conference	Kansas Wesleyan	2–0–2
Michigan Intercollegiate Athletic Association	Hillsdale	3–0–2
Michigan-Ontario Collegiate Conference	Adrian	4–0
Midwest Collegiate Athletic Conference	Carleton; Monmouth (IL); Ripon	2–0; 2–0; 3–0
Minnesota Intercollegiate Athletic Conference	Concordia–Moorhead	4–1
Missouri Intercollegiate Athletic Association	Northwest Missouri State Teacher	4–0
Nebraska College Athletic Conference	Nebraska Wesleyan	—
Nebraska Intercollegiate Athletic Association	State Normal and Teachers (NE)	—
North Central Intercollegiate Athletic Conference	North Dakota	3–0–2; 3–0–1
North Dakota College Athletic Conference	Minot State Teachers; State Normal and Industrial (ND)	4–0
Ohio Athletic Conference	Muskingum	4–0
Oklahoma Collegiate Athletic Conference	Central State Teachers	4–0–1
Pacific Northwest Conference	Whitman	3–1
South Dakota Intercollegiate Conference	Northern Normal and Industrial	3–0–1
Southern California Intercollegiate Athletic Conference	California Tech	5–1
Southwestern Athletic Conference	Prairie View A&M	5–0
Southern Intercollegiate Athletic Conference	Tuskegee	6–1
Texas Collegiate Athletic Conference	Hardin–Simmons; Howard Payne	4–1
Texas Intercollegiate Athletic Association	North Texas State Teachers	4–0
Tri-Normal League	Unknown	—
Wisconsin State Teachers College Conference	Milwaukee State Teachers	4–0

=== Minor conference standings ===
1931 Big Four Conference (Oklahoma) football standings
	Conf.					Overall
Team	W		L		T	W		L		T
Oklahoma City $	3	–	0	–	0	12	–	0	–	0
Tulsa	2	–	1	–	0	8	–	3	–	0
Oklahoma Baptist	1	–	2	–	0	3	–	6	–	0
Phillips	0	–	3	–	0	1	–	5	–	0
$ – Conference champion

1931 Big Four Conference (Wisconsin) football standings
	Conf.					Overall
Team	W		L		T	W		L		T
Ripon $	3	–	0	–	0	4	–	3	–	0
Beloit	2	–	1	–	0	4	–	2	–	1
Lawrence	1	–	2	–	0	2	–	4	–	0
Carroll (WI)	0	–	3	–	0	1	–	4	–	1
$ – Conference champion

1931 Buckeye Athletic Association football standings
	Conf.					Overall
Team	W		L		T	W		L		T
Ohio $	4	–	0	–	0	7	–	1	–	0
Wittenberg	1	–	0	–	0	8	–	0	–	1
Ohio Wesleyan	2	–	1	–	0	5	–	3	–	0
Cincinnati	2	–	1	–	0	5	–	4	–	0
Miami (OH)	1	–	4	–	0	4	–	5	–	0
Denison	0	–	4	–	0	0	–	6	–	2
$ – Conference champion

1931 Central Intercollegiate Conference football standings
	Conf.					Overall
Team	W		L		T	W		L		T
Washburn +	5	–	1	–	0	7	–	3	–	0
Wichita +	5	–	1	–	0	7	–	3	–	0
Emporia Teachers	4	–	2	–	0	4	–	4	–	0
Pittsburg State	3	–	3	–	0	4	–	5	–	0
Hays Teachers	1	–	4	–	1	3	–	5	–	1
Southwestern (KS)	1	–	4	–	1	3	–	5	–	1
College of Emporia	1	–	5	–	0	2	–	6	–	0
$ – Conference champion

1931 Colored Intercollegiate Athletic Association football standings
	Conf.					Overall
Team	W		L		T	W		L		T
Hampton $	6	–	0	–	1	7	–	0	–	1
Virginia State	6	–	1	–	1	8	–	1	–	1
Morgan	4	–	2	–	0	5	–	2	–	0
Lincoln (PA)	5	–	2	–	0	5	–	4	–	0
North Carolina College	5	–	3	–	0	5	–	3	–	1
Howard	2	–	5	–	0	2	–	5	–	0
North Carolina A&T	3	–	5	–	0	3	–	5	–	0
Saint Paul (VA)	3	–	5	–	0	3	–	5	–	0
Shaw	2	–	2	–	2	3	–	2	–	3
Virginia Union	3	–	3	–	1	4	–	4	–	1
Livingstone	0	–	3	–	2	0	–	5	–	3
Johnson C. Smith	0	–	6	–	0	0	–	6	–	0
Virginia Seminary	1	–	5	–	1	1	–	5	–	1
$ – Conference champion

1931 Dixie Conference football standings
	Conf.					Overall
Team	W		L		T	W		L		T
Chattanooga $	4	–	0	–	0	9	–	2	–	0
Southwestern (TN)	2	–	0	–	1	4	–	2	–	3
Howard (AL)	3	–	1	–	1	8	–	2	–	2
Centre	1	–	1	–	0	8	–	2	–	1
Mississippi College	1	–	1	–	0	5	–	4	–	0
Birmingham–Southern	2	–	3	–	0	5	–	4	–	0
Mercer	1	–	2	–	0	7	–	2	–	1
Millsaps	0	–	3	–	0	3	–	5	–	0
Spring Hill	0	–	3	–	0	3	–	6	–	0
$ – Conference champion

1931 Eastern Pennsylvania Collegiate Conference football standings
	Conf.					Overall
Team	W		L		T	W		L		T
Ursinus $	3	–	0	–	1	6	–	2	–	1
Franklin & Marshall	3	–	1	–	0	6	–	2	–	0
Gettysburg	1	–	1	–	2	2	–	4	–	2
Dickinson	1	–	2	–	1	4	–	2	–	2
Muhlenberg	0	–	4	–	0	2	–	8	–	0
$ – Conference champion

1931 Far Western Conference football standings
	Conf.					Overall
Team	W		L		T	W		L		T
Pacific (CA)	2	–	1	–	2	5	–	2	–	2
Cal Aggies	2	–	1	–	2	4	–	2	–	2
Chico State	2	–	1	–	1	3	–	4	–	1
Nevada	2	–	1	–	1	2	–	5	–	2
Fresno State	3	–	2	–	0	4	–	6	–	0
San Jose State	0	–	5	–	0	1	–	8	–	0
No champion was named for the 1931 season.

1931 Illinois Intercollegiate Athletic Conference football standings
	Conf.					Overall
Team	W		L		T	W		L		T
Monmouth (IL) $	5	–	0	–	1	9	–	0	–	1
Millikin	4	–	1	–	0	6	–	3	–	0
Bradley	4	–	1	–	0	5	–	3	–	0
Augustana (IL)	3	–	1	–	2	5	–	2	–	2
St. Viator	5	–	2	–	0	5	–	2	–	0
Southern Illinois	4	–	2	–	0	7	–	2	–	0
North Central	4	–	2	–	0	5	–	2	–	0
Northern Illinois State	4	–	2	–	0	5	–	3	–	0
Carthage	3	–	3	–	1	4	–	4	–	1
Elmhurst	3	–	3	–	0	4	–	4	–	0
Knox (IL)	2	–	2	–	1	3	–	5	–	1
Illinois Wesleyan	3	–	3	–	0	3	–	5	–	0
McKendree	2	–	3	–	1	4	–	4	–	1
Eastern Illinois	2	–	3	–	0	3	–	4	–	0
Mount Morris	1	–	2	–	1	4	–	4	–	1
Eureka	2	–	4	–	1	3	–	4	–	1
Shurtleff	2	–	4	–	1	3	–	4	–	1
Western Illinois	2	–	4	–	0	2	–	6	–	0
Illinois College	1	–	4	–	2	2	–	5	–	2
Illinois State Normal	1	–	6	–	1	1	–	6	–	1
Lake Forest	0	–	2	–	2	0	–	2	–	4
Wheaton (IL)	0	–	3	–	0	3	–	5	–	0
$ – Conference champion

1931 Indiana Intercollegiate Conference football standings
	Conf.					Overall
Team	W		L		T	W		L		T
Valparaiso +	4	–	0	–	0	8	–	1	–	0
DePauw +	4	–	0	–	0	7	–	1	–	0
Franklin (IN)	7	–	1	–	0	7	–	1	–	0
Rose Poly	5	–	2	–	0	6	–	2	–	0
Manchester	2	–	1	–	0	4	–	4	–	0
Butler	2	–	1	–	0	3	–	5	–	0
Indiana State	3	–	2	–	0	4	–	3	–	0
Evansville	3	–	3	–	0	3	–	5	–	0
Wabash	3	–	3	–	0	3	–	5	–	1
Oakland City	2	–	3	–	0	3	–	3	–	0
Central Normal	2	–	4	–	0	2	–	4	–	0
Earlham	2	–	4	–	0	2	–	5	–	0
Ball State	2	–	5	–	0	2	–	6	–	0
Hanover	0	–	6	–	1	1	–	7	–	1
Indiana Central	0	–	6	–	1	0	–	6	–	1
+ – Conference co-champions

1931 Iowa Conference football standings
	Conf.					Overall
Team	W		L		T	W		L		T
Simpson (IA) $	6	–	0	–	0	7	–	4	–	0
St. Ambrose	6	–	1	–	0	9	–	1	–	0
Iowa Wesleyan	3	–	1	–	1	7	–	1	–	1
Central (IA)	3	–	1	–	2	5	–	1	–	2
Luther	5	–	2	–	0	5	–	4	–	0
Upper Iowa	3	–	2	–	0	4	–	2	–	0
Columbia (IA)	3	–	3	–	0	4	–	3	–	1
Iowa State Teachers	2	–	2	–	0	3	–	5	–	0
Morningside	1	–	1	–	0	2	–	6	–	0
Penn (IA)	3	–	5	–	0	3	–	5	–	0
Western Union	0	–	3	–	0	1	–	6	–	0
Dubuque	0	–	4	–	0	0	–	7	–	0
Parsons	0	–	5	–	1	0	–	7	–	1
Buena Vista	0	–	5	–	0	1	–	7	–	1
$ – Conference champion

1931 Kansas Collegiate Athletic Conference football standings
	Conf.					Overall
Team	W		L		T	W		L		T
Kansas Wesleyan $	2	–	0	–	2	6	–	0	–	2
Ottawa	2	–	2	–	0	5	–	3	–	0
Bethany (KS)	1	–	1	–	2	2	–	4	–	3
Baker	1	–	2	–	1	2	–	5	–	2
McPherson	1	–	2	–	1	2	–	6	–	1
$ – Conference champion

1931 Michigan Intercollegiate Athletic Association football standings
	Conf.					Overall
Team	W		L		T	W		L		T
Hillsdale $	3	–	0	–	2	6	–	0	–	2
Alma	3	–	1	–	1	3	–	3	–	1
Olivet	2	–	2	–	0	5	–	3	–	0
Kalamazoo	2	–	3	–	0	5	–	4	–	0
Hope	1	–	3	–	1	3	–	4	–	1
Albion	1	–	3	–	0	3	–	4	–	0
$ – Conference champion

1931 Michigan-Ontario Collegiate Conference football standings
	Conf.					Overall
Team	W		L		T	W		L		T
Adrian $	4	–	0	–	0	5	–	4	–	0
Detroit Tech	2	–	1	–	1	3	–	3	–	1
General Motors Tech	2	–	2	–	0	2	–	5	–	2
Assumption (ON)	1	–	2	–	1	?	–	?	–	?
St. Mary's (MI)	0	–	4	–	0	1	–	6	–	0
$ – Conference champion

1931 Midwest Conference football standings
	Conf.					Overall
Team	W		L		T	W		L		T
Ripon +	3	–	0	–	0	4	–	3	–	0
Monmouth (IL) +	3	–	0	–	0	8	–	0	–	1
Carleton +	2	–	0	–	0	5	–	2	–	0
Cornell (IA)	2	–	2	–	0	2	–	7	–	0
Beloit	1	–	2	–	0	4	–	2	–	1
Knox	1	–	3	–	0	3	–	5	–	1
Coe	1	–	3	–	0	1	–	8	–	0
Lawrence	0	–	3	–	0	2	–	4	–	0
+ – Conference co-champions

1931 Minnesota Intercollegiate Athletic Conference football standings
	Conf.					Overall
Team	W		L		T	W		L		T
Concordia (MN) $	4	–	1	–	0	5	–	2	–	1
St. Olaf	3	–	1	–	0	6	–	2	–	0
St. Thomas (MN)	3	–	1	–	0	4	–	3	–	1
Saint John's (MN)	3	–	2	–	0	4	–	2	–	1
Macalester	2	–	2	–	1	4	–	2	–	1
Gustavus Adolphus	2	–	3	–	0	2	–	5	–	0
Hamline	1	–	3	–	1	2	–	5	–	1
Augsburg	0	–	5	–	0	0	–	5	–	0
$ – Conference champion

1931 Missouri College Athletic Union football standings
	Conf.					Overall
Team	W		L		T	W		L		T
Westminster (MO) $	4	–	0	–	1	8	–	0	–	1
Missouri Mines	2	–	0	–	0	5	–	3	–	0
Missouri Valley	2	–	1	–	1	5	–	3	–	1
Central (MO)	3	–	3	–	1	4	–	4	–	1
Tarkio	0	–	1	–	3	2	–	3	–	3
William Jewell	0	–	1	–	3	2	–	3	–	4
Culver–Stockton	0	–	1	–	1	2	–	5	–	1
Drury	0	–	4	–	2	1	–	5	–	2
$ – Conference champion

1931 Missouri Intercollegiate Athletic Association football standings
	Conf.					Overall
Team	W		L		T	W		L		T
Maryville (MO) $	4	–	0	–	0	9	–	0	–	0
Kirksville	2	–	1	–	1	6	–	1	–	1
Springfield (MO)	2	–	1	–	1	5	–	2	–	1
Warrensburg	1	–	3	–	0	3	–	8	–	0
Cape Girardeau	0	–	4	–	0	2	–	8	–	0
$ – Conference champion

1931 Middle Three Conference football standings
	Conf.					Overall
Team	W		L		T	W		L		T
Lafayette $	2	–	0	–	0	7	–	2	–	0
Rutgers	1	–	1	–	0	4	–	3	–	1
Lehigh	0	–	2	–	0	3	–	7	–	0
$ – Conference champion

1931 Missouri Valley Conference football standings
	Conf.					Overall
Team	W		L		T	W		L		T
Drake $	3	–	0	–	0	5	–	6	–	0
Oklahoma A&M	1	–	0	–	0	8	–	2	–	1
Creighton	2	–	2	–	0	4	–	5	–	0
Grinnell	1	–	2	–	0	5	–	3	–	0
Washington University	0	–	3	–	0	2	–	7	–	0
$ – Conference champion

1931 Nebraska College Athletic Conference football standings
	Conf.					Overall
Team	W		L		T	W		L		T
Nebraska Wesleyan $	4	–	0	–	1	4	–	3	–	1
Hastings	1	–	0	–	3	2	–	2	–	4
York (NE)	2	–	1	–	2	3	–	3	–	2
Cotner	2	–	3	–	0	3	–	4	–	0
Midland	1	–	2	–	2	1	–	5	–	2
Doane	0	–	4	–	0	1	–	6	–	1
$ – Conference champion

1931 Nebraska Intercollegiate Athletic Association football standings
	Conf.					Overall
Team	W		L		T	W		L		T
Wayne State $	3	–	0	–	1	7	–	0	–	1
Omaha	1	–	1	–	1	6	–	1	–	1
Kearney State	2	–	2	–	0	5	–	5	–	0
Peru State	2	–	2	–	0	4	–	4	–	1
Chadron State	0	–	3	–	0	3	–	4	–	0
$ – Conference champion

1931 New England Conference football standings
	Conf.					Overall
Team	W		L		T	W		L		T
New Hampshire +	2	–	0	–	0	7	–	2	–	0
Rhode Island State +	2	–	0	–	0	4	–	4	–	0
Maine	1	–	2	–	0	4	–	3	–	0
Connecticut	0	–	3	–	0	2	–	3	–	3
+ – Conference co-champions

1931 North Central Conference football standings
	Conf.					Overall
Team	W		L		T	W		L		T
North Dakota $	4	–	0	–	0	8	–	1	–	2
South Dakota State	2	–	2	–	0	6	–	3	–	0
North Dakota Agricultural	2	–	2	–	0	5	–	5	–	0
South Dakota	1	–	3	–	0	2	–	5	–	0
Morningside	1	–	3	–	0	2	–	6	–	0
$ – Conference champion

1931 North State Conference football standings
	Conf.					Overall
Team	W		L		T	W		L		T
Appalachian State $	3	–	0	–	0	9	–	2	–	2
Catawba	2	–	1	–	0	7	–	3	–	1
Guilford	2	–	1	–	0	5	–	6	–	0
Elon	2	–	1	–	0	3	–	5	–	0
Lenoir–Rhyne	1	–	4	–	0	3	–	7	–	0
High Point	1	–	4	–	0	2	–	7	–	0
$ – Conference champion

1931 Northwest Conference football standings
	Conf.					Overall
Team	W		L		T	W		L		T
Whitman $	3	–	1	–	0	4	–	5	–	0
Willamette	3	–	2	–	0	5	–	4	–	0
Pacific (OR)	3	–	2	–	0	5	–	2	–	0
College of Idaho	2	–	2	–	0	2	–	5	–	0
Puget Sound	2	–	3	–	0	6	–	3	–	0
Linfield	0	–	3	–	0	0	–	6	–	1
$ – Conference champion

1931 Northwest Ohio League football standings
	Conf.					Overall
Team	W		L		T	W		L		T
Defiance $	2	–	0	–	1	6	–	0	–	1
Bluffton	1	–	0	–	2	2	–	2	–	3
Bowling Green	0	–	1	–	2	3	–	1	–	4
Findlay	0	–	2	–	1	3	–	3	–	1
$ – Conference champion

1931 Ohio Athletic Conference football standings
	Conf.					Overall
Team	W		L		T	W		L		T
Muskingum $	4	–	0	–	0	8	–	0	–	0
Western Reserve	3	–	0	–	0	3	–	5	–	1
Baldwin–Wallace	4	–	0	–	1	5	–	0	–	3
Otterbein	5	–	1	–	0	5	–	3	–	0
Mount Union	4	–	1	–	0	7	–	2	–	1
Ohio Northern	3	–	1	–	0	6	–	2	–	0
Case	4	–	1	–	1	4	–	3	–	1
Xavier	1	–	0	–	1	4	–	3	–	1
Heidelberg	2	–	1	–	0	3	–	4	–	0
Dayton	0	–	0	–	1	5	–	3	–	2
Kenyon	3	–	3	–	0	4	–	3	–	0
Oberlin	2	–	3	–	0	3	–	4	–	1
Wooster	2	–	4	–	0	4	–	5	–	0
Ashland	2	–	6	–	0	2	–	6	–	0
Capital	1	–	4	–	0	1	–	5	–	1
Marietta	1	–	4	–	0	1	–	7	–	0
Akron	0	–	6	–	0	1	–	7	–	0
Hiram	0	–	6	–	0	0	–	8	–	0
$ – Conference champion

1931 Oklahoma Collegiate Conference football standings
	Conf.					Overall
Team	W		L		T	W		L		T
Central State Teachers $	4	–	0	–	1	6	–	2	–	1
SE Oklahoma State	4	–	1	–	0	5	–	2	–	1
East Central	2	–	2	–	1	6	–	3	–	1
SW Oklahoma State	1	–	2	–	2	4	–	2	–	2
NW Oklahoma State	1	–	2	–	2	3	–	2	–	3
Northeastern State	0	–	5	–	0	2	–	9	–	0
$ – Conference champion

1931 Smoky Mountain Conference football standings
	Conf.					Overall
Team	W		L		T	W		L		T
Maryville (TN) $	2	–	0	–	1	5	–	2	–	3
Carson–Newman	3	–	1	–	1	6	–	2	–	1
Tusculum	2	–	1	–	1	6	–	1	–	1
King	1	–	2	–	1	2	–	7	–	1
Lincoln Memorial	1	–	3	–	1	4	–	7	–	1
Milligan	0	–	1	–	3	2	–	2	–	4
East Tennessee State Teachers	0	–	1	–	2	1	–	4	–	2
$ – Conference champion

1931 South Dakota Intercollegiate Conference football standings
	Conf.					Overall
Team	W		L		T	W		L		T
Northern Normal $	3	–	0	–	1	4	–	2	–	2
Yankton	3	–	1	–	2	4	–	2	–	3
Southern Normal	5	–	2	–	0	5	–	4	–	0
Sioux Falls	2	–	2	–	1	3	–	3	–	1
Huron	1	–	1	–	4	1	–	2	–	4
Augustana (SD)	2	–	2	–	0	2	–	5	–	0
South Dakota Mines	2	–	3	–	0	2	–	5	–	0
Dakota Wesleyan	2	–	3	–	1	2	–	6	–	1
Spearfish	0	–	3	–	0	1	–	5	–	0
Eastern Normal	0	–	3	–	1	0	–	3	–	1
$ – Conference champion

1931 Southern California Conference football standings
	Conf.					Overall
Team	W		L		T	W		L		T
Caltech $	5	–	1	–	0	6	–	2	–	1
Whittier	4	–	1	–	0	6	–	3	–	0
Occidental	3	–	2	–	0	3	–	4	–	1
Redlands	3	–	3	–	1	4	–	3	–	1
San Diego State	2	–	2	–	1	5	–	3	–	2
Pomona	2	–	3	–	0	2	–	6	–	0
La Verne	1	–	3	–	0	4	–	3	–	1
Santa Barbara State	0	–	5	–	0	1	–	5	–	1
$ – Conference champion

1931 Southern Intercollegiate Athletic Association football standings
	Conf.					Overall
Team	W		L		T	W		L		T
Chattanooga $	8	–	0	–	0	9	–	2	–	0
Louisiana Tech	6	–	0	–	0	7	–	0	–	0
Centenary	3	–	0	–	0	5	–	5	–	0
Western Kentucky State Teachers	7	–	1	–	0	8	–	4	–	0
Centre	5	–	1	–	0	8	–	2	–	1
The Citadel	4	–	1	–	0	5	–	4	–	1
Howard (AL)	3	–	1	–	1	8	–	2	–	2
Mercer	6	–	2	–	0	7	–	2	–	1
Southwestern (TN)	3	–	1	–	1	4	–	2	–	3
Loyola (LA)	2	–	1	–	0	5	–	4	–	0
Georgetown (KY)	3	–	2	–	0	4	–	5	–	0
Birmingham–Southern	4	–	3	–	0	5	–	4	–	0
Mississippi College	4	–	3	–	0	5	–	4	–	0
Murray State	2	–	2	–	0	5	–	3	–	1
Union (TN)	4	–	4	–	0	5	–	4	–	0
Wofford	3	–	4	–	0	4	–	5	–	0
Miami (FL)	2	–	3	–	0	4	–	8	–	0
Spring Hill	2	–	3	–	0	3	–	6	–	0
Louisiana Normal	2	–	4	–	0	5	–	4	–	0
Millsaps	2	–	4	–	0	3	–	5	–	0
Eastern Kentucky State Teachers	1	–	2	–	0	2	–	5	–	1
Mississippi State Teachers	2	–	4	–	0	2	–	5	–	0
Middle Tennessee State Teachers	1	–	3	–	0	6	–	4	–	0
Presbyterian	1	–	4	–	1	2	–	5	–	2
Transylvania	1	–	4	–	0	2	–	7	–	0
SW Louisiana	1	–	4	–	0	1	–	6	–	1
Stetson	1	–	5	–	0	3	–	5	–	0
Erskine	1	–	5	–	1	2	–	6	–	3
Louisiana College	1	–	6	–	0	2	–	6	–	0
Rollins	0	–	1	–	0	6	–	1	–	0
Newberry	0	–	3	–	0	2	–	6	–	0
Louisville	0	–	5	–	0	0	–	8	–	0
$ – Conference champion

1931 Southern Intercollegiate Athletic Conference football standings
	Conf.					Overall
Team	W		L		T	W		L		T
Tuskegee $	6	–	1	–	0	10	–	2	–	0
Clark (GA)	5	–	1	–	0	9	–	1	–	0
Alabama State	4	–	1	–	0	8	–	3	–	0
Knoxville	3	–	2	–	0	4	–	3	–	1
Morris Brown	3	–	4	–	0	6	–	4	–	0
Fisk	1	–	2	–	0	2	–	6	–	0
Talladega	1	–	3	–	0	3	–	4	–	0
Morehouse	1	–	5	–	0	2	–	6	–	1
Edward Waters	0	–	1	–	0	6	–	2	–	1
Lane	0	–	1	–	0	3	–	3	–	0
Miles	0	–	1	–	0	?	–	?	–	?
Florida A&M	0	–	2	–	0	2	–	4	–	1
$ – Conference champion

1931 Southwestern Athletic Conference football standings
	Conf.					Overall
Team	W		L		T	W		L		T
Prairie View $	4	–	0	–	0	9	–	1	–	1
Wiley	3	–	1	–	0	6	–	3	–	1
Bishop	2	–	2	–	0	?	–	?	–	?
Samuel Huston	0	–	3	–	1	?	–	?	–	?
Texas College	0	–	3	–	1	?	–	?	–	?
$ – Conference champion

1931 Texas Conference football standings
	Conf.					Overall
Team	W		L		T	W		L		T
Howard Payne +	4	–	1	–	0	6	–	2	–	0
Simmons (TX) +	4	–	1	–	0	6	–	5	–	0
Austin	3	–	2	–	0	3	–	5	–	1
Southwestern (TX)	2	–	3	–	0	4	–	6	–	0
St. Edward's	1	–	3	–	1	1	–	5	–	1
Trinity (TX)	0	–	4	–	1	2	–	6	–	1
+ – Conference co-champions

1931 Texas Intercollegiate Athletic Association football standings
	Conf.					Overall
Team	W		L		T	W		L		T
Eastern Division
North Texas State Teachers x$	4	–	0	–	0	8	–	3	–	0
Texas A&I	4	–	0	–	0	8	–	1	–	0
Sam Houston State	3	–	2	–	0	4	–	5	–	0
Southwest Texas State	2	–	3	–	0	4	–	4	–	0
East Texas State	1	–	4	–	0	3	–	6	–	0
Stephen F. Austin	0	–	5	–	0	1	–	7	–	0
Western Division
Daniel Baker x	3	–	2	–	0	4	–	5	–	0
Abilene Christian	3	–	2	–	0	4	–	5	–	0
West Texas State	2	–	2	–	0	6	–	3	–	0
McMurry	2	–	2	–	0	2	–	6	–	0
Sul Ross	1	–	3	–	0	3	–	5	–	0
Championship: North Texas State Teachers 32, Daniel Baker 13
$ – Conference champion; x – Division champion/co-champions; y – Championship game participant

1931 Tri-State Conference football standings
	Conf.					Overall
Team	W		L		T	W		L		T
Geneva $	3	–	0	–	0	6	–	2	–	2
Waynesburg	2	–	1	–	0	3	–	3	–	2
Thiel	2	–	1	–	0	4	–	5	–	0
Bethany (WV)	0	–	2	–	0	1	–	6	–	0
Westminster (PA)	0	–	3	–	0	3	–	6	–	0
$ – Conference champion

1931 Virginia Conference football standings
	Conf.					Overall
Team	W		L		T	W		L		T
Randolph–Macon $	5	–	1	–	0	7	–	1	–	1
William & Mary	4	–	1	–	0	5	–	2	–	2
Richmond	3	–	2	–	0	4	–	5	–	0
Roanoke	2	–	3	–	0	5	–	4	–	0
Emory and Henry	2	–	3	–	0	6	–	5	–	0
Lynchburg	2	–	3	–	0	4	–	6	–	0
Hampden–Sydney	2	–	3	–	0	3	–	6	–	0
Bridgewater	0	–	4	–	0	0	–	5	–	0
$ – Conference champion

1931 West Virginia Athletic Conference football standings
	Conf.					Overall
Team	W		L		T	W		L		T
Marshall $	4	–	1	–	0	6	–	3	–	0
Glenville State	3	–	1	–	1	4	–	1	–	1
Morris Harvey	4	–	5	–	0	5	–	5	–	0
Salem	2	–	3	–	0	2	–	6	–	0
Fairmont State	1	–	5	–	0	1	–	7	–	0
Concord	0	–	5	–	0	0	–	7	–	0
West Virginia Wesleyan *	3	–	0	–	0	6	–	3	–	1
West Liberty State *	2	–	0	–	1	7	–	1	–	1
Davis & Elkins *	2	–	0	–	0	10	–	1	–	0
New River State *	1	–	0	–	0	5	–	2	–	1
Morehead State *	1	–	1	–	0	4	–	2	–	1
Shepherd *	1	–	1	–	0	4	–	3	–	1
Bethany (WV) *	1	–	2	–	0	1	–	6	–	0
Potomac State *	1	–	2	–	0	1	–	4	–	0
$ – Conference champion; * – Did not qualify for conference standings Ties did not count in conference standings.

1931 Wisconsin State Teachers College Conference football standings
	Conf.					Overall
Team	W		L		T	W		L		T
Milwaukee State $	4	–	0	–	0	5	–	2	–	0
Superior State	3	–	0	–	0	7	–	0	–	0
River Falls State	3	–	1	–	0	3	–	4	–	1
Whitewater State	3	–	1	–	0	6	–	1	–	0
La Crosse State	4	–	2	–	0	5	–	2	–	1
Oshkosh State	2	–	3	–	1	3	–	4	–	1
Platteville State	1	–	2	–	1	4	–	2	–	1
Eau Claire State	1	–	3	–	1	1	–	5	–	1
Stevens Point State	0	–	5	–	1	1	–	6	–	1
Stout Institute	0	–	4	–	0	2	–	6	–	0
$ – Conference champion

== Rankings ==
All major rankings (both contemporary and retroactive) have identified the University of Southern California as the season's champions, with exception of Parke H. Davis's retroactive ranking for Spalding's Official Foot Ball Guide (which identified Pittsburgh and Purdue as co-champions).

Although Tulane was unbeaten and untied (11–0), they were second to 9–1 USC in the final Dickinson System mathematical ratings. The teams were set to face off in the 1932 Rose Bowl on New Year's Day. The Trojans requested that presentation of the Knute Rockne Memorial Trophy be delayed until after the game. During the delay, it was decided that the Dickinson System trophy would go to the winner of the Rose Bowl game. USC ultimately won the game.

== Statistical leaders ==
- Player scoring most points: Bob Campiglio, West Liberty, 145

== See also ==
- 1931 College Football All-America Team
