= Frazer Field =

Sports venue in Newark, Delaware

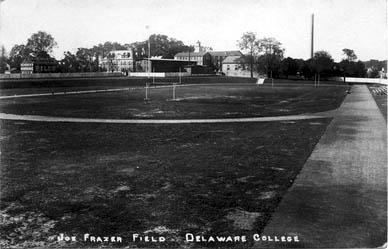
- Frazer Field in 1914
- Full name: Joe Frazer Field
- Location: N. College Ave. and Center St. Newark, DE 19711
- Owner: University of Delaware
- Surface: Field Turf (2010–present); Natural grass (1913–2010)

Construction
- Opened: June 18, 1913; 113 years ago
- Cost: $50,000

Tenants
- Delaware Blue Hens (NCAA) teams: football (1913–1946)

Joe Frazer Field is an athletic field in Newark, Delaware that was used for the University of Delaware's baseball, track and field, football and tennis teams.

== History ==
The stadium was dedicated on June 18, 1913. The field's construction was made possible through a large memorial donation by the parents of Joseph Heckart Frazer, a 1903 graduate of Delaware College.

The first Fightin' Blue Hens football game at Frazer Field occurred on October 18, 1913 when Delaware beat visiting Temple 28–0. The Blue Hens played their final game at Frazer Field on October 26, 1946, when they defeated Drexel 52–0 en route to their first national championship.

The university installed a new Field Turf surface in September 2010.
