= 1931 Richmond Spiders football team =

American college football season

1931 Richmond Spiders football
- Conference: Virginia Conference
- Record: 4–5 (3–2 Virginia)
- Head coach: Frank Dobson (18th season)
- Captain: Watt Fugate
- Home stadium: City Stadium

1931 Virginia Conference football standings
	Conf.					Overall
Team	W		L		T	W		L		T
Randolph–Macon $	5	–	1	–	0	7	–	1	–	1
William & Mary	4	–	1	–	0	5	–	2	–	2
Richmond	3	–	2	–	0	4	–	5	–	0
Roanoke	2	–	3	–	0	5	–	4	–	0
Emory and Henry	2	–	3	–	0	6	–	5	–	0
Lynchburg	2	–	3	–	0	4	–	6	–	0
Hampden–Sydney	2	–	3	–	0	3	–	6	–	0
Bridgewater	0	–	4	–	0	0	–	5	–	0
$ – Conference champion

The 1931 Richmond Spiders football team was an American football team that represented the University of Richmond as a member of the Virginia Conference during the 1931 college football season. In their 18th season under head coach Frank Dobson, Richmond compiled a 4–5 record.

== Schedule ==
Date	Opponent	Site	Result	Attendance	Source
September 26	at VMI*	Alumni Field; Lexington, VA (rivalry)	W 7–0	2,000	
October 3	Emory and Henry	City Stadium; Richmond, VA	L 7–13	3,000	
October 10	at Cornell*	Schoellkopf Field; Ithaca, NY	L 0–27		
October 17	at Furman*	Manly Field; Greenville, SC	L 6–34		
October 24	at Delaware*	Frazer Field; Newark, DE	L 0–7	5,000	
October 31	Roanoke	City Stadium; Richmond, VA	W 7–2		
November 7	Randolph–Macon	City Stadium; Richmond, VA	L 6–14		
November 14	Hampden–Sydney	City Stadium; Richmond, VA	W 9–0		
November 26	William & Mary	City Stadium; Richmond, VA (rivalry)	W 6–2	14,000	
*Non-conference game
