= 1931 in Michigan =

- Decades: 1910s; 1920s; 1930s; 1940s; 1950s
- See also: History of Michigan; Historical outline of Michigan; List of years in Michigan; 1931 in the United States

Events from the year 1931 in Michigan.

== Office holders ==
=== State office holders ===
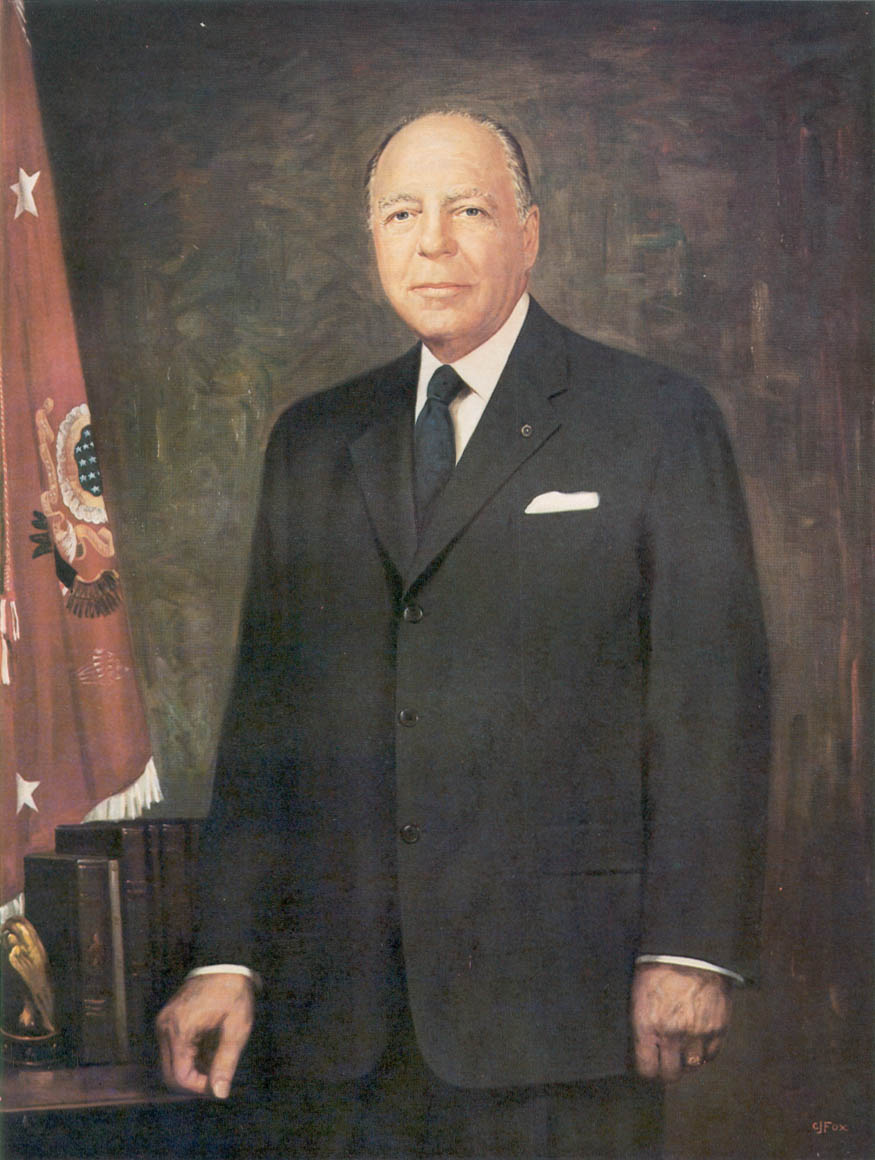
Gov. Wilber Brucker

- Governor of Michigan: Wilber M. Brucker (Republican)
- Lieutenant Governor of Michigan: Luren D. Dickinson (Republican)
- Michigan Attorney General: Paul W. Voorhies (Republican)
- Michigan Secretary of State: Frank D. Fitzgerald (Republican)
- Speaker of the Michigan House of Representatives: Fred R. Ming (Republican)
- Chief Justice, Michigan Supreme Court: Henry M. Butzel

=== Mayors of major cities ===
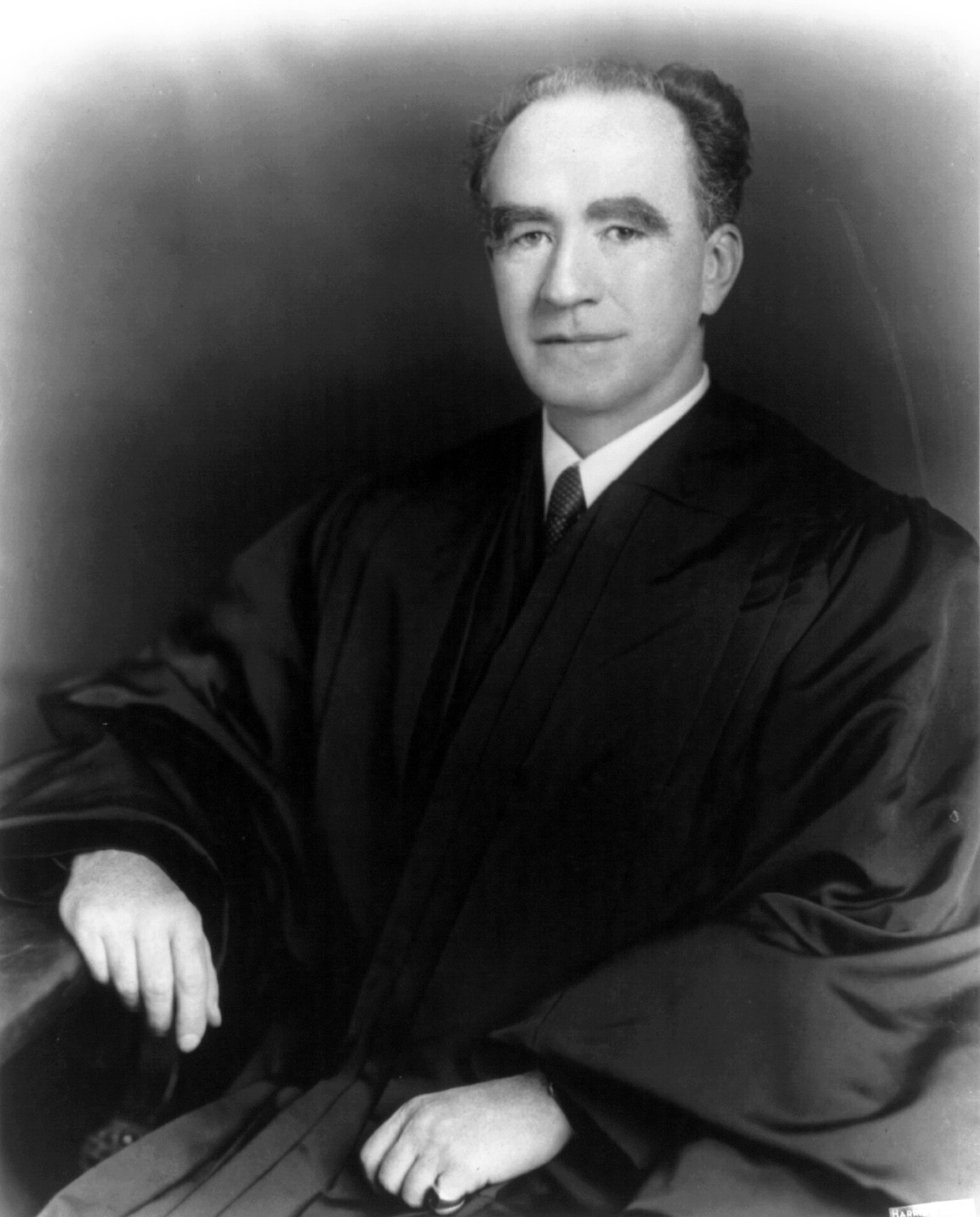
Mayor Frank Murphy

- Mayor of Detroit: Frank Murphy (Democrat)
- Mayor of Grand Rapids: John D. Karel
- Mayor of Flint: William H. McKeighan
- Mayor of Saginaw: Ben N. Mercer
- Mayor of Lansing: Peter F. Gray
- Mayor of Ann Arbor: Edward W. Staebler/H. Wirt Newkirk

=== Federal office holders ===
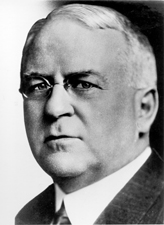
Sen. James Couzens

- U.S. Senator from Michigan: James J. Couzens (Republican)
- U.S. Senator from Michigan: Arthur Vandenberg (Republican)
- House District 1: Robert H. Clancy (Democrat)
- House District 2: Earl C. Michener (Republican)
- House District 3: Joseph L. Hooper (Republican)
- House District 4: John C. Ketcham (Republican)
- House District 5: Carl E. Mapes (Republican)
- House District 6: Grant M. Hudson (Republican)/Seymour H. Person (Republican)
- House District 7: Louis C. Cramton (Republican)/Jesse P. Wolcott (Republican)
- House District 8: Bird J. Vincent (Republican)/Michael J. Hart (Democrat)
- House District 9: James C. McLaughlin (Republican)
- House District 10: Roy O. Woodruff (Republican)
- House District 11: Frank P. Bohn (Democrat)
- House District 12: W. Frank James (Republican)
- House District 13: Clarence J. McLeod (Republican)

== Population ==
In the 1930 United States census, Michigan was recorded as having a population of 4,842,325, ranking as the seventh most populous state in the country. By 1940, Michigan's population had increased by 8.5% to 5,256,106.

=== Cities ===
The following is a list of cities in Michigan with a population of at least 20,000 based on 1930 U.S. Census data. Historic census data from 1920 and 1940 is included to reflect trends in population increases or decreases. Cities that are part of the Detroit metropolitan area are shaded in tan.

1930 Rank	City	County	1920 Pop.	1930 Pop.	1940 Pop.	Change 1930-40
1	Detroit	Wayne	993,678	1,568,662	1,623,452	3.5%
2	Grand Rapids	Kent	137,634	168,592	164,292	−2.6%
3	Flint	Genesee	91,599	156,492	151,543	−3.2%
4	Saginaw	Saginaw	61,903	80,715	82,794	2.6%
5	Lansing	Ingham	57,327	78,397	78,753	0.5%
6	Pontiac	Oakland	34,273	64,928	66,626	2.6%
7	Hamtramck	Wayne	48,615	56,268	49,839	−11.4%
8	Jackson	Jackson	48,374	55,187	49,656	−10.0%
9	Kalamazoo	Kalamazoo	48,487	54,786	54,097	−1.3%
10	Highland Park	Wayne	46,499	52,959	50,810	−4.1%
11	Dearborn	Wayne	2,470	50,358	63,589	26.3%
12	Bay City	Bay	47,554	47,355	47,956	1.3%
13	Battle Creek	Calhoun	36,164	45,573	43,453	−4.7%
14	Muskegon	Muskegon	36,570	41,390	47,697	15.2%
15	Port Huron	St. Clair	25,944	31,361	32,759	4.5%
16	Wyandotte	Wayne	13,851	28,368	30,618	7.9%
17	Ann Arbor	Washtenaw	19,516	26,944	29,815	10.7%
18	Royal Oak	Oakland	6,007	22,904	25,087	9.5%
19	Ferndale	Oakland	2,640	20,855	22,523	8.0%

=== Counties ===
The following is a list of counties in Michigan with populations of at least 50,000 based on 1930 U.S. Census data. Historic census data from 1920 and 1940 are included to reflect trends in population increases or decreases.

1930 Rank	County	Largest city	1920 Pop.	1930 Pop.	1940 Pop.	Change 1930-40
1	Wayne	Detroit	1,177,645	1,888,946	2,015,623	6.7%
2	Kent	Grand Rapids	183,041	240,511	246,338	2.4%
3	Genesee	Flint	125,668	211,641	227,944	7.7%
4	Oakland	Pontiac	90,050	211,251	254,068	20.3%
5	Saginaw	Saginaw	100,286	120,717	130,468	8.1%
6	Ingham	Lansing	81,554	116,587	130,616	12.0%
7	Jackson	Jackson	72,539	92,304	93,108	0.9%
8	Kalamazoo	Kalamazoo	71,225	91,368	100,085	9.5%
9	Calhoun	Battle Creek	72,918	87,043	94,206	8.2%
10	Muskegon	Muskegon	62,362	84,630	94,501	11.7%
11	Berrien	Benton Harbor	62,653	81,066	89,117	9.9%
12	Macomb	Warren	38,103	77,146	107,638	39.5%
13	Bay	Bay City	69,548	69,474	74,981	7.9%
14	St. Clair	Port Huron	58,009	67,563	76,222	12.8%
15	Washtenaw	Ann Arbor	49,520	65,530	80,810	23.3%
16	Ottawa	Holland	47,660	54,858	59,660	8.8%
17	Houghton	Houghton	71,930	52,851	47,631	−9.9%
18	Monroe	Monroe	37,115	52,485	58,620	11.7%
19	Lenawee	Adrian	47,767	49,849	53,110	6.5%

== Sports ==
=== Baseball ===
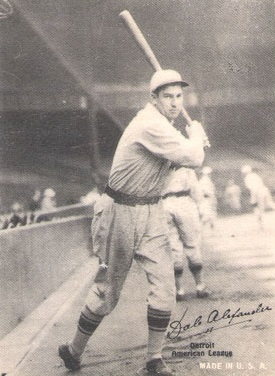
Dale Alexander

- 1931 Detroit Tigers season – Under manager Bucky Harris, the Tigers compiled a 61-93 record and finished in seventh place in the American League. The team's statistical leaders included John Stone with a .327 batting average and 10 home runs, Dale Alexander with 87 RBIs, Earl Whitehill and Vic Sorrell with 13 wins each, and George Uhle with a 3.50 earned run average.
- 1931 Michigan Wolverines baseball season - Under head coach Ray Fisher, the Wolverines compiled a 14–9–1 record. Jack Tompkins was the team captain.

=== American football ===
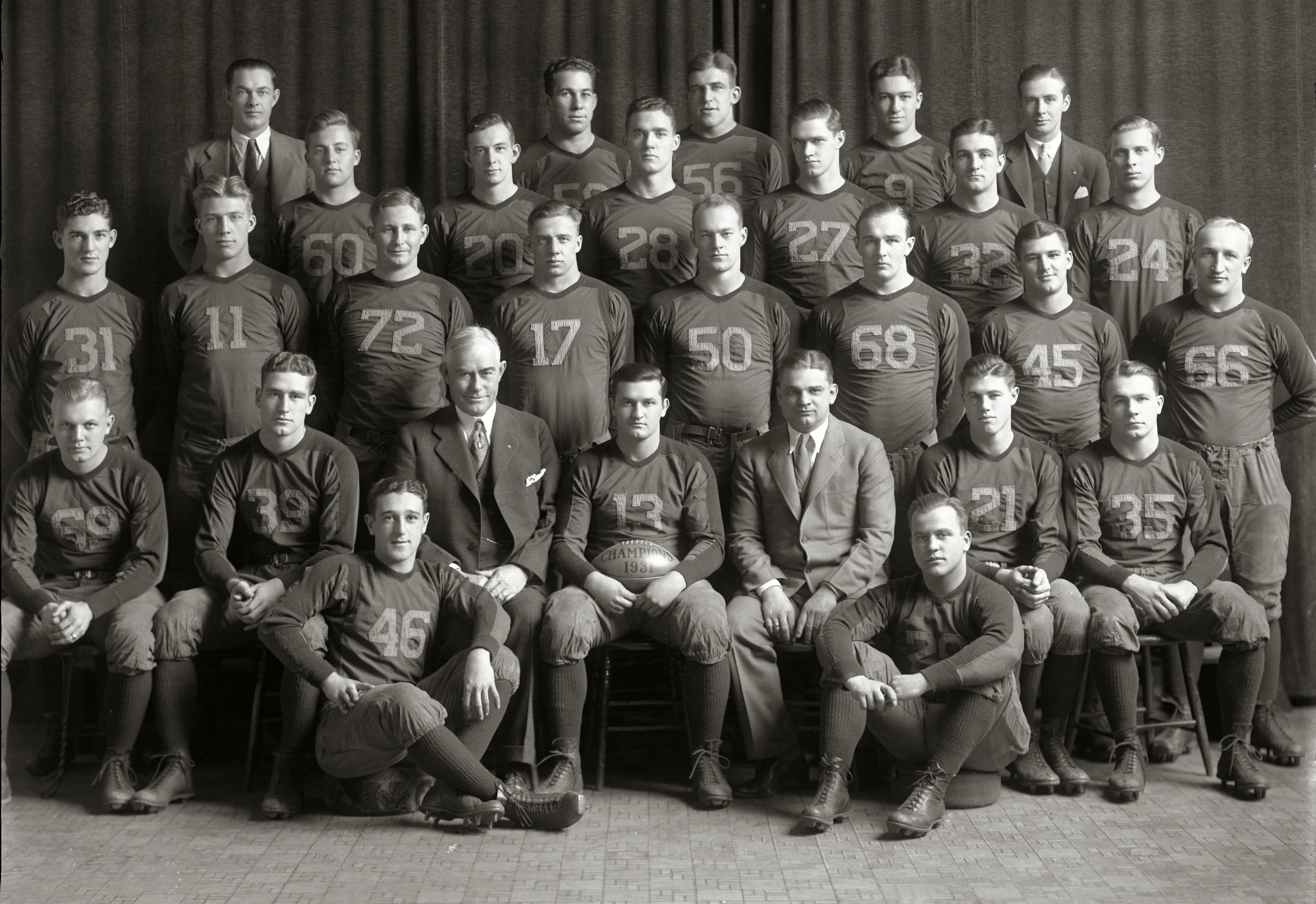
1931 Michigan football team

- 1931 Michigan Wolverines football team – Under head coach Harry Kipke, the Wolverines compiled an 8–1–1 record and tied for the Big Ten Conference championship. Bill Hewitt was selected as the team's most valuable player.
- 1931 Detroit Titans football team – The Titans compiled a 7–2–1 record under head coach Gus Dorais.
- 1931 Michigan State Spartans football team – Under head coach Jim Crowley, the Spartans compiled a 5–3–1 record.
- 1931 Western State Hilltoppers football team - Under head coach Mike Gary, the Hilltoppers compiled a 5–2 record.
- 1931 Michigan State Normal Hurons football team - Under head coach Elton Rynearson, the Hurons compiled a 3–2–1 record.
- 1931 Central State Bearcats football team - Under head coach George Van Bibber the Bearcats compiled a 4–3 record.
- 1931 City College of Detroit football team – The City College of Detroit (later known as Wayne State University compiled a 0–6–1 record under head coach Norman G. Wann.

=== Basketball ===
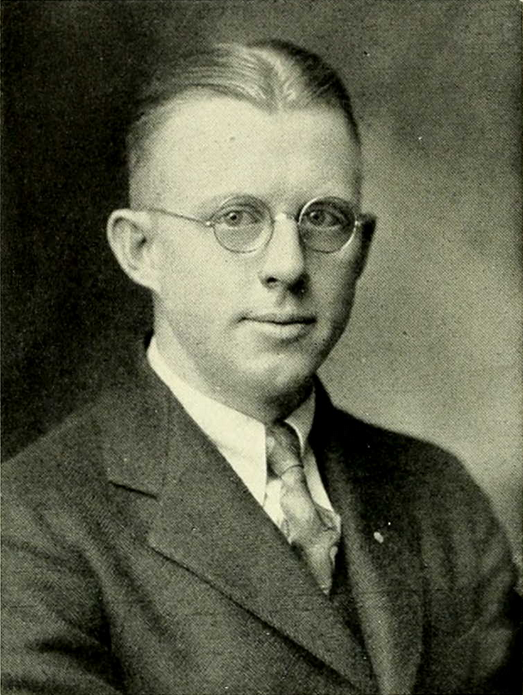
Benjamin Van Alstyne

- 1930–31 Michigan State Spartans men's basketball team – Under head coach Benjamin Van Alstyne, the Spartans compiled a 16–1 record.
- 1930–31 Western Michigan Broncos men's basketball team – Under head coach Buck Read, the Broncos compiled a 14–3 record.
- 1930–31 Michigan Wolverines men's basketball team – Under head coach Franklin Cappon, the Wolverines compiled a 13–4 record.
- 1930–31 City College of Detroit (CCD) men's basketball team – Under coach Newman Ertell, CCD (later known as Wayne State) compiled an 11–8 record.
- 1930–31 Detroit Titans men's basketball team – Under head coach Lloyd Brazil, the Titans compiled a 10–9 record.

=== Ice hockey ===
- 1930–31 Detroit Falcons season – Under coach Jack Adams, the Falcons compiled a 16–21–7 record and finished in fourth place in the National Hockey League (NHL) American Division. Ebbie Goodfellow led the team with 25 goals, 23 assists, and 48 points. Dolly Dolson was the team's goaltender.
- 1930–31 Michigan Wolverines men's ice hockey team – Under head coach Ed Lowrey, the Wolverines compiled a 10–5–2 record.
- 1930–31 Michigan Tech Huskies men's ice hockey team – Under head coach Bert Noblet, the Huskies compiled a 2–7 record.

=== Other ===
- Port Huron to Mackinac Boat Race –
- Michigan Open -

== Chronology of events ==
=== September ===
- September 16 - Collingwood Manor Massacre

== Births ==
- March 9 - Sam Williams, NFL defensive lineman (1959-1967), in Dansville, Michigan
- March 25 - Roger Zatkoff, NFL player (1953-1958), in Hamtramck, Michigan
- June 20 - James Tolkan, actor (Back to the Future trilogy, WarGames, Top Gun), in Calumet, Michigan
- July 16 - Mighty Igor, professional wrestler billed as the "World's Strongest Wrestler", in Dearborn, Michigan
- July 21 - J. Bob Traxler, U.S. Congressman (1974-1993), in Kawkawlin, Michigan
- July 26 - William L. Rowe, philosopher of religion, in Detroit
- August 26 - Guy Vander Jagt, U.S. Congressman (1966-1993), in Cadillac, Michigan
- September 6 - Sander Levin, U.S. Congressman (1983-2013), in Detroit
- October 22 - Ann Rule, true crime author (The Stranger Beside Me), in Lowell, Michigan
- December 7 - Billy Wells, NFL/AFL halfback (1954-1960), in Menominee, Michigan

=== Gallery of 1931 births ===
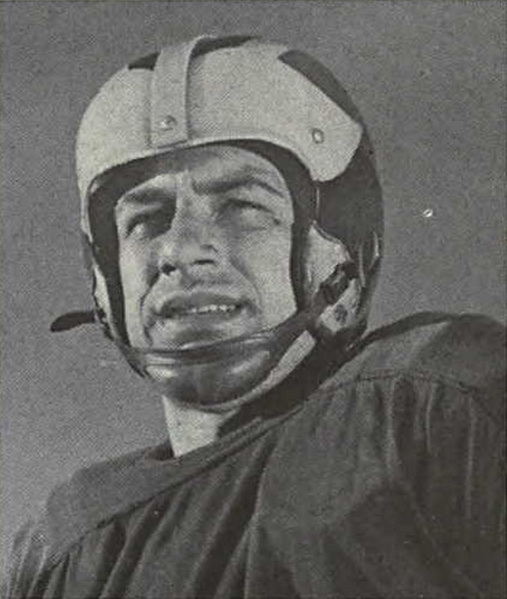
Roger Zatkoff

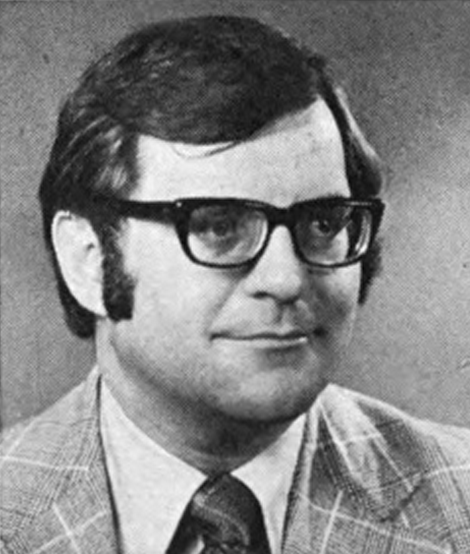
J. Bob Traxler

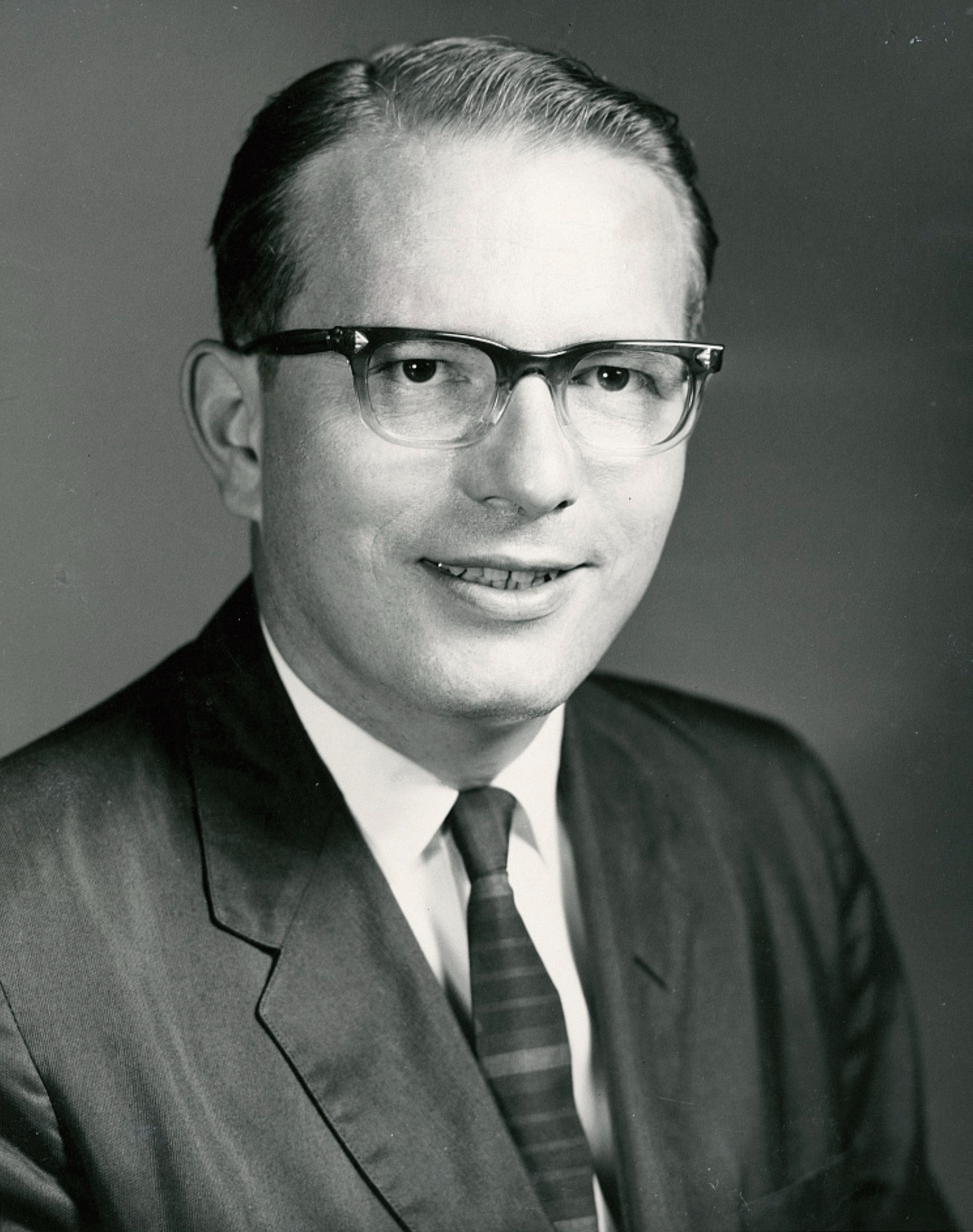
Guy Vander Jagt

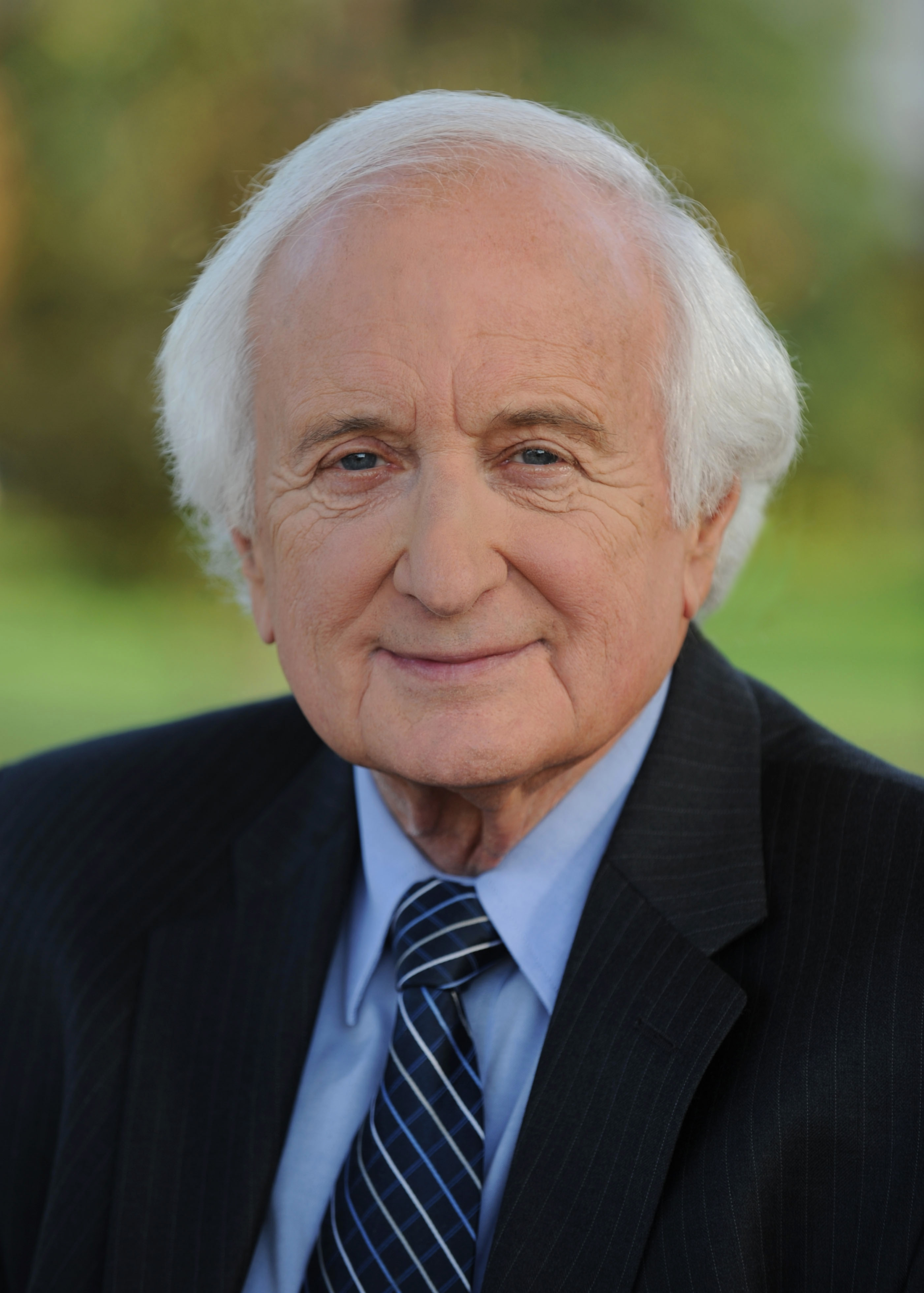
Sander Levin

== Deaths ==
- June 13 - Samuel William Smith, U.S. Congressman (1897-1915), at age 78 in Detroit
- July 18 - Bird J. Vincent, U.S. Congressman (1923-1931), at age 51 aboard a ship in the Pacific Ocean
- September - Robert R. Blacker, Michigan Secretary of State (1891–1892), at age 86 in Santa Monica, California
- October 6 - Albert M. Todd, founder of the A.M. Todd Company, a world leader in the production of peppermint oil and other botanical extracts, at age 81 in Kalamazoo, Michigan
- November 26 - Edmond H. Barmore, the first University of Michigan quarterback, at age 71 in Los Angeles

=== Gallery of 1931 deaths ===
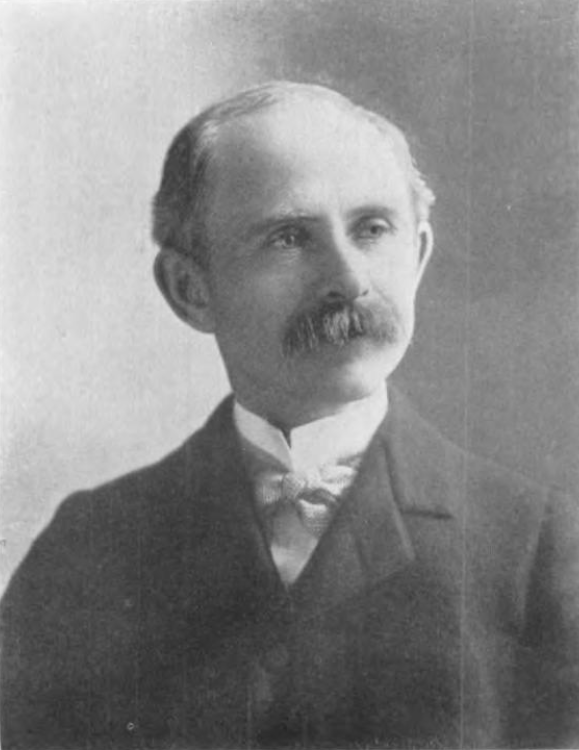
Samuel W. Smith

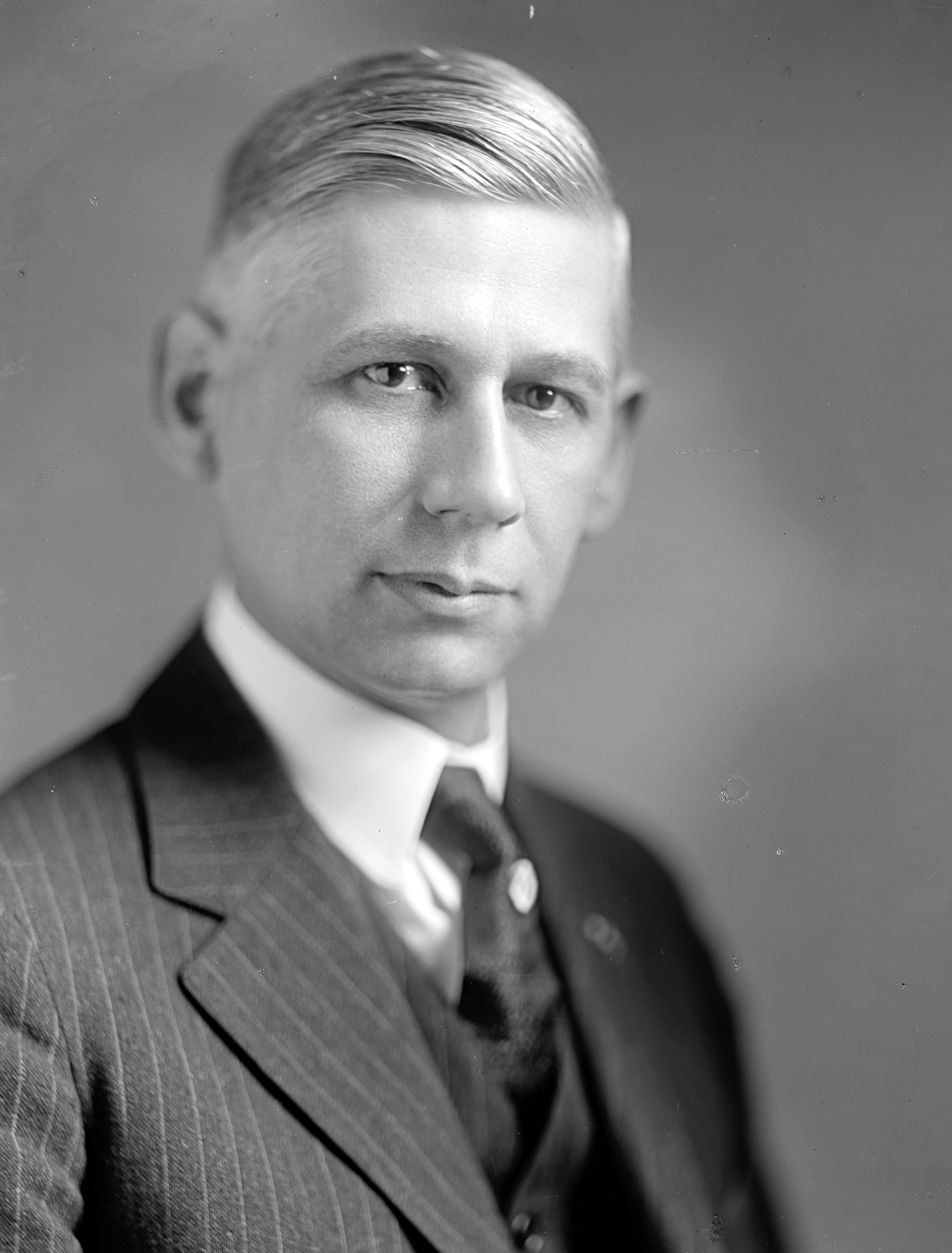
Bird J. Vincent

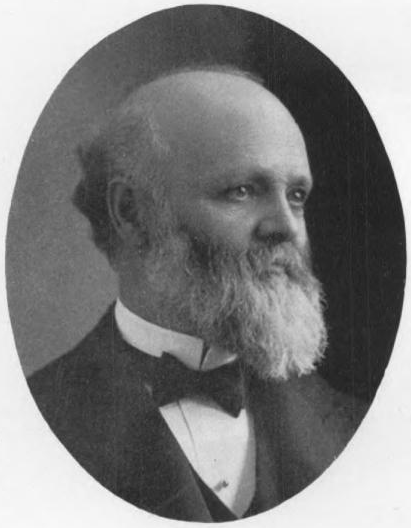
Robert R. Blacker

Albert M. Todd

Edmond H. Barmore

== See also ==
- History of Michigan
- History of Detroit
