= 1931 Lincoln Blue Tigers football team =

American college football season

1931 Lincoln Blue Tigers football
- Conference: Independent
- Record: 5–0–1
- Head coach: David M. Waters (3rd season)

1931 Midwestern college football independents records
	Conf.			Overall
Team	W	L	T	W		L		T
Wilberforce		–		8	–	0	–	0
Lincoln (MO)		–		5	–	0	–	1
Marquette		–		8	–	1	–	0
Saint Louis		–		8	–	1	–	0
Detroit		–		7	–	2	–	1
Western State Teachers		–		5	–	2	–	0
No. 11 Notre Dame		–		6	–	2	–	1
DePaul		–		6	–	3	–	0
Michigan State		–		5	–	3	–	1
Haskell		–		6	–	4	–	0
Michigan Tech		–		3	–	2	–	0
Michigan State Normal		–		3	–	2	–	1
Central State (MI)		–		4	–	3	–	0
John Carroll		–		4	–	4	–	2
Wittenberg		–		3	–	3	–	3
Kent State		–		3	–	4	–	0
Rankings from Dickinson System

The 1931 Lincoln Tigers football team represented Lincoln Institute—now known as Lincoln University—in Jefferson City, Missouri as an independent during the 1931 college football season. Led by David M. Waters in his third and final season as Lincoln's head coach, the Blue Tigers compiled a record of 5–0–1.

== Schedule ==
Date	Time	Opponent	Site	Result	Source
October 17		at Arkansas AM&N	Pine Bluff, AR	W 7–6	
October 24		Lane	Jefferson City, MO	W 34–9	
October 31		LeMoyne	Jefferson City, MO	W 13–2	
November 7	2:30 p.m.	Louisville Municipal^{†}	Jefferson City, MO	W 52–13	
November 14		West Kentucky Industrial	Jefferson City, MO	W 25–0	
November 26	2:00 p.m.	at Western University (KS)	Union Pacific Park; Kansas City, MO	T 0–0	
^{†}Homecoming; All times are in Central time
