= 1931 Marquette Golden Avalanche football team =

American college football season

1931 Marquette Golden Avalanche football
- Conference: Independent
- Record: 8–1
- Head coach: Frank Murray (10th season)
- Home stadium: Marquette Stadium

1931 Midwestern college football independents records
	Conf.			Overall
Team	W	L	T	W		L		T
Wilberforce		–		8	–	0	–	0
Lincoln (MO)		–		5	–	0	–	1
Marquette		–		8	–	1	–	0
Saint Louis		–		8	–	1	–	0
Detroit		–		7	–	2	–	1
Western State Teachers		–		5	–	2	–	0
No. 11 Notre Dame		–		6	–	2	–	1
DePaul		–		6	–	3	–	0
Michigan State		–		5	–	3	–	1
Haskell		–		6	–	4	–	0
Michigan Tech		–		3	–	2	–	0
Michigan State Normal		–		3	–	2	–	1
Central State (MI)		–		4	–	3	–	0
John Carroll		–		4	–	4	–	2
Wittenberg		–		3	–	3	–	3
Kent State		–		3	–	4	–	0
Rankings from Dickinson System

The 1931 Marquette Golden Avalanche football team represented Marquette University as an independent during the 1931 college football season. In its 10th season under head coach Frank Murray, the team compiled an 8–1 record, shut out five of nine opponents, and outscored all opponents by a total of 172 to 25. The sole setback was a loss to Gus Dorais' Detroit Titans on October 16. Marquette played its home games at Marquette Stadium in Milwaukee.

Frank Murray was Marquette's head football coach for 19 years and was posthumously inducted into the College Football Hall of Fame in 1983.

== Schedule ==
Date	Opponent	Site	Result	Attendance	Source
October 2	at Lawrence	Appleton, WI	W 39–0		
October 9	at Ripon	Ripon, WI	W 40–0		
October 16	Detroit	Dinan Field; Detroit, MI	L 0–7	15,000	
October 24	at Boston College	Fenway Park; Boston, MA	W 7–0	5,000	
October 30	Ole Miss	Marquette Stadium; Milwaukee, WI	W 13–6	8,000	
November 7	Washington & Jefferson	Marquette Stadium; Milwaukee, WI	W 13–6		
November 14	Butler	Marquette Stadium; Milwaukee, WI	W 21–0		
November 21	Creighton	Marquette Stadium; Milwaukee, WI	W 7–0	7,500	
November 28	at Drake	Drake Stadium; Des Moines, IA	W 32–6		
