= 1931 Oklahoma A&M Cowboys football team =

American college football season

1931 Oklahoma A&M Cowboys football
- Conference: Missouri Valley Conference
- Record: 8–2–1 (1–0 MVC)
- Head coach: Pappy Waldorf (3rd season)
- Home stadium: Lewis Field

1931 Missouri Valley Conference football standings
	Conf.					Overall
Team	W		L		T	W		L		T
Drake $	3	–	0	–	0	5	–	6	–	0
Oklahoma A&M	1	–	0	–	0	8	–	2	–	1
Creighton	2	–	2	–	0	4	–	5	–	0
Grinnell	1	–	2	–	0	5	–	3	–	0
Washington University	0	–	3	–	0	2	–	7	–	0
$ – Conference champion

The 1931 Oklahoma A&M Cowboys football team represented Oklahoma A&M College in the 1931 college football season. This was the 31st year of football at A&M and the third under Pappy Waldorf. The Cowboys played their home games at Lewis Field in Stillwater, Oklahoma. They finished the season 8–2–1 overall and 1–0 in the Missouri Valley Conference.

== Schedule ==
Date	Opponent	Site	Result	Attendance	Source
September 25	Bethany (KS)*	Lewis Field; Stillwater, OK	W 34–0		
September 25	Northeastern State*	Lewis Field; Stillwater, OK	W 25–0		
October 3	at Minnesota*	Memorial Stadium; Minneapolis, MN	L 0–20	20,000	
October 9	Arizona*	Lewis Field; Stillwater, OK	W 31–0		
October 16	Haskell*	Lewis Field; Stillwater, OK	W 42–0	12,000	
October 23	at Oklahoma City*	Goldbug Field; Oklahoma City, OK	L 0–13		
October 31	at Kansas*	Memorial Stadium; Lawrence, KS	W 13–7		
November 7	Crieghton^{†}	Lewis Field; Stillwater, OK	W 20–0	6,000	
November 14	at Tulsa*	Skelly Field; Tulsa, OK (rivalry)	W 7–6		
November 21	Wichita*	Lewis Field; Stillwater, OK	W 14–6		
November 26	at Oklahoma*	Oklahoma Memorial Stadium; Norman, OK (Bedlam Series)	T 0–0		
*Non-conference game; ^{†}Homecoming
