= 1931 Oklahoma City Goldbugs football team =

American college football season

1931 Oklahoma City Goldbugs football

Big Four champion
- Conference: Big Four Conference
- Record: 12–0 (3–0 Big Four)
- Head coach: Vee Green (4th season)
- Home stadium: Goldbug Field

1931 Big Four Conference (Oklahoma) football standings
	Conf.					Overall
Team	W		L		T	W		L		T
Oklahoma City $	3	–	0	–	0	12	–	0	–	0
Tulsa	2	–	1	–	0	8	–	3	–	0
Oklahoma Baptist	1	–	2	–	0	3	–	6	–	0
Phillips	0	–	3	–	0	1	–	5	–	0
$ – Conference champion

The 1931 Oklahoma City Goldbugs football team was an American football team that represented Oklahoma City University as a member of the Big Four Conference during the 1931 college football season. In Vee Green's fourth season as head coach, the team compiled a perfect record of 12–0 and won the conference championship, outscoring their competition by a combined point total of 269 to 45 and shutting out eight of their opponents.

== Schedule ==
Date	Time	Opponent	Site	Result	Attendance	Source
September 17	8:00 p.m.	Central State Teachers*	Goldbug Field; Oklahoma City, OK	W 20–0		
September 25		Friends*	Goldbug Field; Oklahoma City, OK	W 45–0		
October 3		Arkansas Tech*	Goldbug Field; Oklahoma City, OK	W 25–12		
October 9		Missouri Mines*	Goldbug Field; Oklahoma City, OK	W 6–0		
October 16		at Phillips	Enid, OK	W 28–14		
October 23		Oklahoma A&M*	Goldbug Field; Oklahoma City, OK	W 13–0		
October 30		at Saint Louis*	Edward J. Walsh Memorial Stadium; St. Louis, MO	W 14–13	8,500	
November 6		Oklahoma Baptist	Goldbug Field; Oklahoma City, OK	W 33–0		
November 14		Haskell*	Goldbug Field; Oklahoma City, OK	W 28–6	9,000	
November 21		Nebraska Wesleyan*	Goldbug Field; Oklahoma City, OK	W 37–0		
November 26		at Tulsa	Skelly Field; Tulsa, OK	W 14–0		
December 5		Oklahoma*	Goldbug Field; Oklahoma City, OK	W 6–0	14,000	
*Non-conference game
