= 1931 South Dakota State Jackrabbits football team =

American college football season

1931 South Dakota State Jackrabbits football
- Conference: North Central Conference
- Record: 6–3 (2–2 NCC)
- Head coach: Cy Kasper (4th season)

1931 North Central Conference football standings
	Conf.					Overall
Team	W		L		T	W		L		T
North Dakota $	4	–	0	–	0	8	–	1	–	2
South Dakota State	2	–	2	–	0	6	–	3	–	0
North Dakota Agricultural	2	–	2	–	0	5	–	5	–	0
South Dakota	1	–	3	–	0	2	–	5	–	0
Morningside	1	–	3	–	0	2	–	6	–	0
$ – Conference champion

The 1931 South Dakota State Jackrabbits football team was an American football team that represented South Dakota State University in the North Central Conference (NCC) during the 1931 college football season. In its fourth season under head coach Cy Kasper, the team compiled a 6–3 record and outscored opponents by a total of 194 to 78.

== Schedule ==
Date	Opponent	Site	Result	Attendance	Source
September 18	Southern Normal*	Brookings, SD	W 34–0		
September 26	Dakota Wesleyan*	Brookings, SD	W 39–0		
October 2	at Northern State*	Aberdeen, SD	W 19–0		
October 10	Morningside	Brookings, SD	W 20–0		
October 17	North Dakota	Brookings, SD	L 6–34		
October 24	at North Dakota Agricultural	Dacotah Field; Fargo, ND (rivalry)	W 7–0		
October 31	at South Dakota	Inman Field; Vermillion, SD (rivalry)	L 0–10		
November 6	at Augustana (SD)*	Sioux Falls, SD	W 49–0		
November 11	at Saint Mary's (MN	Winona, MN			
November 14	at DePaul*	Chicago, IL	L 20–34	15,000	
*Non-conference game
