= 1931 Kansas Jayhawks football team =

American college football season

1931 Kansas Jayhawks football
- Conference: Big Six Conference
- Record: 5–5 (1–3 Big 6)
- Head coach: Bill Hargiss (4th season)
- Captain: Otto Rost
- Home stadium: Memorial Stadium

1931 Big Six Conference football standings
| | Conf. | | | | | Overall |
| Team | W | | L | | T | W | | L | | T |
|---|---|---|---|---|---|---|---|---|---|---|
| Nebraska $ | 5 | – | 0 | – | 0 | 8 | – | 2 | – | 0 |
| Iowa State | 3 | – | 1 | – | 0 | 5 | – | 3 | – | 0 |
| Kansas State | 3 | – | 2 | – | 0 | 8 | – | 2 | – | 0 |
| Kansas | 1 | – | 3 | – | 0 | 5 | – | 5 | – | 0 |
| Missouri | 1 | – | 4 | – | 0 | 2 | – | 8 | – | 0 |
| Oklahoma | 1 | – | 4 | – | 0 | 4 | – | 7 | – | 1 |
$ – Conference champion

The 1931 Kansas Jayhawks football team represented the University of Kansas in the Big Six Conference during the 1931 college football season. In their fourth season under head coach Bill Hargiss, the Jayhawks compiled a 5–5 record (1–3 against conference opponents), finished in fourth place in the conference, and outscored opponents by a combined total of 112 to 54. They played their home games at Memorial Stadium in Lawrence, Kansas. Otto Rost was the team captain.

== Schedule ==
| Date | Opponent | Site | Result | Attendance | Source |
|---|---|---|---|---|---|
| September 26 | Colorado Agricultural* | Memorial Stadium; Lawrence, KS | W 27–6 | 6,000 | |
| October 2 | Haskell* | Memorial Stadium; Lawrence, KS | L 0–6 | 11,000 | |
| October 10 | Millikin* | Memorial Stadium; Lawrence, KS | W 30–0 | | |
| October 17 | Kansas State | Memorial Stadium; Lawrence, KS (rivalry) | L 0–13 | | |
| October 24 | at Nebraska | Memorial Stadium; Lincoln, NE (rivalry) | L 0–6 | 16,517–20,000 | |
| October 31 | Oklahoma A&M* | Memorial Stadium; Lawrence, KS | L 7–13 | | |
| November 7 | at Oklahoma | Memorial Stadium; Norman, OK | L 0–10 | | |
| November 14 | at Washington University* | Francis Field; St. Louis, MO | W 28–0 | 3,000 | |
| November 21 | Missouri^{†} | Memorial Stadium; Lawrence, KS (rivalry) | W 14–0 | 20,567 | |
| December 5 | at Washburn* | Moore Bowl; Topeka, KS | W 6–0 | 3,500 | |
*Non-conference game; ^{†}Homecoming
