= 1931 Tulsa Golden Hurricane football team =

American college football season

1931 Tulsa Golden Hurricane football
- Conference: Big Four Conference
- Record: 8–3 (2–1 Big Four)
- Head coach: Gus Henderson (7th season)
- Home stadium: Skelly Field

1931 Big Four Conference (Oklahoma) football standings
	Conf.					Overall
Team	W		L		T	W		L		T
Oklahoma City $	3	–	0	–	0	12	–	0	–	0
Tulsa	2	–	1	–	0	8	–	3	–	0
Oklahoma Baptist	1	–	2	–	0	3	–	6	–	0
Phillips	0	–	3	–	0	1	–	5	–	0
$ – Conference champion

The 1931 Tulsa Golden Hurricane football team represented the University of Tulsa during the 1931 college football season. In their seventh year under head coach Gus Henderson, the Golden Hurricane compiled an 8–3 record and outscored their opponents by a total of 256 to 55.

== Schedule ==
Date	Opponent	Site	Result	Attendance	Source
September 25	Hendrix*	Skelly Field; Tulsa, OK	W 26–0		
October 3	TCU*	Skelly Field; Tulsa, OK	W 13–0		
October 9	Oklahoma Baptist	Skelly Field; Tulsa, OK	W 25–0		
October 16	at George Washington*	Griffith Stadium; Washington, DC	W 24–7	15,000	
October 23	Creighton*	Skelly Field; Tulsa, OK	W 28–0	9,000	
October 30	at Phillips	Enid, OK	W 31–7		
November 7	Mexico University*	Skelly Field; Tulsa, OK	W 89–0		
November 14	Oklahoma A&M*^{†}	Skelly Field; Tulsa, OK (rivalry)	L 6–7		
November 26	Oklahoma City	Skelly Field; Tulsa, OK	L 0–14		
December 5	Haskell*	Skelly Field; Tulsa, OK	W 6–0		
December 12	Oklahoma*	Skelly Field; Tulsa, OK	L 7–20	7,500	
*Non-conference game; ^{†}Homecoming
