= David M. Waters =

American football coach and educator (1897–1981)

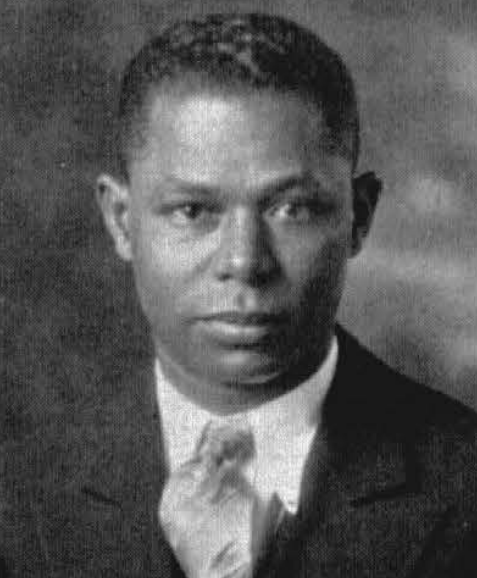
- Waters pictured in The 1930 Quill, Lincoln University yearbook

Biographical details
- Born: January 5, 1897; Savannah, Georgia, U.S.
- Died: August 4, 1981 (aged 84); Trenton, New Jersey, U.S.

Playing career

Football
- 1916–1918: Lincoln (PA)

Baseball
- c. 1918: Lincoln (PA)

Track and field
- c. 1916–1919: Lincoln (PA)
- Positions: Quarterback (football); Center fielder (baseball)

Coaching career (HC unless noted)

Football
- 1927: North Carolina College
- 1929–1931: Lincoln (MO)

Basketball
- 1929–1930: North Carolina College

Administrative career (AD unless noted)
- 1927–?: North Carolina Central

Head coaching record
- Overall: 13–8–4 (football)

David M. Waters (January 5, 1897 – August 4, 1981) was an American college football and college basketball coach and educator. He served as the head football coach at the North Carolina College for Negroes—now known as North Carolina Central University–in Durham, North Carolina, for one season, in 1927, and Lincoln University in Jefferson City, Missouri from 1929 to 1931.

Waters was born in Savannah, Georgia. He attended Lincoln University in Lower Oxford Township, Pennsylvania, where he played football as a quarterback from 1916 to 1918. He also played baseball at Lincoln as a center fielder, and competed in track and field for four years, captaining the 1919 team. He then coached at Georgia State College—now known as Savannah State University—before being hired as the head football coach at North Carolina College in 1927. He was also the athletic director at North Carolina College.

Waters earned a master's degree in education from Columbia University. In the 1930s, he was professor at Southern University in Baton Rouge, Louisiana. Waters later taught for 27 years in Trenton, New Jersey. He died on August 4, 1981, at Mercer Medical Center in Trenton.

== Head coaching record ==
=== Football ===
Year	Team	Overall	Conference	Standing	Bowl/playoffs
North Carolina College Eagles (Independent) (1927)
1927	North Carolina College	4–2–1			
North Carolina College:		4–2–1			
Lincoln Blue Tigers (Independent) (1929–1931)
1929	Lincoln	3–2–1			
1930	Lincoln	1–4			
1931	Lincoln	5–0–1			
Lincoln:		9–6–2			
Total:		13–8–4			
