= 1931 DePaul Blue Demons football team =

American college football season

1931 DePaul Blue Demons football
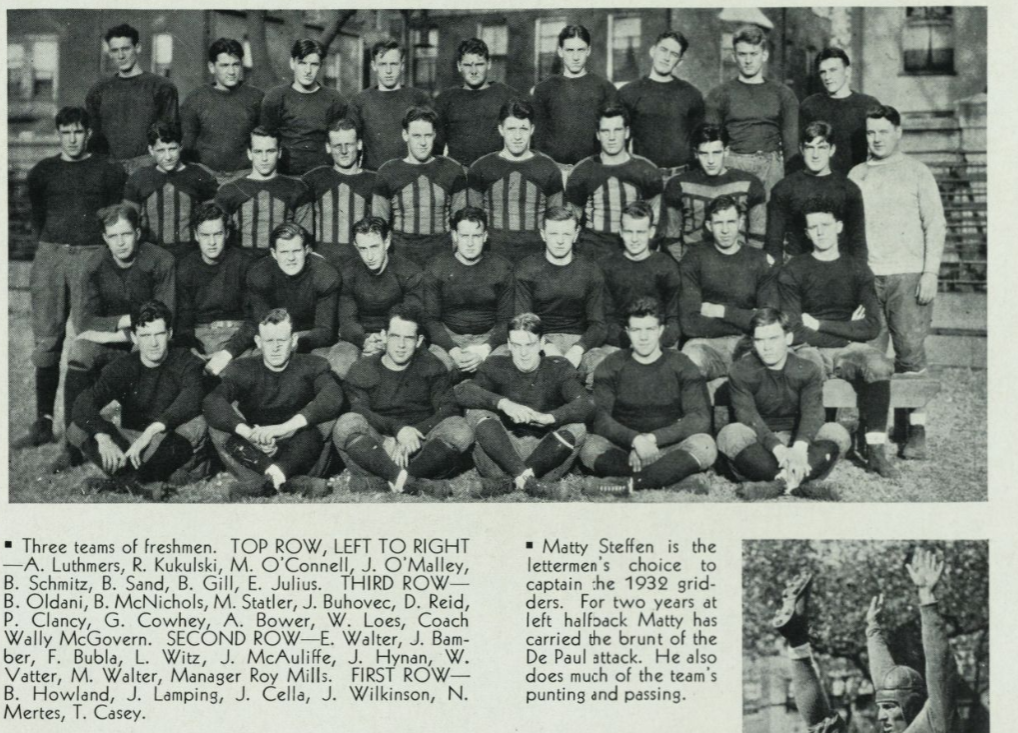
- Conference: Independent
- Record: 6–3
- Head coach: Eddie Anderson (7th season)
- Home stadium: Mills Stadium, Soldier Field

1931 Midwestern college football independents records
	Conf.			Overall
Team	W	L	T	W		L		T
Wilberforce		–		8	–	0	–	0
Marquette		–		8	–	1	–	0
Saint Louis		–		8	–	1	–	0
Detroit		–		7	–	2	–	1
Western State Teachers		–		5	–	2	–	0
No. 11 Notre Dame		–		6	–	2	–	1
DePaul		–		6	–	3	–	0
Michigan State		–		5	–	3	–	1
Haskell		–		6	–	4	–	0
Michigan Tech		–		3	–	2	–	0
Michigan State Normal		–		3	–	2	–	1
Central State (MI)		–		4	–	3	–	0
John Carroll		–		4	–	4	–	2
Wittenberg		–		3	–	3	–	3
Kent State		–		3	–	4	–	0
Rankings from Dickinson System

The 1931 DePaul Blue Demons football team was an American football team that represented DePaul University as an independent during the 1931 college football season. In its seventh and final season under head coach Eddie Anderson, the team compiled a 6–3 record and outscored opponents by a total of 176 to 121.

Anderson went on to coach at Holy Cross and Iowa and was inducted into the College Football Hall of Fame in 1971.

== Schedule ==
Date	Opponent	Site	Result	Attendance	Source
September 22	at Detroit	Dinan Field; Detroit, MI	W 12–0	> 15,000	
October 2	at North Dakota	Memorial Stadium; Grand Forks, ND	L 7–41		
October 9	Illinois Wesleyan	Mills Stadium; Chicago, IL	W 6–2	8,000	
October 16	Saint Mary's (MN)	Chicago, IL	W 20–6	5,000	
October 24	Hastings	Soldier Field; Chicago, IL	W 31–0		
November 7	at Louisville	Maxwell Field; Louisville, KY	W 46–0		
November 14	South Dakota State^{†}	Chicago, IL	W 34–20	15,000	
November 21	at Arizona	Arizona Stadium; Tucson, AZ	L 13–14		
November 28	at San Francisco	Kezar Stadium; San Francisco, CA	L 7–38	5,000–20,000	
^{†}Homecoming
