= 1931 Drake Bulldogs football team =

American college football season

1931 Drake Bulldogs football

MVC champion
- Conference: Missouri Valley Conference
- Record: 5–6 (3–0 MVC)
- Head coach: Ossie Solem (11th season)
- Home stadium: Drake Stadium

1931 Missouri Valley Conference football standings
	Conf.					Overall
Team	W		L		T	W		L		T
Drake $	3	–	0	–	0	5	–	6	–	0
Oklahoma A&M	1	–	0	–	0	8	–	2	–	1
Creighton	2	–	2	–	0	4	–	5	–	0
Grinnell	1	–	2	–	0	5	–	3	–	0
Washington University	0	–	3	–	0	2	–	7	–	0
$ – Conference champion

The 1931 Drake Bulldogs football team was an American football team that represented Drake University in the Missouri Valley Conference (MVC) during the 1931 college football season. In its 11th season under head coach Ossie Solem, the team compiled a 5–6 record (3–0 against MVC opponents), won the MVC championship, and was outscored by a total of 226 to 130.

== Schedule ==
Date	Opponent	Site	Result	Attendance	Source
October 3	Simpson*	Drake Stadium; Des Moines, IA	W 26–0	10,000	
October 9	Creighton	Drake Stadium; Des Moines, IA	W 19–6	12,000	
October 17	at Notre Dame*	Notre Dame Stadium; Notre Dame, IN	L 0–63	23,835	
October 24	at Fordham*	Polo Grounds; New York, NY	L 0–46	10,000	
October 31	at Washington University	Francis Field; St. Louis, MO	W 26–0	1,500	
November 6	Missouri*	Drake Stadium; Des Moines, IA	L 20–32		
November 14	at Iowa State*	State Field; Ames, IA	W 7–6	8,472	
November 21	Grinnell^{†}	Drake Stadium; Des Moines, IA	W 6–0	7,000	
November 26	Marquette*	Drake Stadium; Des Moines, IA	L 6–32		
December 5	at Loyola (CA)*	Wrigley Field; Los Angeles, CA	L 7–22		
December 19	at Hawaii*	Honolulu Stadium; Honolulu, Territory of Hawaii	L 13–19	7,000	
*Non-conference game; ^{†}Homecoming
