= 1931 Oklahoma Sooners football team =

American college football season

1931 Oklahoma Sooners football
- Conference: Big Six Conference
- Record: 4–7–1 (1–4 Big 6)
- Head coach: Adrian Lindsey (5th season)
- Captain: Guy Warren
- Home stadium: Memorial Stadium

1931 Big Six Conference football standings
	Conf.					Overall
Team	W		L		T	W		L		T
Nebraska $	5	–	0	–	0	8	–	2	–	0
Iowa State	3	–	1	–	0	5	–	3	–	0
Kansas State	3	–	2	–	0	8	–	2	–	0
Kansas	1	–	3	–	0	5	–	5	–	0
Missouri	1	–	4	–	0	2	–	8	–	0
Oklahoma	1	–	4	–	0	4	–	7	–	1
$ – Conference champion

The 1931 Oklahoma Sooners football team represented the University of Oklahoma in the 1931 college football season. In their fifth year under head coach Adrian Lindsey, the Sooners compiled a 4–7–1 record (1–4 against conference opponents), finished in a tie for last place in the Big Six Conference, and were outscored by their opponents by a combined total of 108 to 88.

No Sooners received All-America honors in 1931, but guard Charles Teel received all-conference honors.

== Schedule ==
Date	Opponent	Site	Result	Attendance	Source
October 3	Rice*	Memorial Stadium; Norman, OK	W 19–6	10,000	
October 10	at Nebraska	Memorial Stadium; Lincoln, NE (rivalry)	L 0–13	9,969	
October 17	vs. Texas*	Fair Park Stadium; Dallas, TX (rivalry)	L 0–3		
October 24	at Kansas State	Memorial Stadium; Manhattan, KS	L 0–14	6,500	
October 31	Iowa State	Memorial Stadium; Norman, OK	L 12–13	4,426	
November 7	Kansas	Memorial Stadium; Norman, OK	W 10–0		
November 14	at Missouri	Memorial Stadium; Columbia, MO (rivalry)	L 0–7		
November 26	Oklahoma A&M*	Memorial Stadium; Norman, OK (Bedlam)	T 0–0		
December 5	at Oklahoma City*	Goldbug Field; Oklahoma City, OK	L 0–6	14,000	
December 12	at Tulsa*	Skelly Field; Tulsa, OK	W 20–7	7,500	
December 25	at Honolulu Town Stars*	Honolulu Stadium; Honolulu, Territory of Hawaii	L 20–39		
January 1, 1932	at Hawaii*	Honolulu Stadium; Honolulu, Territory of Hawaii	W 7–0	10,000	
*Non-conference game
