= Stanley G. Backman =

American football coach

Biographical details
- Born: November 12, 1885
- Died: March 26, 1970 (aged 84); Henderson, North Carolina, U.S.

Playing career
- 1908–1910: Ohio State

Coaching career (HC unless noted)
- 1924–1926: Georgia (freshmen)
- 1931–1933: South Dakota

Administrative career (AD unless noted)
- 1931–1935: South Dakota

Head coaching record
- Overall: 11–16–1

Stanley G. Backman (November 15, 1885 – March 26, 1970) was an American football coach, college athletics administrator, military officer, and government administrator. He served as the head football coach at the University of South Dakota from 1931 to 1933, compiling a record of 11–16–1.

A native of Cincinnati, Ohio, Backman was a three-year letter winner for the Ohio State Buckeyes football team, from 1908 to 1910. He entered the United States Army in 1917 and served during World War I as a captain in the engineers. Backman was dean of men at the University of Georgia and coached freshman football there from 1924 to 1926. During World War II, he was the commander of Manila in the Philippines, following the liberation of the city by Douglas MacArthur's forces. After the war, Backman served in occupied Germany as member of the Diplomatic Corps with the Inter-Allied Rhineland Commission. In 1946, he was nominated by United States President Harry S. Truman to be a regional director within the War Assets Administration.

Backman moved to Henderson, North Carolina, in 1954. He died at Oteen Veterans Hospital there on March 26, 1970. Backman was buried in Arlington National Cemetery.

== Head coaching record ==
Year	Team	Overall	Conference	Standing	Bowl/playoffs
South Dakota Coyotes (North Central Conference) (1931–1933)
1931	South Dakota	2–5	1–3	T–4th	
1932	South Dakota	4–5–1	1–1–1	3rd	
1933	South Dakota	5–6	1–3	T–4th	
South Dakota:		11–16–1	3–7–1		
Total:		11–16–1			
