= Harry C. Graves =

American sports coach and administrator (1899–1966)

Biographical details
- Born: April 25, 1898; Denver, Colorado, U.S.
- Died: January 3, 1966 (aged 67); Leonardtown, Maryland, U.S.

Playing career

Football
- 1918: Michigan Agricultural
- 1921–1922: Michigan Agricultural
- Position: Fullback

Coaching career (HC unless noted)

Football
- 1923: Virginia Normal
- 1924–1933: Wilberforce

Administrative career (AD unless noted)
- 1923–1924: Virginia Normal

Head coaching record
- Overall: 61–12–14 (football)

Accomplishments and honors

Championships
- 1 black college national (1931)

Harry Cornelius Graves (April 25, 1898 – January 3, 1966) was an American football and baseball coach. He served as the head football coach at Virginia Normal and Industrial Institute—now known as Virginia State University in 1923, and Wilberforce University in Wilberforce, Ohio from 1924 to 1933. His 1931 Wilberforce Green Wave football team was undefeated and recognized as a black college football national champion.

Graves played high school football in Pratt, Kansas and college football at Michigan Agricultural College—now known as Michigan State University. He succeeded Harry R. Jefferson at Wilberforce in 1924. He earned a master's degree from Ohio State University in 1933.

Graves died on January 3, 1966, at St. Mary's Hospital in Leonardtown, Maryland.

== Head coaching record ==
=== Football ===
| Year | Team | Overall | Conference | Standing | Bowl/playoffs |
|---|---|---|---|---|---|
Virginia Normal Trojans (Colored Intercollegiate Athletic Association) (1923)
| 1923 | Virginia Normal | 4–3 | 3–3 | T–4th | |
| Virginia Normal: | | 4–3 | 3–3 | | |
Wilberforce Green Wave (Independent) (1924–1933)
| 1924 | Wilberforce | 3–1–2 | | | |
| 1925 | Wilberforce | 7–2 | | | |
| 1926 | Wilberforce | 6–2 | | | |
| 1927 | Wilberforce | 5–1–2 | | | |
| 1928 | Wilberforce | 4–1–4 | | | |
| 1929 | Wilberforce | 7–1–1 | | | |
| 1930 | Wilberforce | 7–1–1 | | | |
| 1931 | Wilberforce | 8–0 | | | |
| 1932 | Wilberforce | 4–0–3 | | | |
| 1933 | Wilberforce | 6–0–1 | | | |
| Wilberforce: | | 57–9–14 | | | |
| Total: | | 61–12–14 | | | |
National championship Conference title Conference division title or championship game berth
