= Lester Watt =

American football player & coach (1894–1952)

Biographical details
- Born: April 2, 1894; Taylor County, Iowa, U.S.
- Died: January 19, 1952 (aged 57); Omaha, Nebraska, U.S.

Playing career

Football
- 1916–1918: Grinnell
- Position: Quarterback

Coaching career (HC unless noted)

Football
- 1919–1925: Argentine High School (KS)
- 1926: Theodore Roosevelt HS (IA)
- 1927–1935: Grinnell
- 1939–1941: Grinnell HS (IA)

Basketball
- 1919–1926: Argentine High School (KS)
- 1939–1942: Grinnell HS (IA)

Head coaching record
- Overall: 27–42–7 (college football)

Lester Leighton "Fuzz" Watt (April 2, 1894 – January 19, 1952) was an American football player and coach. He served as the head football coach at Grinnell College in Grinnell, Iowa from 1927 to 1935, compiling a record of 27–42–7. Watt also coached track and field and golf as Grinnell and was an assistant coach in baseball.

Watt starred in athletics in high school in Villisca, Iowa and then at Grinnell, where he played college football as a quarterback. Watt coached at Argentine High School in Kansas City, Missouri from 1919 to 1926 and then at Theodore Roosevelt High School in Des Moines, Iowa for a year before returning to Grinnell in 1927. Watt resigned from his post at Grinnell in early 1936 to enter business with the sporting goods department of L. H. Kurtz Co. In 1939, he was hired as football and basketball coach at Grinnell High School.

Watt died on January 19, 1952, at a hospital in Omaha, Nebraska.

== Head coaching record ==
=== College football ===
Year	Team	Overall	Conference	Standing
Grinnell Pioneers (Missouri Valley Conference) (1927–1935)
1927	Grinnell	0–7–1	0–5	10th
1928	Grinnell	4–3–1	1–2	3rd
1929	Grinnell	5–1–2	1–0–2	2nd
1930	Grinnell	5–4	1–2	4th
1931	Grinnell	5–3	1–2	4th
1932	Grinnell	3–4–1	1–3	6th
1933	Grinnell	0–8–1	0–3	6th
1934	Grinnell	2–7	0–2	5th
1935	Grinnell	3–5–1	1–2	T–5th
Grinnell:		27–42–7	6–21–2	
Total:		27–42–7		
