= 1931 Missouri Tigers football team =

American college football season

1931 Missouri Tigers football
- Conference: Big Six Conference
- Record: 2–8 (1–4 Big 6)
- Head coach: Gwinn Henry (9th season)
- Home stadium: Memorial Stadium

1931 Big Six Conference football standings
	Conf.					Overall
Team	W		L		T	W		L		T
Nebraska $	5	–	0	–	0	8	–	2	–	0
Iowa State	3	–	1	–	0	5	–	3	–	0
Kansas State	3	–	2	–	0	8	–	2	–	0
Kansas	1	–	3	–	0	5	–	5	–	0
Missouri	1	–	4	–	0	2	–	8	–	0
Oklahoma	1	–	4	–	0	4	–	7	–	1
$ – Conference champion

The 1931 Missouri Tigers football team was an American football team that represented the University of Missouri in the Big Six Conference (Big 6) during the 1931 college football season. The team compiled a 2–8 record (1–4 against Big 6 opponents), finished in a tie for fifth place in the Big 6, and was outscored by all opponents by a combined total of 183 to 72. Gwinn Henry was the head coach for the ninth of nine seasons. The team played its home games at Memorial Stadium in Columbia, Missouri.

The team's leading scorer was George Stuber with 18 points.

== Schedule ==
Date	Opponent	Site	Result	Attendance	Source
October 3	at Texas*	Memorial Stadium; Austin, TX	L 0–31		
October 10	Kansas State	Memorial Stadium; Columbia, MO	L 7–20		
October 17	at Colorado*	Colorado Stadium; Boulder, CO	L 7–9		
October 24	at Iowa State	State Field; Ames, IA (rivalry)	L 0–20	5,589	
October 31	Nebraska	Memorial Stadium; Columbia, MO (rivalry)	L 7–10	4,200–10,000	
November 6	at Drake*	Drake Stadium; Des Moines, IA	W 32–20		
November 14	Oklahoma	Memorial Stadium; Columbia, MO (rivalry)	W 7–0		
November 21	at Kansas	Memorial Stadium; Lawrence, KS (rivalry)	L 0–14	20,567	
November 28	vs. Temple*	Muehlebach Field; Kansas City, MO	L 6–38		
December 5	at Saint Louis*	Edward J. Walsh Memorial Stadium; St. Louis, MO	L 6–21		
*Non-conference game
