= 1931 Grinnell Pioneers football team =

American college football season

1931 Grinnell Pioneers football
- Conference: Missouri Valley Conference
- Record: 5–3 (1–2 MVC)
- Head coach: Lester Watt (5th season)
- Home stadium: Ward Field

1931 Missouri Valley Conference football standings
	Conf.					Overall
Team	W		L		T	W		L		T
Drake $	3	–	0	–	0	5	–	6	–	0
Oklahoma A&M	1	–	0	–	0	8	–	2	–	1
Creighton	2	–	2	–	0	4	–	5	–	0
Grinnell	1	–	2	–	0	5	–	3	–	0
Washington University	0	–	3	–	0	2	–	7	–	0
$ – Conference champion

The 1931 Grinnell Pioneers football team was an American football team that represented Grinnell College during the 1931 college football season as a member of the Missouri Valley Conference. In their fifth year under head coach Lester Watt, the team compiled a 5–3 record.

== Schedule ==
Date	Opponent	Site	Result	Attendance	Source
September 25	Coe*	Ward Field; Grinnell, IA	W 26–0		
October 3	at Iowa State Teachers*	Cedar Falls, IA	W 12–0		
October 10	at Cornell (IA)*	Ash Park; Mount Vernon, IA	W 6–0		
October 23	at Saint Louis*	Edward J. Walsh Memorial Stadium; St. Louis, MO	L 6–43		
October 30	Carleton*	Ward Field; Grinnell, IA	W 19–13		
November 7	Washington University	Ward Field; Grinnell, IA	W 25–0		
November 15	at Creighton	Creighton Stadium; Omaha, NE	L 0–8		
November 21	at Drake	Drake Stadium; Des Moines, IA	L 0–6	7,000	
*Non-conference game
