= 1931 Iowa State Cyclones football team =

American college football season

1931 Iowa State Cyclones football
- Conference: Big Six Conference
- Record: 5–3 (3–1 Big 6)
- Head coach: George F. Veenker (1st season)
- Captain: Robert Bowmen
- Home stadium: State Field

1931 Big Six Conference football standings
	Conf.					Overall
Team	W		L		T	W		L		T
Nebraska $	5	–	0	–	0	8	–	2	–	0
Iowa State	3	–	1	–	0	5	–	3	–	0
Kansas State	3	–	2	–	0	8	–	2	–	0
Kansas	1	–	3	–	0	5	–	5	–	0
Missouri	1	–	4	–	0	2	–	8	–	0
Oklahoma	1	–	4	–	0	4	–	7	–	1
$ – Conference champion

The 1931 Iowa State Cyclones football team represented Iowa State College of Agricultural and Mechanic Arts (later renamed Iowa State University) in the Big Six Conference during the 1931 college football season. In their first season under head coach George F. Veenker, the Cyclones compiled a 5–3 record (3–1 against conference opponents), finished in second place in the conference, and were outscored by opponents by a combined total of 74 to 72. They played their home games at State Field in Ames, Iowa.

Robert Bowmen was the team captain. Roger Bowen and Dick Grefe were selected as first-team all-conference players.

== Schedule ==
Date	Time	Opponent	Site	Result	Attendance	Source
September 26	2:00 pm	Simpson*	State Field; Ames, IA	W 6–0	4,116	
October 3	8:00 pm	at Morningside*	Stockyards Park; Sioux City, IA	W 20–6	5,500	
October 9	7:00 pm	at Detroit*	University of Detroit Stadium; Detroit, MI	L 0–20	18,000	
October 24	2:00 pm	Missouri^{†}	State Field; Ames, IA (rivalry)	W 20–0	5,589	
October 31	2:00 pm	at Oklahoma	Oklahoma Memorial Stadium; Norman, OK	W 13–12	4,426	
November 7	2:00 pm	Kansas State	State Field; Ames, IA (rivalry)	W 7–6	4,396	
November 14	2:00 pm	Drake*	State Field; Ames, IA	L 6–7	8,472	
November 21	2:00 pm	at Nebraska	Memorial Stadium; Lincoln, NE (rivalry)	L 0–23	11,977	
*Non-conference game; ^{†}Homecoming; All times are in Central time
