= Cy Kasper =

American football player and coach (1895–1991)

Biographical details
- Born: May 27, 1895; Faribault, Minnesota, U.S.
- Died: December 28, 1991 (aged 96); Bismarck, North Dakota, U.S.
- Education: Notre Dame (1921)

Playing career
- 1919–1920: Notre Dame
- 1923: Rochester Jeffersons
- Positions: Fullback, halfback

Coaching career (HC unless noted)

Football
- 1922: Faribault HS (MN)
- 1923–1924: Alfred
- 1925–1927: Columbus (SD)
- 1928–1933: South Dakota State

Basketball
- 1923–1925: Alfred

Administrative career (AD unless noted)
- 1925–1928: Columbus (SD)
- 1928–1933: South Dakota State

Head coaching record
- Overall: 48–39–4

Accomplishments and honors

Championships
- 2 SDIC (1926–1927); 1 NCC (1933)

Thomas Cyril Kasper (May 27, 1895 – December 28, 1991) was an American football player and coach. He served as the head football coach at Alfred University in Alfred, New York from 1923 to 1924, Columbus College in Chamberlain, South Dakota from 1925 to 1927, and South Dakota State University from 1928 to 1933.

Kasper played college football at the University of Notre Dame from 1919 to 1920 under head coach Knute Rockne. He originally played inter-hall football until being recommended to play varsity football by other football players. Rockne pushed Kasper to take the 1927 head coaching position at the University of Wyoming, but he headed to South Dakota State instead.

Kasper was born on May 27, 1895, in Faribault, Minnesota, where he attended Shattuck Preparatory School. He was commissioned a lieutenant in the United States Army in 1917 and served overseas during World War I with the 88th Infantry Division. During his time in the service, he played on the Camp Dodge basketball team coached by John L. Griffith and played football for the 88th Division team with Frank McCormick and Obe Wenig.

Kasper died on December 28, 1991, in Bismarck, North Dakota.

== Head coaching record ==
=== College ===
Year	Team	Overall	Conference	Standing	Bowl/playoffs
Alfred Saxons (Independent) (1923–1924)
1923	Alfred	1–7			
1924	Alfred	1–6			
Alfred:		2–13			
Columbus Mariners (South Dakota Intercollegiate Conference) (1925–1927)
1925	Columbus	5–2	4–1	3rd	
1926	Columbus	4–2–1	4–0	T–1st	
1927	Columbus	7–0	5–0	T–1st	
Columbus:		16–4–1	13–1		
South Dakota State Jackrabbits (North Central Conference) (1928–1933)
1928	South Dakota State	9–1	3–1	2nd	
1929	South Dakota State	5–4–1	2–1–1	2nd	
1930	South Dakota State	2–6–1	1–3	4th	
1931	South Dakota State	6–3	2–2	T–2nd	
1932	South Dakota State	2–5–1	1–2–1	4th	
1933	South Dakota State	6–3	4–0	1st	
South Dakota State:		30–22–3	13–9–2		
Total:		48–39–4			
National championship Conference title Conference division title or championship game berth
