= 1931 Kansas State Wildcats football team =

American college football season

1931 Kansas State Wildcats football
- Conference: Big Six Conference
- Record: 8–2 (3–2 Big 6)
- Head coach: Bo McMillin (4th season)
- Home stadium: Memorial Stadium

1931 Big Six Conference football standings
	Conf.					Overall
Team	W		L		T	W		L		T
Nebraska $	5	–	0	–	0	8	–	2	–	0
Iowa State	3	–	1	–	0	5	–	3	–	0
Kansas State	3	–	2	–	0	8	–	2	–	0
Kansas	1	–	3	–	0	5	–	5	–	0
Missouri	1	–	4	–	0	2	–	8	–	0
Oklahoma	1	–	4	–	0	4	–	7	–	1
$ – Conference champion

The 1931 Kansas State Wildcats football team was an American football team that represented Kansas State University during the 1931 college football season as a member of the Big Six Conference. In their fourth year under head coach Bo McMillin, the Wildcats compiled an overall record of 8–2, with a mark of 3–2 in conference play.

== Schedule ==
Date	Opponent	Site	Result	Attendance	Source
October 3	Pittsburg State*	Memorial Stadium; Manhattan, KS	W 28–7	4,000	
October 10	at Missouri	Memorial Stadium; Columbia, MO	W 20–7		
October 17	at Kansas	Memorial Stadium; Lawrence, KS (rivalry)	W 13–0	15,000	
October 24	Oklahoma	Memorial Stadium; Manhattan, KS	W 14–0	6,500	
October 31	at West Virginia*	Mountaineer Field; Morgantown, WV	W 19–0	10,000	
November 7	at Iowa State	State Field; Ames, IA (rivalry)	L 6–7		
November 14	Nebraska^{†}	Memorial Stadium; Manhattan, KS (rivalry)	L 3–6	12,304–14,000	
November 21	North Dakota Agricultural*	Memorial Stadium; Manhattan, KS	W 19–6		
November 26	at Washburn*	Moore Bowl; Topeka, KS	W 22–0	6,000	
December 5	at Wichita*	Wichita, KS	W 20–6	3,500	
*Non-conference game; ^{†}Homecoming
