= 1931 Nebraska Cornhuskers football team =

American college football season

1931 Nebraska Cornhuskers football

Big 6 champion
- Conference: Big Six Conference
- Record: 8–2 (5–0 Big 6)
- Head coach: Dana X. Bible (3rd season)
- Home stadium: Memorial Stadium

1931 Big Six Conference football standings
	Conf.					Overall
Team	W		L		T	W		L		T
Nebraska $	5	–	0	–	0	8	–	2	–	0
Iowa State	3	–	1	–	0	5	–	3	–	0
Kansas State	3	–	2	–	0	8	–	2	–	0
Kansas	1	–	3	–	0	5	–	5	–	0
Missouri	1	–	4	–	0	2	–	8	–	0
Oklahoma	1	–	4	–	0	4	–	7	–	1
$ – Conference champion

The 1931 Nebraska Cornhuskers football team was an American football team that represented the University of Nebraska in the Big Six Conference during the 1931 college football season. In its third season under head coach Dana X. Bible, the team compiled an 8–2 record (5–0 against conference opponents), won the Big Six championship, and outscored opponents by a total of 136 to 82. The team played its home games at Memorial Stadium in Lincoln, Nebraska.

== Before the season ==
Coach Bible was coming off his second season with the bitter taste of a humbling 4–3–2 record from 1930, Nebraska's worst in over a decade. Although his first season had brought home a league title, it now wasn't clear if that was a one-off success or if he could reproduce the feat. In addition, the coaching staff was reduced to five from the seven on staff in 1930.

== Schedule ==
Date	Time	Opponent	Site	Result	Attendance	Source
September 26	2:00 p.m.	South Dakota*	Memorial Stadium; Lincoln, NE	W 44–6	5,600	
October 3	2:00 p.m.	at Northwestern*	Dyche Stadium; Evanston, IL	L 7–19	35,000	
October 10	2:00 p.m.	Oklahoma	Memorial Stadium; Lincoln, NE (rivalry)	W 13–0	9,969	
October 24	2:00 p.m.	Kansas^{†}	Memorial Stadium; Lincoln, NE (rivalry)	W 6–0	16,517–20,000	
October 31	2:00 p.m.	at Missouri	Memorial Stadium; Columbia, MO (rivalry)	W 10–7	4,200–10,000	
November 7	2:00 p.m.	Iowa*	Memorial Stadium; Lincoln, NE (rivalry)	W 7–0	15,729	
November 14	2:00 p.m.	at Kansas State	Memorial Stadium; Manhattan, KS (rivalry)	W 6–3	12,304–14,000	
November 21	2:00 p.m.	Iowa State	Memorial Stadium; Lincoln, NE (rivalry)	W 23–0	11,977	
November 26	1:00 p.m.	at Pittsburgh*	Pitt Stadium; Pittsburgh, PA	L 0–40	25,368	
December 5	3:00 p.m.	vs. Colorado Agricultural*	DU Stadium; Denver, CO	W 20–7	12,000–15,000	
*Non-conference game; ^{†}Homecoming; All times are in Central time

== Roster ==
Adam, Jerry #46 G Bauer, Henry #74 QB; Bishop, Clair #18 G Boswell, Hubert HB; Brown, Lewis #17 QB; Campbell, Clare #51 C DeBus, Warren #29 G Durkee, Bert #25 E Ely, Lawrence #52 C Gartner, Ludwig G Gilbert, James #60 T Holmbeck, Harold #26 G Hulbert, Corwin #47 T Joy, Robert #35 E Justice, Charles #50 G Kilbourne, Bruce #16 E Koster, George #44 G Kreizinger, Everett #28 FB; Manley, Robert #14 QB	Masterson, Bernard #37 QB; Mathis, Chris #71 QB; McPherson, Forrest #33 C Miller, Jack #13 HB; Milne, James #21 E Nelson, Clarence #11 HB; Nesmith, Norris #41 E O'Brien, Gail #56 T Paul, Marvin #69 HB; Penny, Thomas Lee #23 FB; Petz, Harold #32 E Rhea, Hugh #53 T Roby, John #22 FB; Sauer, George #42 FB; Schmitt, Harold #48 E Scoggan, Warren #30 T Staab, Carlyle #70 FB; Swanson, Melvin #39 HB

== Coaching staff ==
Name	Title	First year in this position	Years at Nebraska	Alma mater
Dana X. Bible	Head coach	1929	1929–1936	Carson-Newman
Henry Schulte	Lineman Coach	1931	1919–1924, 1931–1937	Michigan
Bill Day	Centers Coach	1928	1921–1925, 1928–1931	Nebraska
Ed Weir		1929	1926, 1929–1937, 1943	Nebraska
R. G. Lehman		1928	1928–1931	
W. Harold Browne	Freshmen Coach	1930	1930–1940	

== Game summaries ==
=== South Dakota ===
South Dakota at Nebraska

Team	1	2	Total
South Dakota			6
• Nebraska			44

- Date: September 26
- Location: Memorial Stadium • Lincoln, Nebraska

It had been nine years since Nebraska had faced the Coyotes in a 66–0 trouncing, and the 1931 season was opened with a similar performance. South Dakota managed a single touchdown in the third quarter on a passing play, but the day was otherwise owned by the Cornhuskers, tuning up with 44 points of their own to advance the series to 8–1–2.

=== Northwestern ===
Nebraska at Northwestern

Team	1	2	Total
Nebraska			7
• Northwestern			19

- Date: October 3
- Location: Dyche Stadium • Evanston, Illinois

Another dormant series was revived when Nebraska traveled to Evanston for the first time ever to face Northwestern after a 29-year hiatus. The Nebraska defense successfully shut down the Wildcats after the first quarter, keeping them scoreless for the rest of the game, but the 7 points put up by the Cornhuskers on the day was not enough to overcome the 19 Northwestern points scored before being shut down by Nebraska. The series was now evened out at 1–1–0.

=== Oklahoma ===
Oklahoma at Nebraska

Team	1	2	Total
Oklahoma			0
• Nebraska			13

- Date: October 10
- Location: Memorial Stadium • Lincoln, Nebraska

The wet conditions at Lincoln prevented either team from accomplishing much throughout most of the game, but finally in the fourth quarter Nebraska found the end zone. A short time later the Cornhuskers snagged an interception and quickly converted it into another touchdown to secure the outcome of the game and advance their lead in the series to 7–2–2.

=== Kansas ===
Kansas at Nebraska

Team	1	2	Total
Kansas			0
• Nebraska			6

- Date: October 24
- Location: Memorial Stadium • Lincoln, Nebraska
- Game attendance: 20,000

Reigning conference champion Kansas brought the Cornhuskers to Lawrence with sights to avenge their only conference loss of the previous season, but Nebraska extended the futility of the Jayhawks, to sixteen straight winless games against the Cornhuskers. The game was mostly a ground affair with minimal passing, and despite the low score Nebraska held the edge for most of the day, getting fifteen first downs on the day compared to the three obtained by the Jayhawks. Nebraska now had an 18-game lead in the series, the longest of all records with other ongoing opponents, at 27–9–2.

=== Missouri ===
Nebraska at Missouri

Team	1	2	3	4	Total
• Nebraska	3	7	0	0	10
Missouri	0	0	0	7	7

- Date: October 31
- Location: Faurot Field • Columbia, Missouri

Missouri had dropped their previous two games before hosting Nebraska, and came out with a vengeance, perhaps motivated by their failure to recapture the Nebraska-Missouri Bell after numerous attempts. The Cornhuskers had to fight to scratch up their 10-point halftime lead, and were unable to score again after the break. As the game waned, the Tigers put up seven points and eventually got the ball back again. Promptly moving up to Nebraska's 1-yard line, the first Missouri attempt to score was repelled by the Cornhuskers. On 2nd and goal, the Tigers lined up for another attempt but were denied the chance as time expired before the snap. Missouri's defeat put them farther back in the series to 6–16–3.

=== Iowa ===
Iowa at Nebraska

Team	1	2	3	4	Total
Iowa	0	0	0	0	0
• Nebraska	0	0	7	0	7

- Date: November 7
- Location: Memorial Stadium • Lincoln, Nebraska

The Cornhuskers piled up three times as many first downs as Iowa, but both teams struggled to put points on the scoreboard. Nebraska's third-quarter touchdown ultimately decided the game and pushed the Cornhusker series lead to 13–7–3.

=== Kansas State ===
Nebraska at Kansas State

Team	1	2	3	4	Total
• Nebraska	0	0	0	6	6
Kansas State	0	3	0	0	3

- Date: November 14
- Location: Memorial Stadium • Manhattan, Kansas
- Game weather: Rain

Heavy rains grounded this battle in Manhattan, as Kansas State completed the only pass of the entire game, all other efforts and gains made on the ground. The Cornhuskers amassed twice as many first downs and offensive yards as the newly renamed Kansas State Wildcats, but still found themselves behind 0–3 going into the final quarter. At last, when the outcome was looking bleak, Nebraska received yet another punt and successfully returned it all the way for the winning touchdown. Nebraska's commanding series lead was extended to 14–1–1.

=== Iowa State ===
Iowa State at Nebraska

Team	1	2	Total
Iowa State			0
• Nebraska			23

- Date: November 21
- Location: Memorial Stadium • Lincoln, Nebraska
- Game attendance: 11,977

Iowa State arrived in Lincoln with three conference wins to their credit, but were shut entirely down by the smothering Cornhusker defense, unable to find the scoreboard even once on the day. The win clinched coach Bible's second league title in three years, and increased Nebraska's series lead over the Cyclones to 21–4–1.

=== Pittsburgh ===
Nebraska at Pittsburgh

Team	1	2	Total
Nebraska			0
• Pittsburgh			40

- Date: November 26
- Location: Pitt Stadium • Pittsburgh

Nebraska's trip to Pittsburgh ended up a historic defeat against a team that both coach Bible and former Cornhusker star Ed Weir praised as the best they had ever faced or seen before. Nebraska's only serious scoring threat came in the third quarter when they drew up to the Pittsburgh 5-yard line, but the Panthers held the shutout by intercepting a Cornhusker pass to prevent the score. The 0–40 loss was the most points ever scored against Nebraska, and the program's worst margin of defeat, in the entire 39-year history of Cornhusker football. The previous worst Cornhusker margin of defeat had been a 0–35 loss to Minnesota in 1905, and the previous highest points scored against them came in a 5–38 loss to Chicago in 1906. The brutal domination dealt them by Pittsburgh left the Cornhuskers 1–3–2 against the Panthers all time. Pittsburgh went on to finish the season 8–1–0 and ranked #9 nationwide by the Dickinson System.

=== Colorado A&M ===
Nebraska at Colorado Agricultural

Team	1	2	Total
• Nebraska			20
Colorado Agricultural			7

- Date: December 5
- Location: Colorado Field • Fort Collins, Colorado

Nine years had passed since Nebraska faced Colorado Agricultural, and for the first and only time in the series, the Cornhuskers traveled to Denver for this postseason charity contest scheduled between the programs. It took three quarters for the visiting Cornhuskers to turn their efforts into scores, but Nebraska finally found success and ran off 20 fourth quarter points to seal the win and remain perfect against the Aggies in three attempts.

== After the season ==
Coach Bible proved that the disappointing 1930 season was perhaps just a fluke of bad luck, by once again bringing home a conference championship, his 2nd in three years at Nebraska. The only serious blemish on the season being the defeat by Northwestern early on, as few could fault the Cornhuskers for the honorable defeat dealt by Pittsburgh, who finished 9th in the nation in the Dickinson ranking. Coach Bible's career record improved to 16–6–5 (.685), and his third squad improved the program's overall record to 236–80–25 (.729) while the perfect 1931 Big 6 slate improved Nebraska's overall conference record to 64–10–8 (.829).
