= 1931 Notre Dame Fighting Irish football team =

American college football season

1931 Notre Dame Fighting Irish football
- Tommy Yarr
- Conference: Independent
- Record: 6–2–1
- Head coach: Hunk Anderson (1st season)
- Captain: Tommy Yarr
- Home stadium: Notre Dame Stadium

1931 Midwestern college football independents records
	Conf.			Overall
Team	W	L	T	W		L		T
Wilberforce		–		8	–	0	–	0
Lincoln (MO)		–		5	–	0	–	1
Marquette		–		8	–	1	–	0
Saint Louis		–		8	–	1	–	0
Detroit		–		7	–	2	–	1
Western State Teachers		–		5	–	2	–	0
No. 11 Notre Dame		–		6	–	2	–	1
DePaul		–		6	–	3	–	0
Michigan State		–		5	–	3	–	1
Haskell		–		6	–	4	–	0
Michigan Tech		–		3	–	2	–	0
Michigan State Normal		–		3	–	2	–	1
Central State (MI)		–		4	–	3	–	0
John Carroll		–		4	–	4	–	2
Wittenberg		–		3	–	3	–	3
Kent State		–		3	–	4	–	0
Rankings from Dickinson System

The 1931 Notre Dame Fighting Irish football team represented the University of Notre Dame as an independent during the 1931 college football season, led by first-year head coach Hunk Anderson.

Following the death of head coach Knute Rockne in a plane crash on March 31, line coach Anderson was promoted on April 10.

Notre Dame entered the season on a 19-game winning streak and opened with a road win, but then had a scoreless tie with Northwestern in the second game, played at Soldier Field in Chicago. Five straight wins followed and the unbeaten string extended to 26 games, until visiting USC won by two points; the Trojans were the last team to defeat Notre Dame, three years earlier in 1928. The next week, Army shut out the Irish 12–0 at Yankee Stadium to conclude the season.

== Schedule ==
Date	Opponent	Site	Result	Attendance	Source
October 3	at Indiana	Memorial Stadium; Bloomington, IN	W 25–0	12,098–18,000	
October 10	vs. Northwestern	Soldier Field; Chicago, IL (rivalry)	T 0–0	65,000	
October 17	Drake	Notre Dame Stadium; Notre Dame, IN	W 63–0	23,835	
October 24	Pittsburgh	Notre Dame Stadium; Notre Dame, IN (rivalry)	W 25–12	37,394–42,000	
October 31	at Carnegie Tech	Pitt Stadium; Pittsburgh, PA	W 19–0	42,271	
November 7	Penn	Notre Dame Stadium; Notre Dame, IN	W 49–0	39,173	
November 14	vs. Navy	Municipal Stadium; Baltimore, MD (rivalry)	W 20–0	56,861	
November 21	USC	Notre Dame Stadium; Notre Dame, IN (rivalry)	L 14–16	50,731	
November 28	vs. Army	Yankee Stadium; Bronx, NY (rivalry)	L 0–12	78,559	
