= 1931 Creighton Bluejays football team =

American college football season

1931 Creighton Bluejays football
- Conference: Missouri Valley Conference
- Record: 4–5 (2–2 MVC)
- Head coach: Arthur R. Stark (1st season)
- Home stadium: Creighton Stadium

1931 Missouri Valley Conference football standings
	Conf.					Overall
Team	W		L		T	W		L		T
Drake $	3	–	0	–	0	5	–	6	–	0
Oklahoma A&M	1	–	0	–	0	8	–	2	–	1
Creighton	2	–	2	–	0	4	–	5	–	0
Grinnell	1	–	2	–	0	5	–	3	–	0
Washington University	0	–	3	–	0	2	–	7	–	0
$ – Conference champion

The 1931 Creighton Bluejays football team was an American football team that represented Creighton University as a member of the Missouri Valley Conference (MVC) during the 1931 college football season. In its second season under head coach Arthur R. Stark, the team compiled a 4–5 record (2–2 against MVC opponents) and was outscored by a total of 107 to 83. The team played its home games at Creighton Stadium in Omaha, Nebraska.

== Schedule ==
Date	Opponent	Site	Result	Attendance	Source
September 26	Baker*	Creighton Stadium; Omaha, NE	W 26–7	9,000	
October 3	Wyoming*	Creighton Stadium; Omaha, NE	W 3–0		
October 9	at Drake	Drake Stadium; Des Moines, IA	L 6–19	12,000	
October 17	Washington University	Creighton Stadium; Omaha, NE	W 40–0	8,000	
October 24	at Tulsa*	Skelly Field; Tulsa, OK	L 0–28	9,000	
October 30	Haskell*	Creighton Stadium; Omaha, NE	L 0–26	8,000	
November 7	at Oklahoma A&M	Lewis Field; Stillwater, OK	L 0–20	6,000	
November 14	Grinnell	Creighton Stadium; Omaha, NE	W 8–0		
November 21	at Marquette*	Marquette Stadium; Milwaukee, WI	L 0–7	7,500	
*Non-conference game
