= 1931 Washington University Bears football team =

American college football season

1931 Washington University Bears football
- Conference: Missouri Valley Conference
- Record: 2–7 (0–3 MVC)
- Head coach: Albert Sharpe (4th season)
- Home stadium: Francis Field

1931 Missouri Valley Conference football standings
	Conf.					Overall
Team	W		L		T	W		L		T
Drake $	3	–	0	–	0	5	–	6	–	0
Oklahoma A&M	1	–	0	–	0	8	–	2	–	1
Creighton	2	–	2	–	0	4	–	5	–	0
Grinnell	1	–	2	–	0	5	–	3	–	0
Washington University	0	–	3	–	0	2	–	7	–	0
$ – Conference champion

The 1931 Washington University Bears football team represented Washington University in St. Louis as a member of the Missouri Valley Conference (MVC) during the 1931 college football season. In its fourth season under head coach Albert Sharpe, the team compiled a 2–7 record.

== Schedule ==
Date	Opponent	Site	Result	Attendance	Source
September 26	William Jewell*	Francis Field; St. Louis, MO	W 6–0	2,500	
October 3	Illinois College*	Francis Field; St. Louis, MO	W 18–7		
October 10	Westminster (MO)*	Francis Field; St. Louis, MO	L 0–20	3,500	
October 17	at Creighton	Creighton Stadium; Omaha, NE	L 0–40	8,000	
October 24	Centre*	Francis Field; St. Louis, MO	L 2–14	3,500	
October 31	Drake	Francis Field; St. Louis, MO	L 0–26	1,500	
November 7	at Grinnell	Ward Field; Grinnell, IA	L 0–25		
November 14	Kansas*	Francis Field; St. Louis, MO	L 0–28	3,000	
November 26	at Saint Louis*	Edward J. Walsh Memorial Stadium; St. Louis, MO	L 0–34	11,658	
*Non-conference game
