= 1931 North Dakota Agricultural Bison football team =

American college football season

1931 North Dakota Agricultural Bison football
- Conference: North Central Conference
- Record: 5–5 (2–2 NCC)
- Head coach: Casey Finnegan (3rd season)
- Captain: Cy Lonsbrough
- Home stadium: Dacotah Field

1931 North Central Conference football standings
| | Conf. | | | | | Overall |
| Team | W | | L | | T | W | | L | | T |
|---|---|---|---|---|---|---|---|---|---|---|
| North Dakota $ | 4 | – | 0 | – | 0 | 8 | – | 1 | – | 2 |
| South Dakota State | 2 | – | 2 | – | 0 | 6 | – | 3 | – | 0 |
| North Dakota Agricultural | 2 | – | 2 | – | 0 | 5 | – | 5 | – | 0 |
| South Dakota | 1 | – | 3 | – | 0 | 2 | – | 5 | – | 0 |
| Morningside | 1 | – | 3 | – | 0 | 2 | – | 6 | – | 0 |
$ – Conference champion

The 1931 North Dakota Agricultural Bison football team was an American football team that represented North Dakota Agricultural College (now known as North Dakota State University) in the North Central Conference (NCC) during the 1931 college football season. In its third season under head coach Casey Finnegan, the team compiled a 5–5 record (2–2 against NCC opponents) and tied for second place out of five teams in the NCC. The team played its home games at Dacotah Field in Fargo, North Dakota.

== Schedule ==
| Date | Opponent | Site | Result | Attendance | Source |
|---|---|---|---|---|---|
| September 18 | Concordia (MN)* | Dacotah Field; Fargo, ND | W 19–0 | 4,000 | |
| September 26 | at Minnesota* | Memorial Stadium; Minneapolis, MN | L 7–13 | 15,000 | |
| October 3 | at Wisconsin* | Camp Randall Stadium; Madison, WI | L 7–12 | 21,000 | |
| October 9 | St. Thomas (MN)* | Dacotah Field; Fargo, ND | W 27–6 | | |
| October 16 | Morningside | Dacotah Field; Fargo, ND | W 28–0 | | |
| October 24 | South Dakota State^{†} | Dacotah Field; Fargo, ND (rivalry) | L 0–7 | | |
| October 31 | at North Dakota | Memorial Stadium; Grand Forks, ND (rivalry) | L 12–20 | | |
| November 7 | Moorhead State* | Dacotah Field; Fargo, ND | W 19–6 | | |
| November 14 | at South Dakota | Inman Field; Vermillion, SD | W 13–0 | | |
| November 21 | at Kansas State* | Memorial Stadium; Manhattan, KS | L 6–19 | | |
*Non-conference game; ^{†}Homecoming
