= 1931 South Dakota Coyotes football team =

American college football season

1931 South Dakota Coyotes football
- Conference: North Central Conference
- Record: 2–5 (1–3 NCC)
- Head coach: Stanley G. Backman (1st season)
- Home stadium: Inman Field

1931 North Central Conference football standings
	Conf.					Overall
Team	W		L		T	W		L		T
North Dakota $	4	–	0	–	0	8	–	1	–	2
South Dakota State	2	–	2	–	0	6	–	3	–	0
North Dakota Agricultural	2	–	2	–	0	5	–	5	–	0
South Dakota	1	–	3	–	0	2	–	5	–	0
Morningside	1	–	3	–	0	2	–	6	–	0
$ – Conference champion

The 1931 South Dakota Coyotes football team was an American football team that represented the University of South Dakota in the North Central Conference (NCC) during the 1931 college football season. In its first season under head coach Stanley G. Backman, the team compiled a 2–5 record (1–3 against NCC opponents), tied for last place in the NCC, and was outscored opponents by a total of 148 to 55. The team played its home games at Inman Field in Vermillion, South Dakota.

== Schedule ==
Date	Opponent	Site	Result	Attendance	Source
September 19	Yankton*	Inman Field; Vermillion, SD	W 21–6		
September 26	at Nebraska*	Memorial Stadium; Lincoln, NE	L 6–44	5,600	
October 3	Carleton*	Inman Field; Vermillion, SD	L 12–13		
October 10	vs. North Dakota	Aberdeen, SD (rivalry)	L 6–52		
October 24	at Morningside	Sioux City, IA	L 0–20		
October 31	South Dakota State	Inman Field; Vermillion, SD (rivalry)	W 10–0		
November 14	North Dakota Agricultural	Inman Field; Vermillion, SD	L 0–13		
*Non-conference game
