= 1931 Saint Louis Billikens football team =

American college football season

1931 Saint Louis Billikens football
- Conference: Independent
- Record: 8–2
- Head coach: Chile Walsh (2nd season)
- Home stadium: Edward J. Walsh Memorial Stadium

1931 Midwestern college football independents records
| | Conf. | | | Overall |
| Team | W | L | T | W | | L | | T |
|---|---|---|---|---|---|---|---|---|
| Wilberforce | | – | | 8 | – | 0 | – | 0 |
| Lincoln (MO) | | – | | 5 | – | 0 | – | 1 |
| Marquette | | – | | 8 | – | 1 | – | 0 |
| Saint Louis | | – | | 8 | – | 1 | – | 0 |
| Detroit | | – | | 7 | – | 2 | – | 1 |
| Western State Teachers | | – | | 5 | – | 2 | – | 0 |
| No. 11 Notre Dame | | – | | 6 | – | 2 | – | 1 |
| DePaul | | – | | 6 | – | 3 | – | 0 |
| Michigan State | | – | | 5 | – | 3 | – | 1 |
| Haskell | | – | | 6 | – | 4 | – | 0 |
| Michigan Tech | | – | | 3 | – | 2 | – | 0 |
| Michigan State Normal | | – | | 3 | – | 2 | – | 1 |
| Central State (MI) | | – | | 4 | – | 3 | – | 0 |
| John Carroll | | – | | 4 | – | 4 | – | 2 |
| Wittenberg | | – | | 3 | – | 3 | – | 3 |
| Kent State | | – | | 3 | – | 4 | – | 0 |
Rankings from Dickinson System

The 1931 Saint Louis Billikens football team was an American football team that represented Saint Louis University as an independent during the 1931 college football season. In their second season under head coach Chile Walsh, the Billikens compiled an 8–2 record and outscored opponents by a total of 239 to 52. The team played its home games at Edward J. Walsh Memorial Stadium in St. Louis.

== Schedule ==
| Date | Opponent | Site | Result | Attendance | Source |
|---|---|---|---|---|---|
| September 25 | Millikin | Edward J. Walsh Memorial Stadium; St. Louis, MO | W 27–0 | | |
| October 3 | at Illinois | Memorial Stadium; Champaign, IL | L 6–20 | 13,535 | |
| October 9 | Coe | Edward J. Walsh Memorial Stadium; St. Louis, MO | W 26–0 | | |
| October 16 | Missouri Mines | Edward J. Walsh Memorial Stadium; St. Louis, MO | W 7–0 | | |
| October 17 | Grinnell | Edward J. Walsh Memorial Stadium; St. Louis, MO | W 43–6 | | |
| October 30 | Oklahoma City | Edward J. Walsh Memorial Stadium; St. Louis, MO | L 13–14 | 8,500 | |
| November 6 | at Loyola (LA) | Loyola University Stadium; New Orleans, LA | W 32–0 | | |
| November 13 | Davis & Elkins | Edward J. Walsh Memorial Stadium; St. Louis, MO | W 20–6 | | |
| November 26 | Washington University | Edward J. Walsh Memorial Stadium; St. Louis, MO | W 34–0 | 11,658 | |
| December 5 | Missouri | Edward J. Walsh Memorial Stadium; St. Louis, MO | W 31–6 | | |
