= 1931 Detroit Titans football team =

American college football season

1931 Detroit Titans football
- Conference: Independent
- Record: 7–2–1
- Head coach: Gus Dorais (7th season)
- Home stadium: University of Detroit Stadium

1931 Midwestern college football independents records
	Conf.			Overall
Team	W	L	T	W		L		T
Wilberforce		–		8	–	0	–	0
Lincoln (MO)		–		5	–	0	–	1
Marquette		–		8	–	1	–	0
Saint Louis		–		8	–	1	–	0
Detroit		–		7	–	2	–	1
Western State Teachers		–		5	–	2	–	0
No. 11 Notre Dame		–		6	–	2	–	1
DePaul		–		6	–	3	–	0
Michigan State		–		5	–	3	–	1
Haskell		–		6	–	4	–	0
Michigan Tech		–		3	–	2	–	0
Michigan State Normal		–		3	–	2	–	1
Central State (MI)		–		4	–	3	–	0
John Carroll		–		4	–	4	–	2
Wittenberg		–		3	–	3	–	3
Kent State		–		3	–	4	–	0
Rankings from Dickinson System

The 1931 Detroit Titans football team represented the University of Detroit in the 1931 college football season. Detroit outscored opponents by a combined total of 112 to 71 and finished with a 7–2–1 record in their seventh year under head coach and College Football Hall of Fame inductee, Gus Dorais. Significant games included victories over Iowa State (20–0), West Virginia (9–7), and Michigan State (20–13), losses to DePaul (12–0) and Fordham (39–9), and a scoreless tie with Villanova.

== Schedule ==
Date	Opponent	Site	Result	Attendance	Source
September 22	DePaul	University of Detroit Stadium; Detroit, MI	L 0–12	> 15,000	
October 2	Western State Teachers (MI)	University of Detroit Stadium; Detroit, MI	W 20–0		
October 9	Iowa State	University of Detroit Stadium; Detroit, MI	W 20–0	18,000	
October 16	Marquette	University of Detroit Stadium; Detroit, MI	W 7–0	15,000	
October 23	West Virginia	University of Detroit Stadium; Detroit, MI	W 9–7		
October 31	Loyola (LA)	University of Detroit Stadium; Detroit, MI	W 21–0	10,000	
November 7	at Fordham	Polo Grounds; New York, NY	L 9–39		
November 14	Villanova	University of Detroit Stadium; Detroit, MI	T 0–0		
November 21	Michigan State	University of Detroit Stadium; Detroit, MI	W 20–13	19,000	
November 28	at Georgetown	Griffith Stadium; Washington, DC	W 6–0	10,000	
