= 1931 Kent State Golden Flashes football team =

American college football season

1931 Kent State Golden Flashes football
- Conference: Independent
- Record: 3–4
- Head coach: Merle E. Wagoner (7th season)
- Home stadium: Rockwell Field

1931 Midwestern college football independents records
	Conf.			Overall
Team	W	L	T	W		L		T
Wilberforce		–		8	–	0	–	0
Marquette		–		8	–	1	–	0
Saint Louis		–		8	–	1	–	0
Detroit		–		7	–	2	–	1
Western State Teachers		–		5	–	2	–	0
No. 11 Notre Dame		–		6	–	2	–	1
DePaul		–		6	–	3	–	0
Michigan State		–		5	–	3	–	1
Haskell		–		6	–	4	–	0
Michigan Tech		–		3	–	2	–	0
Michigan State Normal		–		3	–	2	–	1
Central State (MI)		–		4	–	3	–	0
John Carroll		–		4	–	4	–	2
Wittenberg		–		3	–	3	–	3
Kent State		–		3	–	4	–	0
Rankings from Dickinson System

The 1931 Kent State Golden Flashes football team was an American football team that represented Kent State College (later renamed Kent State University) during the 1931 college football season. In its seventh season under head coach Merle E. Wagoner, Kent State compiled a 3–4 record and was outscored by a total of 80 to 58.

== Schedule ==
Date	Opponent	Site	Result	Source
October 3	at Oberlin	Oberlin, OH	L 6–12	
October 10	at Akron	Buchtel Field; Akron, OH (rivalry)	L 6–12	
October 16	at Mount Union	Alliance, OH	L 0–25	
October 31	at Baldwin–Wallace	Berea, OH	L 0–31	
November 7	Capital	Rockwell Field; Kent, OH	W 33–0	
November 14	Otterbein	Rockwell Field; Kent, OH	W 6–0	
November 21	Hiram	Rockwell Field; Kent, OH	W 7–0	
