= 1931 Haskell Indians football team =

American college football season

1931 Haskell Indians football
- Conference: Independent
- Record: 6–4
- Head coach: William Henry Dietz (3rd season)
- Captain: Louis Weller
- Home stadium: Haskell Stadium

1931 Midwestern college football independents records
| | Conf. | | | Overall |
| Team | W | L | T | W | | L | | T |
|---|---|---|---|---|---|---|---|---|
| Wilberforce | | – | | 8 | – | 0 | – | 0 |
| Marquette | | – | | 8 | – | 1 | – | 0 |
| Saint Louis | | – | | 8 | – | 1 | – | 0 |
| Detroit | | – | | 7 | – | 2 | – | 1 |
| Western State Teachers | | – | | 5 | – | 2 | – | 0 |
| No. 11 Notre Dame | | – | | 6 | – | 2 | – | 1 |
| DePaul | | – | | 6 | – | 3 | – | 0 |
| Michigan State | | – | | 5 | – | 3 | – | 1 |
| Haskell | | – | | 6 | – | 4 | – | 0 |
| Michigan Tech | | – | | 3 | – | 2 | – | 0 |
| Michigan State Normal | | – | | 3 | – | 2 | – | 1 |
| Central State (MI) | | – | | 4 | – | 3 | – | 0 |
| John Carroll | | – | | 4 | – | 4 | – | 2 |
| Wittenberg | | – | | 3 | – | 3 | – | 3 |
| Kent State | | – | | 3 | – | 4 | – | 0 |
Rankings from Dickinson System

The 1931 Haskell Indians football team was an American football that represented the Haskell Institute (now known as Haskell Indian Nations University) during the 1931 college football season. In its third year under head coach William Henry Dietz, the team compiled a 6–4 record. Louis Weller was the team captain for third consecutive season.

== Schedule ==
| Date | Opponent | Site | Result | Attendance | Source |
|---|---|---|---|---|---|
| October 2 | at Kansas | Kansas Memorial Stadium; Lawrence, KS | W 6–0 | 11,000 | |
| October 13 | vs. Texas Tech | Fair Park Stadium; Dallas, TX | W 8–0 | | |
| October 16 | at Oklahoma A&M | Lewis Field; Stillwater, OK | L 0–42 | 12,000 | |
| October 23 | at Temple | Temple Stadium; Philadelphia, PA | W 6–0 | 30,000 | |
| October 30 | at Creighton | Creighton Stadium; Omaha, NE | W 26–0 | 8,000 | |
| November 7 | Kansas State Teachers | Lawrence, KS | W 26–0 | | |
| November 14 | at Oklahoma City | Goldbug Field; Oklahoma City, OK | L 6–28 | 9,000 | |
| November 21 | vs. Oglethorpe | Soldier Field; Chicago, IL | W 31–6 | 10,000 | |
| November 26 | at Xavier | Corcoran Field; Cincinnati, OH | L 6–12 | 15,805 | |
| December 5 | at Tulsa | Skelly Field; Tulsa, OK | L 0–6 | | |
