= 1931 Western State Teachers Hilltoppers football team =

American college football season

1931 Western State Teachers Hilltoppers football
- Conference: Independent
- Record: 5–2
- Head coach: Mike Gary (3rd season)
- Captain: Al Briggs

1931 Midwestern college football independents records
| | Conf. | | | Overall |
| Team | W | L | T | W | | L | | T |
|---|---|---|---|---|---|---|---|---|
| Wilberforce | | – | | 8 | – | 0 | – | 0 |
| Lincoln (MO) | | – | | 5 | – | 0 | – | 1 |
| Marquette | | – | | 8 | – | 1 | – | 0 |
| Saint Louis | | – | | 8 | – | 1 | – | 0 |
| Detroit | | – | | 7 | – | 2 | – | 1 |
| Western State Teachers | | – | | 5 | – | 2 | – | 0 |
| No. 11 Notre Dame | | – | | 6 | – | 2 | – | 1 |
| DePaul | | – | | 6 | – | 3 | – | 0 |
| Michigan State | | – | | 5 | – | 3 | – | 1 |
| Haskell | | – | | 6 | – | 4 | – | 0 |
| Michigan Tech | | – | | 3 | – | 2 | – | 0 |
| Michigan State Normal | | – | | 3 | – | 2 | – | 1 |
| Central State (MI) | | – | | 4 | – | 3 | – | 0 |
| John Carroll | | – | | 4 | – | 4 | – | 2 |
| Wittenberg | | – | | 3 | – | 3 | – | 3 |
| Kent State | | – | | 3 | – | 4 | – | 0 |
Rankings from Dickinson System

The 1931 Western State Teachers Hilltoppers football team represented Western State Teachers College (later renamed Western Michigan University) as an independent during the 1931 college football season. In their third season under head coach Mike Gary, the Hilltoppers compiled a 5–2 record and outscored their opponents, 86 to 51. Fullback Al Briggs was the team captain.

== Schedule ==
| Date | Opponent | Site | Result | Source |
|---|---|---|---|---|
| September 26 | Ferris Institute | Western State Teachers College Field; Kalamazoo, MI | W 25–0 | |
| October 2 | at Detroit | University of Detroit Stadium; Detroit, MI | L 0–20 | |
| October 10 | at Michigan "B" | Ferry Field; Ann Arbor, MI | L 0–19 | |
| October 17 | Notre Dame "B" | Western State Teachers College Field; Kalamazoo, MI | W 27–6 | |
| November 7 | at Iowa State Teachers | Cedar Falls, IA | W 14–0 | |
| November 14 | Western Kentucky State Teachers | Western State Teachers College Field; Kalamazoo, MI | W 13–0 | |
| November 21 | at Central State (MI) | Alumni Field; Mount Pleasant, MI (rivalry) | W 7–6 | |
