= 1931 Michigan State Spartans football team =

American college football season

1931 Michigan State Spartans football
- Conference: Independent
- Record: 5–3–1
- Head coach: Jim Crowley (3rd season)
- MVP: Abe Eliowitz
- Captain: Milton C. Gross
- Home stadium: College Field

1931 Midwestern college football independents records
	Conf.			Overall
Team	W	L	T	W		L		T
Wilberforce		–		8	–	0	–	0
Lincoln (MO)		–		5	–	0	–	1
Marquette		–		8	–	1	–	0
Saint Louis		–		8	–	1	–	0
Detroit		–		7	–	2	–	1
Western State Teachers		–		5	–	2	–	0
No. 11 Notre Dame		–		6	–	2	–	1
DePaul		–		6	–	3	–	0
Michigan State		–		5	–	3	–	1
Haskell		–		6	–	4	–	0
Michigan Tech		–		3	–	2	–	0
Michigan State Normal		–		3	–	2	–	1
Central State (MI)		–		4	–	3	–	0
John Carroll		–		4	–	4	–	2
Wittenberg		–		3	–	3	–	3
Kent State		–		3	–	4	–	0
Rankings from Dickinson System

The 1931 Michigan State Spartans football team represented Michigan State College as an independent during the 1931 college football season. In their third season under head coach Jim Crowley, the Spartans compiled a 5–3–1 record and played to a scoreless tie in their annual rivalry game with Michigan. In inter-sectional play, the team defeated Georgetown (6-0) and lost to Army (20-7) and Syracuse (15-7). In one of the most one-sided games in Michigan State history, the Spartans also defeated Ripon College on November 7, 1931, by a 100 to 0 score.

Quarterback Bob Monnett was selected by the Central Press Association as a first-team player on the 1931 College Football All-America Team.

== Schedule ==
Date	Opponent	Site	Result	Attendance	Source
September 26	Alma	College Field; East Lansing, MI	W 74–0		
October 3	Cornell (IA)	College Field; East Lansing, MI	W 47–0		
October 10	at Army	Michie Stadium; West Point, NY	L 7–20		
October 17	Illinois Wesleyan	College Field; East Lansing, MI	W 34–6		
October 24	Georgetown	College Field; East Lansing, MI	W 6–0		
October 31	Syracuse^{†}	College Field; East Lansing, MI	L 10–15	15,000	
November 7	Ripon	College Field; East Lansing, MI	W 100–0		
November 14	at Michigan	Michigan Stadium; Ann Arbor, MI (rivalry)	T 0–0	35,844	
November 21	at Detroit	University of Detroit Stadium; Detroit, MI	L 13–20	19,000	
^{†}Homecoming

== Game summaries ==
=== Michigan ===
Week 7: Michigan State at Michigan

Team	1	2	3	4	Total
Michigan State	0	0	0	0	0
Michigan	0	0	0	0	0

- Date: November 14, 1931
- Location: Michigan Stadium, Ann Arbor, MI

On November 14, 1931, the Spartans played the Michigan Wolverines to a scoreless tie at Michigan Stadium.
