= 1931 Michigan State Normal Hurons football team =

American college football season

1931 Michigan State Normal Hurons football
- Conference: Independent
- Record: 3–2–1
- Head coach: Elton Rynearson (10th season)
- Captain: Ken Hawk
- Home stadium: Normal Field

1931 Midwestern college football independents records
	Conf.			Overall
Team	W	L	T	W		L		T
Wilberforce		–		8	–	0	–	0
Lincoln (MO)		–		5	–	0	–	1
Marquette		–		8	–	1	–	0
Saint Louis		–		8	–	1	–	0
Detroit		–		7	–	2	–	1
Western State Teachers		–		5	–	2	–	0
No. 11 Notre Dame		–		6	–	2	–	1
DePaul		–		6	–	3	–	0
Michigan State		–		5	–	3	–	1
Haskell		–		6	–	4	–	0
Michigan Tech		–		3	–	2	–	0
Michigan State Normal		–		3	–	2	–	1
Central State (MI)		–		4	–	3	–	0
John Carroll		–		4	–	4	–	2
Wittenberg		–		3	–	3	–	3
Kent State		–		3	–	4	–	0
Rankings from Dickinson System

The 1931 Michigan State Normal Hurons football team was an American football team that represented Michigan State Normal College (later renamed Eastern Michigan University) as an independent during the 1931 college football season. In their 10th season under head coach Elton Rynearson, the Hurons compiled a 3–2–1 record and outscored their opponents by a total of 98 to 54. Ken Hawk was the team captain. The team played its home games at Normal Field on the school's campus in Ypsilanti, Michigan.

== Schedule ==
Date	Opponent	Site	Result	Attendance	Source
October 3	at Michigan	Michigan Stadium; Ann Arbor, MI	L 0–34	80,000	
October 10	Ohio State junior varsity	Ypsilanti, MI	W 27–0		
October 17	Notre Dame reserves	Alumni Field; Ypsilanti, MI	T 0–0		
October 24	Central State (MI)^{†}	Ypsilanti, MI (rivalry)	L 12–20	6,500	
November 7	at Ferris Institute	Big Rapids, MI	W 27–0		
November 13	Iowa State Teachers	Ypsilanti, MI	W 32–0		
^{†}Homecoming
