= 1931 North Dakota Fighting Sioux football team =

American college football season

1931 North Dakota Fighting Sioux football

NCC champion
- Conference: North Central Conference
- Record: 8–1–2 (4–0 NCC)
- Head coach: Charles A. West (4th season)
- Home stadium: Memorial Stadium

1931 North Central Conference football standings
	Conf.					Overall
Team	W		L		T	W		L		T
North Dakota $	4	–	0	–	0	8	–	1	–	2
South Dakota State	2	–	2	–	0	6	–	3	–	0
North Dakota Agricultural	2	–	2	–	0	5	–	5	–	0
South Dakota	1	–	3	–	0	2	–	5	–	0
Morningside	1	–	3	–	0	2	–	6	–	0
$ – Conference champion

The 1931 North Dakota Fighting Sioux football team, also known as the Nodaks, was an American football team that represented the University of North Dakota in the North Central Conference (NCC) during the 1931 college football season. In its second year under head coach Charles A. West, the team compiled an 8–1–2 record (4–0 against NCC opponents), won the program's fourth consecutive conference championship, and outscored opponents by a total of 278 to 60.

== Schedule ==
Date	Opponent	Site	Result	Source
September 18	Gustavus Adolphus*	Memorial Stadium; Grand Forks, ND	W 46–0	
September 25	St. Olaf*	Memorial Stadium; Grand Forks, ND	W 22–0	
October 2	DePaul*	Memorial Stadium; Grand Forks, ND	W 41–7	
October 10	South Dakota	Memorial Stadium; Grand Forks, ND	W 52–6	
October 17	at South Dakota State	Brookings, SD	W 34–6	
October 24	Oregon*	Memorial Stadium; Grand Forks, ND	T 0–0	
October 31	North Dakota Agricultural	Memorial Stadium; Grand Forks, ND	W 20–12	
November 7	at St. Thomas (MN)	Saint Paul, MN	W 36–6	
November 14	at Morningside	Sioux City, IA	W 14–4	
November 21	at Duquesne*	Forbes Field; Pittsburgh, PA	L 7–13	
November 26	at George Washington*	Washington, DC	T 6–6	
*Non-conference game
