= 1931 Central State Bearcats football team =

American college football season

1931 Central State Bearcats football
- Conference: Independent
- Record: 4–3
- Head coach: George Van Bibber (1st season)
- Home stadium: Alumni Field

1931 Midwestern college football independents records
	Conf.			Overall
Team	W	L	T	W		L		T
Wilberforce		–		8	–	0	–	0
Lincoln (MO)		–		5	–	0	–	1
Marquette		–		8	–	1	–	0
Saint Louis		–		8	–	1	–	0
Detroit		–		7	–	2	–	1
Western State Teachers		–		5	–	2	–	0
No. 11 Notre Dame		–		6	–	2	–	1
DePaul		–		6	–	3	–	0
Michigan State		–		5	–	3	–	1
Haskell		–		6	–	4	–	0
Michigan Tech		–		3	–	2	–	0
Michigan State Normal		–		3	–	2	–	1
Central State (MI)		–		4	–	3	–	0
John Carroll		–		4	–	4	–	2
Wittenberg		–		3	–	3	–	3
Kent State		–		3	–	4	–	0
Rankings from Dickinson System

The 1931 Central State Bearcats football team represented Central State Teachers College, later renamed Central Michigan University, as an independent during the 1931 college football season. In their first season under head coach George Van Bibber, the Bearcats compiled a 4–3 record (2–1 against MCC opponents), held five of seven opponents to seven or fewer point, and outscored all opponents by a combined total of 95 to 58. The team defeated its in-state rival Michigan State Normal (20–12), lost to rival Western State Teachers (6–7), and also lost to Big Ten Conference champion Michigan (0–27).

Van Bibber was named Central State's head football coach in May 1931. He replaced Butch Nowack who left Central State to accept a coaching position at Indiana. Van Bibber had played football, basketball, and baseball at Purdue.

== Schedule ==
Date	Opponent	Site	Result	Attendance	Source
October 3	at Michigan	Michigan Stadium; Ann Arbor, MI	L 0–27	70,000	
October 10	Ferris Institute	Alumni Field; Mount Pleasant, MI	W 14–6		
October 24	at Michigan State Normal	Normal Field; Ypsilanti, MI (rivalry)	W 20–12	6,500	
October 31	Detroit City College	Alumni Field; Mount Pleasant, MI	W 42–0		
November 7	Alma^{†}	Alumni Field; Mount Pleasant, MI	W 13–0	3,500	
November 14	at Bowling Green	Bowling Green, OH	L 0–6		
November 21	Western State Teachers	Alumni Field; Mount Pleasant, MI (rivalry)	L 6–7		
^{†}Homecoming

== Game summaries ==
=== Michigan ===
Central State opened its 1931 season on October 3 with a 27-0 loss to Michigan. The games attracted a crowd of nearly 80,000 at Michigan Stadium. Michigan played its backup players in the game. Michigan's touchdowns were scored by halfback Jack Heston (the son of former Michigan star Willie Heston), fullback Roderick Cox (1933 NCAA champion in the hammer throw), end Ted Petoskey, and substitute halfback Herbert Schmidt. Petoskey also kicked three points after touchdown.
