= 1931 Wilberforce Green Wave football team =

American college football season

1931 Wilberforce Green Wave football

Black college national co-champion
- Conference: Independent
- Record: 8–0
- Head coach: Harry C. Graves (8th season)

1931 Midwestern college football independents records
	Conf.			Overall
Team	W	L	T	W		L		T
Wilberforce		–		8	–	0	–	0
Marquette		–		8	–	1	–	0
Saint Louis		–		8	–	1	–	0
Detroit		–		7	–	2	–	1
Western State Teachers		–		5	–	2	–	0
No. 11 Notre Dame		–		6	–	2	–	1
DePaul		–		6	–	3	–	0
Michigan State		–		5	–	3	–	1
Haskell		–		6	–	4	–	0
Michigan Tech		–		3	–	2	–	0
Michigan State Normal		–		3	–	2	–	1
Central State (MI)		–		4	–	3	–	0
John Carroll		–		4	–	4	–	2
Wittenberg		–		3	–	3	–	3
Kent State		–		3	–	4	–	0
Rankings from Dickinson System

The 1931 Wilberforce Green Wave football team was an American football team that represented Wilberforce University during the 1931 college football season. Led by head coach Harry C. Graves and assistant coach Corrothers, the team was recognized as the 1931 black college national champion. The team compiled an undefeated, untied 8–0 record and outscored opponents by a total of 201 to 30. The team secured its claim to the black college championship with its victory over Tuskegee on October 24. Tuskegee had been undefeated in 35 previous starts.

Key players included ends Ike Robinson and Pete Fouler.

== Schedule ==
Date	Time	Opponent	Site	Result	Attendance	Source
October 3		West Kentucky Industrial	Wilberforce, OH	W 62–0		
October 17		Kentucky State	Wilberforce, OH	W 24–6		
October 24	3:15 p.m.	vs. Tuskegee	Mills Stadium; Chicago, IL (Mid Western Classic)	W 15–6	11,000–15,000	
October 31		Alabama State	Wilberforce, OH	W 32–0		
November 7		at Langston	Langston, OK	W 10–6		
November 14		at Bluefield State	Bluefield, WV	W 32–0		
November 21		Lincoln (PA)^{†}	Wilberforce, OH	W 14–6		
November 26		at West Virginia State	Lakin Field; Institute, WV	W 12–6	5,000	
^{†}Homecoming; All times are in Eastern time
