= 1927 Columbia Irish football team =

American college football season

1927 Columbia Irish football
- Conference: Independent
- Record: 1–4
- Head coach: Gene Murphy (1st season)
- Home stadium: Multnomah Stadium

The 1927 Columbia Irish football team was an American football team that represented Columbia University (later renamed the University of Portland) as an independent during the 1927 college football season. In its first year under head coach Gene Murphy, the team compiled a 1–4 record. The team played its home games at Multnomah Stadium in Portland, Oregon.

== Schedule ==
Date	Opponent	Site	Result	Attendance	Source
October 8	at Linfield	McMinnville, OR	L 0–19		
October 14	Chemawa	Portland, OR	W 27–12		
October 22	at Oregon freshmen	Hayward Field; Eugene, OR	L 0–20		
October 29	Puget Sound	Portland, OR	L 0–6		
November 5	Oregon State freshmen	Portland, OR	L 0–33		
