= 1931 Columbia Irish football team =

American college football season

1931 Columbia Irish football
- Conference: Independent
- Record: 2–5
- Head coach: Gene Murphy (5th season)
- Home stadium: Multnomah Stadium

1931 Western college football independents records
	Conf.			Overall
Team	W	L	T	W		L		T
Mount St. Charles		–		6	–	0	–	0
No. 5 Saint Mary's		–		8	–	2	–	0
Loyola (CA)		–		7	–	2	–	1
San Diego Marines		–		6	–	4	–	0
Hawaii		–		3	–	2	–	1
Santa Clara		–		5	–	4	–	1
San Francisco		–		4	–	4	–	2
San Francisco State		–		2	–	3	–	3
Gonzaga		–		3	–	4	–	0
Humboldt State		–		1	–	2	–	1
Columbia (OR)		–		2	–	5	–	0
Rankings from Dickinson System

The 1931 Columbia Irish football team was an American football team that represented Columbia University (later renamed the University of Portland) as an independent during the 1931 college football season. In its fifth year under head coach Gene Murphy, the team compiled a 2–5 record. The team played its home games at Multnomah Stadium in Portland, Oregon.

== Schedule ==
Date	Opponent	Site	Result	Attendance	Source
September 25	at Puget Sound	Tacoma Stadium; Tacoma, WA	L 0–13		
October 6	Pacific (OR)	Portland, OR	L 7–12		
October 9	Grays Harbor	Portland, OR	L 0–6		
October 16	at Willamette	Sweetland Field; Salem, OR	L 0–46	4,000	
October 23	Albany	Portland, OR	W 26–7		
November 7	Whitman	Multnomah Stadium; Portland, OR	W 12–0		
November 21	vs. Southern Oregon Normal	Medford, OR	L 7–20		
