= 1931 San Francisco State Golden Gaters football team =

American college football season

1931 San Francisco State Golden Gaters football
- Conference: Independent
- Record: 2–3–3
- Head coach: Dave Cox (1st season)
- Home stadium: Ewing Field

1931 Western college football independents records
| | Conf. | | | Overall |
| Team | W | L | T | W | | L | | T |
|---|---|---|---|---|---|---|---|---|
| Mount St. Charles | | – | | 6 | – | 0 | – | 0 |
| No. 5 Saint Mary's | | – | | 8 | – | 2 | – | 0 |
| Loyola (CA) | | – | | 7 | – | 2 | – | 1 |
| San Diego Marines | | – | | 6 | – | 4 | – | 0 |
| Hawaii | | – | | 3 | – | 2 | – | 1 |
| Santa Clara | | – | | 5 | – | 4 | – | 1 |
| San Francisco | | – | | 4 | – | 4 | – | 2 |
| San Francisco State | | – | | 2 | – | 3 | – | 3 |
| Gonzaga | | – | | 3 | – | 4 | – | 0 |
| Humboldt State | | – | | 1 | – | 2 | – | 1 |
| Columbia (OR) | | – | | 2 | – | 5 | – | 0 |
Rankings from Dickinson System

The 1931 San Francisco State Golden Gaters football team represented San Francisco State Teachers College—now known as San Francisco State University—as an independent during the 1931 college football season. This was the first season for football at San Francisco State. Led by first-year head coach Dave Cox, San Francisco State compiled a record of 2–3–3 and outscored its opponents 50 to 35. The team played home games at Ewing Field in San Francisco. Although the "Gator" was voted to be the mascot for the team in 1931, local newspaper articles called the team the "Golden Gaters".

== Schedule ==
| Date | Opponent | Site | Result | Source |
|---|---|---|---|---|
| September 1 | Lowell High School | Ewing Field; San Francisco, CA | T 0–0 | |
| September 12 | at Marin | Kentfield, CA | L 0–6 | |
| September 17 | at Galileo High School | Galileo Field; San Francisco, CA | L 6–13 | |
| September 26 | at Stanford freshmen | Stanford Stadium; Stanford, CA | T 0–0 | |
| October 9 | Continuation High School* | Ewing Field; San Francisco, CA | W 25–0 | |
| October 16 | Berkeley High School* | Ewing Field; San Francisco, CA | L 0–2 | |
| October 24 | at Humboldt State* | Albee Stadium; Eureka, CA | T 7–7 | |
| October 31 | Salinas* | Ewing Field; San Francisco, CA | W 12–7 | |
*Non-conference game
