= 1928 Columbia Irish football team =

American college football season

1928 Columbia Irish football
- Conference: Independent
- Record: –
- Head coach: Gene Murphy (2nd season)
- Home stadium: Multnomah Stadium

The 1928 Columbia Irish football team was an American football team that represented Columbia University (later renamed the University of Portland) as an independent during the 1928 college football season. In its second year under head coach Gene Murphy, the team compiled a – record. team played its home games at Multnomah Stadium in Portland, Oregon.

== Schedule ==
Date	Opponent	Site	Result	Attendance	Source
October 12	Oregon State	Multnomah Field; Portland, OR	L 0–41		
October 26	at Albany	Central School Field; Albany, OR	W 33–0		
November 4	at Oregon Normal	Monmouth, OR	W 40–13		
November 11	at Coos Bay Independents	Golden Field; Coos Bay, OR	W 12–0		
