= Gonzaga University Bulldog Band =

College pep band in Spokane, Washington

- School: Gonzaga University
- Location: Spokane, Washington, U.S.
- Conference: Pac-12 Conference
- Founded: 1928; 98 years ago (original); 1994; 32 years ago (re-established)
- Director: Christopher "Toph" Parkin
- Members: 100+
- Fight song: "Go, Gonzaga!"
- Website: www.gonzaga.edu/college-of-arts-sciences/departments/music/bulldog-band

The Gonzaga University Bulldog Band is the pep band of Gonzaga University. With over 100 members, the Bulldog Band primarily supports the Gonzaga Bulldogs men's and women's basketball teams of the Pac-12 Conference. The band is one of the most unique in the Pac-12, representing Gonzaga University, the conference's only full member that does not sponsor football.

== Before the modern Bulldog Band ==
One of the earliest versions of a Gonzaga pep band was formed by the 1920s, evidenced by a concert performance advertised in a March 22, 1928, edition of The Spokesman-Review. It was led by Walter Orion. An October 25, 1929, edition of the Spokane Daily Chronicle specifically mentions the band performing at a sporting event, a football game between Gonzaga and Mt. St. Charles.

More evidence for the Bulldog Band prior to its current iteration can be found in a January 14, 1931, edition of the Spokane Daily Chronicle. It was sponsored by Gonzaga graduate manager (a role similar to that of the modern athletic director) Bill Mulligan. Still called a "pep band", it consisted of nine members and this time was organized by Hal Matney, a freshman football player on the Gonzaga Bulldogs football team. By 1938, the band was directed by George Paul Lucas. The band was likely suspended along with the football team after the 1941 season, due to a shortage of musicians and World War II.

The band was revived in the fall of 1948, organized under Robert B. Campbell. Campbell was a director of marine corps bands and a former student director of the University of Idaho's pep band. He also a staff musician at KXLY and KHQ, and taught at Central Valley High School in Spokane Valley, Washington. By 1951, the pep band was under the direction of Dave Harry.

== Rebirth ==
The modern Bulldog Band began in 1994, founded by students Shawn McGinn, Shawn Griggs, and Sean McKenzie. David Fague, former director of the Bulldog Band, originally joined the band as a freshman in 1996.

== Directors ==
Directors of the Bulldog Band
Director	Years	Length of Direction
David Fague	2004-2024	20 years
Christopher Parkin	2024-	

== Repertoire ==
=== "Go, Gonzaga!" ===
"Go, Gonzaga!" is the fight song of the university. It was composed in 2010 by former Bulldog Band director David Fague and alumnus Kevin Laxar. For 75 years prior, Gonzaga used the Washington and Lee Swing as its fight song. Lyrics for that fight song were written for Gonzaga's now-defunct football team, and were adapted to basketball in 1988. The fight song was never used consistently, however, and according to director David Fague, felt "generic and borrowed" as dozens of other high schools and colleges also use the song.

== Travel ==
The Bulldog Band travels extensively, primarily due to the immense success of the Gonzaga Bulldogs men's basketball team. With 27 consecutive March Madness appearances since 1999, the Bulldog Band has appeared in over 70 NCAA Tournament games; more than all other Pac-12 Conference pep bands.

The band also regularly traveled to the WCC men's basketball tournament and women's basketball tournament. It will presumably continue travel to the new Pac-12 tournaments as the Gonzaga Bulldogs athletic teams begin competition in the conference in 2026.
