= Gene Murphy =

Gene Murphy may refer to:

- Gene Murphy (American football, born 1939) (1939–2011), American football player and coach
- Gene Murphy (American football, born c. 1900) (c. 1900–1976), American football player and coach
