= 1931 Colorado College Tigers football team =

American college football season

1931 Colorado College Tigers football
- Conference: Rocky Mountain Conference
- Record: 4–4 (4–3 RMC)
- Head coach: William T. Van de Graaff (6th season)
- Home stadium: Washburn Field

1931 Rocky Mountain Conference football standings
	Conf.					Overall
Team	W		L		T	W		L		T
Utah $	6	–	0	–	0	7	–	2	–	0
Utah State	5	–	2	–	0	6	–	2	–	0
Colorado Agricultural	5	–	2	–	0	5	–	4	–	0
Colorado	3	–	2	–	0	5	–	3	–	0
Wyoming	3	–	2	–	0	6	–	4	–	0
Colorado College	4	–	3	–	0	4	–	4	–	0
BYU	2	–	3	–	0	4	–	4	–	0
Denver	3	–	5	–	0	4	–	6	–	0
Colorado Teachers	2	–	4	–	1	2	–	4	–	1
Colorado Mines	0	–	4	–	1	1	–	5	–	1
Western State (CO)	1	–	5	–	0	1	–	6	–	0
Montana State	0	–	2	–	0	1	–	5	–	1
$ – Conference champion

The 1931 Colorado College Tigers football team was an American football team that represented Colorado College as a member of the Rocky Mountain Conference (RMC) during the 1931 college football season. In its sixth year under head coach William T. Van de Graaff, the team compiled an overall record of 4–4 with a mark of 4–3 in conference play, placing sixth in the RMC.

== Schedule ==
Date	Opponent	Site	Result	Attendance	Source
September 26	Western State (CO)	Washburn Field; Colorado Springs, CO	W 14–3		
October 10	Colorado Agricultural	Washburn Field; Colorado Springs, CO	L 6–32		
October 17	Colorado Teachers	Washburn Field; Colorado Springs, CO	W 9–7	1,000	
October 31	at Army*	Michie Stadium; West Point, NY	L 0–27		
November 7	Utah^{†}	Washburn Field; Colorado Springs, CO	L 6–28	5,000	
November 14	at Denver	DU Stadium; Denver, CO	W 9–2		
November 21	at Colorado	Colorado Stadium; Boulder, CO	L 7–17		
November 26	Colorado Mines	Washburn Field; Colorado Springs, CO	W 20–7		
*Non-conference game; ^{†}Homecoming
