= 1931 Utah State Aggies football team =

American college football season

1931 Utah State Aggies football
- Conference: Rocky Mountain Conference
- Record: 6–2 (5–2 RMC)
- Head coach: Dick Romney (13th season)
- Home stadium: Aggie Stadium

1931 Rocky Mountain Conference football standings
	Conf.					Overall
Team	W		L		T	W		L		T
Utah $	6	–	0	–	0	7	–	2	–	0
Utah State	5	–	2	–	0	6	–	2	–	0
Colorado Agricultural	5	–	2	–	0	5	–	4	–	0
Colorado	3	–	2	–	0	5	–	3	–	0
Wyoming	3	–	2	–	0	6	–	4	–	0
Colorado College	4	–	3	–	0	4	–	4	–	0
BYU	2	–	3	–	0	4	–	4	–	0
Denver	3	–	5	–	0	4	–	6	–	0
Colorado Teachers	2	–	4	–	1	2	–	4	–	1
Colorado Mines	0	–	4	–	1	1	–	5	–	1
Western State (CO)	1	–	5	–	0	1	–	6	–	0
Montana State	0	–	2	–	0	1	–	5	–	1
$ – Conference champion

The 1931 Utah State Aggies football team was an American football team that represented Utah State Agricultural College in the Rocky Mountain Conference (RMC) during the 1931 college football season. In their 13th season under head coach Dick Romney, the Aggies compiled a 6–2 record (5–2 against RMC opponents), finished second in the conference, and outscored all opponents by a total of 147 to 72.

Center John Vranes and halfback Delbert Young received first-team all-conference honors in 1931.

== Schedule ==
Date	Opponent	Site	Result	Attendance	Source
September 26	Montana Mines*	Aggie Stadium; Logan, UT	W 58–0		
October 3	Montana State	Aggie Stadium; Logan, UT	W 21–6		
October 10	Western State (CO)	Aggie Stadium; Logan, UT	W 38–20		
October 17	Denver^{†}	Aggie Stadium; Logan, UT	W 12–6		
October 24	at Wyoming	Corbett Field; Laramie, WY (rivalry)	W 12–0	4,500	
November 7	vs. BYU	Ogden Stadium; Ogden, UT (rivalry)	L 0–6	5,000	
November 14	at Colorado Agricultural	Colorado Field; Fort Collins, CO	W 6–0		
November 26	at Utah	Ute Stadium; Salt Lake City, UT (rivalry)	L 0–34		
*Non-conference game; ^{†}Homecoming
