= 1931 San Francisco Grey Fog football team =

American college football season

1931 San Francisco Gray Fog football
- Conference: Independent
- Record: 4–4–2
- Head coach: Jimmy Needles (8th season)
- Home stadium: Kezar Stadium; Seals Stadium

1931 Western college football independents records
| | Conf. | | | Overall |
| Team | W | L | T | W | | L | | T |
|---|---|---|---|---|---|---|---|---|
| Mount St. Charles | | – | | 6 | – | 0 | – | 0 |
| No. 5 Saint Mary's | | – | | 8 | – | 2 | – | 0 |
| Loyola (CA) | | – | | 7 | – | 2 | – | 1 |
| San Diego Marines | | – | | 6 | – | 4 | – | 0 |
| Hawaii | | – | | 3 | – | 2 | – | 1 |
| Santa Clara | | – | | 5 | – | 4 | – | 1 |
| San Francisco | | – | | 4 | – | 4 | – | 2 |
| San Francisco State | | – | | 2 | – | 3 | – | 3 |
| Gonzaga | | – | | 3 | – | 4 | – | 0 |
| Humboldt State | | – | | 1 | – | 2 | – | 1 |
| Columbia (OR) | | – | | 2 | – | 5 | – | 0 |
Rankings from Dickinson System

The 1931 San Francisco Grey Fog football team was an American football team that represented the University of San Francisco as an independent during the 1931 college football season. In their eighth and final season under head coach Jimmy Needles, the Grey Fog compiled a 4–4–2 record and outscored opponents by a combined total of 155 to 87.

== Schedule ==
| Date | Opponent | Site | Result | Attendance | Source |
|---|---|---|---|---|---|
| September 25 | BYU | Seals Stadium; San Francisco, CA | W 25–0 | 20,000 | |
| October 4 | West Coast Army | Kezar Stadium; San Francisco, CA | T 6–6 | | |
| October 18 | Saint Mary's | Kezar Stadium; San Francisco, CA | L 6–14 | 50,000 | |
| October 24 | at Loyola (CA) | Wrigley Field; Los Angeles, CA | L 6–7 | 10,000 | |
| October 31 | Olympic Club | Kezar Stadium; San Francisco, CA | T 7–7 | < 1,000 | |
| November 8 | at Gonzaga | Spokane, WA | L 6–21 | | |
| November 15 | Santa Clara | Kezar Stadium; San Francisco, CA | W 7–0 | 12,000 | |
| November 21 | at Nevada | Mackay Field; Reno, NV | W 40–7 | | |
| November 29 | DePaul | Kezar Stadium; San Francisco, CA | W 38–7 | 5,000–20,000 | |
| December 9 | at Hawaii | Honolulu Stadium; Honolulu, Territory of Hawaii | L 14–18 | 8,000 | |
