= 1931 Arizona State Bulldogs football team =

American college football season

1931 Arizona State Bulldogs football

Border champion
- Conference: Border Conference
- Record: 6–2 (3–0 Border)
- Head coach: Ted Shipkey (2nd season)
- Captain: Horace Smitheran
- Home stadium: Irish Field

1931 Border Conference football standings
	Conf.					Overall
Team	W		L		T	W		L		T
Arizona State $	3	–	0	–	0	6	–	2	–	0
New Mexico	1	–	1	–	1	3	–	3	–	1
Arizona	1	–	1	–	1	3	–	5	–	1
New Mexico A&M	1	–	2	–	0	6	–	4	–	0
Arizona State–Flagstaff	1	–	3	–	0	3	–	5	–	0
$ – Conference champion; Arizona State and Arizona State–Flagstaff played twice, but only the first meeting counted in the conference standings.

The 1931 Arizona State Bulldogs football team was an American football team that represented Arizona State Teachers College (later renamed Arizona State University) in the Border Conference during the 1931 college football season. In their second season under head coach Ted Shipkey, the Bulldogs compiled a 6–2 record with a mark of 3–0 in conference play, won the Border Conference championship, and outscored opponents 169 to 66. The team captain was fullback Horace Smitheran. The Bulldogs finished 4–1 at home and 2–1 on the road. Home games were played at Irish Field in Tempe, Arizona.

== Schedule ==
Date	Opponent	Site	Result	Source
September 26	Sacaton Indians*	Irish Field; Tempe, AZ	W 66–0	
October 3	at Texas Mines*	El Paso HS Stadium; El Paso, TX	L 13–27	
October 17	New Mexico A&M	Irish Field; Tucson, AZ	W 25–7	
October 24	at Arizona State–Flagstaff	Skidmore Field; Flagstaff, AZ	W 20–6	
October 31	Arizona	Irish Field; Tucson, AZ (Territorial Cup)	W 19–6	
November 11	at Fresno State*	Fresno State College Stadium; Fresno, CA	W 7–0	
November 21	Arizona State–Flagstaff (Note: The second game between Arizona State and Arizona State–Flagstaff did not count in the Border Conference standings.)*	Irish Field; Tempe, AZ	L 6–13	
November 28	Arizona All-Stars*	Irish Field; Tempe, AZ	W 13–7	
*Non-conference game

== Roster ==
The usual Arizona State lineup included left end Wilburn Dick, left tackle Cecil McCullar, left guard Earl McCullar, center Reid Calicoat, right guard Paul Griffin, right tackle Don Pace, right end Bob Smith, quarterback Howard "Curley" Blount, halfbacks Norris Steverson and Bill Baxter, and fullback Horace Smitheran.

Bob Adams, Guideo Cislaghi, Norman Clements, Ben Cole, Anson Cooper, and Howard Curry were also on the roster.

== Awards and honors ==
Halfback Norris Steverson earned Associated Press (AP) All-American honorable mention honors for the 1931 football season.

Steverson, right guard Paul Griffin, and left end Dick Wilburn earned All-Southern Conference honors for the 1931 campaign.
