= 1931 Chico State Wildcats football team =

American college football season

1931 Chico State Wildcats football
- Conference: Far Western Conference
- Record: 3–4–1 (2–1–1 FWC)
- Head coach: Art Acker (9th season)
- Home stadium: College Field

1931 Far Western Conference football standings
	Conf.					Overall
Team	W		L		T	W		L		T
Pacific (CA)	2	–	1	–	2	5	–	2	–	2
Cal Aggies	2	–	1	–	2	4	–	2	–	2
Chico State	2	–	1	–	1	3	–	4	–	1
Nevada	2	–	1	–	1	2	–	5	–	2
Fresno State	3	–	2	–	0	4	–	6	–	0
San Jose State	0	–	5	–	0	1	–	8	–	0
No champion was named for the 1931 season.

The 1931 Chico State Wildcats football team represented Chico State Teachers College—now known as California State University, Chico—as a member of the Far Western Conference (FWC) during the 1931 college football season. Led by ninth-year head coach Art Acker, Chico State compiled an overall record of 3–4–1 with a mark of 2–1–1 in conference play, placing in a four-way tie for first in the FWC. No champion was named for the 1931 season. The team was outscored by its opponents 107 to 62 for the season. The Wildcats played home games at College Field in Chico, California.

== Schedule ==
Date	Opponent	Site	Result	Attendance	Source
October 10	Menlo*	College Field; Chico, CA	W 13–3		
October 17	Oregon Normal*	College Field; Chico, CA	L 12–19		
October 23	at Pacific (CA)	Baxter Stadium; Stockton, CA	L 6–27		
October 31	San Jose State	College Field; Chico, CA	W 7–0		
November 11	Southern Oregon Normal*	College Field; Chico, CA	L 6–20		
November 20	Fresno State	College Field; Chico, CA	W 18–6		
November 26	at Cal Aggies	Sacramento Stadium; Sacramento, CA	T 0–0		
December 5	at Sacramento*	Sacramento Stadium; Sacramento, CA	L 0–32	2,000	
*Non-conference game
