= 1931 Cal Poly Mustangs football team =

American college football season

1931 Cal Poly Mustangs football
- Conference: Northern California Junior College Conference
- Record: 3–5–1 (3–2 NCJCC)
- Head coach: Al Agosti (10th season)

1931 Northern California Junior College Conference football standings
	Conf.					Overall
Team	W		L		T	W		L		T
Sacramento $	4	–	0	–	0	?	–	?	–	?
San Mateo	5	–	1	–	0	?	–	?	–	?
Cal Poly	3	–	2	–	0	3	–	5	–	1
Menlo	2	–	2	–	1	?	–	?	–	?
Santa Rosa	1	–	3	–	0	?	–	?	–	?
Marin	1	–	4	–	0	?	–	?	–	?
Modesto	0	–	4	–	1	?	–	?	–	?
$ – Conference champion

The 1931 Cal Poly Mustangs football team represented California Polytechnic School—now known as California Polytechnic State University, San Luis Obispo—as a member of the Northern California Junior College Conference (NCJCC) during the 1931 junior college football season. Led by tenth-year head coach Al Agosti, Cal Poly compiled an overall record of record of 3–5–1, with a mark of 3–2 in conference play, placing third in the NCJCC. The team was outscored by its opponents 152 to 51 for the season. The Mustangs played home games in San Luis Obispo, California.

Cal Poly was a two-year school until 1941. The Mustangs did not field a team in 1930 due to a polio epidemic.

== Schedule ==
Date	Time	Opponent	Site	Result	Source
September 26		Santa Maria*	San Luis Obispo, CA	T 6–6	
October 3	2:30 p.m.	at Moran Junior College (Note: Moran Junior College was founded in 1914 in Bainbridge Island, Washington. A satellite campus was opened in 1928 in Atascadero, California. Records show that the California site fielded football teams from 1929 to 1935. The Washington campus closed in 1935 and the California campus closed shortly thereafter.)*	Atascadero, CA	L 0–21	
October 9		at Santa Barbara State*	Peabody Stadium; Santa Barbara, CA	L 0–13	
October 17	2:15 p.m.	Santa Rosa^{†}	San Luis Obispo, CA	W 13–0	
October 24	1:45 p.m.	San Mateo	San Luis Obispo, CA	L 0–13	
October 30		at Bakersfield*	Griffith Field; Bakersfield, CA	L 6–45	
November 6		at Taft*	Taft, CA	W 13–6	
November 11		at Marin	San Rafael, CA	W 13–12	
November 20	2:15 p.m.	at Menlo	Menlo Park field; Atherton, CA	L 0–26	
*Non-conference game; ^{†}Homecoming; All times are in Pacific time
