= 1931 Arizona Wildcats football team =

American college football season

1931 Arizona Wildcats football
- Conference: Border Conference
- Record: 3–5–1 (1–1–1 Border)
- Head coach: Fred Enke (1st season)
- Captain: Horace Collier
- Home stadium: Arizona Stadium

1931 Border Conference football standings
| | Conf. | | | | | Overall |
| Team | W | | L | | T | W | | L | | T |
|---|---|---|---|---|---|---|---|---|---|---|
| Arizona State $ | 3 | – | 0 | – | 0 | 6 | – | 2 | – | 0 |
| New Mexico | 1 | – | 1 | – | 1 | 3 | – | 3 | – | 1 |
| Arizona | 1 | – | 1 | – | 1 | 3 | – | 5 | – | 1 |
| New Mexico A&M | 1 | – | 2 | – | 0 | 6 | – | 4 | – | 0 |
| Arizona State–Flagstaff | 1 | – | 3 | – | 0 | 3 | – | 5 | – | 0 |
$ – Conference champion; Arizona State and Arizona State–Flagstaff played twice, but only the first meeting counted in the conference standings.

The 1931 Arizona Wildcats football team represented the University of Arizona in the Border Conference during the 1931 college football season. In their first and only season under head coach Fred Enke, the Wildcats compiled a 3–5–1 record (1–1–1 against Border opponents), finished third in the conference, and were outscored by their opponents, 149 to 72. The team captain was Horace Collier. The team played its home games at Arizona Stadium in Tucson, Arizona.

== Schedule ==
| Date | Opponent | Site | Result | Attendance | Source |
|---|---|---|---|---|---|
| September 26 | San Diego State* | Arizona Stadium; Tucson, AZ | L 0–8 | | |
| October 3 | Pomona* | Arizona Stadium; Tucson, AZ | W 19–0 | | |
| October 9 | at Oklahoma A&M* | Lewis Field; Stillwater, OK | L 0–31 | | |
| October 23 | Rice*^{†} | Arizona Stadium; Tucson, AZ | L 0–32 | 4,000 | |
| October 31 | at Arizona State | Irish Field; Tempe, AZ (rivalry) | L 6–19 | > 3,000 | |
| November 7 | Arizona State–Flagstaff | Arizona Stadium; Tucson, AZ | W 19–12 | | |
| November 14 | at New Mexico | University Field; Albuquerque, NM (rivalry) | T 7–7 | | |
| November 21 | DePaul* | Arizona Stadium; Tucson, AZ | W 14–13 | | |
| November 26 | Colorado* | Arizona Stadium; Tucson, AZ | L 7–27 | 2,500 | |
*Non-conference game; ^{†}Homecoming
