= 1931 Loyola Lions football team =

American college football season

1931 Loyola Lions football
- Conference: Independent
- Record: 7–2–1
- Head coach: Tom Lieb (2nd season)
- Home stadium: Wrigley Field

1931 Western college football independents records
	Conf.			Overall
Team	W	L	T	W		L		T
Mount St. Charles		–		6	–	0	–	0
No. 5 Saint Mary's		–		8	–	2	–	0
Loyola (CA)		–		7	–	2	–	1
San Diego Marines		–		6	–	4	–	0
Hawaii		–		3	–	2	–	1
Santa Clara		–		5	–	4	–	1
San Francisco		–		4	–	4	–	2
San Francisco State		–		2	–	3	–	3
Gonzaga		–		3	–	4	–	0
Humboldt State		–		1	–	2	–	1
Columbia (OR)		–		2	–	5	–	0
Rankings from Dickinson System

The 1931 Loyola Lions football team was an American football team that represented Loyola University of Los Angeles (now known as Loyola Marymount University) as an independent during the 1931 college football season. In their second season under head coach Tom Lieb, the Lions compiled a 7–2–1 record.

== Schedule ==
Date	Opponent	Site	Result	Attendance	Source
September 26	at Pomona	Sagehen Field; Claremont, CA	W 19–0		
October 4	at West Coast Navy	San Diego, CA	T 6–6		
October 9	Whittier	Wrigley Field; Los Angeles, CA	W 21–7	6,000	
October 24	San Francisco	Wrigley Field; Los Angeles, CA	W 7–6	10,000	
October 30	Occidental	Olympic Stadium; Los Angeles, CA	W 7–6		
November 6	Santa Clara	Wrigley Field; Los Angeles, CA	L 0–6		
November 13	Caltech	Wrigley Field; Los Angeles, CA	W 21–0		
November 21	Olympic Club	Los Angeles, CA	W 13–0		
November 29	at San Diego Marines	San Diego, CA	L 0–7		
December 4	Drake	Wrigley Field; Los Angeles, CA	W 22–7		
