= 1931 Pacific Tigers football team =

American college football season

1931 Pacific Tigers football
- Conference: Far Western Conference
- Record: 5–2–2 (2–1–2 FWC)
- Head coach: Erwin Righter (11th season)
- Home stadium: Baxter Stadium

1931 Far Western Conference football standings
	Conf.					Overall
Team	W		L		T	W		L		T
Pacific (CA)	2	–	1	–	2	5	–	2	–	2
Cal Aggies	2	–	1	–	2	4	–	2	–	2
Chico State	2	–	1	–	1	3	–	4	–	1
Nevada	2	–	1	–	1	2	–	5	–	2
Fresno State	3	–	2	–	0	4	–	6	–	0
San Jose State	0	–	5	–	0	1	–	8	–	0
No champion was named for the 1931 season.

The 1931 Pacific Tigers football team represented the College of the Pacific—now known as the University of the Pacific—in Stockton, California as a member of the Far Western Conference (FWC) during the 1931 college football season. The team was led by 11th-year head coach Erwin Righter, and played home games at Baxter Stadium in Stockton. Pacific compiled an overall record of 5–2–2 with a mark of 2–1–2 in conference play, placing in a four-way tie for first in the FWC. No champion was named for the 1931 season. The Tigers outscored their opponents 110 to 52 for the season.

== Schedule ==
Date	Opponent	Site	Result	Source
September 25	at Modesto*	Modesto, CA	W 16–6	
October 3	Stockton American Legion*	Baxter Stadium; Stockton, CA	L 0–14	
October 10	Whitman*	Walla Walla, WA	W 7–0	
October 16	Nevada	Baxter Stadium; Stockton, CA	T 0–0	
October 23	Chico State^{†}	Baxter Stadium; Stockton, CA	W 27–6	
October 31	Cal Aggies	Baxter Stadium; Stockton, CA	T 20–20	
November 11	at Sacramento*	Sacramento, CA	W 13–0	
November 20	at San Jose State	Spartan Field; San Jose, CA (rivalry)	W 27–0	
November 26	at Fresno State	Fresno State College Stadium; Fresno, CA	L 0–6	
*Non-conference game; ^{†}Homecoming
