= 1931 Hawaii Rainbows football team =

American college football season

1931 Hawaii Rainbows football
- Conference: Independent
- Record: 3–2–1
- Head coach: Otto Klum (11th season)
- Home stadium: Honolulu Stadium

1931 Western college football independents records
| | Conf. | | | Overall |
| Team | W | L | T | W | | L | | T |
|---|---|---|---|---|---|---|---|---|
| Mount St. Charles | | – | | 6 | – | 0 | – | 0 |
| No. 5 Saint Mary's | | – | | 8 | – | 2 | – | 0 |
| Loyola (CA) | | – | | 7 | – | 2 | – | 1 |
| San Diego Marines | | – | | 6 | – | 4 | – | 0 |
| Hawaii | | – | | 3 | – | 2 | – | 1 |
| Santa Clara | | – | | 5 | – | 4 | – | 1 |
| San Francisco | | – | | 4 | – | 4 | – | 2 |
| San Francisco State | | – | | 2 | – | 3 | – | 3 |
| Gonzaga | | – | | 3 | – | 4 | – | 0 |
| Humboldt State | | – | | 1 | – | 2 | – | 1 |
| Columbia (OR) | | – | | 2 | – | 5 | – | 0 |
Rankings from Dickinson System

The 1931 Hawaii Rainbows football team represented the University of Hawaiʻi (now known as the University of Hawaiʻi at Mānoa) as an independent during the 1931 college football season. Led by 11th-year head coach Otto Klum, the Rainbows compiled an overall record of 3–2–1.

== Schedule ==
| Date | Opponent | Site | Result | Attendance | Source |
|---|---|---|---|---|---|
| October 24 | Saint Louis School alumni | Honolulu Stadium; Honolulu, Territory of Hawaii | L 13–20 | 6,000 | |
| November 4 | McKinley High School alumni | Honolulu Stadium; Honolulu, Territory of Hawaii | W 20–6 | 4,000 | |
| November 18 | Honolulu Town Team | Honolulu Stadium; Honolulu, Territory of Hawaii | T 6–6 | 7,000 | |
| December 9 | San Francisco | Honolulu Stadium; Honolulu, Territory of Hawaii | W 18–14 | 8,000 | |
| December 19 | Drake | Honolulu Stadium; Honolulu, Territory of Hawaii | W 19–13 | 7,000 | |
| January 1, 1932 | Oklahoma | Honolulu Stadium; Honolulu, Territory of Hawaii | L 0–7 | 10,000 | |
