= 1931 San Diego State Aztecs football team =

American college football season

1931 San Diego State Aztecs football
- Conference: Southern California Conference
- Record: 5–3–2 (2–2–1 SCC)
- Head coach: Walter Herreid (2nd season)
- Home stadium: Navy "Sports" Field

1931 Southern California Conference football standings
	Conf.					Overall
Team	W		L		T	W		L		T
Caltech $	5	–	1	–	0	6	–	2	–	1
Whittier	4	–	1	–	0	6	–	3	–	0
Occidental	3	–	2	–	0	3	–	4	–	1
Redlands	3	–	3	–	1	4	–	3	–	1
San Diego State	2	–	2	–	1	5	–	3	–	2
Pomona	2	–	3	–	0	2	–	6	–	0
La Verne	1	–	3	–	0	4	–	3	–	1
Santa Barbara State	0	–	5	–	0	1	–	5	–	1
$ – Conference champion

The 1931 San Diego State Aztecs football team represented San Diego State Teachers College (Note: San Diego State University was known as San Diego State Teachers College from 1924 to 1934.) during the 1931 college football season.

San Diego State competed in the Southern California Conference (SCC). The 1931 San Diego State team was led by head coach Walter Herreid in his second season with the Aztecs. They played home games at Navy "Sports" Field. (Note: Navy "Sports" Field was the original name of what became Lane Field in downtown San Diego. It was converted to a baseball-only configuration in 1936.) The Aztecs finished the season with five wins, three losses and two ties (5–3–2, 2–2–1 SCC). Overall, the team outscored its opponents 71–45 points for the season. This included shutting out their opponents six times and being shut out three times.

== Schedule ==
Date	Opponent	Site	Result	Attendance	Source
September 19	San Diego State alumni*	Navy "Sports" Field; San Diego, CA	T 0–0		
September 25	at Arizona*	Arizona Stadium; Tucson, AZ	W 8–0		
October 2	California Christian*	Navy "Sports" Field; San Diego, CA	W 27–0		
October 9	at Occidental	Rose Bowl; Pasadena, CA	L 2–13		
October 16	Redlands	Navy "Sports" Field; San Diego, CA	T 6–6		
October 23	at Whittier	Hadley Field; Whittier, CA	W 7–0		
October 31	Pomona	Navy "Sports" Field; San Diego, CA	W 6–0		
November 11	San Diego Marines (Note: The Marine Corps Recruit Depot (MCRD) in San Diego fielded a team that played against colleges and other military teams from 1922 to 1964.)*	Navy "Sports" Field; San Diego, CA	L 0–13		
November 26	Caltech	Navy "Sports" Field; San Diego, CA	L 0–13		
December 5	at Fresno State*	Fresno State College Stadium; Fresno, CA (rivalry)	W 15–0	2,000	
*Non-conference game
