= 1931 Santa Clara Broncos football team =

American college football season

1931 Santa Clara Broncos football
- Conference: Independent
- Record: 5–4–1
- Head coach: Clipper Smith (3rd season)
- Home stadium: Kezar Stadium

1931 Western college football independents records
	Conf.			Overall
Team	W	L	T	W		L		T
Mount St. Charles		–		6	–	0	–	0
No. 5 Saint Mary's		–		8	–	2	–	0
Loyola (CA)		–		7	–	2	–	1
San Diego Marines		–		6	–	4	–	0
Hawaii		–		3	–	2	–	1
Santa Clara		–		5	–	4	–	1
San Francisco		–		4	–	4	–	2
San Francisco State		–		2	–	3	–	3
Gonzaga		–		3	–	4	–	0
Humboldt State		–		1	–	2	–	1
Columbia (OR)		–		2	–	5	–	0
Rankings from Dickinson System

The 1931 Santa Clara Broncos football team was an American football team that represented Santa Clara University as an independent during the 1931 college football season. In their third season under head coach Clipper Smith, the Broncos compiled a 5–4–1 record and outscored opponents by a total of 94 to 53.

== Schedule ==
Date	Opponent	Site	Result	Attendance	Source
September 26	at California	California Memorial Stadium; Berkeley, CA	L 2–6		
October 3	at Stanford	Stanford Stadium; Stanford, CA	L 0–6	25,000	
October 11	at San Diego Marines	San Diego, CA	W 34–0		
October 17	at Olympic Club	Kezar Stadium; San Francisco, CA	W 19–6	4,000	
October 23	West Coast Army	Seals Stadium; San Francisco, CA	T 0–0	10,000	
November 1	at Saint Mary's	Kezar Stadium; San Francisco, CA	L 14–21	55,000	
November 6	at Loyola (CA)	Wrigley Field; Los Angeles, CA	W 6–0		
November 15	at San Francisco	Kezar Stadium; San Francisco, CA	L 0–7	12,000	
November 21	at Wyoming	Warren Bowl; Cheyenne, WY	W 6–0		
November 26	at Loyola (LA)	Loyola Stadium; New Orleans, LA	W 13–7	10,000	
