= 1931 Humboldt State Lumberjacks football team =

American college football season

1931 Humboldt State Lumberjacks football
- Conference: Independent
- Record: 1–2–1
- Head coach: Fred Telonicher (5th season)
- Home stadium: Albee Stadium

1931 Western college football independents records
	Conf.			Overall
Team	W	L	T	W		L		T
Mount St. Charles		–		6	–	0	–	0
No. 5 Saint Mary's		–		8	–	2	–	0
Loyola (CA)		–		7	–	2	–	1
San Diego Marines		–		6	–	4	–	0
Hawaii		–		3	–	2	–	1
Santa Clara		–		5	–	4	–	1
San Francisco		–		4	–	4	–	2
San Francisco State		–		2	–	3	–	3
Gonzaga		–		3	–	4	–	0
Humboldt State		–		1	–	2	–	1
Columbia (OR)		–		2	–	5	–	0
Rankings from Dickinson System

The 1931 Humboldt State Lumberjacks football team represented Humboldt State Normal College—now known as California State Polytechnic University, Humboldt—as an independent during the 1931 college football season. Led by fifth-year head coach Fred Telonicher, the Lumberjacks compiled a record of 1–2–1 and outscored their opponents 48 to 42 for the season. The team played home games at Albee Stadium in Eureka, California.

After the debacle of the previous season, in which Humboldt State failed to win a game and was outscored 268 to 7, the 1931 season was a step back for the team. They eliminated several colleges from their schedule and added back in a high school team.

== Schedule ==
Date	Opponent	Site	Result	Source
	Ferndale High School		W 20–0	
October 8	at Southern Oregon Normal	Walter E. Phillips Field?; Ashland, OR	L 7–9	
October 24	San Francisco State	Albee Stadium; Eureka, CA	T 7–7	
November 8	at Santa Rosa	Nevers Field; Santa Rosa, CA	L 14–26	
