= 1931 Utah Utes football team =

American college football season

1931 Utah Utes football

RMC champion
- Conference: Rocky Mountain Conference
- Record: 7–2 (6–0 RMC)
- Head coach: Ike Armstrong (7th season)
- Captain: Frank Christensen
- Home stadium: Ute Stadium

1931 Rocky Mountain Conference football standings
	Conf.					Overall
Team	W		L		T	W		L		T
Utah $	6	–	0	–	0	7	–	2	–	0
Utah State	5	–	2	–	0	6	–	2	–	0
Colorado Agricultural	5	–	2	–	0	5	–	4	–	0
Colorado	3	–	2	–	0	5	–	3	–	0
Wyoming	3	–	2	–	0	6	–	4	–	0
Colorado College	4	–	3	–	0	4	–	4	–	0
BYU	2	–	3	–	0	4	–	4	–	0
Denver	3	–	5	–	0	4	–	6	–	0
Colorado Teachers	2	–	4	–	1	2	–	4	–	1
Colorado Mines	0	–	4	–	1	1	–	5	–	1
Western State (CO)	1	–	5	–	0	1	–	6	–	0
Montana State	0	–	2	–	0	1	–	5	–	1
$ – Conference champion

The 1931 Utah Utes football team was an American football team that represented the University of Utah as a member of the Rocky Mountain Conference (RMC) during the 1931 college football season. Led by seventh-year head coach Ike Armstrong, the Utes compiled an overall record of 7–2 with a mark of 6–0 against conference opponents, winning the RMC title for fourth consecutive season and completing their third consecutive year of perfect conference play. Utah outscored all opponents by a total of 301 to 31.

== Schedule ==
Date	Opponent	Site	Result	Attendance	Source
September 26	at Washington*	Husky Stadium; Seattle, WA	L 6–7	24,000	
October 3	College of Idaho*	Ute Stadium; Salt Lake City, UT	W 52–0		
October 17	BYU	Ute Stadium; Salt Lake City, UT (rivalry)	W 43–0	15,000	
October 24	at Denver	DU Stadium; Denver, CO	W 46–0		
October 31	Colorado Agricultural^{†}	Ute Stadium; Salt Lake City, UT	W 60–6		
November 7	at Colorado College	Washburn Field; Colorado Springs, CO	W 28–6	5,000	
November 14	Colorado	Ute Stadium; Salt Lake City, UT (rivalry)	W 32–0		
November 26	Utah State	Ute Stadium; Salt Lake City, UT (rivalry)	W 34–0		
December 5	at Oregon State*	Multnomah Stadium; Portland, OR	L 0–12	15,000	
*Non-conference game; ^{†}Homecoming
