= 1931 Olympic Club Winged O football team =

American college football season

1931 Olympic Club Winged O football
- Conference: Independent
- Record: 6–3–2
- Head coach: Percy Locey (2nd season)
- Home stadium: Kezar Stadium

The 1931 Olympic Club Winged O football team represented the Olympic Club in the 1931 football season. The Olympic Club, originally the San Francisco Olympic Club, is the oldest athletic club in the United States. They compiled a 6–3–2 record, and outscored their opponents by a total of 90 to 59. The Club made front page news when they held the Stanford Indians to a scoreless tie and nearly defeated the Cal Golden Bears. After upsetting an undefeated Saint Mary's team, half of the Winged O's boarded the SS Matsonia on November 18 for the Hawaiian Islands, where they would play the winner of the Honolulu All-Star game, and the other half stayed behind to fill a prearranged game with Loyola.

== Schedule ==
Date	Time	Opponent	Site	Result	Attendance	Source
September 13	2:30 p.m.	West Coast Army	Kezar Stadium; San Francisco, CA	W 21–0	5,000	
September 20	2:30 p.m.	San Diego Marines	Kezar Stadium; San Francisco, CA	W 19–2		
September 26		at Stanford	Stanford Stadium; Stanford, CA	T 0–0		
October 4		at Los Angeles Fire Department	Olympic Stadium; Los Angeles, CA	W 7–6	8,000	
October 10		at California	California Memorial Stadium; Berkekely, CA	L 0–6		
October 17		Santa Clara	Kezar Stadium; San Francisco, CA	L 6–19	12,000	
October 24	5:00 p.m.	at West Coast Navy	Los Angeles, CA	W 7–6		
October 31		San Francisco	Kezar Stadium; San Francisco, CA	T 7–7	1,000	
November 8		Saint Mary's	Kezar Stadium; San Francisco, CA	W 10–0	25,000	
November 21		at Loyola (CA)	Los Angeles, CA	L 0–13		
November 28		Honolulu Town team	Honolulu, HI	W 13–0		
