= 1931 Oregon State Beavers football team =

American college football season

1931 Oregon State Beavers football
- Conference: Pacific Coast Conference
- Record: 6–3–1 (1–3–1 PCC)
- Head coach: Paul J. Schissler (8th season)
- Captain: None
- Home stadium: Bell Field

1931 Pacific Coast Conference football standings
| | Conf. | | | | | Overall |
| Team | W | | L | | T | W | | L | | T |
|---|---|---|---|---|---|---|---|---|---|---|
| No. 1 USC $ | 7 | – | 0 | – | 0 | 10 | – | 1 | – | 0 |
| California | 4 | – | 1 | – | 0 | 8 | – | 2 | – | 0 |
| Oregon | 3 | – | 1 | – | 1 | 6 | – | 2 | – | 2 |
| Washington State | 4 | – | 3 | – | 0 | 6 | – | 4 | – | 0 |
| Washington | 3 | – | 3 | – | 1 | 5 | – | 3 | – | 1 |
| Stanford | 2 | – | 2 | – | 1 | 7 | – | 2 | – | 2 |
| Oregon State | 1 | – | 3 | – | 1 | 6 | – | 3 | – | 1 |
| Idaho | 1 | – | 4 | – | 0 | 3 | – | 4 | – | 0 |
| UCLA | 0 | – | 3 | – | 0 | 3 | – | 4 | – | 1 |
| Montana | 0 | – | 5 | – | 0 | 1 | – | 6 | – | 0 |
$ – Conference champion; Rankings from Dickinson System

The 1931 Oregon State Beavers football team represented Oregon State College in the Pacific Coast Conference (PCC) during the 1931 college football season. In their eighth season under head coach Paul J. Schissler, the Beavers compiled a 6–3–1 record (1–3–1 against PCC opponents), finished in seventh place in the PCC, and outscored their opponents, 198 to 62.

Under Coach Schissler, from 1925 to 1932, no team captains were elected. The team played its home games at Bell Field in Corvallis, Oregon and at Multnomah Stadium in Portland.

The OSC squad finished the season ranked #42 nationally.

== Schedule ==
| Date | Opponent | Site | Result | Attendance | Source |
|---|---|---|---|---|---|
| September 19 | Willamette* | Bell Field; Corvallis, OR | W 76–0 | | |
| September 26 | Colorado* | Multnomah Stadium; Portland, OR | W 16–0 | 23,000 | |
| October 3 | at USC | Los Angeles Memorial Coliseum; Los Angeles, CA | L 0–30 | 50,000 | |
| October 9 | Linfield* | Bell Field; Corvallis, OR | W 25–0 | | |
| October 17 | at Stanford | Stanford Stadium; Stanford, CA | L 7–25 | 18,000 | |
| October 24 | Oregon Normal* | Bell Field; Corvallis, OR | W 37–0 | | |
| October 31 | Washington State | Multnomah Stadium; Portland, OR | L 6–7 | | |
| November 7 | Montana | Bell Field; Corvallis, OR | W 19–0 | | |
| November 14 | at Oregon | Hayward Field; Eugene, OR (rivalry) | T 0–0 | 20,000 | |
| December 5 | Utah* | Multnomah Stadium; Portland, OR | W 12–0 | 15,000 | |
*Non-conference game
