= Telfer L. Mead =

American sports coach and administrator (1888–1983)

Biographical details
- Born: March 3, 1888; Kendall County, Illinois, U.S.
- Died: June 3, 1983 (aged 95); Denver, Colorado, U.S.

Playing career

Football
- 1912: Indiana

Coaching career (HC unless noted)

Football
- 1916: East Aurora HS (IL)
- 1919–1921: Lincoln HS (NE)
- 1922–1925: Colorado College
- 1927–1928: Northern Normal
- 1930–1934: Western State (CO)

Basketball
- 1922–1926: Colorado College
- 1927–1929: Northern Normal
- 1930–1934: Western State (CO)

Administrative career (AD unless noted)
- 1922–1925: Colorado College

Head coaching record
- Overall: 25–47–6 (college football); 93–59 (college basketball)

Telfer Lamar Mead (March 3, 1888 – June 3, 1983) was an American football and basketball coach and college athletics administrator. He served as the head football coach at Colorado College from 1922 to 1925, Northern Normal and Industrial School—now known as Northern State University—in Aberdeen, South Dakota from 1927 to 1928, and Western State College of Colorado—now known as Western Colorado University—in Gunnison, Colorado from 1930 to 1934, compiling a career college football coaching record of 25–47–6. He was also the head basketball coach at Colorado College from 1922 to 1926, Northern Normal and Industrial from 1927 to 1929, and Western State from 1930 to 1934, tallying a career college basketball coaching mark of 93–59.

== Head coaching record ==
=== College football ===
Year	Team	Overall	Conference	Standing	Bowl/playoffs
Colorado College Tigers (Rocky Mountain Conference) (1922–1925)
1922	Colorado College	3–3–1	2–3–1	5th	
1923	Colorado College	6–1–1	5–1–1	T–2nd	
1924	Colorado College	5–3	4–3	5th	
1925	Colorado College	5–4–1	4–4	T–6th	
Colorado College:		19–11–3	15–11–2		
Northern Normal Wolves (South Dakota Intercollegiate Conference) (1927–1928)
1927	Northern Normal	0–7–2	0–4–2	10th	
1928	Northern Normal	2–2–1	2–2–1	T–7th	
Northern Normal:		2–9–3	2–6–3		
Western State Mountaineers (Rocky Mountain Conference) (1930–1934)
1930	Western State	0–6	0–5	12th	
1931	Western State	1–6	1–5	10th	
1932	Western State	1–5	0–5	12th	
1933	Western State	0–5	0–5	12th	
1934	Western State	2–5	0–3	11th	
Western State:		4–27	1–23		
Total:		25–47–6			
