= 1931 Colorado Teachers Bears football team =

American college football season

1931 Colorado Teachers Bears football
- Conference: Rocky Mountain Conference
- Record: 2–4–1 (2–4–1 RMC)
- Head coach: Bill Saunders (4th season)
- Home stadium: Jackson Field

1931 Rocky Mountain Conference football standings
| | Conf. | | | | | Overall |
| Team | W | | L | | T | W | | L | | T |
|---|---|---|---|---|---|---|---|---|---|---|
| Utah $ | 6 | – | 0 | – | 0 | 7 | – | 2 | – | 0 |
| Utah State | 5 | – | 2 | – | 0 | 6 | – | 2 | – | 0 |
| Colorado Agricultural | 5 | – | 2 | – | 0 | 5 | – | 4 | – | 0 |
| Colorado | 3 | – | 2 | – | 0 | 5 | – | 3 | – | 0 |
| Wyoming | 3 | – | 2 | – | 0 | 6 | – | 4 | – | 0 |
| Colorado College | 4 | – | 3 | – | 0 | 4 | – | 4 | – | 0 |
| BYU | 2 | – | 3 | – | 0 | 4 | – | 4 | – | 0 |
| Denver | 3 | – | 5 | – | 0 | 4 | – | 6 | – | 0 |
| Colorado Teachers | 2 | – | 4 | – | 1 | 2 | – | 4 | – | 1 |
| Colorado Mines | 0 | – | 4 | – | 1 | 1 | – | 5 | – | 1 |
| Western State (CO) | 1 | – | 5 | – | 0 | 1 | – | 6 | – | 0 |
| Montana State | 0 | – | 2 | – | 0 | 1 | – | 5 | – | 1 |
$ – Conference champion

The 1931 Colorado Teachers Bears football team was an American football team that represented the Colorado State Teachers College (later renamed University of Northern Colorado) in the Rocky Mountain Conference during the 1931 college football season. The team was led by fourth year head coach Bill Saunders and the Bears finished with an overall and conference record of 2–4–1.

== Schedule ==
| Date | Opponent | Site | Result | Attendance | Source |
|---|---|---|---|---|---|
| October 3 | at Denver | DU Stadium; Denver, CO | L 0–14 | 12,000 | |
| October 10 | Wyoming | Jackson Field; Greeley, CO | L 6–13 | | |
| October 17 | at Colorado College | Washburn Field; Colorado Springs, CO | L 7–9 | 1,000 | |
| October 31 | BYU | Jackson Field; Greeley, CO | W 6–0 | | |
| November 11 | Colorado Mines | Jackson Field; Greeley, CO | T 12–12 | | |
| November 26 | at Western State (CO) | Gunnison, CO | W 13–2 | | |
| December 1 | at Colorado Agricultural | Colorado Field; Fort Collins, CO | L 7–21 | | |
