= 1931 Arizona State–Flagstaff Lumberjacks football team =

American college football season

1931 Arizona State–Flagstaff Lumberjacks football
- Conference: Border Conference
- Record: 3–5 (1–3 Border)
- Head coach: Rudy Lavik (5th season)
- Home stadium: Skidmore Field

1931 Border Conference football standings
	Conf.					Overall
Team	W		L		T	W		L		T
Arizona State $	3	–	0	–	0	6	–	2	–	0
New Mexico	1	–	1	–	1	3	–	3	–	1
Arizona	1	–	1	–	1	3	–	5	–	1
New Mexico A&M	1	–	2	–	0	6	–	4	–	0
Arizona State–Flagstaff	1	–	3	–	0	3	–	5	–	0
$ – Conference champion; Arizona State and Arizona State–Flagstaff played twice, but only the first meeting counted in the conference standings.

The 1931 Arizona State–Flagstaff Lumberjacks football team was an American football team that represented Arizona State Teachers College at Flagstaff (now known as Northern Arizona University) in the Border Conference during the 1931 college football season. In their fifth year under head coach Rudy Lavik, the Lumberjacks compiled an overall record of 3–5 with a mark of 1–3 in conference play, placing last out of five team in the Border Conference.

== Schedule ==
Date	Opponent	Site	Result	Source
September 26	at Fresno State*	Fresno State College Stadium; Fresno, CA	W 26–2	
October 3	Caltech*	Skidmore Field; Flagstaff, AZ	L 0–13	
October 10	New Mexico A&M	Skidmore Field; Flagstaff, AZ	W 13–6	
October 24	Arizona State^{†}	Skidmore Field; Flagstaff, AZ	L 6–20	
October 31	at New Mexico	University Field; Albuquerque, NM	L 6–20	
November 7	at Arizona	Arizona Stadium; Tucson, AZ	L 12–19	
November 21	at Arizona State (Note: The second game between Arizona State–Flagstaff and Arizona State did not count in the Border Conference standings.)*	Irish Field; Tempe, AZ	W 13–6	
November 28	at Whittier*	Hadley Field; Whittier, CA	L 7–39	
*Non-conference game; ^{†}Homecoming
