= 1931 San Diego Marines Devil Dogs football team =

American college football season

1931 San Diego Marines Devil Dogs football

West Coast Service team champion?
- Conference: Independent
- Record: 6–4
- Head coach: John Beckett (1st season)
- Captain: Harry Liversedge

1931 Western college football independents records
	Conf.			Overall
Team	W	L	T	W		L		T
Mount St. Charles		–		6	–	0	–	0
No. 5 Saint Mary's		–		8	–	2	–	0
Loyola (CA)		–		7	–	2	–	1
San Diego Marines		–		6	–	4	–	0
Hawaii		–		3	–	2	–	1
Santa Clara		–		5	–	4	–	1
San Francisco		–		4	–	4	–	2
San Francisco State		–		2	–	3	–	3
Gonzaga		–		3	–	4	–	0
Humboldt State		–		1	–	2	–	1
Columbia (OR)		–		2	–	5	–	0
Rankings from Dickinson System

The 1931 San Diego Marine Devil Dogs football team represented Marine Corps Recruit Depot San Diego during the 1931 football season. The Devil Dogs compiled a 6–4 record against a schedule of local and collegiate teams, and outscored their opponents by a total of 120 to 110 or 111.

== Schedule ==
Date	Time	Opponent	Site	Result	Attendance	Source
September 11	8:00 p.m.	at Santa Barbara Athletic Club	Pershing field; Santa Barbara, CA	W 25–0		
September 20		Los Angeles Fire Department	San Diego, CA	Cancelled?		
September 20	2:30 p.m.	at Olympic Club	Kezar Stadium; San Francisco, CA	L 2–19		
September 26		vs. Cal Aggies	Vallejo, CA	L 6–20	2,000	
October 3		at San Jose State	Spartan Field?; San Jose, CA	W 8–0		
October 11		Santa Clara	San Diego, CA	L 0–34 or 0–33		
October 18		West Coast Navy	San Diego, CA (First West Coast service championship)	L 10–24	5,000	
November 1		West Coast Army	San Diego, CA (Second West Coast service championship)	W 15–7		
November 11		San Diego State	Navy Field; San Diego, CA	W 13–0		
November 21	2:00 p.m.	San Pedro Longshoremen	Navy Field; San Diego, CA	W 34–7		
November 29		Loyola (CA)	San Diego, CA	W 7–0		
