= 1931 Mount St. Charles Fighting Saints football team =

American college football season

1931 Mount St. Charles Fighting Saints football
- Conference: Independent
- Record: 6–0
- Head coach: Bill Jones (1st season)

1931 Western college football independents records
	Conf.			Overall
Team	W	L	T	W		L		T
Mount St. Charles		–		6	–	0	–	0
No. 5 Saint Mary's		–		8	–	2	–	0
Loyola (CA)		–		7	–	2	–	1
San Diego Marines		–		6	–	4	–	0
Hawaii		–		3	–	2	–	1
Santa Clara		–		5	–	4	–	1
San Francisco		–		4	–	4	–	2
San Francisco State		–		2	–	3	–	3
Gonzaga		–		3	–	4	–	0
Humboldt State		–		1	–	2	–	1
Columbia (OR)		–		2	–	5	–	0
Rankings from Dickinson System

The 1931 Mount St. Charles Fighting Saints football team represented Mount St. Charles College (later renamed Carroll College) as an independent during the 1931 college football season. In their first year under head coach Bill Jones, the Fighting Saints compiled a perfect 6–0 record and outscored opponents by a total of 192 to 0.

The 1931 season was the first perfect season in Carroll College football history, a feat later accomplished by the 1973, 2003, 2005, 2007, and 2010 teams.

== Schedule ==
Date	Opponent	Site	Result	Attendance	Source
September 20	Centerville Independents	Helena, MT	W 20–0		
September 26	at Montana	Dornblaser Field; Missoula, MT	W 2–0		
October 17	Montana Normal	Dillon, MT	W 83–0		
October 24	at Montana Mines	Butte, MT	W 19–0		
October 31	Intermountain Union	Helena, MT	W 62–0		
November 11	Montana State	Helena, MT	W 6–0	2,500	
