= 1931 New Mexico Lobos football team =

American college football season

1931 New Mexico Lobos football
- Conference: Border Conference
- Record: 3–3–1 (1–1–1 Border)
- Head coach: Chuck Riley (1st season)
- Home stadium: University Field

1931 Border Conference football standings
	Conf.					Overall
Team	W		L		T	W		L		T
Arizona State $	3	–	0	–	0	6	–	2	–	0
New Mexico	1	–	1	–	1	3	–	3	–	1
Arizona	1	–	1	–	1	3	–	5	–	1
New Mexico A&M	1	–	2	–	0	6	–	4	–	0
Arizona State–Flagstaff	1	–	3	–	0	3	–	5	–	0
$ – Conference champion; Arizona State and Arizona State–Flagstaff played twice, but only the first meeting counted in the conference standings.

The 1931 New Mexico Lobos football team represented the University of New Mexico as a member of the Border Conference during the 1931 college football season. In their first season under head coach Chuck Riley, the Lobos compiled an overall record of 3–3–1 record with a mark of 1–1–1 against conference opponents, finished second in the Border Conference, and outscored opponents by a total of 80 to 70.

Coach Riley arrived in Albuquerque in August 1931. Riley had played football at Notre Dame and served as an assistant coach on the 1930 Loyola Lions football team. Riley brought with him former Notre Dame center Joe Nash as an assistant coach.

== Schedule ==
Date	Opponent	Site	Result	Attendance	Source
October 17	at New Mexico Military*	Institute Field; Roswell, NM	W 25–0		
October 24	Occidental*	University Field; Albuquerque, NM	W 14–0		
October 31	Arizona State–Flagstaff	University Field; Albuquerque, NM	W 20–6		
November 7	at New Mexico A&M	Miller Field; Las Cruces, NM (rivalry)	L 6–13		
November 14	Arizona^{†}	University Field; Albuquerque, NM (rivalry)	T 7–7		
November 20	at Texas Tech*	Tech Field; Lubbock, TX	L 6–32	2,500	
November 26	Wyoming*	University Field; Albuquerque, NM	L 2–12		
*Non-conference game; ^{†}Homecoming
