= 1931 BYU Cougars football team =

American college football season

1931 BYU Cougars football
- Conference: Rocky Mountain Conference
- Record: 4–4 (2–3 RMC)
- Head coach: G. Ott Romney (4th season)
- Home stadium: BYU Stadium

1931 Rocky Mountain Conference football standings
	Conf.					Overall
Team	W		L		T	W		L		T
Utah $	6	–	0	–	0	7	–	2	–	0
Utah State	5	–	2	–	0	6	–	2	–	0
Colorado Agricultural	5	–	2	–	0	5	–	4	–	0
Colorado	3	–	2	–	0	5	–	3	–	0
Wyoming	3	–	2	–	0	6	–	4	–	0
Colorado College	4	–	3	–	0	4	–	4	–	0
BYU	2	–	3	–	0	4	–	4	–	0
Denver	3	–	5	–	0	4	–	6	–	0
Colorado Teachers	2	–	4	–	1	2	–	4	–	1
Colorado Mines	0	–	4	–	1	1	–	5	–	1
Western State (CO)	1	–	5	–	0	1	–	6	–	0
Montana State	0	–	2	–	0	1	–	5	–	1
$ – Conference champion

The 1931 BYU Cougars football team was an American football team that represented Brigham Young University (BYU) as a member of the Rocky Mountain Conference (RMC) during the 1931 college football season. In their fourth season under head coach G. Ott Romney, the Cougars compiled an overall record of 4–4 with a mark of 2–3 against conference opponents, finished seventh in the RMC, and were outscored by a total of 104 to 69.

== Schedule ==
Date	Opponent	Site	Result	Attendance	Source
September 18	vs. UAY All-Stars*	Ogden Stadium; Ogden, UT	W 7–3	2,500	
September 25	at San Francisco*	Seals Stadium; San Francisco, CA	L 0–25	20,000	
October 3	at Nevada*	Mackay Field; Reno, NV	W 18–14		
October 17	at Utah	Ute Stadium; Salt Lake City, UT (rivalry)	L 0–43	15,000	
October 24	Western State (CO)	BYU Stadium; Provo, UT	W 31–0		
October 31	at Colorado Teachers	Jackson Field; Greeley, CO	L 0–6		
November 7	vs. Utah State	Ogden Stadium; Ogden, UT (rivalry)	W 6–0	5,000	
November 13	Wyoming^{†}	BYU Stadium; Provo, UT	L 7–13	3,000	
*Non-conference game; ^{†}Homecoming
