= 1931 Saint Mary's Gaels football team =

American college football season

1931 Saint Mary's Gaels football
- Conference: Independent
- Record: 8–2
- Head coach: Slip Madigan (11th season)
- Home stadium: Kezar Stadium

1931 Western college football independents records
	Conf.			Overall
Team	W	L	T	W		L		T
Mount St. Charles		–		6	–	0	–	0
No. 5 Saint Mary's		–		8	–	2	–	0
Loyola (CA)		–		7	–	2	–	1
San Diego Marines		–		6	–	4	–	0
Hawaii		–		3	–	2	–	1
Santa Clara		–		5	–	4	–	1
San Francisco		–		4	–	4	–	2
San Francisco State		–		2	–	3	–	3
Gonzaga		–		3	–	4	–	0
Humboldt State		–		1	–	2	–	1
Columbia (OR)		–		2	–	5	–	0
Rankings from Dickinson System

The 1931 Saint Mary's Gaels football team was an American football team that represented Saint Mary's College of California during the 1931 college football season. In their 11th season under head coach Slip Madigan, the Gaels compiled an 8–2 record and outscored all opponents by a combined total of 119 to 65. The Gaels' victories included a 13–7 besting of USC, a 14–0 besting of California, a 16–0 victory over Oregon, and a 7–2 victory over Southwest Conference champion SMU. The lone setbacks were losses to the Olympic Club (0–10) and UCLA (0–12).

Halfback Bud Toscani and guard Bill Fisher were selected by both the Associated Press and the United Press as first-team players on the 1931 All-Pacific Coast football team.

== Schedule ==
Date	Opponent	Site	Result	Attendance	Source
September 26	at USC	Los Angeles Memorial Coliseum; Los Angeles, CA	W 13–7	70,000	
October 3	at California	California Memorial Stadium; Berkeley, CA	W 14–0	70,000	
October 11	West Coast Army	Kezar Stadium; San Francisco, CA	W 21–7	30,000	
October 17	San Francisco	Kezar Stadium; San Francisco, CA	W 14–6	50,000	
October 25	Gonzaga	Kezar Stadium; San Francisco, CA	W 13–7	7,000	
November 1	Santa Clara	Kezar Stadium; San Francisco, CA	W 21–14	55,000	
November 8	Olympic Club	Kezar Stadium; San Francisco, CA	L 0–10	25,000	
November 11	at UCLA	Los Angeles Memorial Coliseum; Los Angeles, CA	L 0–12	50,000	
November 26	Oregon	Kezar Stadium; San Francisco, CA (rivalry)	W 16–0	20,000	
December 5	SMU	Kezar Stadium; San Francisco, CA	W 7–2	50,000	
