= 1931 Cal Aggies football team =

American college football season

1931 Cal Aggies football
- Conference: Far Western Conference
- Record: 4–2–2 (2–1–2 FWC)
- Head coach: Crip Toomey (4th season)
- Captains: Dudley Stephens; Joe Fiack
- Home stadium: Sacramento Stadium

1931 Far Western Conference football standings
	Conf.					Overall
Team	W		L		T	W		L		T
Pacific (CA)	2	–	1	–	2	5	–	2	–	2
Cal Aggies	2	–	1	–	2	4	–	2	–	2
Chico State	2	–	1	–	1	3	–	4	–	1
Nevada	2	–	1	–	1	2	–	5	–	2
Fresno State	3	–	2	–	0	4	–	6	–	0
San Jose State	0	–	5	–	0	1	–	8	–	0
No champion was named for the 1931 season.

The 1931 Cal Aggies football team represented the Northern Branch of the College of Agriculture—now known as the University of California, Davis—as a member of the Far Western Conference (FWC) during the 1931 college football season. Led by fourth-year head coach Crip Toomey, the Aggies compiled an overall record of 4–2–2 with a mark of 2–1–2 in conference play, placing in a four-way tie for first in the FWC. No champion was named for the 1931 season. The team outscored its opponents 92 to 75 for the season. The Cal Aggies played home games at Sacramento Stadium in Sacramento, California.

== Schedule ==
Date	Time	Opponent	Site	Result	Attendance	Source
September 26		vs. San Diego Marines (Note: The Marine Corps Recruit Depot (MCRD) in San Diego fielded a team that played against colleges and other military teams from 1922 to 1964.)*	Vallejo, CA	W 20–6	2,000	
October 3		vs. Sacramento*	Sacramento Stadium; Sacramento, CA	W 14–2		
October 9	8:00 p.m.	Nevada	Sacramento Stadium; Sacramento, CA	W 12–0		
October 16	8:00 p.m.	West Coast Army*	Sacramento Stadium; Sacramento, CA	L 6–25		
October 31		at Pacific (CA)	Pacific Stadium; Stockton, CA	T 20–20		
November 7	2:30 p.m.	Fresno State	Sacramento Stadium; Sacramento, CA	L 7–20		
November 14		at San Jose State	Spartan Field; San Jose, CA	W 13–0		
November 26		Chico State	Sacramento Stadium; Sacramento, CA	T 0–0		
*Non-conference game; All times are in Pacific time
