= 1931 Oregon Webfoots football team =

American college football season

1931 Oregon Webfoots football
- Conference: Pacific Coast Conference
- Record: 6–2–2 (3–1–1 PCC)
- Head coach: Clarence Spears (2nd season)
- Captain: Irv Schultz
- Home stadium: Hayward Field

1931 Pacific Coast Conference football standings
| | Conf. | | | | | Overall |
| Team | W | | L | | T | W | | L | | T |
|---|---|---|---|---|---|---|---|---|---|---|
| No. 1 USC $ | 7 | – | 0 | – | 0 | 10 | – | 1 | – | 0 |
| California | 4 | – | 1 | – | 0 | 8 | – | 2 | – | 0 |
| Oregon | 3 | – | 1 | – | 1 | 6 | – | 2 | – | 2 |
| Washington State | 4 | – | 3 | – | 0 | 6 | – | 4 | – | 0 |
| Washington | 3 | – | 3 | – | 1 | 5 | – | 3 | – | 1 |
| Stanford | 2 | – | 2 | – | 1 | 7 | – | 2 | – | 2 |
| Oregon State | 1 | – | 3 | – | 1 | 6 | – | 3 | – | 1 |
| Idaho | 1 | – | 4 | – | 0 | 3 | – | 4 | – | 0 |
| UCLA | 0 | – | 3 | – | 0 | 3 | – | 4 | – | 1 |
| Montana | 0 | – | 5 | – | 0 | 1 | – | 6 | – | 0 |
$ – Conference champion; Rankings from Dickinson System

The 1931 Oregon Webfoots football team represented the University of Oregon in the Pacific Coast Conference (PCC) during the 1931 college football season. In their second and final season under head coach Clarence Spears, the Webfoots compiled a 6–2–2 record (3–1–1 against PCC opponents), finished in third place in the PCC, and outscored their opponents, 90 to 87. The team played its home games at Hayward Field in Eugene, Oregon.

== Schedule ==
| Date | Opponent | Site | Result | Attendance | Source |
|---|---|---|---|---|---|
| September 25 | Oregon Normal* | Hayward Field; Eugene, OR | W 21–6 | | |
| September 26 | Willamette* | Hayward Field; Eugene, OR | W 20–0 | | |
| October 3 | Idaho | Multnomah Stadium; Portland, OR | W 9–0 | 10,000 | |
| October 10 | at Washington | Husky Stadium; Seattle, WA (rivalry) | W 13–0 | 35,000 | |
| October 17 | at USC | Los Angeles Memorial Coliseum; Los Angeles, CA | L 0–53 | 50,000 | |
| October 24 | at North Dakota* | Memorial Stadium; Grand Forks, ND | T 0–0 | 10,000 | |
| October 31 | at NYU* | Yankee Stadium; Bronx, NY | W 14–6 | 20,000 | |
| November 14 | Oregon State | Hayward Field; Eugene, OR (rivalry) | T 0–0 | 20,000 | |
| November 21 | at UCLA | Los Angeles Memorial Coliseum; Los Angeles, CA | W 13–6 | 15,000 | |
| November 26 | at Saint Mary's* | Kezar Stadium; San Francisco, CA (rivalry) | L 0–16 | 20,000 | |
*Non-conference game; Source:
