= 1931 Fresno State Bulldogs football team =

American college football season

1931 Fresno State Bulldogs football
- Conference: Far Western Conference
- Record: 4–6 (3–2 FWC)
- Head coach: Stanley Borleske (3rd season)
- Home stadium: Fresno State College Stadium

1931 Far Western Conference football standings
	Conf.					Overall
Team	W		L		T	W		L		T
Pacific (CA)	2	–	1	–	2	5	–	2	–	2
Cal Aggies	2	–	1	–	2	4	–	2	–	2
Chico State	2	–	1	–	1	3	–	4	–	1
Nevada	2	–	1	–	1	2	–	5	–	2
Fresno State	3	–	2	–	0	4	–	6	–	0
San Jose State	0	–	5	–	0	1	–	8	–	0
No champion was named for the 1931 season.

The 1931 Fresno State Bulldogs football team represented Fresno State Normal School—now known as California State University, Fresno—during the 1931 college football season.

Fresno State competed in the Far Western Conference (FWC). (Note: The Northern California Athletic Conference (NCAC) was known as the Far Western Conference (FWC) from its founding in 1925 to 1982.) The 1931 team was led by third-year head coach Stanley Borleske and played home games at Fresno State College Stadium (Note: Ratcliffe Stadium was known as Fresno State College Stadium from 1926 to 1940.) on the campus of Fresno City College in Fresno, California. They finished the season with a record of four wins and six losses (4–6, 3–2 FWC). The Bulldogs were outscored by their opponents 98–123 for the season.

== Schedule ==
Date	Opponent	Site	Result	Attendance	Source
September 26	at Arizona State–Flagstaff*	Skidmore Field; Flagstaff, AZ	L 2–26		
October 3	Whittier*	Fresno State College Stadium; Fresno, CA	W 13–12	3,000	
October 10	La Verne*	Fresno State College Stadium; Fresno, CA	L 6–7		
October 17	at San Jose State	Spartan Field; San Jose, CA (rivalry)	W 32–0		
October 24	at Nevada	Mackay Stadium (Note: This stadium is the predecessor to the current Mackay Stadium, which was opened for the 1966 season.); Reno, NV	L 13–31	5,000	
November 7	at Cal Aggies	Sacramento Stadium; Sacramento, CA	W 20–7		
November 11	Arizona State*	Fresno State College Stadium; Fresno, CA	L 0–7	6,000	
November 21	at Chico State	College Field; Chico, CA	L 6–18		
November 26	Pacific (CA)	Fresno State College Stadium; Fresno, CA	W 6–0		
December 5	San Diego State*	Fresno State College Stadium; Fresno, CA (rivalry)	L 0–15	2,000	
*Non-conference game
