= 1931 San Jose State Spartans football team =

American college football season

1931 San Jose State Spartans football
- Conference: Far Western Conference
- Record: 1–8 (0–5 FWC)
- Head coach: Mush Crawford (3rd season)
- Home stadium: Spartan Field

1931 Far Western Conference football standings
	Conf.					Overall
Team	W		L		T	W		L		T
Pacific (CA)	2	–	1	–	2	5	–	2	–	2
Cal Aggies	2	–	1	–	2	4	–	2	–	2
Chico State	2	–	1	–	1	3	–	4	–	1
Nevada	2	–	1	–	1	2	–	5	–	2
Fresno State	3	–	2	–	0	4	–	6	–	0
San Jose State	0	–	5	–	0	1	–	8	–	0
No champion was named for the 1931 season.

The 1931 San Jose State Spartans football team represented State Teachers College at San Jose (Note: San Jose State University was known as State Teachers College at San Jose from 1921 to 1934.) during the 1931 college football season.

San Jose State competed in the Far Western Conference (FWC). (Note: The Northern California Athletic Conference (NCAC) was known as the Far Western Conference (FWC) from its founding in 1925 to 1982.) The team was led by third-year head coach Mush Crawford, and they played home games at Spartan Field in San Jose, California. The team finished the season with a record of one win and eight losses (1–8, 0–5 FWC). The Spartans were outscored by their opponents 20–126 for the season, and were shut out in eight of the nine games.

== Schedule ==
Date	Opponent	Site	Result	Source
October 3	San Diego Marines (Note: The Marine Corps Recruit Depot (MCRD) in San Diego fielded a team that played against colleges and other military teams from 1922 to 1964.)*	Spartan Field; San Jose, CA	L 0–8	
October 10	at San Mateo*	San Mateo, CA	W 20–0	
October 17	Fresno State	Spartan Field; San Jose, CA (rivalry)	L 0–32	
October 24	at Sacramento*	Sacramento, CA	L 0–12	
October 31	at Chico State	College Field; Chico, CA	L 0–7	
November 7	Nevada	Spartan Field; San Jose, CA	L 0–18	
November 14	Cal Aggies	Spartan Field; San Jose, CA	L 0–13	
November 20	Pacific (CA)	Spartan Field; San Jose, CA (rivalry)	L 0–27	
November 26	at Modesto*	Modesto, CA	L 0–9	
*Non-conference game
