= 1931 Santa Barbara State Roadrunners football team =

American college football season

1931 Santa Barbara State Roadrunners football
- Conference: Southern California Conference
- Record: 1–5–1 (0–5 SCC)
- Head coach: Harold Davis (4th season)
- Home stadium: Peabody Stadium

1931 Southern California Conference football standings
	Conf.					Overall
Team	W		L		T	W		L		T
Caltech $	5	–	1	–	0	6	–	2	–	1
Whittier	4	–	1	–	0	6	–	3	–	0
Occidental	3	–	2	–	0	3	–	4	–	1
Redlands	3	–	3	–	1	4	–	3	–	1
San Diego State	2	–	2	–	1	5	–	3	–	2
Pomona	2	–	3	–	0	2	–	6	–	0
La Verne	1	–	3	–	0	4	–	3	–	1
Santa Barbara State	0	–	5	–	0	1	–	5	–	1
$ – Conference champion

The 1931 Santa Barbara State Roadrunners football team represented Santa Barbara State (Note: University of California, Santa Barbara was known as Santa Barbara State College from 1921 to 1943.) during the 1931 college football season.

Santa Barbara State competed in the Southern California Conference (SCC). The Roadrunners were led by fourth-year head coach Harold Davis and played home games at Peabody Stadium in Santa Barbara, California. They finished the season with a record of one win, five losses and one tie (1–5–1, 0–5 SCC). (Note: cfbwarehouse.com lists an additional 1931 game against the San Diego Marines with no date. However, the Santa Barbara State yearbook only lists the games shown above. In addition, the yearbook has a different score (used here) for the game against Redlands.) Overall, the team was outscored by its opponents 46–115 for the season.

== Schedule ==
Date	Opponent	Site	Result	Source
September 25	Caltech	Peabody Stadium; Santa Barbara, CA	L 0–31	
October 9	Cal Poly*	Peabody Stadium; Santa Barbara, CA	W 13–0	
October 17	at Pomona	Claremont Alumni Field; Claremont, CA	L 7–14	
October 23	La Verne	Peabody Stadium; Santa Barbara, CA	L 13–18	
October 30	Whittier	Peabody Stadium; Santa Barbara, CA	L 7–32	
November 6	California Christian*	Peabody Stadium; Santa Barbara, CA	T 6–6	
November 13	Redlands	Peabody Stadium; Santa Barbara, CA	L 0–14	
*Non-conference game
