= 1931 Wyoming Cowboys football team =

American college football season

1931 Wyoming Cowboys football
- Conference: Rocky Mountain Conference
- Record: 6–4 (3–2 RMC)
- Head coach: John Rhodes (2nd season)
- Captain: None
- Home stadium: Corbett Field

1931 Rocky Mountain Conference football standings
	Conf.					Overall
Team	W		L		T	W		L		T
Utah $	6	–	0	–	0	7	–	2	–	0
Utah State	5	–	2	–	0	6	–	2	–	0
Colorado Agricultural	5	–	2	–	0	5	–	4	–	0
Colorado	3	–	2	–	0	5	–	3	–	0
Wyoming	3	–	2	–	0	6	–	4	–	0
Colorado College	4	–	3	–	0	4	–	4	–	0
BYU	2	–	3	–	0	4	–	4	–	0
Denver	3	–	5	–	0	4	–	6	–	0
Colorado Teachers	2	–	4	–	1	2	–	4	–	1
Western State (CO)	1	–	5	–	0	1	–	6	–	0
Montana State	0	–	2	–	0	1	–	5	–	1
Colorado Mines	0	–	4	–	1	1	–	5	–	1
$ – Conference champion

The 1931 Wyoming Cowboys football team was an American football team that represented the University of Wyoming as a member of the Rocky Mountain Conference (RMC) during the 1931 college football season. In their second season under head coach John Rhodes, the Cowboys compiled a 6–4 record (3–2 against RMC opponents), tied for fourth place in the conference, and outscored opponents by a total of 170 to 75.

The 1931 team had the only winning record for the Wyoming football program between 1925 and 1949.

On October 24, 1931, Wyoming's athletic ground was dedicated as Corbett Field in honor of the school's longtime coach and athletic director, John Corbett.

At the end of the season, two Wyoming players received honors on the Associated Press All-Rocky Mountain Conference football team. Halfback Carl Dir received second-team honors, and tackle Clarence Smith received third-team honors.

== Schedule ==
Date	Opponent	Site	Result	Attendance	Source
September 19	at Fort F.E. Warren*	Corbett Field; Laramie, WY	W 59–0		
September 26	Chadron Normal*	Corbett Field; Laramie, WY	W 25–0		
October 3	at Creighton*	Creighton Stadium; Omaha, NE	L 0–3		
October 10	at Colorado Teachers	Greeley, CO	W 13–6		
October 17	at Montana State	Gatton Field; Bozeman, MT	W 32–13		
October 24	Utah State^{†}	Corbett Field; Laramie, WY (rivalry)	L 0–12	4,500	
November 7	Colorado Agricultural	Corbett Field; Laramie, WY (rivalry)	L 6–26		
November 13	at BYU	BYU Stadium; Provo, UT	W 13–7	3,000	
November 21	Santa Clara*	Warren Bowl; Cheyenne, WY	L 0–6		
November 26	at New Mexico*	University Field; Albuquerque, NM	W 12–2		
*Non-conference game; ^{†}Homecoming
