= 1931 Montana Grizzlies football team =

American college football season

1931 Montana Grizzlies football
- Conference: Pacific Coast Conference
- Record: 1–6 (0–5 PCC)
- Head coach: Bunny Oakes (1st season)
- Home stadium: Dornblaser Field

1931 Pacific Coast Conference football standings
	Conf.					Overall
Team	W		L		T	W		L		T
No. 1 USC $	7	–	0	–	0	10	–	1	–	0
California	4	–	1	–	0	8	–	2	–	0
Oregon	3	–	1	–	1	6	–	2	–	2
Washington State	4	–	3	–	0	6	–	4	–	0
Washington	3	–	3	–	1	5	–	3	–	1
Stanford	2	–	2	–	1	7	–	2	–	2
Oregon State	1	–	3	–	1	6	–	3	–	1
Idaho	1	–	4	–	0	3	–	4	–	0
UCLA	0	–	3	–	0	3	–	4	–	1
Montana	0	–	5	–	0	1	–	6	–	0
$ – Conference champion; Rankings from Dickinson System

The 1931 Montana Grizzlies football team represented the University of Montana in the 1931 college football season as a member of the Pacific Coast Conference (PCC). The Grizzlies were led by first-year head coach Bunny Oakes, played their home games at Dornblaser Field and finished the season with a record of one win and six losses (1–6, 0–5 PCC).

== Schedule ==
Date	Opponent	Site	Result	Attendance	Source
September 26	Mount St. Charles*	Dornblaser Field; Missoula, MT	L 0–2		
October 3	at Washington	Husky Stadium; Seattle, WA	L 0–25	10,000	
October 10	at Idaho	MacLean Field; Moscow, ID (rivalry)	L 19–21		
October 24	Washington State	Dornblaser Field; Missoula, MT	L 0–13	6,000	
October 31	vs. Montana State*	Clark Park; Butte, MT (rivalry)	W 37–6	7,500	
November 7	at Oregon State	Bell Field; Corvallis, OR	L 0–19		
November 14	at USC	Los Angeles Memorial Coliseum; Los Angeles, CA	L 0–69	20,000	
*Non-conference game
