= 1931 Colorado Agricultural Aggies football team =

American college football season

1931 Colorado Agricultural Aggies football
- Conference: Rocky Mountain Conference
- Record: 5–4 (5–2 RMC)
- Head coach: Harry W. Hughes (21st season)
- Home stadium: Colorado Field

1931 Rocky Mountain Conference football standings
	Conf.					Overall
Team	W		L		T	W		L		T
Utah $	6	–	0	–	0	7	–	2	–	0
Utah State	5	–	2	–	0	6	–	2	–	0
Colorado Agricultural	5	–	2	–	0	5	–	4	–	0
Colorado	3	–	2	–	0	5	–	3	–	0
Wyoming	3	–	2	–	0	6	–	4	–	0
Colorado College	4	–	3	–	0	4	–	4	–	0
BYU	2	–	3	–	0	4	–	4	–	0
Denver	3	–	5	–	0	4	–	6	–	0
Colorado Teachers	2	–	4	–	1	2	–	4	–	1
Western State (CO)	1	–	5	–	0	1	–	6	–	0
Montana State	0	–	2	–	0	1	–	5	–	1
Colorado Mines	0	–	4	–	1	1	–	5	–	1
$ – Conference champion

The 1931 Colorado Agricultural Aggies football team represented Colorado Agricultural College (now known as Colorado State University) in the Rocky Mountain Conference (RMC) during the 1931 college football season. In their 21st season under head coach Harry W. Hughes, the Aggies compiled a 5–4 record (5–2 against conference opponents), tied for second place in the RMC, and were outscored by a total of 138 to 137.

== Schedule ==
Date	Opponent	Site	Result	Attendance	Source
September 26	at Kansas*	Memorial Stadium; Lawrence, KS	L 6–27		
October 10	at Colorado College	Washburn Field; Colorado Springs, CO	W 32–6		
October 24	Colorado	Colorado Field; Fort Collins, CO (rivalry)	W 19–6		
October 31	at Utah	Ute Stadium; Salt Lake City, UT	L 6–60		
November 7	at Wyoming	Corbett Field; Laramie, WY (rivalry)	W 26–6		
November 14	Utah State	Colorado Field; Fort Collins, CO	L 0–6		
November 26	at Denver	Denver University Stadium; Denver, CO	W 20–0	15,000	
December 1	Colorado Teachers	Colorado Field; Fort Collins, CO	W 21–7		
December 5	vs. Nebraska*	DU Stadium; Denver, CO	L 7–20	12,000–15,000	
*Non-conference game
