= 1931 Washington State Cougars football team =

American college football season

1931 Washington State Cougars football
- Conference: Pacific Coast Conference
- Record: 6–4 (4–3 PCC)
- Head coach: Babe Hollingbery (6th season)
- Captain: Turk Edwards
- Home stadium: Rogers Field

1931 Pacific Coast Conference football standings
	Conf.					Overall
Team	W		L		T	W		L		T
No. 1 USC $	7	–	0	–	0	10	–	1	–	0
California	4	–	1	–	0	8	–	2	–	0
Oregon	3	–	1	–	1	6	–	2	–	2
Washington State	4	–	3	–	0	6	–	4	–	0
Washington	3	–	3	–	1	5	–	3	–	1
Stanford	2	–	2	–	1	7	–	2	–	2
Oregon State	1	–	3	–	1	6	–	3	–	1
Idaho	1	–	4	–	0	3	–	4	–	0
UCLA	0	–	3	–	0	3	–	4	–	1
Montana	0	–	5	–	0	1	–	6	–	0
$ – Conference champion; Rankings from Dickinson System

The 1931 Washington State Cougars football team was an American football team that represented Washington State College during the 1931 college football season. Head coach Babe Hollingbery led the team to a 6–4 overall record, 4–3 in the Pacific Coast Conference (PCC).

== Schedule ==
Date	Opponent	Site	Result	Attendance	Source
September 26	College of Idaho*	Rogers Field; Pullman, WA	W 41–0	4,000	
October 3	UCLA	Rogers Field; Pullman, WA	W 13–0	10,000	
October 10	at USC	Los Angeles Memorial Coliseum; Los Angeles, CA	L 6–38	30,000	
October 17	vs. California	Multnomah Stadium; Portland, OR	L 7–13	12,000	
October 24	at Montana	Dornblaser Field; Missoula, NT	W 13–0	6,000	
October 31	at Oregon State	Multnomah Stadium; Portland, OR	W 7–6	15,000	
November 7	Idaho	Rogers Field; Pullman, WA (rivalry)	W 9–8	10,000	
November 14	at Washington	Husky Stadium; Seattle, WA (rivalry)	L 0–12	20,000	
November 21	at Gonzaga*	Gonzaga Stadium; Spokane, WA	W 13–6	10,000	
December 5	at Tulane*	Tulane Stadium; New Orleans, LA	L 14–28	20,000	
*Non-conference game
