= 1931 New Mexico A&M Aggies football team =

American college football season

1931 New Mexico A&M Aggies football
- Conference: Border Conference
- Record: 6–4 (1–2 Border)
- Head coach: Jerry Hines (3rd season)
- Home stadium: Miller Field

1931 Border Conference football standings
	Conf.					Overall
Team	W		L		T	W		L		T
Arizona State $	3	–	0	–	0	6	–	2	–	0
New Mexico	1	–	1	–	1	3	–	3	–	1
Arizona	1	–	1	–	1	3	–	5	–	1
New Mexico A&M	1	–	2	–	0	6	–	4	–	0
Arizona State–Flagstaff	1	–	3	–	0	3	–	5	–	0
$ – Conference champion; Arizona State and Arizona State–Flagstaff played twice, but only the first meeting counted in the conference standings.

The 1931 New Mexico A&M Aggies football team was an American football team that represented New Mexico College of Agriculture and Mechanical Arts (now known as New Mexico State University) as a member of the Border Conference during the 1931 college football season. In its third year under head coach Jerry Hines, the team compiled a 7–1–2 record, finished last in the conference, and outscored all opponents by a total of 149 to 90.

== Schedule ==
Date	Opponent	Site	Result	Attendance	Source
September 19	El Paso National Guard	Miller Field; Las Cruces, NM	W 13–0		
September 26	at New Mexico Normal	Las Vegas, NM	W 33–6		
October 3	Texas Tech	Miller Field; Las Cruces, NM	L 0–7		
October 10	at Arizona State–Flagstaff	Skidmore Field; Flagstaff, AZ	L 6–13		
October 17	at Arizona State	Irish Field; Tempe, AZ	L 7–25		
October 30	Gila Junior College	Miller Field; Las Cruces, NM	W 45–0		
November 7	New Mexico^{†}	Miller Field; Las Cruces, NM (rivalry)	W 13–6		
November 13	Wayland	Miller Field; Las Cruces, NM	W 20–6		
November 21	at Texas Mines	El Paso High School Stadium; El Paso, TX (rivalry)	L 0–20		
November 26	New Mexico Military	Miller Field; Las Cruces, NM	W 12–7	5,000	
^{†}Homecoming
