= 1931 Montana State Bobcats football team =

American college football season

1931 Montana State Bobcats football
- Conference: Rocky Mountain Conference
- Record: 1–5–1 (0–2 RMC)
- Head coach: Schubert R. Dyche (4th season)
- Home stadium: Gatton Field

1931 Rocky Mountain Conference football standings
	Conf.					Overall
Team	W		L		T	W		L		T
Utah $	6	–	0	–	0	7	–	2	–	0
Utah State	5	–	2	–	0	6	–	2	–	0
Colorado Agricultural	5	–	2	–	0	5	–	4	–	0
Colorado	3	–	2	–	0	5	–	3	–	0
Wyoming	3	–	2	–	0	6	–	4	–	0
Colorado College	4	–	3	–	0	4	–	4	–	0
BYU	2	–	3	–	0	4	–	4	–	0
Denver	3	–	5	–	0	4	–	6	–	0
Colorado Teachers	2	–	4	–	1	2	–	4	–	1
Colorado Mines	0	–	4	–	1	1	–	5	–	1
Western State (CO)	1	–	5	–	0	1	–	6	–	0
Montana State	0	–	2	–	0	1	–	5	–	1
$ – Conference champion

The 1931 Montana State Bobcats football team was an American football team that represented Montana State College (later renamed Montana State University) in the Rocky Mountain Conference (RMC) during the 1931 college football season. In its fourth season under head coach Schubert R. Dyche, the team compiled a 1–5–1 record (0–2 against RMC opponents) and was outscored by a total of 141 to 45.

== Schedule ==
Date	Opponent	Site	Result	Attendance	Source
September 19	Anaconda Anodes	Gatton Field; Bozeman, MT	W 13–0		
September 26	Saint Mary's (MN)	Gatton Field; Bozeman, MT	T 7–7		
October 3	at Utah State	Aggie Stadium; Logan, UT	L 6–21		
October 10	at Gonzaga*	Gonzaga Stadium; Spokane, WA	L 0–38	7,500	
October 17	Wyoming	Gatton Field; Bozeman, MT	L 13–32		
October 24	vs. Montana	Clark Park; Butte, MT (rivalry)	L 6–37	7,500	
November 11	at Mount St. Charles*	Helena, MT	L 0–6	2,500	
*Non-conference game
