= 1931 Caltech Engineers football team =

College football season

1931 Caltech Engineers football

SCC champion
- Conference: Southern California Conference
- Record: 6–2–1 (5–1 SCC)
- Head coach: Fox Stanton (11th season)

1931 Southern California Conference football standings
	Conf.					Overall
Team	W		L		T	W		L		T
Caltech $	5	–	1	–	0	6	–	2	–	1
Whittier	4	–	1	–	0	6	–	3	–	0
Occidental	3	–	2	–	0	3	–	4	–	1
Redlands	3	–	3	–	1	4	–	3	–	1
San Diego State	2	–	2	–	1	5	–	3	–	2
Pomona	2	–	3	–	0	2	–	6	–	0
La Verne	1	–	3	–	0	4	–	3	–	1
Santa Barbara State	0	–	5	–	0	1	–	5	–	1
$ – Conference champion

The 1931 Caltech Engineers football team was an American football team that represented the California Institute of Technology in the Southern California Conference (SCC) during the 1931 college football season. In their 11th season under head coach Fox Stanton, the team compiled a 6–2–1 record, won the SCC championship, and outscored all opponents by a total of 122 to 53.

Halfback George "Red" Watson was the team captain. Watson was also selected by the conference coaches as a first-team player on the All-SCC team. Guard Phil Craig and end Ed Hayes were named to the second team. Other players included halfback Jack De Milita and tackle Bill Shuler (son of the noted radio personality "Fighting Bob" Shuler).

== Schedule ==
Date	Opponent	Site	Result	Source
September 25	Santa Barbara State	Peabody Stadium; Santa Barbara, CA	W 31–0	
October 3	at Arizona State–Flagstaff*	Flagstaff, AZ	W 13–0	
October 10	Pasadena*	Tournament Park; Pasadena, CA	T 13–13	
October 16	Occidental	Rose Bowl; Pasadena, CA	L 0–13	
October 23	Redlands	Tournament Park; Pasadena, CA	W 6–0	
October 30	at La Verne	La Verne, CA	W 20–6	
November 7	Pomona	Rose Bowl; Pasadena, CA	W 26–0	
November 13	at Loyola (CA)*	Wrigley Field; Los Angeles, CA	L 0–21	
November 26	at San Diego State	Navy "Sports" Field; San Diego, CA	W 13–0	
*Non-conference game
