= Fred Enke =

American athlete, coach, and administrator (1897–1985)

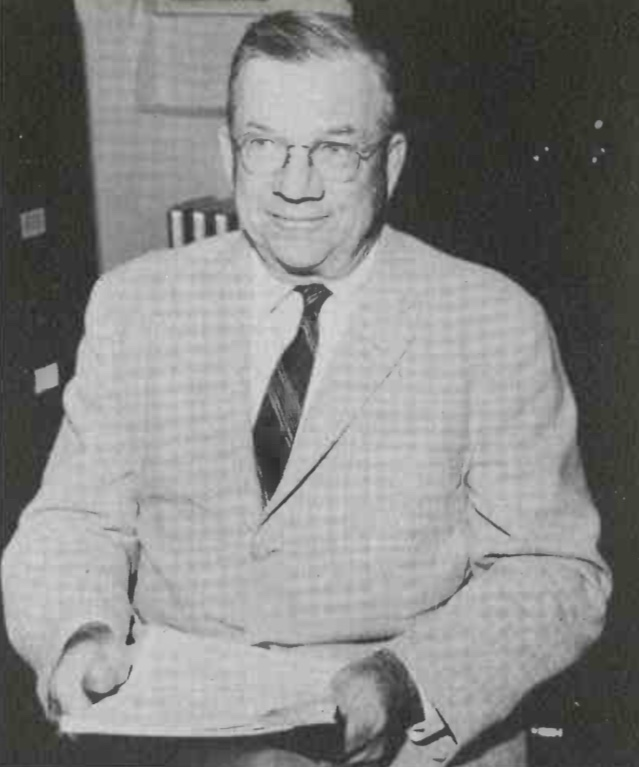
- Enke at the University of Arizona, c. 1960

Biographical details
- Born: July 12, 1897; Rochester, Minnesota, U.S.
- Died: November 2, 1985 (aged 88); Casa Grande, Arizona, U.S.

Playing career

Football
- 1918–1920: Minnesota

Basketball
- 1919–1921: Minnesota
- Position: Tackle (football)

Coaching career (HC unless noted)

Football
- 1922: South Dakota State (assistant)
- 1923–1924: Louisville
- 1925–1930: Arizona (assistant)
- 1931: Arizona
- 1932–1962: Arizona (assistant)

Basketball
- 1923–1925: Louisville
- 1925–1961: Arizona

Baseball
- 1924–1925: Louisville

Golf
- 1935–1967: Arizona

Administrative career (AD unless noted)
- 1923–1925: Louisville

Head coaching record
- Overall: 11–13–2 (football); 523–344 (basketball); 7–6 (baseball); 209–101–13 (golf)
- Tournaments: Basketball; 0–1 (NCAA); 0–3 (NIT)

Accomplishments and honors

Championships
- Basketball; 12 Border (1932, 1933, 1936, 1940, 1943, 1946–1951, 1953)

Fred August Enke (July 12, 1897 – November 2, 1985) was an American football and basketball player, coach of football, basketball, baseball, and golf, and college athletics administrator. The Rochester, Minnesota native coached basketball for two seasons at the University of Louisville (1923–1925) and 36 seasons at the University of Arizona (1925–1961), compiling a career college basketball record of 522–344 (.603). Enke also spent two seasons as head football coach at Louisville (1923–1924) and one season as the head football coach at Arizona (1931), tallying a career college football mark of 11–13–2. In addition, he was the head baseball coach at Louisville for two seasons (1924–1925) and the school's athletic director from 1923 to 1925. Enke's son, Fred William Enke, played seven seasons in the National Football League (NFL).

The street Enke Drive, on the University of Arizona campus is named in honor of Fred A. Enke. There is also the Fred Enke golf course in far eastern Tucson.

== Head coaching record ==
=== Football ===
Year	Team	Overall	Conference	Standing	Bowl/playoffs
Louisville Cardinals (Southern Intercollegiate Athletic Association) (1923–1924)
1923	Louisville	5–3			
1924	Louisville	3–5–1			
Louisville:		8–8–1			
Arizona Wildcats (Border Conference) (1931)
1931	Arizona	3–5–1	1–1–1	T–2nd	
Arizona:		3–5–1	1–1–1		
Total:		11–13–2			

=== Basketball ===
Record table
Season	Team	Overall	Conference	Standing	Postseason
Louisville Cardinals (Independent) (1923–1925)
1923–24	Louisville	4–13			
1924–25	Louisville	10–7			
Louisville:		14–20 (.412)			
Arizona Wildcats (Independent) (1925–1931)
1925–26	Arizona	6–7			
1926–27	Arizona	13–4			
1927–28	Arizona	13–3			
1928–29	Arizona	19–4			
1929–30	Arizona	15–6			
1930–31	Arizona	9–6			
Arizona Wildcats (Border Conference) (1931–1961)
1931–32	Arizona	18–2	8–2	1st	
1932–33	Arizona	19–5	7–3	2nd	
1933–34	Arizona	18–9	9–3	2nd	
1934–35	Arizona	11–8	5–7	4th	
1935–36	Arizona	16–7	11–5	1st	
1936–37	Arizona	14–11	9–7	3rd	
1937–38	Arizona	13–8	9–7	2nd	
1938–39	Arizona	12–11	8–10	5th	
1939–40	Arizona	15–10	12–4	T–1st	
1940–41	Arizona	11–7			
1941–42	Arizona	9–13	6–10	T–6th	
1942–43	Arizona	22–2	11–1	2nd	
1943–44	Arizona	12–2			
1944–45	Arizona	7–11	3–4	6th	
1945–46	Arizona	25–5	13–2	1st	NIT Quarterfinal
1946–47	Arizona	21–3	14–2	1st	
1947–48	Arizona	19–10	12–4	1st	
1948–49	Arizona	17–11	13–3	1st	
1949–50	Arizona	26–5	14–2	1st	NIT First Round
1950–51	Arizona	24–6	15–1	1st	NCAA first round, NIT Quarterfinal
1951–52	Arizona	11–16	6–8	T–4th	
1952–53	Arizona	15–11	11–3	T–1st	
1953–54	Arizona	14–10	8–4	3rd	
1954–55	Arizona	8–17	3–9	6th	
1955–56	Arizona	11–15	6–6	T–4th	
1956–57	Arizona	13–13	5–5	3rd	
1957–58	Arizona	10–15	4–6	T–4th	
1958–59	Arizona	4–22	1–9	6th	
1959–60	Arizona	10–14	4–6	4th	
1960–61	Arizona	11–15	5–5	3rd	
Arizona:		509–324 (.611)	232–138 (.627)		
Total:		523–344 (.603)			
National champion Postseason invitational champion Conference regular season champion Conference regular season and conference tournament champion Division regular season champion Division regular season and conference tournament champion Conference tournament champion
