= 1931 Idaho Vandals football team =

American college football season

1931 Idaho Vandals football
- Conference: Pacific Coast Conference
- Record: 3–4 (1–4 PCC)
- Head coach: Leo Calland (3rd season)
- Home stadium: MacLean Field

1931 Pacific Coast Conference football standings
	Conf.					Overall
Team	W		L		T	W		L		T
No. 1 USC $	7	–	0	–	0	10	–	1	–	0
California	4	–	1	–	0	8	–	2	–	0
Oregon	3	–	1	–	1	6	–	2	–	2
Washington State	4	–	3	–	0	6	–	4	–	0
Washington	3	–	3	–	1	5	–	3	–	1
Stanford	2	–	2	–	1	7	–	2	–	2
Oregon State	1	–	3	–	1	6	–	3	–	1
Idaho	1	–	4	–	0	3	–	4	–	0
UCLA	0	–	3	–	0	3	–	4	–	1
Montana	0	–	5	–	0	1	–	6	–	0
$ – Conference champion; Rankings from Dickinson System

The 1931 Idaho Vandals football team represented the University of Idaho in the 1931 college football season. The Vandals were led by third-year head coach Leo Calland, and were members of the Pacific Coast Conference. Home games were played on campus in Moscow at MacLean Field, with none in Boise this season.

Idaho compiled a 3–4 overall record and lost all but one of its five games in the PCC. The Vandals were led on the field by undersized sophomore quarterback Wee Willie Smith, then known as "Little Giant" Willis Smith of Boise. Three years later in 1934, he was a backup in the NFL with the New York Giants in their championship season.

In the Battle of the Palouse with neighbor Washington State, the Vandals suffered a fourth straight loss, falling by one point at Rogers Field in Pullman on November 7. Idaho's most recent win in the series was six years earlier in 1925 and the next was 23 years away in 1954.

== Schedule ==
Date	Opponent	Site	Result	Attendance	Source
September 26	Whitman*	MacLean Field; Moscow, ID	W 32–7		
October 3	at Oregon	Multnomah Stadium; Portland, OR	L 0–9	10,000	
October 10	Montana	MacLean Field; Moscow, ID (rivalry)	W 21–19		
October 17	at Washington	Husky Stadium; Seattle, WA	L 7–38	10,000	
October 31	Gonzaga*^{†}	MacLean Field; Moscow, ID (rivalry)	W 7–6	5,000	
November 7	at Washington State	Rogers Field; Pullman, WA (Battle of the Palouse)	L 8–9	10,000	
November 14	at California	California Memorial Stadium; Berkeley, CA	L 0–18	15,000	
*Non-conference game; ^{†}Homecoming

== All-conference ==
No Vandals were named to the All-Coast team; honorable mention were center Arthur Spaugy, guard Elmer Martin, and sophomore quarterback Willis Smith.
