= 1931 Washington Huskies football team =

American college football season

1931 Washington Huskies football
- Conference: Pacific Coast Conference
- Record: 5–3–1 (3–3–1 PCC)
- Head coach: Jimmy Phelan (2nd season)
- Captain: Paul Schwegler
- Home stadium: University of Washington Stadium

1931 Pacific Coast Conference football standings
	Conf.					Overall
Team	W		L		T	W		L		T
No. 1 USC $	7	–	0	–	0	10	–	1	–	0
California	4	–	1	–	0	8	–	2	–	0
Oregon	3	–	1	–	1	6	–	2	–	2
Washington State	4	–	3	–	0	6	–	4	–	0
Washington	3	–	3	–	1	5	–	3	–	1
Stanford	2	–	2	–	1	7	–	2	–	2
Oregon State	1	–	3	–	1	6	–	3	–	1
Idaho	1	–	4	–	0	3	–	4	–	0
UCLA	0	–	3	–	0	3	–	4	–	1
Montana	0	–	5	–	0	1	–	6	–	0
$ – Conference champion; Rankings from Dickinson System

The 1931 Washington Huskies football team was an American football team that represented the University of Washington during the 1931 college football season. In its second season under head coach Jimmy Phelan, the team compiled a 5–3–1 record, finished in fifth place in the Pacific Coast Conference, and outscored all opponents by a combined total of 166 to 83. Paul Schwegler was the team captain.

== Schedule ==
Date	Opponent	Site	Result	Attendance	Source
September 26	Utah*	University of Washington Stadium; Seattle, WA	W 7–6	24,000	
October 3	Montana	University of Washington Stadium; Seattle, WA	W 25–0	10,000	
October 10	Oregon	University of Washington Stadium; Seattle, WA (rivalry)	L 0–13	35,000	
October 17	Idaho	University of Washington Stadium; Seattle, WA	W 38–7	10,000	
October 24	Stanford	University of Washington Stadium; Seattle, WA	T 0–0	20,000	
October 31	Whitman*	University of Washington Stadium; Seattle, WA	W 77–0	5,000	
November 7	at California	California Memorial Stadium; Berkeley, CA	L 0–13	30,000	
November 14	Washington State	University of Washington Stadium; Seattle, WA (rivalry)	W 12–0	20,000	
December 5	at USC	Los Angeles Memorial Coliseum; Los Angeles, CA	L 7–44	55,000	
*Non-conference game
