= Bill Jones (Notre Dame football coach) =

American football player and coach

Playing career
- 1926–1927: Notre Dame
- Position: Guard

Coaching career (HC unless noted)
- 1929–1930: Notre Dame (freshmen)
- 1931–1932: Mount St. Charles / Carroll (MT)

Head coaching record
- Overall: 9–2

Bill Jones was an American college football player and coach. He served as the head football coach at Carroll College in Helena, Montana, from 1931 to 1932. Prior to that, he was a player (1926 to 1927) and assistant coach (1929 to 1930) at the University of Notre Dame under head coach Knute Rockne.

== Head coaching record ==
Year	Team	Overall	Conference	Standing	Bowl/playoffs
Mount St. Charles / Carroll Fighting Saints (Independent) (1931–1932)
1931	Mount St. Charles	6–0			
1932	Carroll	3–2			
Carroll:		9–2			
Total:		9–2			
