= 1931 Colorado Mines Orediggers football team =

American college football season

1931 Colorado Mines Orediggers football
- Conference: Rocky Mountain Conference
- Record: 1–5–1 (0–4–1 RMC)
- Head coach: George H. Allen (5th season)
- Home stadium: Brooks Field

1931 Rocky Mountain Conference football standings
	Conf.					Overall
Team	W		L		T	W		L		T
Utah $	6	–	0	–	0	7	–	2	–	0
Utah State	5	–	2	–	0	6	–	2	–	0
Colorado Agricultural	5	–	2	–	0	5	–	4	–	0
Colorado	3	–	2	–	0	5	–	3	–	0
Wyoming	3	–	2	–	0	6	–	4	–	0
Colorado College	4	–	3	–	0	4	–	4	–	0
BYU	2	–	3	–	0	4	–	4	–	0
Denver	3	–	5	–	0	4	–	6	–	0
Colorado Teachers	2	–	4	–	1	2	–	4	–	1
Colorado Mines	0	–	4	–	1	1	–	5	–	1
Western State (CO)	1	–	5	–	0	1	–	6	–	0
Montana State	0	–	2	–	0	1	–	5	–	1
$ – Conference champion

The 1931 Colorado Mines Orediggers football team was an American football team that represented Colorado School of Mines during the 1931 college football season as a member of the Rocky Mountain Conference. In their fifth year under head coach George H. Allen, the team compiled a 1–5–1 record.

== Schedule ==
Date	Opponent	Site	Result	Attendance	Source
September 26	Denver	Brooks Field; Golden, CO	L 0–26	> 17,000	
October 10	at Colorado	Colorado Stadium; Boulder, CO	L 0–27		
October 17	at Western State (CO)	Gunnison, CO	L 0–19		
October 23	at Texas Tech*	Tech Field; Lubbock, TX	L 0–46	4,500	
October 31	Kearney Normal*	Brooks Field; Golden, CO	W 7–0		
November 11	at Colorado Teachers	Jackson Field; Greeley, CO	T 12–12		
November 26	at Colorado College	Washburn Field; Colorado Springs, CO	L 7–20		
*Non-conference game
