= 1931 Colorado Silver and Gold football team =

American college football season

1931 Colorado Silver and Gold football
- Conference: Rocky Mountain Conference
- Record: 5–3 (3–2 RMC)
- Head coach: Myron E. Witham (12th season)
- Captain: Paul Sawyer
- Home stadium: Colorado Stadium

1931 Rocky Mountain Conference football standings
	Conf.					Overall
Team	W		L		T	W		L		T
Utah $	6	–	0	–	0	7	–	2	–	0
Utah State	5	–	2	–	0	6	–	2	–	0
Colorado Agricultural	5	–	2	–	0	5	–	4	–	0
Colorado	3	–	2	–	0	5	–	3	–	0
Wyoming	3	–	2	–	0	6	–	4	–	0
Colorado College	4	–	3	–	0	4	–	4	–	0
BYU	2	–	3	–	0	4	–	4	–	0
Denver	3	–	5	–	0	4	–	6	–	0
Colorado Teachers	2	–	4	–	1	2	–	4	–	1
Colorado Mines	0	–	4	–	1	1	–	5	–	1
Western State (CO)	1	–	5	–	0	1	–	6	–	0
Montana State	0	–	2	–	0	1	–	5	–	1
$ – Conference champion

The 1931 Colorado Silver and Gold football team was an American football team that represented the University of Colorado as a member of the Rocky Mountain Conference (RMC) during the 1931 college football season. Led by Myron E. Witham in his 12th and final season as head coach, Colorado compiled an overall record of 5–3 with a mark of 3–2 in conference play, tying for fourth place in the RMC.

== Schedule ==
Date	Opponent	Site	Result	Attendance	Source
September 26	at Oregon State*	Multnomah Stadium; Portland, OR	L 0–16	23,000	
October 10	Colorado Mines	Colorado Stadium; Boulder, CO	W 27–0		
October 17	Missouri*	Colorado Stadium; Boulder, CO	W 9–7		
October 24	at Colorado Agricultural	Colorado Field; Fort Collins, CO (rivalry)	L 6–19		
November 7	Denver^{†}	Colorado Stadium; Boulder, CO	W 25–6	10,000	
November 14	at Utah	Ute Stadium; Salt Lake City UT (rivalry)	L 0–32		
November 21	Colorado College	Colorado Stadium; Boulder, CO	W 17–7		
November 26	at Arizona*	Arizona Stadium; Tucson, AZ	W 27–7	2,500	
*Non-conference game; ^{†}Homecoming
