= 1931 UCLA Bruins football team =

American college football season

1931 UCLA Bruins football
- Conference: Pacific Coast Conference
- Record: 3–4–1 (0–3 PCC)
- Head coach: William H. Spaulding (7th season)
- Home stadium: Los Angeles Memorial Coliseum

1931 Pacific Coast Conference football standings
	Conf.					Overall
Team	W		L		T	W		L		T
No. 1 USC $	7	–	0	–	0	10	–	1	–	0
California	4	–	1	–	0	8	–	2	–	0
Oregon	3	–	1	–	1	6	–	2	–	2
Washington State	4	–	3	–	0	6	–	4	–	0
Washington	3	–	3	–	1	5	–	3	–	1
Stanford	2	–	2	–	1	7	–	2	–	2
Oregon State	1	–	3	–	1	6	–	3	–	1
Idaho	1	–	4	–	0	3	–	4	–	0
UCLA	0	–	3	–	0	3	–	4	–	1
Montana	0	–	5	–	0	1	–	6	–	0
$ – Conference champion; Rankings from Dickinson System

The 1931 UCLA Bruins football team was an American football team that represented the University of California, Los Angeles during the 1931 college football season. In their seventh year under head coach William H. Spaulding, the Bruins compiled a 3–4–1 record (0–3 conference) and finished in ninth place, ahead only of the bottom-placed Montana, in the Pacific Coast Conference.

== Schedule ==
Date	Opponent	Site	Result	Attendance	Source
September 25	Occidental*	Los Angeles Memorial Coliseum; Los Angeles, CA	T 0–0	10,000	
October 3	at Washington State	Rogers Field; Pullman, WA	L 0–13	10,000	
October 17	at Northwestern*	Dyche Stadium; Evanston, IL	L 0–19	35,000	
October 24	at Pomona*	Claremont, CA	W 46–0		
October 31	at Stanford	Stanford Stadium; Stanford, CA	L 6–12	10,000	
November 11	Saint Mary's*	Los Angeles Memorial Coliseum; Los Angeles, CA	W 12–0	50,000	
November 21	Oregon	Los Angeles Memorial Coliseum; Los Angeles, CA	L 6–13	15,000	
November 26	Florida*	Los Angeles Memorial Coliseum; Los Angeles, CA	W 13–0	20,000	
*Non-conference game
