= 1931 California Golden Bears football team =

American college football season

1931 California Golden Bears football
- Conference: Pacific Coast Conference
- Record: 8–2 (4–1 PCC)
- Head coach: Bill Ingram (1st season)
- Home stadium: California Memorial Stadium

1931 Pacific Coast Conference football standings
	Conf.					Overall
Team	W		L		T	W		L		T
No. 1 USC $	7	–	0	–	0	10	–	1	–	0
California	4	–	1	–	0	8	–	2	–	0
Oregon	3	–	1	–	1	6	–	2	–	2
Washington State	4	–	3	–	0	6	–	4	–	0
Washington	3	–	3	–	1	5	–	3	–	1
Stanford	2	–	2	–	1	7	–	2	–	2
Oregon State	1	–	3	–	1	6	–	3	–	1
Idaho	1	–	4	–	0	3	–	4	–	0
UCLA	0	–	3	–	0	3	–	4	–	1
Montana	0	–	5	–	0	1	–	6	–	0
$ – Conference champion; Rankings from Dickinson System

The 1931 California Golden Bears football team was an American football team that represented the University of California, Berkeley during the 1931 college football season. Under head coach Bill Ingram, the team compiled an overall record of 8–2 and 4–1 in conference.

== Schedule ==
Date	Opponent	Site	Result	Attendance	Source
September 26	Santa Clara*	California Memorial Stadium; Berkeley, CA	W 6–2		
October 3	Saint Mary's*	California Memorial Stadium; Berkeley, CA	L 0–14	70,000	
October 10	Olympic Club*	California Memorial Stadium; Berkeley, CA	W 6–0		
October 17	vs. Washington State	Multnomah Stadium; Portland, OR	W 13–7	12,000	
October 24	USC	California Memorial Stadium; Berkeley, CA	L 0–6	53,957	
October 31	Nevada*	California Memorial Stadium; Berkeley, CA	W 25–6		
November 7	Washington	California Memorial Stadium; Berkeley, CA	W 13–0	30,000	
November 14	Idaho	California Memorial Stadium; Berkeley, CA	W 18–0	15,000	
November 21	at Stanford	Stanford Stadium; Stanford, CA (Big Game)	W 6–0		
December 26	at Georgia Tech*	Grant Field; Atlanta, GA	W 19–6		
*Non-conference game
