= Chuck Riley (American football) =

American football player and coach (1902–1971)

Biographical details
- Born: May 13, 1902; Indianapolis, Indiana, U.S.
- Died: July 19, 1971 (aged 69); Indianapolis, Indiana, U.S.
- Education: Notre Dame (1928)

Playing career
- 1927: Notre Dame
- Positions: Quarterback, punt returner

Coaching career (HC unless noted)
- 1930: Loyola (CA) (assistant)
- 1931–1933: New Mexico

Head coaching record
- Overall: 7–13–3

Charles C. Riley (May 13, 1902 – July 19, 1971) was an American football player and coach. He was born in Indianapolis, Indiana.

Riley was the starting quarterback and punt returner for most of the 1927 season at the University of Notre Dame. He is mostly remembered for his last game with the team—a controversial 7–6 victory against USC at Soldier Field in Chicago before the largest crowd ever to witness a football game at that time, estimated to be 120,000 in attendance.

While clinging to the one-point lead late in the game, Riley fielded a USC punt at his own goal line and appeared to fumble it out of the end zone, which would have given the Trojans a safety and an 8–7 lead. But the play was ruled a muff, and therefore a touchback. Notre Dame would hang on for the win.

In 1930, Riley was hired by fellow Notre Dame alum Tom Lieb to be his assistant football coach at Loyola University of Los Angeles. One year later, Riley became the head football coach for the University of New Mexico and remained there for three years, posting a record of 7–13–3. He died on July 19, 1971.

== Head coaching record ==
Year	Team	Overall	Conference	Standing	Bowl/playoffs
New Mexico Lobos (Border Conference) (1931–1933)
1931	New Mexico	3–3–1	1–1–1	T–2nd	
1932	New Mexico	1–6–1	1–3–1	6th	
1933	New Mexico	3–4–1	2–2	T–4th	
New Mexico:		7–13–3	4–6–2		
Total:		7–13–3			
