= 1931 Western State Mountaineers football team =

American college football season

1931 Western State Mountaineers football
- Conference: Rocky Mountain Conference
- Record: 1–6 (1–5 RMC)
- Head coach: Telfer L. Mead (2nd season)

1931 Rocky Mountain Conference football standings
	Conf.					Overall
Team	W		L		T	W		L		T
Utah $	6	–	0	–	0	7	–	2	–	0
Utah State	5	–	2	–	0	6	–	2	–	0
Colorado Agricultural	5	–	2	–	0	5	–	4	–	0
Colorado	3	–	2	–	0	5	–	3	–	0
Wyoming	3	–	2	–	0	6	–	4	–	0
Colorado College	4	–	3	–	0	4	–	4	–	0
BYU	2	–	3	–	0	4	–	4	–	0
Denver	3	–	5	–	0	4	–	6	–	0
Colorado Teachers	2	–	4	–	1	2	–	4	–	1
Colorado Mines	0	–	4	–	1	1	–	5	–	1
Western State (CO)	1	–	5	–	0	1	–	6	–	0
Montana State	0	–	2	–	0	1	–	5	–	1
$ – Conference champion

The 1931 Western State Mountaineers football team was an American football team that represented Western State College of Colorado (now known as Western Colorado University) during the 1931 college football season as a member of the Rocky Mountain Conference (RMC). In its second year under head coach Telfer L. Mead, the team compiled a 1–6 record.

== Schedule ==
Date	Opponent	Site	Result	Source
September 26	at Colorado College	Washburn Field; Colorado Springs, CO	L 3–14	
October 10	at Utah State	Aggie Stadium; Logan, UT	L 20–38	
October 17	Colorado Mines	Gunnison, CO	W 19–0	
October 24	at BYU	BYU Stadium; Provo, UT	L 0–31	
October 31	Denver	Gunnison, CO	L 7–25	
November 11	at Idaho Southern Branch*	Hutchinson Field; Pocatello, ID	L 6–7	
November 26	Colorado Teachers	Gunnison, CO	L 2–13	
*Non-conference game
