= 1931 Nevada Wolf Pack football team =

American college football season

1931 Nevada Wolf Pack football
- Conference: Far Western Conference
- Record: 2–5–2 (2–1–1 FWC)
- Head coach: George Philbrook (3rd season)
- Home stadium: Mackay Field

1931 Far Western Conference football standings
	Conf.					Overall
Team	W		L		T	W		L		T
Pacific (CA)	2	–	1	–	2	5	–	2	–	2
Cal Aggies	2	–	1	–	2	4	–	2	–	2
Chico State	2	–	1	–	1	3	–	4	–	1
Nevada	2	–	1	–	1	2	–	5	–	2
Fresno State	3	–	2	–	0	4	–	6	–	0
San Jose State	0	–	5	–	0	1	–	8	–	0
No champion was named for the 1931 season.

The 1931 Nevada Wolf Pack football team was an American football team that represented the University of Nevada in the Far Western Conference (FWC) during the 1931 college football season. In their third season under head coach George Philbrook, the team compiled a 2–5–2 record (2–1–1 against conference opponents), were outscored by opponents by a total of 134 to 76.

== Schedule ==
Date	Time	Opponent	Site	Result	Attendance	Source
September 26		Presidio of San Francisco*	Mackay Field; Reno, NV	T 0–0		
October 3		BYU*	Mackay Field; Reno, NV	L 14–18		
October 9	8:00 p.m.	at Cal Aggies*	Sacramento Stadium; Sacramento, CA	L 0–12		
October 16		at Pacific (CA)	Baxter Stadium; Stockton, CA	T 0–0		
October 24		Fresno State	Mackay Field; Reno, NV	W 31–13	5,000	
October 31		at California*	California Memorial Stadium; Berkeley, CA	L 6–25		
November 7		at San Jose State	Spartan Field; San Jose, CA	W 18–0		
November 14		at Stanford*	Stanford Stadium; Stanford, CA	L 0–26		
November 21		San Francisco	Mackay Field; Reno, NV	L 7–40		
*Non-conference game; All times are in Pacific time
