= Gene Murphy (American football, born c. 1900) =

American football player and coach

Biographical details
- Born: c. 1900
- Died: 1976; Portland, Oregon, U.S.

Playing career

Football
- 1921–1922: Notre Dame
- Position: Quarterback

Coaching career (HC unless noted)

Football
- 1927–1936: Columbia (OR) / Portland

Basketball
- 1927–1928: Columbia (OR) / Portland

Baseball
- 1927–1935: Columbia (OR) / Portland

Administrative career (AD unless noted)
- 1927–1936: Columbia (OR) / Portland

Head coaching record
- Overall: 59–51 (college baseball)

Eugene L. Murphy (c. 1900 – 1976) was an American football player and coach. He attended Columbia Prep in Portland, Oregon. He played college football for Knute Rockne's Notre Dame Fighting Irish football teams in 1921 and 1922. He coached high school football at the then Sacred Heart College (High School Division; now "Sacred Heart Cathedral Preparatory")in San Francisco for the 1925 season. In June 1927, he was hired as the athletic director and head football and baseball coach at Columbia University (renamed the University of Portland in 1935. He held that position for 10 years from 1927 to 1936. He retired in December 1936 to enter private business. He was posthumously inducted into the University of Portland Hall of Fame in 1991.

== Head coaching record ==
=== College football ===
Year	Team	Overall	Conference	Standing	Bowl/playoffs
Columbia Irish / Portland Pilots (Independent) (1927–1936)
1927	Columbia	1–4			
1928	Columbia				
1929	Columbia				
1930	Columbia	4–2			
1931	Columbia	2–5			
1932	Columbia	6–0–1			
1933	Columbia	4–3			
1934	Columbia	1–6–1			
1935	Portland	3–4			
1936	Portland	3–4			
Columbia / Portland:					
Total:					
