= 1931 Gonzaga Bulldogs football team =

American college football season

1931 Gonzaga Bulldogs football
- Conference: Independent
- Record: 3–4
- Head coach: Mike Pecarovich (1st season)
- Home stadium: Gonzaga Stadium

1931 Western college football independents records
	Conf.			Overall
Team	W	L	T	W		L		T
Mount St. Charles		–		6	–	0	–	0
No. 5 Saint Mary's		–		8	–	2	–	0
Loyola (CA)		–		7	–	2	–	1
San Diego Marines		–		6	–	4	–	0
Hawaii		–		3	–	2	–	1
Santa Clara		–		5	–	4	–	1
San Francisco		–		4	–	4	–	2
San Francisco State		–		2	–	3	–	3
Gonzaga		–		3	–	4	–	0
Humboldt State		–		1	–	2	–	1
Columbia (OR)		–		2	–	5	–	0
Rankings from Dickinson System

The 1931 Gonzaga Bulldogs football team was an American football team that represented Gonzaga University as an independent during the 1931 college football season. In their first year under head coach Mike Pecarovich, the Bulldogs compiled a 3–4 record and outscored opponents by a total of 116 to 59.

== Schedule ==
Date	Opponent	Site	Result	Attendance	Source
October 2	Ellensburg Normal	Gonzaga Stadium; Spokane, WA	W 26–7	5,000	
October 10	Montana State	Gonzaga Stadium; Spokane, WA	W 38–0	7,500	
October 25	vs. Saint Mary's	Kezar Stadium; San Francisco, CA	L 7–13	7,000	
October 31	at Idaho	MacLean Field; Moscow, ID (rivalry)	L 6–7	5,000	
November 8	at San Francisco	Kezar Stadium; San Francisco, CA	W 21–6		
November 21	Washington State	Gonzaga Stadium; Spokane, WA	L 6–13	10,000	
November 26	at West Seattle Athletic Club	Washington Stadium; Seattle, WA	L 12–13	18,000	
