= 1931 Stanford Indians football team =

American college football season

1931 Stanford Indians football
- Conference: Pacific Coast Conference
- Record: 7–2–2 (2–2–1 PCC)
- Head coach: Pop Warner (8th season)
- Offensive scheme: Double-wing
- Home stadium: Stanford Stadium

1931 Pacific Coast Conference football standings
	Conf.					Overall
Team	W		L		T	W		L		T
No. 1 USC $	7	–	0	–	0	10	–	1	–	0
California	4	–	1	–	0	8	–	2	–	0
Oregon	3	–	1	–	1	6	–	2	–	2
Washington State	4	–	3	–	0	6	–	4	–	0
Washington	3	–	3	–	1	5	–	3	–	1
Stanford	2	–	2	–	1	7	–	2	–	2
Oregon State	1	–	3	–	1	6	–	3	–	1
Idaho	1	–	4	–	0	3	–	4	–	0
UCLA	0	–	3	–	0	3	–	4	–	1
Montana	0	–	5	–	0	1	–	6	–	0
$ – Conference champion; Rankings from Dickinson System

The 1931 Stanford football team represented Stanford University in the 1931 college football season. Their head coach was Pop Warner in his eighth season. The team played its home games at Stanford Stadium in Stanford, California. This was the first year the team was officially known as the "Indians." The team had been referred to by that nickname for some time, but the mascot was officially adopted by a unanimous vote by the Executive Committee for the Associated Students at the end of the previous football season.

Stanford's end-of-season game against Dartmouth at Harvard Stadium remains the only time the team played in that stadium; a planned game at Harvard in 1950 was canceled.

== Schedule ==
Date	Opponent	Site	Result	Attendance	Source
September 19	West Coast Army*	Stanford Stadium; Stanford, CA	W 46–0	12,000	
September 26	Olympic Club*	Stanford Stadium; Stanford, CA	T 0–0		
October 3	Santa Clara*	Stanford Stadium; Stanford, CA	W 6–0	25,000	
October 10	Minnesota*	Stanford Stadium; Stanford, CA	W 13–0	32,000	
October 17	Oregon State	Stanford Stadium; Stanford, CA	W 25–7	18,000	
October 24	at Washington	Husky Stadium; Seattle, WA	T 0–0	20,000	
October 31	UCLA	Stanford Stadium; Stanford, CA	W 12–6	10,000	
November 7	at USC	Los Angeles Memorial Coliseum; Los Angeles, CA (rivalry)	L 0–19	93,000	
November 14	Nevada*	Stanford Stadium; Stanford, CA	W 26–0	3,000	
November 21	California	Stanford Stadium; Stanford, CA (Big Game)	L 0–6		
November 28	vs. Dartmouth*	Harvard Stadium; Boston, MA	W 32–6	42,000	
*Non-conference game
