= Portland Pilots football =

Portland Pilots
- First season: 1894
- Last season: 1949
- Location: Portland, Oregon
- Stadium: Multnomah Stadium
- Conference: Independent
- Colors: Purple and white

National championships
- Claimed: 0

Conference championships
- 0

Conference division championships
- 0

The Portland Pilots football team represented the University of Portland in the sport of American football from 1894 to 1896, 1909 to 1942 and 1946 to 1949. Prior to 1935, the school was known as Columbia University, and the football team was known as the "Irish" (due to an affiliation with Notre Dame). The football team was also sometimes known as the "Cliffdwellers".

Prior to 1927, the school operated as a preparatory school and two-year junior college. During that time, the football team competed primarily against small Oregon colleges. Starting in 1928, the football program began competing increasingly against regional powers, including Oregon State (1928-1929, 1934–1935, 1938–1940, 1946–1948), Gonzaga (1933–1937, 1939–1941), Santa Clara (1934–1937, 1946, 1949), Saint Mary's (1938–1941, 1947–1948), Montana State (1938–1939, 1946–1949), Idaho (1942, 1946–1949), Oregon (1933, 1935–1936), Montana (1939–1940, 1947), San Francisco (1936–1937), BYU (1937–1938), Fresno State (1939, 1948), Nevada (1947, 1949), Pepperdine (1948–1949), Hawaii (1941), Arizona State (1946), and Washington State (1947).

Former Notre Dame quarterback Gene Murphy was the head football coach from 1927 to 1936. "Matty" Mathews, another former Notre Dame football player, took over as head coach in 1937 and remained in the position until 1942.

The school suspended its football program during World War II and did not field teams from 1943 to 1945.

The football program returned in 1946. Hal Moe served as head coach from 1946 to 1948. Harry Wright took over as head coach in 1949. In February 1950, the school abandoned its football program in order to focus its efforts on basketball. The school cited the "extraordinary expenses" associated with maintaining a first-rate football program.

== All-Americans ==
- Joseph Enzler, Guard – 1939 (NEA–3rd Team)
