= 1931 Buffalo Bulls football team =

American college football season

1931 Buffalo Bulls football
- Conference: Independent
- Record: 2–6
- Head coach: William Pritchard (1st season)
- Captain: Ed Malanowicz
- Home stadium: Rotary Field

1931 Eastern college football independents records
	Conf.			Overall
Team	W	L	T	W		L		T
Bucknell		–		6	–	0	–	3
Colgate		–		8	–	1	–	0
No. 9 Pittsburgh		–		8	–	1	–	0
Cornell		–		7	–	1	–	0
Drexel		–		7	–	1	–	0
No. 7 Harvard		–		7	–	1	–	0
Temple		–		8	–	1	–	1
Columbia		–		7	–	1	–	1
Massachusetts State		–		7	–	1	–	1
Syracuse		–		7	–	1	–	1
Fordham		–		6	–	1	–	2
No. 8 Yale		–		5	–	1	–	2
Army		–		8	–	2	–	1
Franklin & Marshall		–		6	–	2	–	0
Manhattan		–		4	–	2	–	1
Brown		–		7	–	3	–	0
Providence		–		7	–	3	–	0
Penn		–		6	–	3	–	0
NYU		–		6	–	3	–	1
Boston College		–		6	–	4	–	0
Washington & Jefferson		–		6	–	4	–	0
Tufts		–		3	–	2	–	2
Villanova		–		4	–	3	–	2
La Salle		–		4	–	4	–	0
Duquesne		–		3	–	5	–	3
Carnegie Tech		–		3	–	5	–	1
St. John's		–		3	–	5	–	1
CCNY		–		2	–	5	–	1
Boston University		–		2	–	7	–	0
Penn State		–		2	–	8	–	0
Princeton		–		1	–	7	–	0
Vermont		–		1	–	8	–	0
Rankings from Dickinson System

The 1931 Buffalo Bulls football team was an American football team that represented the University at Buffalo as an independent during the 1931 college football season. In its first season under head coach William Pritchard, the Bulls compiled a 2–6 record and were outscored by a total of 171 to 65. The team played its home games at Rotary Field in Buffalo, New York.

== Schedule ==
Date	Opponent	Site	Result	Attendance	Source
September 26	Carnegie Tech	Rotary Field; Buffalo, NY	L 0–25		
October 3	at Dartmouth	Hanover, NH	L 0–61		
October 10	at Alfred	Alfred, NY	W 20–13		
October 17	at Hamilton	Clinton, NY	L 2–6		
October 24	Clarkson	Rotary Field; Buffalo, NY	L 0–13		
October 31	Rochester	Rotary Field; Buffalo, NY	L 7–14		
November 7	Notre Dame B	Rotary Field; Buffalo, NY	L 6–33		
November 14	at Hobart	Boswell Field; Geneva, NY	W 29–6	1,500	
