= 1931 Dartmouth Indians football team =

American college football season

1931 Dartmouth Indians football
- Conference: Independent
- Record: 5–3–1
- Head coach: Jackson Cannell (5th season)
- Captain: Stanley Yudicky
- Home stadium: Memorial Field

1931 Eastern college football independents records
	Conf.			Overall
Team	W	L	T	W		L		T
Bucknell		–		6	–	0	–	3
Colgate		–		8	–	1	–	0
No. 9 Pittsburgh		–		8	–	1	–	0
Cornell		–		7	–	1	–	0
Drexel		–		7	–	1	–	0
No. 7 Harvard		–		7	–	1	–	0
Temple		–		8	–	1	–	1
Columbia		–		7	–	1	–	1
Massachusetts State		–		7	–	1	–	1
Syracuse		–		7	–	1	–	1
Fordham		–		6	–	1	–	2
No. 8 Yale		–		5	–	1	–	2
Army		–		8	–	2	–	1
Franklin & Marshall		–		6	–	2	–	0
Manhattan		–		4	–	2	–	1
Brown		–		7	–	3	–	0
Providence		–		7	–	3	–	0
Penn		–		6	–	3	–	0
NYU		–		6	–	3	–	1
Boston College		–		6	–	4	–	0
Washington & Jefferson		–		6	–	4	–	0
Tufts		–		3	–	2	–	2
Villanova		–		4	–	3	–	2
La Salle		–		4	–	4	–	0
Duquesne		–		3	–	5	–	3
Carnegie Tech		–		3	–	5	–	1
St. John's		–		3	–	5	–	1
CCNY		–		2	–	5	–	1
Boston University		–		2	–	7	–	0
Penn State		–		2	–	8	–	0
Princeton		–		1	–	7	–	0
Vermont		–		1	–	8	–	0
Rankings from Dickinson System

The 1931 Dartmouth Indians football team was an American football team that represented Dartmouth College as an independent during the 1931 college football season. In their fifth season under head coach Jackson Cannell, the Indians compiled a 5–3–1 record. Stanley Yudicky was the team captain.

Bill McCall was the team's leading scorer, with 90 points, from 15 touchdowns.

Dartmouth played its home games at Memorial Field on the college campus in Hanover, New Hampshire.

== Schedule ==
Date	Opponent	Site	Result	Attendance	Source
September 26	Norwich	Memorial Field; Hanover, NH	W 56–6		
October 3	Buffalo	Memorial Field; Hanover, NH	W 61–0		
October 10	Holy Cross	Memorial Field; Hanover, NH	W 14–7		
October 17	at Columbia	Baker Field; New York, NY	L 6–19	22,000	
October 24	Lebanon Valley	Memorial Field; Hanover, NH	W 20–6		
October 31	at Yale	Yale Bowl; New Haven, CT	T 33–33	35,000	
November 7	at Harvard	Harvard Stadium; Boston, MA (rivalry)	L 6–7	57,000	
November 14	Cornell	Memorial Field; Hanover, NH (rivalry)	W 14–0	12,500	
November 28	vs. Stanford	Harvard Stadium; Boston, MA	L 6–32	42,000	
