= 1931 Holy Cross Crusaders football team =

American college football season

1931 Holy Cross Crusaders football
- Conference: Independent
- Record: 7–2–1
- Head coach: John McEwan (2nd season)
- Home stadium: Fitton Field

1931 Eastern college football independents records
	Conf.			Overall
Team	W	L	T	W		L		T
Bucknell		–		6	–	0	–	3
Colgate		–		8	–	1	–	0
No. 9 Pittsburgh		–		8	–	1	–	0
Cornell		–		7	–	1	–	0
Drexel		–		7	–	1	–	0
No. 7 Harvard		–		7	–	1	–	0
Temple		–		8	–	1	–	1
Columbia		–		7	–	1	–	1
Massachusetts State		–		7	–	1	–	1
Syracuse		–		7	–	1	–	1
Fordham		–		6	–	1	–	2
No. 8 Yale		–		5	–	1	–	2
Army		–		8	–	2	–	1
Franklin & Marshall		–		6	–	2	–	0
Manhattan		–		4	–	2	–	1
Brown		–		7	–	3	–	0
Providence		–		7	–	3	–	0
Penn		–		6	–	3	–	0
NYU		–		6	–	3	–	1
Boston College		–		6	–	4	–	0
Washington & Jefferson		–		6	–	4	–	0
Tufts		–		3	–	2	–	2
Villanova		–		4	–	3	–	2
La Salle		–		4	–	4	–	0
Duquesne		–		3	–	5	–	3
Carnegie Tech		–		3	–	5	–	1
St. John's		–		3	–	5	–	1
CCNY		–		2	–	5	–	1
Boston University		–		2	–	7	–	0
Penn State		–		2	–	8	–	0
Princeton		–		1	–	7	–	0
Vermont		–		1	–	8	–	0
Rankings from Dickinson System

The 1931 Holy Cross Crusaders football team was an American football team that represented the College of the Holy Cross as an independent during the 1931 college football season. In its second season under head coach John McEwan, the team compiled a 7–2–1 record. The team played its home games at Fitton Field in Worcester, Massachusetts.

== Schedule ==
Date	Opponent	Site	Result	Attendance	Source
September 26	St. Bonaventure	Fitton Field; Worcester, MA	W 32–0		
October 3	Providence	Fitton Field; Worcester, MA	W 26–6		
October 10	at Dartmouth	Memorial Field; Hanover, NH	L 7–14		
October 17	at Fordham	Polo Grounds; New York, NY	T 6–6	20,000	
October 24	Rutgers	Fitton Field; Worcester, MA	W 27–0		
October 31	Brown	Fitton Field; Worcester, MA	W 33–0		
November 7	Duquesne	Fitton Field; Worcester, MA	W 12–0		
November 14	at Harvard	Harvard Stadium; Boston, MA	L 0–7		
November 21	Loyola (MD)	Fitton Field; Worcester, MA	W 16–14		
November 26	vs. Boston College	Harvard Stadium; Boston, MA	W 7–6	25,000	
