= Bunny Corcoran =

American football and baseball player (1894–1958)

Biographical details
- Born: November 23, 1894; Roxbury, Massachusetts, U.S.
- Died: July 27, 1958 (aged 63); Chelsea, Massachusetts, U.S.
- Education: Georgetown; Fordham

Playing career

Football
- 1919–1920: Canton Bulldogs
- 1921: Cleveland Indians
- 1921–1922: Akron Pros
- 1923: Buffalo All-Americans
- 1923: Frankford Yellow Jackets
- 1924: Providence Steamrollers
- Position: End/Tailback

Coaching career (HC unless noted)

Football
- 1920: NYU (Ends)
- 1923: Fordham (Ends)
- 1926–1932: Holy Cross (Ends)
- 1932: Holy Cross (interim HC)
- 1939–1942: Virginia (Ends)

Baseball
- 1943: Virginia

Head coaching record
- Overall: 0–1–2 (football); 6–5–1 (baseball)

Bunny Corcoran
- Third Base
- Batted: Unknown Threw: Right

MLB debut
- September 9, 1915, for the Philadelphia Athletics

Last MLB appearance
- September 9, 1915, for the Philadelphia Athletics

MLB statistics
- Plate appearances: 4
- Batting average: .000
- Games played: 1
- Stats at Baseball Reference

Arthur Andrew "Bunny" Corcoran (November 23, 1894 – July 27, 1958) was an American professional football and baseball player. He was a tailback with the Canton Bulldogs, Cleveland Indians, Akron Pros and the Buffalo All-Americans of the National Football League (NFL) and the Frankford Yellow Jackets and the Canton Bulldogs of the Ohio League. In 1915, he appeared in one Major League Baseball game for the Philadelphia Athletics.

== Early life ==
Corcoran was born in Boston and played baseball and football at Princeton Preparatory School (Note: Some sources give Corcoran’s high school as St. John's Preparatory School) and Georgetown University. He received the nickname Bunny in high school due to his speed.

== Playing career ==
=== Baseball ===
In 1915, Corcoran had a solid year for the Queen Quality team in Massachusetts. On September 9, 1915, Philadelphia Athletics manager Connie Mack gave Corcoran a tryout. He put him in the lineup for that day's game at Fenway Park and Corcoran went 0–4 with two strikeouts.

Corcoran played for Fordham in 1917 and 1919 and received a tryout with the Detroit Tigers after a strong year with the Portland Blue Sox of the New England League. Corcoran never again appeared in a major league game, but continued to play minor league baseball until 1921.

=== Football ===
Corcoran played kicker for the 1914 Georgetown Blue and Gray football team and tried out for end the following season. He took over as starter for the team's October 2, 1915 game against Navy. He scored a touchdown in Georgetown's 28–0 victory over the North Carolina A&M Aggies and another in the Hoyas' 61–0 win against South Carolina.

Corcoran transferred to Fordham University and played end for the 1916 Fordham Maroon football team. He enlisted in the United States Navy the following year and was a member of the 1917 Newport Naval Reserves football team.

In 1919, Corcoran played for the Canton Bulldogs, an Ohio League football team managed by Jim Thorpe. In 1920, the Bulldogs moved to the new American Professional Football Association (later renamed the National Football League). In 1921 he followed Thorpe to the Cleveland Indians, where he scored his only NFL touchdown. He played for the Akron Pros in 1921 and 1922, the Buffalo All-Americans in 1922, and the Frankford Yellow Jackets in 1923. In 1924, he was a member of the Providence Steamrollers, then an independent club.

== Coaching ==
Corcoran began his coaching career when he assisted his former Fordham coach Frank Gargan for the first few weeks of the NYU Violets' 1920 football season. In 1923, he and Gargan both returned to Fordham.

In 1926, Corcoran became the ends coach at the College of the Holy Cross. During the Crusaders' November 5, 1932 loss to Brown, head coach John McEwan got into an argument with trainer Bart Sullivan which led to McEwan's indefinite suspension. Corcoran finished the season as interim head coach. He was not retained by McEwan's successor, Eddie Anderson.

In 1939, Corcoran became the ends coach at the University of Virginia. In 1943, he coached the Virginia Cavaliers baseball team while Gus Tebell was serving in the United States Navy.

== Later life ==
Corcoran spent many years as a playground supervisor for the city of Boston and was the director of the Hearst sandlot baseball program in Boston for fourteen years. Bill Monbouquette, Harry Agganis, Tom Gastall, and Frank Leja were among the players that came through the Hearst program under Corcoran.

Corcoran came down with pneumonia in the winter of 1957–58. By April 1958, his heart began to weaken. He died on July 27, 1958 at Quigley Memorial Hospital in Chelsea, Massachusetts. He was buried in St. Joseph Cemetery in West Roxbury, Massachusetts.

== Head coaching record ==
=== Football ===
Year	Team	Overall	Conference	Standing	Bowl/playoffs
Holy Cross Crusaders (Independent) (1932)
1932	Holy Cross	0–1–2 (Note: John McEwan served as Holy Cross's head coach for the first seven games of the 1932 season before he was suspended. Corcoran was appointed interim head coach for the final three games. Holy Cross finished the year with an overall record of 6–2–2.)			
Holy Cross:		0–1–2			
Total:		0–1–2			

=== Baseball ===
Record table
Season	Team	Overall	Conference	Standing	Postseason
Virginia Cavaliers (Independent) (1943)
1943	Virginia	6–5–1			
Virginia:		6–5–1			
Total:		6–5–1			
