= 1931 Connecticut Aggies football team =

American college football season

1931 Connecticut Aggies football
- Conference: New England Conference
- Record: 2–3–3 (0–3 New England)
- Head coach: Sumner Dole (9th season)
- Home stadium: Gardner Dow Athletic Fields

1931 New England Conference football standings
	Conf.					Overall
Team	W		L		T	W		L		T
New Hampshire +	2	–	0	–	0	7	–	2	–	0
Rhode Island State +	2	–	0	–	0	4	–	4	–	0
Maine	1	–	2	–	0	4	–	3	–	0
Connecticut	0	–	3	–	0	2	–	3	–	3
+ – Conference co-champions

The 1931 Connecticut Aggies football team represented Connecticut Agricultural College, now the University of Connecticut, in the 1931 college football season The Aggies were led by ninth-year head coach Sumner Dole, and completed the season with a record of 2–3–3.

== Schedule ==
Date	Opponent	Site	Result	Source
September 19	Arnold*	Gardner Dow Athletic Fields; Storrs, CT	T 6–6	
October 3	at Wesleyan*	Gardner Dow Athletic Fields; Storrs, CT	W 7–0	
October 10	Maine	Gardner Dow Athletic Fields; Storrs, CT	L 0–8	
October 17	at Trinity (CT)*	Trinity Field; Hartford, CT	W 7–0	
October 24	at Tufts*	Medford, MA	T 7–7	
October 31	Coast Guard*	Gardner Dow Athletic Fields; Storrs, CT	T 0–0	
November 7	New Hampshire	Gardner Dow Athletic Fields; Storrs, CT	L 0–49	
November 14	at Rhode Island State	Meade Stadium; Kingston, RI (rivalry)	L 0–14	
*Non-conference game
