= 1931 Rhode Island State Rams football team =

American college football season

1931 Rhode Island State Rams football

New England co-champion
- Conference: New England Conference
- Record: 4–4 (2–0 New England)
- Head coach: Frank Keaney (12th season)

1931 New England Conference football standings
	Conf.					Overall
Team	W		L		T	W		L		T
New Hampshire +	2	–	0	–	0	7	–	2	–	0
Rhode Island State +	2	–	0	–	0	4	–	4	–	0
Maine	1	–	2	–	0	4	–	3	–	0
Connecticut	0	–	3	–	0	2	–	3	–	3
+ – Conference co-champions

The 1931 Rhode Island Rams football team was an American football team that represented Rhode Island State College (later renamed the University of Rhode Island) as a member of the New England Conference during the 1931 college football season. In its 12th season under head coach Frank Keaney, the team compiled a 4–4 record (2–0 against conference opponents) and tied with New Hampshire for the conference championship.

== Schedule ==
Date	Opponent	Site	Result	Source
September 26	at Maine	Alumni Field; Orono, ME	W 8–7	
October 3	at Brown*	Brown Stadium; Providence, RI (rivalry)	L 0–18	
October 17	at Bates*	Garcelon Field; Lewiston, ME	L 0–3	
October 24	Coast Guard^{†}*	Meade Stadium; Kingston, RI	W 33–7	
October 31	at Boston University*	Nickerson Field; Weston, MA	L 7–25	
November 7	at Worcester Tech*		W 34–0	
November 14	Connecticut	Meade Stadium; Kingston, RI (rivalry)	W 14–0	
November 28	at Providence*	Cycledrome; Providence, RI	L 0–6	
*Non-conference game; ^{†}Homecoming
