= William Pritchard (American football) =

American football coach (1901–1978)

Biographical details
- Born: December 23, 1901; Frostburg, Maryland, U.S.
- Died: April 10, 1978 (aged 76); Buffalo, New York, U.S.

Playing career
- 1925–1926: Penn State
- 1927: Providence Steamrollers
- 1928: New York Yankees
- Position: Fullback

Coaching career (HC unless noted)
- 1931: Buffalo

Head coaching record
- Overall: 2–6

William England Pritchard (December 23, 1901 – April 10, 1978) was an American football player and coach and educator. He played college football at Pennsylvania State University and professionally in the National Football League (NFL) with the Providence Steamrollers in 1927 and the New York Yankees in 1928. Pritchard served as the head football coach at the University of Buffalo for one season in 1931, compiling a record of 2–6. He later worked as a teacher and principal for public schools in Buffalo, New York.

== Playing career ==
Pritchard, a native of Frostburg, Maryland, graduated from South Park High School in Buffalo, New York in 1923, where he earned 13 letters in football, baseball, track, basketball, and swimming. He earned his undergraduate degree at Pennsylvania State University, where he played football and lacrosse.

After graduating from Penn State in the spring of 1927, Pritchard played in the National Football League (NFL) with the Providence Steamrollers in 1927 and the New York Yankees in 1928. He returned to Buffalo after his NFL playing days were over and continued to play football for several clubs in the semi-pro Western New York football league.

== Coaching career ==
In 1929, Pritchard was an assistant coach at University of Buffalo, while he worked towards his master's degree in history. In 1931, he agreed to become the head coach of the football program after Jay L. Lee unexpectedly resigned.

== Later years ==
After retiring from coaching, he was a teacher and principal in the Buffalo Public Schools system for 35 years. Pritchard taught in the school system from 1932 to 1950 before going into administrative work. He was principal of the Fosdick-Masten Vocational High School from 1956 to 1962 and Seneca Vocational High School from 1962 until his retirement in 1967.

Pritchard also officiated football games for high schools, colleges, and the All-America Football Conference (AAFC) during its four-year existence.

Pritchard died April 10, 1978, at the age of 76.

== Head coaching record ==
| Year | Team | Overall | Conference | Standing | Bowl/playoffs |
|---|---|---|---|---|---|
Buffalo Bulls (New York State Conference) (1931)
| 1931 | Buffalo | 2–6 | | | |
| Buffalo: | | 2–6 | | | |
| Total: | | 2–6 | | | |
