= 1931 Lehigh Engineers football team =

American college football season

1931 Lehigh Engineers football
- Conference: Middle Three Conference
- Record: 3–7 (0–2 Middle Three)
- Head coach: A. Austin Tate (4th season)
- Captain: A. T. Ware
- Home stadium: Taylor Stadium

1931 Middle Three Conference football standings
	Conf.					Overall
Team	W		L		T	W		L		T
Lafayette $	2	–	0	–	0	7	–	2	–	0
Rutgers	1	–	1	–	0	4	–	3	–	1
Lehigh	0	–	2	–	0	3	–	7	–	0
$ – Conference champion

The 1931 Lehigh Engineers football team was an American football team that represented Lehigh University during the 1931 college football season. In its fourth season under head coach A. Austin Tate, the team compiled a 3–7 record, and lost both games against its Middle Three Conference rivals. Lehigh played home games at Taylor Stadium in Bethlehem, Pennsylvania.

== Schedule ==
Date	Opponent	Site	Result	Attendance	Source
September 26	Ursinus*	Taylor Stadium; Bethlehem, PA	L 7–12		
October 3	Pennsylvania Military*	Taylor Stadium; Bethlehem, PA	W 13–0		
October 10	Johns Hopkins*	Taylor Stadium; Bethlehem, PA	L 12–20		
October 17	at Penn*	Franklin Field; Philadelphia, PA	L 0–32	12,000	
October 24	at Brown*	Brown Stadium; Providence, RI	L 0–33		
October 31	Muhlenberg*	Taylor Stadium; Bethlehem, PA	W 33–0		
November 7	at Princeton*	Palmer Stadium; Princeton, NJ	W 19–7	22,000	
November 14	at Rutgers	Neilson Field; New Brunswick, NJ	L 12–26	7,500	
November 21	Lafayette	Taylor Stadium; Bethlehem, PA (rivalry)	L 7–13	12,000	
November 28	vs. Penn State*	Franklin Field; Philadelphia, PA	L 0–31	2,500	
*Non-conference game
