= 1931 Rutgers Queensmen football team =

American college football season

1931 Rutgers Queensmen football
- Conference: Middle Three Conference
- Record: 4–3–1 (1–1 Middle Three)
- Head coach: J. Wilder Tasker (1st season)
- Captain: Jack Grossman
- Home stadium: Neilson Field

1931 Middle Three Conference football standings
	Conf.					Overall
Team	W		L		T	W		L		T
Lafayette $	2	–	0	–	0	7	–	2	–	0
Rutgers	1	–	1	–	0	4	–	3	–	1
Lehigh	0	–	2	–	0	3	–	7	–	0
$ – Conference champion

The 1931 Rutgers Queensmen football team represented Rutgers University in the 1931 college football season. In their first season under head coach J. Wilder Tasker, the Queensmen compiled a 4–3–1 record and outscored their opponents 111 to 100.

== Schedule ==
Date	Opponent	Site	Result	Attendance	Source
September 26	Providence	Neilson Field; New Brunswick, NJ	W 19–0	9,000	
October 3	Drexel	Neilson Field; New Brunswick, NJ	W 27–6	5,000	
October 10	Springfield	Neilson Field; New Brunswick, NJ	W 26–0	6,000	
October 17	at NYU	Yankee Stadium; Bronx, NY	L 7–27	15,000	
October 24	at Holy Cross	Fitton Field; Worcester, MA	L 0–27		
October 31	Delaware	Neilson Field; New Brunswick, NJ	T 6–6		
November 7	at Lafayette	Fisher Field; Easton, PA	L 0–20		
November 14	Lehigh	Neilson Field; New Brunswick, NJ	W 26–12	7,500	
