= 1931 Lafayette Leopards football team =

American football club

1931 Lafayette Leopards football

Middle Three champion
- Conference: Middle Three Conference
- Record: 7–2 (2–0 Middle Three)
- Head coach: Herb McCracken (8th season)
- Captains: Victor Reuther; Walter Vanderbush
- Home stadium: Fisher Field

1931 Middle Three Conference football standings
	Conf.					Overall
Team	W		L		T	W		L		T
Lafayette $	2	–	0	–	0	7	–	2	–	0
Rutgers	1	–	1	–	0	4	–	3	–	1
Lehigh	0	–	2	–	0	3	–	7	–	0
$ – Conference champion

The 1931 Lafayette Leopards football team was an American football team that represented Lafayette College in the Middle Three Conference during the 1931 college football season. In its eighth season under head coach Herb McCracken, the team compiled a 7–2 record. Victor Reuther and Walter Vanderbush were the team captains.

== Schedule ==
Date	Opponent	Site	Result	Source
September 26	Baltimore*	Fisher Field; Easton, PA	W 51–0	
October 3	Muhlenberg*	Fisher Field; Easton, PA	W 26–0	
October 10	at Colgate*	Whitnall Field; Hamilton, NY	L 0–16	
October 17	St. John's (MD)*	Fisher Field; Easton, PA	W 22–0	
October 24	Washington & Jefferson*	Fisher Field; Easton, PA	W 21–0	
October 31	at Penn*	Franklin Field; Philadelphia, PA	L 0–3	
November 7	Rutgers	Fisher Field; Easton, PA	W 22–0	
November 14	Penn State*	Fisher Field; Easton, PA	W 33–0	
November 21	at Lehigh	Taylor Stadium; Bethlethem, PA (rivalry)	W 13–7	
*Non-conference game
