= 1931 Maine Black Bears football team =

American college football season

1931 Maine Black Bears football

MIAA champion
- Conference: New England Conference, Maine Intercollegiate Athletic Association
- Record: 4–3 (1–2 New England, 3–0 MIAA)
- Head coach: Fred Brice (11th season)
- Home stadium: Alumni Field

1931 New England Conference football standings
	Conf.					Overall
Team	W		L		T	W		L		T
New Hampshire +	2	–	0	–	0	7	–	2	–	0
Rhode Island State +	2	–	0	–	0	4	–	4	–	0
Maine	1	–	2	–	0	4	–	3	–	0
Connecticut	0	–	3	–	0	2	–	3	–	3
+ – Conference co-champions

The 1931 Maine Black Bears football team was an American football team that represented the University of Maine as a member of the New England Conference and Maine Intercollegiate Athletic Association during the 1931 college football season. In its 11th season under head coach Fred Brice, the team compiled a 4–3 record (1–2 against New England and 3–0 against MIAA conference opponents). The team played its home games at Alumni Field in Orono, Maine. James Sims was the team captain.

== Schedule ==
Date	Opponent	Site	Result	Attendance	Source
September 26	Rhode Island State	Alumni Field; Orono, ME	L 7–8		
October 3	at Yale*	Yale Bowl; New Haven, CT	L 0–19	25,000	
October 10	at Connecticut	Gardner Dow Athletic Fields; Storrs, CT	W 8–0		
October 17	New Hampshire	Alumni Field; Orono, ME (rivalry)	L 7–12		
October 24	at Bates	Garcelon Field; Lewiston, ME	W 9–6		
October 31	at Colby	Seaverns Field; Waterville, ME	W 19–7		
November 7	Bowdoin	Alumni Field; Orono, ME	W 20–0		
*Non-conference game
