= 1931 New Hampshire Wildcats football team =

American college football season

1931 New Hampshire Wildcats football
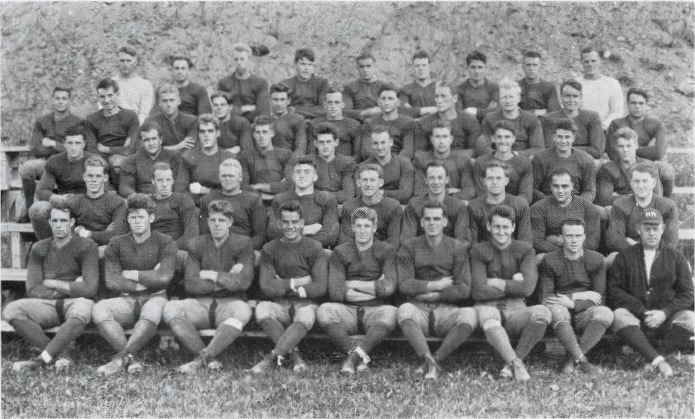
- Conference: New England Conference
- Record: 7–2 (2–0 New England)
- Head coach: Butch Cowell (16th season)
- Captain: Richard Eustis
- Home stadium: Memorial Field

1931 New England Conference football standings
	Conf.					Overall
Team	W		L		T	W		L		T
New Hampshire +	2	–	0	–	0	7	–	2	–	0
Rhode Island State +	2	–	0	–	0	4	–	4	–	0
Maine	1	–	2	–	0	4	–	3	–	0
Connecticut	0	–	3	–	0	2	–	3	–	3
+ – Conference co-champions

The 1931 New Hampshire Wildcats football team was an American football team that represented the University of New Hampshire as a member of the New England Conference during the 1931 college football season. In its 16th season under head coach William "Butch" Cowell, (Note: This was Cowell's 17th year and 16th season as head coach, as the school did not field a team in 1918 due to World War I.) the team compiled a 7–2 record, (Note: New Hampshire's varsity record in 1931 was 7–2. College Football Data Warehouse also lists a tied game, against Saint Anselm; however, contemporary news reports are clear that it was New Hampshire's freshman team that played Saint Anselm.) and outscored their opponents, 171–84. The team played its home games in Durham, New Hampshire, at Memorial Field. (Note: Memorial Field remains in use by the New Hampshire women's field hockey team.)

== Schedule ==
Date	Opponent	Site	Result	Attendance	Source
September 26	Lowell Textile* (Note: Lowell Textile is now University of Massachusetts Lowell.)	Memorial Field; Durham, NH	W 12–6		
October 3	Boston University*	Memorial Field; Durham, NH	W 6–0		
October 10	at Harvard*	Harvard Stadium; Boston, MA	L 0–39	20,000	
October 17	at Maine	Alumni Field; Orono, ME (rivalry)	W 13–7		
October 24	at Vermont*	Centennial Field; Burlington, VT	W 43–0		
October 31	Tufts*^{†}	Memorial Field; Durham, NH	W 9–0	5,000	
November 7	at Connecticut	Gardner Dow Field; Storrs, CT	W 49–0		
November 14	Springfield*	Memorial Field; Durham, NH	W 26–13		
November 21	at Brown*	Brown Stadium; Providence, RI	L 13–19		
*Non-conference game; ^{†}Homecoming; Source:

The 1931 game remains the last time that the Brown and New Hampshire football programs have met.

New Hampshire captain Richard Eustis was inducted to the university's athletic hall of fame in 1983. Eustis, who died in 1969 at the age of 62, served as athletic director at nearby Exeter High School, where the school named its football field after him in 1970.
