= John McEwan =

American football player and coach (1893–1970)

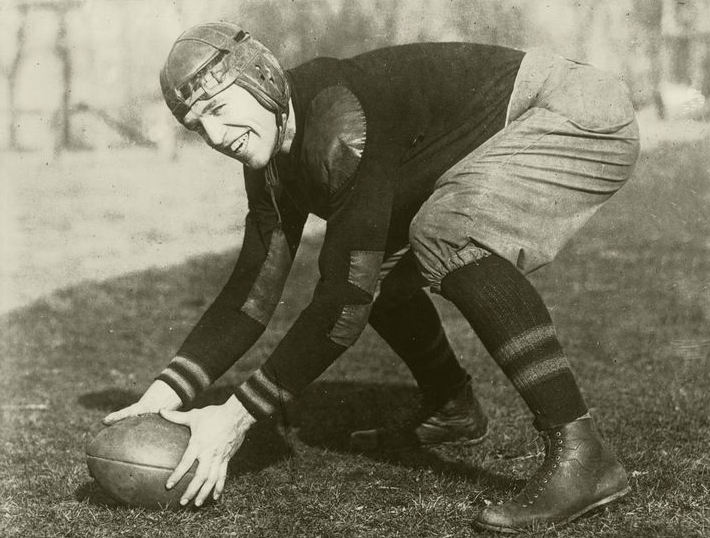

Biographical details
- Born: February 18, 1893; Alexandria, Minnesota, U.S.
- Died: August 9, 1970 (aged 77); New York, New York, U.S.

Playing career
- 1913–1916: Army
- Position: Center

Coaching career (HC unless noted)
- 1919–1922: Army (assistant)
- 1923–1925: Army
- 1926–1929: Oregon
- 1930–1932: Holy Cross
- 1933–1934: Brooklyn Dodgers

Head coaching record
- Overall: 59–23–6 (college); 9–11–1 (NFL)

Accomplishments and honors

Championships
- 1 PCC (1929)

Awards
- Consensus All-American (1914); Second-team All-American (1916); Third-team All-American (1915)
- College Football Hall of Fame; Inducted in 1962 (profile)

John James "Cap" McEwan (February 18, 1893 – August 9, 1970) was an American football player and coach. He played and coached at the United States Military Academy and was the head coach at the University of Oregon and College of the Holy Cross after his military career ended. He then spent two seasons in the professional ranks, coaching the Brooklyn Dodgers of the National Football League from 1933 to 1934.

== Early life ==
McEwan played from 1913 to 1916 as a center at the United States Military Academy, where he was a three-time All-American and captain of the 1916 Army Cadets football team. After graduating, McEwan served with the 3rd Infantry Division. He was president of the General Courts Martial and at Fort Sam Houston. In 1917, he married Letty Peterson. They had two children, John Jr. and Janet.

== Coaching career ==
In 1919, McEwan returned to West Point as the head line coach. In December 1922, head coach Charles Dudley Daly resigned and was succeeded by McEwan. In his three seasons as head coach, McEwan led Army to an 18–5–3 record. Following the 1925 season, McEwan accepted the head coaching position at Oregon and resigned from the Army.

From 1926 to 1929 he was the head football coach at Oregon. His record there stands at 20–13–2, with his 1928 team completing a 9–2 campaign. McEwan announced his resignation as head football coach on November 22, 1929. He later back tracked and on December 19, announced that his "plans for the ensuing year are to continue by duties at the University of Oregon". However, following reports that McEwan had provided Army with film of the Stanford–Oregon game, the University of Oregon student executive council voted to ask for McEwan's resignation, a move which was supported by university president, Dr. Arnold Bennett Hall.

In 1930, McEwan became head coach at Holy Cross. In 1932, he was suspended by the school following an in-game dispute with athletic trainer Bart F. Sullivan. McEwan accused Sullivan of insubordination for not substituting an injured player, while Sullivan claimed that the player was healthy and because the team had used all of its time outs, substituting a non-injured player would have resulted in a costly penalty. McEwan filed a lawsuit to overturn his suspension, but withdrew it and resigned after reaching a settlement with the university on January 21, 1933.

Later that year, he was hired to coach the Brooklyn Dodgers of the National Football League by the team's new owners, Red Cagle and Shipwreck Kelly. McEwan compiled a 9–11–1 record over two seasons.

== Later life ==
Following a financially unsuccessful 1934 season, Dodgers owner Dan Topping released McEwan and a number of the team's high-profile players. McEwan was unable to secure another coaching position and became an investigator for the Works Progress Administration. In 1942, he returned to active military duty and was assigned to the office of the Chief of Engineers. Receiving the rank of Lieutenant colonel, McEwan served as the labor relations officer for the North Atlantic Division of the United States Army Corps of Engineers. From 1947 to 1963, he was the chief of labor relations for the New York City Transit Authority.

McEwan died on August 9, 1970, at the Veteran's Hospital in Manhattan.

== Head coaching record ==
=== College ===
Year	Team	Overall	Conference	Standing	Bowl/playoffs
Army Cadets (Independent) (1923–1925)
1923	Army	6–2–1			
1924	Army	5–1–2			
1925	Army	7–2			
Army:		18–5–3			
Oregon Webfoots (Pacific Coast Conference) (1926–1929)
1926	Oregon	2–4–1	1–4	7th	
1927	Oregon	2–4–1	0–4–1	8th	
1928	Oregon	9–2	4–2	4th	
1929	Oregon	7–3	4–1	T–1st	
Oregon:		20–13–2	9–11–1		
Holy Cross Crusaders (Independent) (1930–1932)
1930	Holy Cross	8–2			
1931	Holy Cross	7–2–1			
1932	Holy Cross	6–1 (Note: McEwan was suspended after the first seven games of the 1932 season. Art Corcoran was appointed interim head coach for the final three games. Holy Cross finished the year with an overall record of 6–2–2.)			
Holy Cross:		21–5–1			
Total:		59–23–6			
National championship Conference title Conference division title or championship game berth

=== NFL ===
Team	Year	Regular season					Postseason			
Team	Year	Won	Lost	Ties	Win %	Finish	Won	Lost	Win %	Result
BKN	1933	5	4	1	.550	2nd in East	–	–	–	–
BKN	1934	4	7	0	.364	3rd in East	–	–	–	–
		9	11	1	.452		–	–	–	–
