= 1931 Harvard Crimson football team =

American college football season

1931 Harvard Crimson football
- Conference: Independent
- Record: 7–1
- Head coach: Eddie Casey (1st season)
- Captain: Barry Wood
- Home stadium: Harvard Stadium

1931 Eastern college football independents records
| | Conf. | | | Overall |
| Team | W | L | T | W | | L | | T |
|---|---|---|---|---|---|---|---|---|
| Bucknell | | – | | 6 | – | 0 | – | 3 |
| Colgate | | – | | 8 | – | 1 | – | 0 |
| No. 9 Pittsburgh | | – | | 8 | – | 1 | – | 0 |
| Cornell | | – | | 7 | – | 1 | – | 0 |
| Drexel | | – | | 7 | – | 1 | – | 0 |
| No. 7 Harvard | | – | | 7 | – | 1 | – | 0 |
| Temple | | – | | 8 | – | 1 | – | 1 |
| Columbia | | – | | 7 | – | 1 | – | 1 |
| Massachusetts State | | – | | 7 | – | 1 | – | 1 |
| Syracuse | | – | | 7 | – | 1 | – | 1 |
| Fordham | | – | | 6 | – | 1 | – | 2 |
| No. 8 Yale | | – | | 5 | – | 1 | – | 2 |
| Army | | – | | 8 | – | 2 | – | 1 |
| Franklin & Marshall | | – | | 6 | – | 2 | – | 0 |
| Manhattan | | – | | 4 | – | 2 | – | 1 |
| Brown | | – | | 7 | – | 3 | – | 0 |
| Providence | | – | | 7 | – | 3 | – | 0 |
| Penn | | – | | 6 | – | 3 | – | 0 |
| NYU | | – | | 6 | – | 3 | – | 1 |
| Boston College | | – | | 6 | – | 4 | – | 0 |
| Washington & Jefferson | | – | | 6 | – | 4 | – | 0 |
| Tufts | | – | | 3 | – | 2 | – | 2 |
| Villanova | | – | | 4 | – | 3 | – | 2 |
| La Salle | | – | | 4 | – | 4 | – | 0 |
| Duquesne | | – | | 3 | – | 5 | – | 3 |
| Carnegie Tech | | – | | 3 | – | 5 | – | 1 |
| St. John's | | – | | 3 | – | 5 | – | 1 |
| CCNY | | – | | 2 | – | 5 | – | 1 |
| Boston University | | – | | 2 | – | 7 | – | 0 |
| Penn State | | – | | 2 | – | 8 | – | 0 |
| Princeton | | – | | 1 | – | 7 | – | 0 |
| Vermont | | – | | 1 | – | 8 | – | 0 |
Rankings from Dickinson System

The 1931 Harvard Crimson football team represented Harvard University as an independent team during the 1931 college football season. In its first season under head coach Eddie Casey, Harvard compiled a 7–1 record and outscored opponents by a total of 149 to 29. Barry Wood was the team captain. The team played its home games at Harvard Stadium in Boston.

== Schedule ==
| Date | Opponent | Site | Result | Attendance | Source |
|---|---|---|---|---|---|
| October 3 | Bates | Harvard Stadium; Boston, MA | W 28–0 | | |
| October 10 | New Hampshire | Harvard Stadium; Boston, MA | W 35–0 | 20,000 | |
| October 17 | at Army | Michie Stadium; West Point, NY | W 14–13 | | |
| October 24 | Texas | Harvard Stadium; Boston, MA | W 35–7 | | |
| October 31 | Virginia | Harvard Stadium; Boston, MA | W 19–0 | | |
| November 7 | Dartmouth | Harvard Stadium; Boston, MA (rivalry) | W 7–6 | 57,000 | |
| November 14 | Holy Cross | Harvard Stadium; Boston, MA | W 7–0 | | |
| November 21 | Yale | Harvard Stadium; Boston, MA (rivalry) | L 0–3 | 58,000 | |
