= Bart Sullivan =

American track and field coach (1879–1968)

Biographical details
- Born: February 12, 1879; Boston, Massachusetts, U.S.
- Died: February 12, 1968 (aged 88); Worcester, Massachusetts, U.S.

Coaching career (HC unless noted)

Football
- 1918: Holy Cross

Track
- 1911–1912: Boston College
- 1912–1964: Holy Cross

Head coaching record
- Overall: 2–0 (football)

Bartholomew Francis Sullivan (February 12, 1879 – February 24, 1968) was an American track and field coach and runner. He served as the head track coach at The College of the Holy Cross in Worcester, Massachusetts, from 1912 to 1964.

== Running career ==
Sullivan was born on February 12, 1879, in Boston. He finished third in the 1899 Boston Marathon and seventh in the following year's race. In 1901, Sullivan won the New England Amateur Athletic Union's half mile championship.

== Coaching ==
In 1911 and 1912, Sullivan coached the track and field teams at Boston College and Boston College High School. In 1912, he moved to Holy Cross, where he served as head track coach and trainer of the Holy Cross Crusaders football team. Sullivan developed a number of track champions, including Joe Tierney, Leo Larrivee, and Walter Mulvihill. He was also the school's head football coach for one season in 1918, compiling a record of 2–0. In 1932, head football coach John McEwan attempted to fire Sullivan for insubordination after Sullivan did not substitute an injured player. Sullivan claimed that the player was healthy and because the team had used all of its time outs, substituting a non-injured player would have resulted in a costly penalty. The school sided with Sullivan and suspended McEwan. McEwan eventually resigned after reaching a settlement with the university on January 21, 1933. In 1963, Sullivan, at the age of 81, led Holy Cross to the New England intercollegiate indoor championships. He retired the following year and was replaced by Tom Duffy, head coach at Rindge Technical School, a former Holy Cross runner under Sullivan, and the trainer of John Thomas.

== Death ==
Sullivan died on February 24, 1968, at a nursing home in Worcester, Massachusetts. He was predeceased by his wife, the former Ella Keohane, who died in 1958.

== Head coaching record ==
=== Football ===
Year	Team	Overall	Conference	Standing	Bowl/playoffs
Holy Cross (Independent) (1918)
1918	Holy Cross	2–0			
Holy Cross:		2–0			
Total:		2–0			
