= 1931 Brown Bears football team =

American college football season

1931 Brown Bears football
- Conference: Independent
- Record: 7–3
- Head coach: Tuss McLaughry (6th season)
- Captain: P. F. Mackesey
- Home stadium: Brown Stadium

1931 Eastern college football independents records
	Conf.			Overall
Team	W	L	T	W		L		T
Bucknell		–		6	–	0	–	3
Colgate		–		8	–	1	–	0
No. 9 Pittsburgh		–		8	–	1	–	0
Cornell		–		7	–	1	–	0
Drexel		–		7	–	1	–	0
No. 7 Harvard		–		7	–	1	–	0
Temple		–		8	–	1	–	1
Columbia		–		7	–	1	–	1
Massachusetts State		–		7	–	1	–	1
Syracuse		–		7	–	1	–	1
Fordham		–		6	–	1	–	2
No. 8 Yale		–		5	–	1	–	2
Army		–		8	–	2	–	1
Franklin & Marshall		–		6	–	2	–	0
Manhattan		–		4	–	2	–	1
Brown		–		7	–	3	–	0
Providence		–		7	–	3	–	0
Penn		–		6	–	3	–	0
NYU		–		6	–	3	–	1
Boston College		–		6	–	4	–	0
Washington & Jefferson		–		6	–	4	–	0
Tufts		–		3	–	2	–	2
Villanova		–		4	–	3	–	2
La Salle		–		4	–	4	–	0
Duquesne		–		3	–	5	–	3
Carnegie Tech		–		3	–	5	–	1
St. John's		–		3	–	5	–	1
CCNY		–		2	–	5	–	1
Boston University		–		2	–	7	–	0
Penn State		–		2	–	8	–	0
Princeton		–		1	–	7	–	0
Vermont		–		1	–	8	–	0
Rankings from Dickinson System

The 1931 Brown Bears football team represented Brown University as an independent during the 1931 college football season. Led by sixth-year head coach Tuss McLaughry, the Bears compiled a record of 7–3.

== Schedule ==
Date	Opponent	Site	Result	Attendance	Source
September 27	Colby	Brown Stadium; Providence, RI	W 22–0		
October 3	Rhode Island State	Brown Stadium; Providence, RI (rivalry)	W 18–0		
October 10	at Princeton	Palmer Stadium; Princeton, NJ	W 19–7		
October 17	Tufts	Brown Stadium; Providence, RI	W 33–12		
October 24	Lehigh	Brown Stadium; Providence, RI	W 33–0		
October 31	at Holy Cross	Fitton Field; Worcester, MA	L 0–33		
November 7	Ohio Wesleyan	Brown Stadium; Providence, RI	W 26–13		
November 14	Columbia	Brown Stadium; Providence, RI	L 7–9	10,000	
November 21	New Hampshire	Brown Stadium; Providence, RI	W 19–13		
November 28	Colgate	Brown Stadium; Providence, RI	L 7–13	15,000	
