= 1931 Cornell Big Red football team =

American college football season

1931 Cornell Big Red football
- Conference: Independent
- Record: 7–1
- Head coach: Gil Dobie (12th season)
- Offensive scheme: Single-wing
- Base defense: 6–3–2
- Captain: Cristobal Martinez-Zorrilla
- Home stadium: Schoellkopf Field

1931 Eastern college football independents records
	Conf.			Overall
Team	W	L	T	W		L		T
Bucknell		–		6	–	0	–	3
Colgate		–		8	–	1	–	0
No. 9 Pittsburgh		–		8	–	1	–	0
Cornell		–		7	–	1	–	0
Drexel		–		7	–	1	–	0
No. 7 Harvard		–		7	–	1	–	0
Temple		–		8	–	1	–	1
Columbia		–		7	–	1	–	1
Massachusetts State		–		7	–	1	–	1
Syracuse		–		7	–	1	–	1
Fordham		–		6	–	1	–	2
No. 8 Yale		–		5	–	1	–	2
Army		–		8	–	2	–	1
Franklin & Marshall		–		6	–	2	–	0
Manhattan		–		4	–	2	–	1
Brown		–		7	–	3	–	0
Providence		–		7	–	3	–	0
Penn		–		6	–	3	–	0
NYU		–		6	–	3	–	1
Boston College		–		6	–	4	–	0
Washington & Jefferson		–		6	–	4	–	0
Tufts		–		3	–	2	–	2
Villanova		–		4	–	3	–	2
La Salle		–		4	–	4	–	0
Duquesne		–		3	–	5	–	3
Carnegie Tech		–		3	–	5	–	1
St. John's		–		3	–	5	–	1
CCNY		–		2	–	5	–	1
Boston University		–		2	–	7	–	0
Penn State		–		2	–	8	–	0
Princeton		–		1	–	7	–	0
Vermont		–		1	–	8	–	0
Rankings from Dickinson System

The 1931 Cornell Big Red football team was an American football team that represented Cornell University during the 1931 college football season. In their 12th season under head coach Gil Dobie, the Big Red compiled a 7–1 record and outscored their opponents by a combined total of 239 to 20.

The traditional Thanksgiving game against Penn attracted a reported crowd of 70,000 to Franklin Field. Cornell's 7-0 win earned a story on the front page of The Philadelphia Inquirer along with a detailed quarter-by-quarter description of the game in the newspaper.

== Schedule ==
Date	Opponent	Site	Result	Source
September 26	Clarkson	Schoellkopf Field; Ithaca, NY	W 68–0	
October 3	Niagara	Schoellkopf Field; Ithaca, NY	W 37–6	
October 10	Richmond	Schoellkopf Field; Ithaca, NY	W 27–0	
October 17	Princeton	Schoellkopf Field; Ithaca, NY	W 33–0	
October 31	Columbia	Schoellkopf Field; Ithaca, NY (rivalry)	W 13–0	
November 7	Alfred	Schoellkopf Field; Ithaca, NY	W 54–0	
November 14	at Dartmouth	Memorial Field; Hanover, NH (rivalry)	L 0–14	
November 26	at Penn	Franklin Field; Philadelphia, PA (rivalry)	W 7–0	
