= 1931 Yale Bulldogs football team =

American college football season

1931 Yale Bulldogs football
- Conference: Independent
- Record: 5–1–2
- Head coach: Mal Stevens (4th season)
- Offensive scheme: Single-wing
- Captain: Albie Booth
- Home stadium: Yale Bowl

1931 Eastern college football independents records
	Conf.			Overall
Team	W	L	T	W		L		T
Bucknell		–		6	–	0	–	3
Colgate		–		8	–	1	–	0
No. 9 Pittsburgh		–		8	–	1	–	0
Cornell		–		7	–	1	–	0
Drexel		–		7	–	1	–	0
No. 7 Harvard		–		7	–	1	–	0
Temple		–		8	–	1	–	1
Columbia		–		7	–	1	–	1
Massachusetts State		–		7	–	1	–	1
Syracuse		–		7	–	1	–	1
Fordham		–		6	–	1	–	2
No. 8 Yale		–		5	–	1	–	2
Army		–		8	–	2	–	1
Franklin & Marshall		–		6	–	2	–	0
Manhattan		–		4	–	2	–	1
Brown		–		7	–	3	–	0
Providence		–		7	–	3	–	0
Penn		–		6	–	3	–	0
NYU		–		6	–	3	–	1
Boston College		–		6	–	4	–	0
Washington & Jefferson		–		6	–	4	–	0
Tufts		–		3	–	2	–	2
Villanova		–		4	–	3	–	2
La Salle		–		4	–	4	–	0
Duquesne		–		3	–	5	–	3
Carnegie Tech		–		3	–	5	–	1
St. John's		–		3	–	5	–	1
CCNY		–		2	–	5	–	1
Boston University		–		2	–	7	–	0
Penn State		–		2	–	8	–	0
Princeton		–		1	–	7	–	0
Vermont		–		1	–	8	–	0
Rankings from Dickinson System

The 1931 Yale Bulldogs football team represented Yale University in the 1931 college football season. In their fourth year under head coach Mal Stevens, Yale compiled a 5–1–2 record, shut out four opponents, and outscored all opponents, 198 to 79. In the annual rivalry game, Yale defeated Princeton by a 51–14 score, the worst defeat in Princeton history.

Two Yale players received All-America recognition. Halfback and team captain Albie Booth was selected on the second team by the International News Service (INS) and on the third team by the Associated Press. End Herster Barnes was selected on the third team by the INS.

Joe Crowley set a Yale Bowl record by scoring five touchdowns in a single game on November 7, 1931.

== Schedule ==
Date	Opponent	Site	Result	Attendance	Source
October 3	Maine	Yale Bowl; New Haven, CT	W 19–0	25,000	
October 10	Georgia	Yale Bowl; New Haven, CT	L 7–26	70,000	
October 17	at Chicago	Stagg Field; Chicago, IL	W 27–0	35,000	
October 24	Army	Yale Bowl; New Haven, CT	T 6–6	70,000	
October 31	Dartmouth	Yale Bowl; New Haven, CT	T 33–33	40,000	
November 7	St. John's (MD)	Yale Bowl; New Haven, CT	W 52–0	5,000	
November 21	at Harvard	Harvard Stadium; Boston, MA (rivalry)	W 3–0	58,000	
November 28	Princeton	Yale Bowl; New Haven, CT (rivalry)	W 51–14	40,000	
