= 1931 Fordham Rams football team =

American college football season

1931 Fordham Rams football
- Conference: Independent
- Record: 6–1–2
- Head coach: Frank Cavanaugh (5th season)
- Captain: James Murphy
- Home stadium: Fordham Field, Polo Grounds, Yankee Stadium

1931 Eastern college football independents records
	Conf.			Overall
Team	W	L	T	W		L		T
Bucknell		–		6	–	0	–	3
Colgate		–		8	–	1	–	0
No. 9 Pittsburgh		–		8	–	1	–	0
Cornell		–		7	–	1	–	0
Drexel		–		7	–	1	–	0
No. 7 Harvard		–		7	–	1	–	0
Temple		–		8	–	1	–	1
Columbia		–		7	–	1	–	1
Massachusetts State		–		7	–	1	–	1
Syracuse		–		7	–	1	–	1
Fordham		–		6	–	1	–	2
No. 8 Yale		–		5	–	1	–	2
Army		–		8	–	2	–	1
Franklin & Marshall		–		6	–	2	–	0
Manhattan		–		4	–	2	–	1
Brown		–		7	–	3	–	0
Providence		–		7	–	3	–	0
Penn		–		6	–	3	–	0
NYU		–		6	–	3	–	1
Boston College		–		6	–	4	–	0
Washington & Jefferson		–		6	–	4	–	0
Tufts		–		3	–	2	–	2
Villanova		–		4	–	3	–	2
La Salle		–		4	–	4	–	0
Duquesne		–		3	–	5	–	3
Carnegie Tech		–		3	–	5	–	1
St. John's		–		3	–	5	–	1
CCNY		–		2	–	5	–	1
Boston University		–		2	–	7	–	0
Penn State		–		2	–	8	–	0
Princeton		–		1	–	7	–	0
Vermont		–		1	–	8	–	0
Rankings from Dickinson System

The 1931 Fordham Rams football team was an American football team that represented Fordham University as an independent during the 1931 college football season. In its fifth year under head coach Frank Cavanaugh, Fordham compiled a 6–1–2 record, shut out five of nine opponents, and outscored all opponents by a total of 205 to 36.

== Schedule ==
Date	Time	Opponent	Site	Result	Attendance	Source
September 26		Thiel	Fordham Field; Bronx, NY	W 28–0	9,000	
October 3		West Virginia	Polo Grounds; New York, NY	W 20–7	18,000	
October 12	2:00 p.m.	at Boston College	Fenway Park; Boston, MA	W 20–0	25,000	
October 17		Holy Cross	Polo Grounds; New York, NY	T 6–6	20,000	
October 24		Drake	Polo Grounds; New York, NY	W 46–0	10,000	
October 31		West Liberty^{†}	Fordham Field; Bronx, NY	W 33–0		
November 7		Detroit	Polo Grounds; New York, NY	W 39–9		
November 14		NYU	Yankee Stadium; Bronx, NY	T 0–0	80,000	
November 21		Bucknell	Polo Grounds; New York, NY	L 13–14	25,000	
^{†}Homecoming
