= 1931 Columbia Lions football team =

American college football season

1931 Columbia Lions football
- Conference: Independent
- Record: 7–1–1
- Head coach: Lou Little (2nd season)
- Home stadium: Baker Field

1931 Eastern college football independents records
	Conf.			Overall
Team	W	L	T	W		L		T
Bucknell		–		6	–	0	–	3
Colgate		–		8	–	1	–	0
No. 9 Pittsburgh		–		8	–	1	–	0
Cornell		–		7	–	1	–	0
Drexel		–		7	–	1	–	0
No. 7 Harvard		–		7	–	1	–	0
Temple		–		8	–	1	–	1
Columbia		–		7	–	1	–	1
Massachusetts State		–		7	–	1	–	1
Syracuse		–		7	–	1	–	1
Fordham		–		6	–	1	–	2
No. 8 Yale		–		5	–	1	–	2
Army		–		8	–	2	–	1
Franklin & Marshall		–		6	–	2	–	0
Manhattan		–		4	–	2	–	1
Brown		–		7	–	3	–	0
Providence		–		7	–	3	–	0
Penn		–		6	–	3	–	0
NYU		–		6	–	3	–	1
Boston College		–		6	–	4	–	0
Washington & Jefferson		–		6	–	4	–	0
Tufts		–		3	–	2	–	2
Villanova		–		4	–	3	–	2
La Salle		–		4	–	4	–	0
Duquesne		–		3	–	5	–	3
Carnegie Tech		–		3	–	5	–	1
St. John's		–		3	–	5	–	1
CCNY		–		2	–	5	–	1
Boston University		–		2	–	7	–	0
Penn State		–		2	–	8	–	0
Princeton		–		1	–	7	–	0
Vermont		–		1	–	8	–	0
Rankings from Dickinson System

The 1931 Columbia Lions football team was an American football team that represented Columbia University as an independent during the 1931 college football season. In its second season under head coach Lou Little, the team compiled a 7–1–1 record and outscored opponents 223 to 26, with six shutouts. The team played its home games at Baker Field in Upper Manhattan.

== Schedule ==
Date	Opponent	Site	Result	Attendance	Source
September 26	Middlebury	Baker Field; New York, NY	W 61–0		
October 3	Union (NY)	Baker Field; New York, NY	W 51–0		
October 10	at Wesleyan	Middletown, CT	W 37–0		
October 17	Dartmouth	Baker Field; New York, NY	W 19–6		
October 24	Williams	Baker Field; New York, NY	W 19–0		
October 31	at Cornell	Schoellkopf Field; Ithaca, NY (rivalry)	L 0–13		
November 7	Virginia	Baker Field; New York, NY	W 27–0		
November 14	at Brown	Brown Stadium; Providence, RI	W 9–7	10,000	
November 21	Syracuse	Baker Field; New York, NY	T 0–0		
