= 1931 Duquesne Dukes football team =

American college football season

1931 Duquesne Dukes football
- Conference: Independent
- Record: 3–5–3
- Head coach: Elmer Layden (5th season)
- Home stadium: Forbes Field

1931 Eastern college football independents records
	Conf.			Overall
Team	W	L	T	W		L		T
Bucknell		–		6	–	0	–	3
Colgate		–		8	–	1	–	0
No. 9 Pittsburgh		–		8	–	1	–	0
Cornell		–		7	–	1	–	0
Drexel		–		7	–	1	–	0
No. 7 Harvard		–		7	–	1	–	0
Temple		–		8	–	1	–	1
Columbia		–		7	–	1	–	1
Massachusetts State		–		7	–	1	–	1
Syracuse		–		7	–	1	–	1
Fordham		–		6	–	1	–	2
No. 8 Yale		–		5	–	1	–	2
Army		–		8	–	2	–	1
Franklin & Marshall		–		6	–	2	–	0
Manhattan		–		4	–	2	–	1
Brown		–		7	–	3	–	0
Providence		–		7	–	3	–	0
Penn		–		6	–	3	–	0
NYU		–		6	–	3	–	1
Boston College		–		6	–	4	–	0
Washington & Jefferson		–		6	–	4	–	0
Tufts		–		3	–	2	–	2
Villanova		–		4	–	3	–	2
La Salle		–		4	–	4	–	0
Duquesne		–		3	–	5	–	3
Carnegie Tech		–		3	–	5	–	1
St. John's		–		3	–	5	–	1
CCNY		–		2	–	5	–	1
Boston University		–		2	–	7	–	0
Penn State		–		2	–	8	–	0
Princeton		–		1	–	7	–	0
Vermont		–		1	–	8	–	0
Rankings from Dickinson System

The 1931 Duquesne Dukes football team was an American football team that represented Duquesne University as an independent during the 1931 college football season. In its fifth season under head coach Elmer Layden, Duquesne compiled a 3–5–3 record and was outscored by a total of 85 to 56. The team played its home games at Forbes Field in Pittsburgh.

== Schedule ==
Date	Opponent	Site	Result	Attendance	Source
September 18	Geneva	Forbes Field; Pittsburgh, PA	W 13–7		
September 26	at West Virginia	Mountaineer Field; Morgantown, WV	L 6–14		
October 2	Oglethorpe	Forbes Field; Pittsburgh, PA	W 6–0	6,000	
October 9	West Virginia Wesleyan	Forbes Field; Pittsburgh, PA	L 0–12		
October 16	Georgetown	Forbes Field; Pittsburgh, PA	T 0–0	5,000	
October 23	Western Maryland	Forbes Field; Pittsburgh, PA	T 0–0	10,000	
October 30	Catholic University	Forbes Field; Pittsburgh, PA	L 12–20		
November 7	at Holy Cross	Fitton Field; Worcester, MA	L 0–12		
November 20	North Dakota	Forbes Field; Pittsburgh, PA	W 13–7		
November 26	at Howard (AL)	Legion Field; Birmingham, AL	L 6–13	5,000	
December 5	at Carnegie Tech	Pitt Stadium; Pittsburgh, PA	T 0–0	50,000	
