= 1931 Boston College Eagles football team =

American college football season

1931 Boston College Eagles football
- Conference: Independent
- Record: 6–4
- Head coach: Joe McKenney (4th season)
- Captain: Joe Kelley
- Home stadium: Fenway Park

1931 Eastern college football independents records
	Conf.			Overall
Team	W	L	T	W		L		T
Bucknell		–		6	–	0	–	3
Colgate		–		8	–	1	–	0
No. 9 Pittsburgh		–		8	–	1	–	0
Cornell		–		7	–	1	–	0
Drexel		–		7	–	1	–	0
No. 7 Harvard		–		7	–	1	–	0
Temple		–		8	–	1	–	1
Columbia		–		7	–	1	–	1
Massachusetts State		–		7	–	1	–	1
Syracuse		–		7	–	1	–	1
Fordham		–		6	–	1	–	2
No. 8 Yale		–		5	–	1	–	2
Army		–		8	–	2	–	1
Franklin & Marshall		–		6	–	2	–	0
Manhattan		–		4	–	2	–	1
Brown		–		7	–	3	–	0
Providence		–		7	–	3	–	0
Penn		–		6	–	3	–	0
NYU		–		6	–	3	–	1
Boston College		–		6	–	4	–	0
Washington & Jefferson		–		6	–	4	–	0
Tufts		–		3	–	2	–	2
Villanova		–		4	–	3	–	2
La Salle		–		4	–	4	–	0
Duquesne		–		3	–	5	–	3
Carnegie Tech		–		3	–	5	–	1
St. John's		–		3	–	5	–	1
CCNY		–		2	–	5	–	1
Boston University		–		2	–	7	–	0
Penn State		–		2	–	8	–	0
Princeton		–		1	–	7	–	0
Vermont		–		1	–	8	–	0
Rankings from Dickinson System

The 1931 Boston College Eagles football team represented Boston College as an independent during the 1931 college football season. The Eagles were led by fourth-year head coach Joe McKenney and played their home games at Fenway Park in Boston. The team finished with a record of 6–4.

== Schedule ==
Date	Time	Opponent	Site	Result	Attendance	Source
September 26	2:30 p.m.	Catholic University	Fenway Park; Boston, MA	W 26–7		
October 3	2:30 p.m.	Dayton	Fenway Park; Boston, MA	W 13–0		
October 12	2:00 p.m.	Fordham	Fenway Park; Boston, MA	L 0–20	25,000	
October 17		Villanova	Fenway Park; Boston, MA	L 6–12		
October 24	2:00 p.m.	Marquette	Fenway Park; Boston, MA	L 0–7	5,000	
October 31		Georgetown	Fenway Park; Boston, MA	W 20–2		
November 7	2:30 p.m.	vs. Western Maryland	Baltimore Stadium; Baltimore, MD	W 19–13	5,000	
November 11	2:00 p.m.	Centre	Fenway Park; Boston, MA	W 7–0	12,000	
November 21	2:00 p.m.	Boston University	Fenway Park; Boston, MA (rivalry)	W 18–6		
November 26	1:45 p.m.	vs. Holy Cross	Harvard Stadium; Boston, MA (rivalry)	L 6–7	25,000	
All times are in Eastern time
