= 1931 Carnegie Tech Tartans football team =

American college football season

1931 Carnegie Tech Tartans football
- Conference: Independent
- Record: 3–5–1
- Head coach: Walter Steffen (17th season)
- Home stadium: Pitt Stadium

1931 Eastern college football independents records
	Conf.			Overall
Team	W	L	T	W		L		T
Bucknell		–		6	–	0	–	3
Colgate		–		8	–	1	–	0
No. 9 Pittsburgh		–		8	–	1	–	0
Cornell		–		7	–	1	–	0
Drexel		–		7	–	1	–	0
No. 7 Harvard		–		7	–	1	–	0
Temple		–		8	–	1	–	1
Columbia		–		7	–	1	–	1
Massachusetts State		–		7	–	1	–	1
Syracuse		–		7	–	1	–	1
Fordham		–		6	–	1	–	2
No. 8 Yale		–		5	–	1	–	2
Army		–		8	–	2	–	1
Franklin & Marshall		–		6	–	2	–	0
Manhattan		–		4	–	2	–	1
Brown		–		7	–	3	–	0
Providence		–		7	–	3	–	0
Penn		–		6	–	3	–	0
NYU		–		6	–	3	–	1
Boston College		–		6	–	4	–	0
Washington & Jefferson		–		6	–	4	–	0
Tufts		–		3	–	2	–	2
Villanova		–		4	–	3	–	2
La Salle		–		4	–	4	–	0
Duquesne		–		3	–	5	–	3
Carnegie Tech		–		3	–	5	–	1
St. John's		–		3	–	5	–	1
CCNY		–		2	–	5	–	1
Boston University		–		2	–	7	–	0
Penn State		–		2	–	8	–	0
Princeton		–		1	–	7	–	0
Vermont		–		1	–	8	–	0
Rankings from Dickinson System

The 1931 Carnegie Tech Tartans football team represented the Carnegie Institute of Technology—now known as Carnegie Mellon University—as an independent during the 1931 college football season. Led by 17th-year head coach Walter Steffen, the Tartans compiled a record of 3–5–1.

== Schedule ==
Date	Opponent	Site	Result	Attendance	Source
September 26	at Buffalo	Buffalo, NY	W 25–0		
October 3	at Washington & Jefferson	College Field; Washington, PA	L 7–10		
October 10	at Georgia Tech	Grant Field; Atlanta, GA	W 13–0		
October 24	Purdue	Pitt Stadium; Pittsburgh, PA	L 6–13		
October 31	Notre Dame	Pitt Stadium; Pittsburgh, PA	L 0–19	42,271	
November 7	at Pittsburgh	Pitt Stadium; Pittsburgh, PA	L 6–14	25,000	
November 14	Temple	Temple Stadium; Philadelphia, PA	W 19–13	18,000	
November 26	at NYU	Yankee Stadium; Bronx, NY	L 6–7	25,000	
December 5	Duquesne	Pittsburgh, PA	T 0–0	50,000	
