= 1931 Colgate football team =

American college football season

1931 Colgate football
- Conference: Independent
- Record: 8–1
- Head coach: Andrew Kerr (3rd season)
- Captain: John Orsi
- Home stadium: Whitnall Field

1931 Eastern college football independents records
	Conf.			Overall
Team	W	L	T	W		L		T
Bucknell		–		6	–	0	–	3
Colgate		–		8	–	1	–	0
No. 9 Pittsburgh		–		8	–	1	–	0
Cornell		–		7	–	1	–	0
Drexel		–		7	–	1	–	0
No. 7 Harvard		–		7	–	1	–	0
Temple		–		8	–	1	–	1
Columbia		–		7	–	1	–	1
Massachusetts State		–		7	–	1	–	1
Syracuse		–		7	–	1	–	1
Fordham		–		6	–	1	–	2
No. 8 Yale		–		5	–	1	–	2
Army		–		8	–	2	–	1
Franklin & Marshall		–		6	–	2	–	0
Manhattan		–		4	–	2	–	1
Brown		–		7	–	3	–	0
Providence		–		7	–	3	–	0
Penn		–		6	–	3	–	0
NYU		–		6	–	3	–	1
Boston College		–		6	–	4	–	0
Washington & Jefferson		–		6	–	4	–	0
Tufts		–		3	–	2	–	2
Villanova		–		4	–	3	–	2
La Salle		–		4	–	4	–	0
Duquesne		–		3	–	5	–	3
Carnegie Tech		–		3	–	5	–	1
St. John's		–		3	–	5	–	1
CCNY		–		2	–	5	–	1
Boston University		–		2	–	7	–	0
Penn State		–		2	–	8	–	0
Princeton		–		1	–	7	–	0
Vermont		–		1	–	8	–	0
Rankings from Dickinson System

The 1931 Colgate football team was an American football team that represented Colgate University as an independent during the 1931 college football season. In its third season under head coach Andrew Kerr, the team compiled an 8–1 record, shut out five of nine opponents, and outscored all opponents by a total of 227 to 34.

End John Orsi was selected by the International News Service (INS), All-America Board, and Walter Camp Football Foundation (WCFF) as a first-team player on the 1931 All-America team. He was also selected as a second-team All-American by was the Associated Press (AP) and Newspaper Enterprise Association (NEA). He was selected by the AP and UP as a first-team player on the 1931 All-Eastern football team. He was also selected as the team captain.

The team played its home games on Whitnall Field in Hamilton, New York.

== Schedule ==
Date	Opponent	Site	Result	Attendance	Source
September 26	Niagara	Whitnall Field; Hamilton, NY	W 40–0	3,000	
October 3	St. Lawrence	Whitnall Field; Hamilton, NY	W 45–0	4,000	
October 10	Lafayette	Whitnall Field; Hamilton, NY	W 16–0		
October 17	Manhattan	Whitnall Field; Hamilton, NY	W 33–0	4,000	
October 24	at NYU	Yankee Stadium; Bronx, NY	L 0–13	50,000	
October 31	Mississippi College	Whitnall Field; Hamilton, NY	W 27–0	2,500	
November 7	at Penn State	New Beaver Field; State College, PA	W 32–7	5,000	
November 14	at Syracuse	Archbold Stadium; Syracuse, NY (rivalry)	W 21–7	35,000	
November 28	at Brown	Andrews Field; Providence, RI	W 13–7	15,000	
