= 1931 Princeton Tigers football team =

American college football season

1931 Princeton Tigers football
- Conference: Independent
- Record: 1–7
- Head coach: Albert Wittmer (1st season)
- Captain: William H. Yeckley
- Home stadium: Palmer Stadium

1931 Eastern college football independents records
	Conf.			Overall
Team	W	L	T	W		L		T
Bucknell		–		6	–	0	–	3
Colgate		–		8	–	1	–	0
No. 9 Pittsburgh		–		8	–	1	–	0
Cornell		–		7	–	1	–	0
Drexel		–		7	–	1	–	0
No. 7 Harvard		–		7	–	1	–	0
Temple		–		8	–	1	–	1
Columbia		–		7	–	1	–	1
Massachusetts State		–		7	–	1	–	1
Syracuse		–		7	–	1	–	1
Fordham		–		6	–	1	–	2
No. 8 Yale		–		5	–	1	–	2
Army		–		8	–	2	–	1
Franklin & Marshall		–		6	–	2	–	0
Manhattan		–		4	–	2	–	1
Brown		–		7	–	3	–	0
Providence		–		7	–	3	–	0
Penn		–		6	–	3	–	0
NYU		–		6	–	3	–	1
Boston College		–		6	–	4	–	0
Washington & Jefferson		–		6	–	4	–	0
Tufts		–		3	–	2	–	2
Villanova		–		4	–	3	–	2
La Salle		–		4	–	4	–	0
Duquesne		–		3	–	5	–	3
Carnegie Tech		–		3	–	5	–	1
St. John's		–		3	–	5	–	1
CCNY		–		2	–	5	–	1
Boston University		–		2	–	7	–	0
Penn State		–		2	–	8	–	0
Princeton		–		1	–	7	–	0
Vermont		–		1	–	8	–	0
Rankings from Dickinson System

The 1931 Princeton Tigers football team was an American football team that represented Princeton University as an independent during the 1931 college football season. In their first and only season under head coach Albert Wittmer, the Tigers finished with a 1–7 record and were outscored by a total of 164 to 55.

End William H. Yeckley was elected as the team captain. No Princeton players were selected as first-team honorees on the 1931 College Football All-America Team.

Wittmer resigned as Princeton's head football coach on December 19, 1931. He retained his post the school's head basketball coach.

== Schedule ==
Date	Opponent	Site	Result	Attendance	Source
October 3	Amherst	Palmer Stadium; Princeton, NJ	W 27–0		
October 10	Brown	Palmer Stadium; Princeton, NJ	L 7–19	30,000	
October 17	at Cornell	Schoellkopf Field; Ithaca, NY	L 0–33	> 20,000	
October 24	Navy	Palmer Stadium; Princeton, NJ	L 0–15		
October 31	Michigan	Palmer Stadium; Princeton, NJ	L 0–21	14,797	
November 7	Lehigh	Palmer Stadium; Princeton, NJ	L 7–19	25,000	
November 14	Washington & Lee	Palmer Stadium; Princeton, NJ	L 0–6	13,000	
November 28	at Yale	Yale Bowl; New Haven, CT (rivalry)	L 14–51	38,000	
