= 1931 CCNY Lavender football team =

American college football season

1931 CCNY Lavender football
- Conference: Independent
- Record: 2–5–1
- Head coach: Harold J. Parker (8th season)
- Home stadium: Lewisohn Stadium

1931 Eastern college football independents records
	Conf.			Overall
Team	W	L	T	W		L		T
Bucknell		–		6	–	0	–	3
Colgate		–		8	–	1	–	0
No. 9 Pittsburgh		–		8	–	1	–	0
Cornell		–		7	–	1	–	0
Drexel		–		7	–	1	–	0
No. 7 Harvard		–		7	–	1	–	0
Temple		–		8	–	1	–	1
Columbia		–		7	–	1	–	1
Massachusetts State		–		7	–	1	–	1
Syracuse		–		7	–	1	–	1
Fordham		–		6	–	1	–	2
No. 8 Yale		–		5	–	1	–	2
Army		–		8	–	2	–	1
Franklin & Marshall		–		6	–	2	–	0
Manhattan		–		4	–	2	–	1
Brown		–		7	–	3	–	0
Providence		–		7	–	3	–	0
Penn		–		6	–	3	–	0
NYU		–		6	–	3	–	1
Boston College		–		6	–	4	–	0
Washington & Jefferson		–		6	–	4	–	0
Tufts		–		3	–	2	–	2
Villanova		–		4	–	3	–	2
La Salle		–		4	–	4	–	0
Duquesne		–		3	–	5	–	3
Carnegie Tech		–		3	–	5	–	1
St. John's		–		3	–	5	–	1
CCNY		–		2	–	5	–	1
Boston University		–		2	–	7	–	0
Penn State		–		2	–	8	–	0
Princeton		–		1	–	7	–	0
Vermont		–		1	–	8	–	0
Rankings from Dickinson System

The 1931 CCNY Lavender football team was an American football team that represented the City College of New York (CCNY) as an independent during the 1931 college football season. In their eighth season under Harold J. Parker, the Lavender team compiled a 2–5–1 record.

== Schedule ==
Date	Opponent	Site	Result	Attendance	Source
September 26	Seton Hall	Lewisohn Stadium; New York, NY	W 6–0		
October 3	at Catholic University	Brookland Stadium; Washington, DC	L 18–53		
October 10	LIU	Lewisohn Stadium; New York, NY	L 6–7		
October 17	at RPI	'86 Field; Troy, NY	L 3–13		
October 24	at Drexel	Drexel Field; Philadelphia, PA	L 0–37		
November 3	vs. Manhattan	Polo Grounds; New York, NY	T 0–0	10,000	
November 7	St. John's (NY)	Lewisohn Stadium; New York, NY	L 0–13		
November 14	Haverford	Lewisohn Stadium; New York, NY	W 14–0		
