= 1931 Washington & Jefferson Presidents football team =

American college football season

1931 Washington & Jefferson Presidents football
- Conference: Independent
- Record: 6–4
- Head coach: Bill Amos (3rd season)

1931 Eastern college football independents records
	Conf.			Overall
Team	W	L	T	W		L		T
Bucknell		–		6	–	0	–	3
Colgate		–		8	–	1	–	0
No. 9 Pittsburgh		–		8	–	1	–	0
Cornell		–		7	–	1	–	0
Drexel		–		7	–	1	–	0
No. 7 Harvard		–		7	–	1	–	0
Temple		–		8	–	1	–	1
Columbia		–		7	–	1	–	1
Massachusetts State		–		7	–	1	–	1
Syracuse		–		7	–	1	–	1
Fordham		–		6	–	1	–	2
No. 8 Yale		–		5	–	1	–	2
Army		–		8	–	2	–	1
Franklin & Marshall		–		6	–	2	–	0
Manhattan		–		4	–	2	–	1
Brown		–		7	–	3	–	0
Providence		–		7	–	3	–	0
Penn		–		6	–	3	–	0
NYU		–		6	–	3	–	1
Boston College		–		6	–	4	–	0
Washington & Jefferson		–		6	–	4	–	0
Tufts		–		3	–	2	–	2
Villanova		–		4	–	3	–	2
La Salle		–		4	–	4	–	0
Duquesne		–		3	–	5	–	3
Carnegie Tech		–		3	–	5	–	1
St. John's		–		3	–	5	–	1
CCNY		–		2	–	5	–	1
Boston University		–		2	–	7	–	0
Penn State		–		2	–	8	–	0
Princeton		–		1	–	7	–	0
Vermont		–		1	–	8	–	0
Rankings from Dickinson System

The 1931 Washington & Jefferson Presidents football team was an American football team that represented Washington & Jefferson College as an independent during the 1931 college football season. The team compiled a 6–4 record and outscored opponents by a total of 112 to 89. Bill Amos was the head coach.

== Schedule ==
Date	Opponent	Site	Result	Attendance	Source
September 26	West Virginia Wesleyan	Washington, PA	W 14–0		
October 3	Carnegie Tech	Washington, PA	W 10–7		
October 10	at Marshall	Fairfield Stadium; Huntington, WV	W 19–0	7,500	
October 17	at Western Maryland	Baltimore Stadium; Baltimore, MD	W 13–12	8,000	
October 24	at Lafayette	Fisher Field; Easton, PA	L 0–21		
October 31	at Temple	Temple Stadium; Philadelphia, PA	L 3–6	15,000	
November 7	at Marquette	Marquette Stadium; Milwaukee, WI	L 6–13		
November 14	at Bucknell	Memorial Stadium; Lewisburg, PA	L 6–10		
November 21	Western Reserve	Washington, PA	W 27–7		
November 28	vs. West Virginia	Wheeling, WV	W 14–13		
