= 1931 Army Cadets football team =

American college football season

1931 Army Cadets football
- Conference: Independent
- Record: 8–2–1
- Head coach: Ralph Sasse (2nd season)
- Captain: Charles Humber
- Home stadium: Michie Stadium

1931 Eastern college football independents records
	Conf.			Overall
Team	W	L	T	W		L		T
Bucknell		–		6	–	0	–	3
Colgate		–		8	–	1	–	0
No. 9 Pittsburgh		–		8	–	1	–	0
Cornell		–		7	–	1	–	0
Drexel		–		7	–	1	–	0
No. 7 Harvard		–		7	–	1	–	0
Temple		–		8	–	1	–	1
Columbia		–		7	–	1	–	1
Massachusetts State		–		7	–	1	–	1
Syracuse		–		7	–	1	–	1
Fordham		–		6	–	1	–	2
No. 8 Yale		–		5	–	1	–	2
Army		–		8	–	2	–	1
Franklin & Marshall		–		6	–	2	–	0
Manhattan		–		4	–	2	–	1
Brown		–		7	–	3	–	0
Providence		–		7	–	3	–	0
Penn		–		6	–	3	–	0
NYU		–		6	–	3	–	1
Boston College		–		6	–	4	–	0
Washington & Jefferson		–		6	–	4	–	0
Tufts		–		3	–	2	–	2
Villanova		–		4	–	3	–	2
La Salle		–		4	–	4	–	0
Duquesne		–		3	–	5	–	3
Carnegie Tech		–		3	–	5	–	1
St. John's		–		3	–	5	–	1
CCNY		–		2	–	5	–	1
Boston University		–		2	–	7	–	0
Penn State		–		2	–	8	–	0
Princeton		–		1	–	7	–	0
Vermont		–		1	–	8	–	0
Rankings from Dickinson System

The 1931 Army Cadets football team represented the United States Military Academy as an independent during the 1931 college football season. In their second season under head coach Ralph Sasse, the Cadets compiled an 8–2–1 record, shut out four of their eleven opponents, and outscored all opponents by a combined total of 296 to 72. In the annual Army–Navy Game, the Cadets defeated the Midshipmen 17–7. The Cadets also defeated Notre Dame, 12 to 0. Army's two losses were to Harvard by a point and a 26–0 shutout at Pittsburgh.

Right End Richard Brinsley Sheridan, Jr. broke his neck making a tackle in the tie with Yale and died two days later of his injuries.

Two Army players were recognized on the All-America team. Tackle Jack Price received first-team honors from the International News Service (INS) and Central Press Association (CP), and halfback Ray Stecker received third-team honors from the INS.

== Schedule ==
Date	Opponent	Site	Result	Attendance	Source
September 26	Ohio Northern	Michie Stadium; West Point, NY	W 60–0		
October 3	Knox	Michie Stadium; West Point, NY	W 67–6		
October 10	Michigan State	Michie Stadium; West Point, NY	W 20–7		
October 17	Harvard	Michie Stadium; West Point, NY	L 13–14		
October 24	at Yale	Yale Bowl; New Haven, CT	T 6–6	70,000	
October 31	Colorado College	Michie Stadium; West Point, NY	W 27–0		
November 7	LSU	Michie Stadium; West Point, NY	W 20–0	15,000	
November 14	at Pittsburgh	Pitt Stadium; Pittsburgh, PA	L 0–26	65,000	
November 21	Ursinus	Michie Stadium; West Point, NY	W 54–6		
November 28	vs. Notre Dame	Yankee Stadium; Bronx, NY (rivalry)	W 12–0	78,559	
December 12	vs. Navy	Yankee Stadium; Bronx, NY (Army–Navy Game)	W 17–7		
