= 1931 Massachusetts State Aggies football team =

American college football season

1931 Massachusetts State Aggies football
- Conference: Independent
- Record: 7–1–1
- Head coach: Mel Taube (1st season)
- Home stadium: Alumni Field

1931 Eastern college football independents records
	Conf.			Overall
Team	W	L	T	W		L		T
Bucknell		–		6	–	0	–	3
Colgate		–		8	–	1	–	0
No. 9 Pittsburgh		–		8	–	1	–	0
Cornell		–		7	–	1	–	0
Drexel		–		7	–	1	–	0
No. 7 Harvard		–		7	–	1	–	0
Temple		–		8	–	1	–	1
Columbia		–		7	–	1	–	1
Massachusetts State		–		7	–	1	–	1
Syracuse		–		7	–	1	–	1
Fordham		–		6	–	1	–	2
No. 8 Yale		–		5	–	1	–	2
Army		–		8	–	2	–	1
Franklin & Marshall		–		6	–	2	–	0
Manhattan		–		4	–	2	–	1
Brown		–		7	–	3	–	0
Providence		–		7	–	3	–	0
Penn		–		6	–	3	–	0
NYU		–		6	–	3	–	1
Boston College		–		6	–	4	–	0
Washington & Jefferson		–		6	–	4	–	0
Tufts		–		3	–	2	–	2
Villanova		–		4	–	3	–	2
La Salle		–		4	–	4	–	0
Duquesne		–		3	–	5	–	3
Carnegie Tech		–		3	–	5	–	1
St. John's		–		3	–	5	–	1
CCNY		–		2	–	5	–	1
Boston University		–		2	–	7	–	0
Penn State		–		2	–	8	–	0
Princeton		–		1	–	7	–	0
Vermont		–		1	–	8	–	0
Rankings from Dickinson System

The 1931 Massachusetts State Aggies football team represented Massachusetts State College in the 1931 college football season. The team was coached by Mel Taube and played its home games at Alumni Field in Amherst, Massachusetts. The 1931 season was the team's first as Mass State, following the school's name change in March of that year. Mass State enjoyed their most lopsided win in the history of the program on November 14 when they defeated Wagner by the score of 77–0; this record still stands as the team's largest margin of victory in a game. Mass State finished the season with a record of 7–1–1.

== Schedule ==
Date	Opponent	Site	Result
September 26	Cooper Union	Alumni Field; Amherst, MA	W 50–0
October 3	Bowdoin	Alumni Field; Amherst, MA	W 32–6
October 8	Middlebury	Alumni Field; Amherst, MA	W 32–6
October 17	at Norwich	Sabine Field; Northfield, VT	W 33–6
October 24	at Worcester Tech	Alumni Field; Worcester, MA	W 3–0
October 31	at Amherst	Pratt Field; Amherst, MA	W 13–12
November 7	at Springfield	Pratt Field; Springfield, MA	L 3–21
November 14	Wagner College	Alumni Field; Amherst, MA	W 77–0
November 21	Tufts	Alumni Field; Amherst, MA	T 7–7
