= 1931 St. John's Redmen football team =

College football season

1931 St. John's Redmen football
- Conference: Independent
- Record: 3–5–1
- Head coach: Ray Lynch (9th season)
- Captain: Albert Pace
- Home stadium: Dexter Park

1931 Eastern college football independents records
	Conf.			Overall
Team	W	L	T	W		L		T
Bucknell		–		6	–	0	–	3
Colgate		–		8	–	1	–	0
No. 9 Pittsburgh		–		8	–	1	–	0
Cornell		–		7	–	1	–	0
Drexel		–		7	–	1	–	0
No. 7 Harvard		–		7	–	1	–	0
Temple		–		8	–	1	–	1
Columbia		–		7	–	1	–	1
Massachusetts State		–		7	–	1	–	1
Syracuse		–		7	–	1	–	1
Fordham		–		6	–	1	–	2
No. 8 Yale		–		5	–	1	–	2
Army		–		8	–	2	–	1
Franklin & Marshall		–		6	–	2	–	0
Manhattan		–		4	–	2	–	1
Brown		–		7	–	3	–	0
Providence		–		7	–	3	–	0
Penn		–		6	–	3	–	0
NYU		–		6	–	3	–	1
Boston College		–		6	–	4	–	0
Washington & Jefferson		–		6	–	4	–	0
Tufts		–		3	–	2	–	2
Villanova		–		4	–	3	–	2
La Salle		–		4	–	4	–	0
Duquesne		–		3	–	5	–	3
Carnegie Tech		–		3	–	5	–	1
St. John's		–		3	–	5	–	1
CCNY		–		2	–	5	–	1
Boston University		–		2	–	7	–	0
Penn State		–		2	–	8	–	0
Princeton		–		1	–	7	–	0
Vermont		–		1	–	8	–	0
Rankings from Dickinson System

The 1931 St. John's Redmen football team was an American football team that represented St. John's College of New York City during the 1931 college football season. It would be the final season of varsity football at St. John's for over four decades, as on April 29, 1931, the board of trustees announced that the football program would be dropped at the conclusion of the 1931 season for financial reasons. Football returned as a student-operated club sport in 1965 and became a varsity program in 1978 before being dropped again in 2002 due to Title IX concerns. Led by ninth-year head coach Ray Lynch and quarterback Bob Sheppard, the team compiled a 3–5–1 record. The team played its home games at Dexter Park in Queens.

== Schedule ==
Date	Opponent	Site	Result	Source
September 25	LIU	Dexter Park; Queens, NY	W 22–0	
October 3	Vermont	Dexter Park; Queens, NY	W 38–7	
October 12	at Niagara	Niagara, NY	T 6–6	
October 16	Davis & Elkins	Dexter Park; Queens, NY	L 0–59	
October 23	Loyola (MD)	Dexter Park; Queens, NY	L 6–26	
October 30	St. Thomas (PA)	Dexter Park; Queens, NY	L 0–34	
November 7	at CCNY	Lewisohn Stadium; New York, NY	W 13–0	
November 14	at Providence	Providence, RI	L 12–33	
November 21	at Manhattan	Jasper Field; New York, NY	L 8–7	
