= 1931 Vermont Catamounts football team =

American college football season

1931 Vermont Catamounts football
- Conference: Independent
- Record: 1–8
- Head coach: David L. Dunn (2nd season)
- Home stadium: Centennial Field

1931 Eastern college football independents records
	Conf.			Overall
Team	W	L	T	W		L		T
Bucknell		–		6	–	0	–	3
Colgate		–		8	–	1	–	0
No. 9 Pittsburgh		–		8	–	1	–	0
Cornell		–		7	–	1	–	0
Drexel		–		7	–	1	–	0
No. 7 Harvard		–		7	–	1	–	0
Temple		–		8	–	1	–	1
Columbia		–		7	–	1	–	1
Massachusetts State		–		7	–	1	–	1
Syracuse		–		7	–	1	–	1
Fordham		–		6	–	1	–	2
No. 8 Yale		–		5	–	1	–	2
Army		–		8	–	2	–	1
Franklin & Marshall		–		6	–	2	–	0
Manhattan		–		4	–	2	–	1
Brown		–		7	–	3	–	0
Providence		–		7	–	3	–	0
Penn		–		6	–	3	–	0
NYU		–		6	–	3	–	1
Boston College		–		6	–	4	–	0
Washington & Jefferson		–		6	–	4	–	0
Tufts		–		3	–	2	–	2
Villanova		–		4	–	3	–	2
La Salle		–		4	–	4	–	0
Duquesne		–		3	–	5	–	3
Carnegie Tech		–		3	–	5	–	1
St. John's		–		3	–	5	–	1
CCNY		–		2	–	5	–	1
Boston University		–		2	–	7	–	0
Penn State		–		2	–	8	–	0
Princeton		–		1	–	7	–	0
Vermont		–		1	–	8	–	0
Rankings from Dickinson System

The 1931 Vermont Catamounts football team was an American football team that represented the University of Vermont as an independent during the 1931 college football season. In their second year under head coach David L. Dunn, the team compiled a 1–8 record. Coach Dunn resigned as head coach at the conclusion of the season.

== Schedule ==
Date	Opponent	Site	Result	Source
September 26	Union (NY)	Centennial Field; Burlington, VT	W 7–0	
October 3	at St. John's (NY)	Dexter Park; Queens, NY	L 7–38	
October 10	at Providence	Cycledrome; Providence, RI	L 13–27	
October 17	Colby	Centennial Field; Burlington, VT	L 0–6	
October 24	New Hampshire	Centennial Field; Burlington, VT	L 0–43	
October 31	at Norwich	Sabine Field; Northfield, VT	L 7–26	
November 7	at RPI	'86 Field; Troy, NY	L 0–7	
November 14	Middlebury	Centennial Field; Burlington, VT	L 12–13	
November 21	at Springfield (MA)	Pratt Field; Springfield, MA	L 0–78	
