= 1931 La Salle Explorers football team =

American college football season

1931 La Salle Explorers football
- Conference: Independent
- Record: 4–4
- Head coach: Tom Conley (1st season)
- Home stadium: Philadelphia Ball Park

1931 Eastern college football independents records
| | Conf. | | | Overall |
| Team | W | L | T | W | | L | | T |
|---|---|---|---|---|---|---|---|---|
| Bucknell | | – | | 6 | – | 0 | – | 3 |
| Colgate | | – | | 8 | – | 1 | – | 0 |
| No. 9 Pittsburgh | | – | | 8 | – | 1 | – | 0 |
| Cornell | | – | | 7 | – | 1 | – | 0 |
| Drexel | | – | | 7 | – | 1 | – | 0 |
| No. 7 Harvard | | – | | 7 | – | 1 | – | 0 |
| Temple | | – | | 8 | – | 1 | – | 1 |
| Columbia | | – | | 7 | – | 1 | – | 1 |
| Massachusetts State | | – | | 7 | – | 1 | – | 1 |
| Syracuse | | – | | 7 | – | 1 | – | 1 |
| Fordham | | – | | 6 | – | 1 | – | 2 |
| No. 8 Yale | | – | | 5 | – | 1 | – | 2 |
| Army | | – | | 8 | – | 2 | – | 1 |
| Franklin & Marshall | | – | | 6 | – | 2 | – | 0 |
| Manhattan | | – | | 4 | – | 2 | – | 1 |
| Brown | | – | | 7 | – | 3 | – | 0 |
| Providence | | – | | 7 | – | 3 | – | 0 |
| Penn | | – | | 6 | – | 3 | – | 0 |
| NYU | | – | | 6 | – | 3 | – | 1 |
| Boston College | | – | | 6 | – | 4 | – | 0 |
| Washington & Jefferson | | – | | 6 | – | 4 | – | 0 |
| Tufts | | – | | 3 | – | 2 | – | 2 |
| Villanova | | – | | 4 | – | 3 | – | 2 |
| La Salle | | – | | 4 | – | 4 | – | 0 |
| Duquesne | | – | | 3 | – | 5 | – | 3 |
| Carnegie Tech | | – | | 3 | – | 5 | – | 1 |
| St. John's | | – | | 3 | – | 5 | – | 1 |
| CCNY | | – | | 2 | – | 5 | – | 1 |
| Boston University | | – | | 2 | – | 7 | – | 0 |
| Penn State | | – | | 2 | – | 8 | – | 0 |
| Princeton | | – | | 1 | – | 7 | – | 0 |
| Vermont | | – | | 1 | – | 8 | – | 0 |
Rankings from Dickinson System

The 1931 La Salle Explorers football team was an American football team that represented La Salle College (now known as La Salle University) as an independent during the 1931 college football season. In their first year under head coach Tom Conley, the Explorers compiled a 4–4 record.

== Schedule ==
| Date | Opponent | Site | Result | Attendance | Source |
|---|---|---|---|---|---|
| September 26 | Brooklyn | Philadelphia Ball Park; Philadelphia, PA | W 26–0 | | |
| October 3 | at St. John's (MD) | Annapolis, MD | L 6–13 | | |
| October 10 | at Villanova jayvees | Villanova Stadium; Villanova, PA | W 20–0 | 2,000 | |
| October 17 | Moravian | Philadelphia Ball Park; Philadelphia, PA | W 18–6 | 6,000 | |
| October 23 | at Penn jayvees | Franklin Field; Philadelphia, PA | L 7–12 | | |
| October 31 | at Niagara | Varsity Stadium; Lewiston, NY | L 0–20 | | |
| November 7 | at Mount St. Mary's | Emmitsburg, MD | L 0–29 | | |
| November 14 | at West Chester | Wayne Field; West Chester, PA | W 6–0 | | |
