= 1931 Boston University Pioneers football team =

American college football season

1931 Boston University Pioneers football
- Conference: Independent
- Record: 1–8
- Head coach: Hilary Mahaney (2nd season)
- Home stadium: Nickerson Field

1931 Eastern college football independents records
	Conf.			Overall
Team	W	L	T	W		L		T
Bucknell		–		6	–	0	–	3
Colgate		–		8	–	1	–	0
No. 9 Pittsburgh		–		8	–	1	–	0
Cornell		–		7	–	1	–	0
Drexel		–		7	–	1	–	0
No. 7 Harvard		–		7	–	1	–	0
Temple		–		8	–	1	–	1
Columbia		–		7	–	1	–	1
Massachusetts State		–		7	–	1	–	1
Syracuse		–		7	–	1	–	1
Fordham		–		6	–	1	–	2
No. 8 Yale		–		5	–	1	–	2
Army		–		8	–	2	–	1
Franklin & Marshall		–		6	–	2	–	0
Manhattan		–		4	–	2	–	1
Brown		–		7	–	3	–	0
Providence		–		7	–	3	–	0
Penn		–		6	–	3	–	0
NYU		–		6	–	3	–	1
Boston College		–		6	–	4	–	0
Washington & Jefferson		–		6	–	4	–	0
Tufts		–		3	–	2	–	2
Villanova		–		4	–	3	–	2
La Salle		–		4	–	4	–	0
Duquesne		–		3	–	5	–	3
Carnegie Tech		–		3	–	5	–	1
St. John's		–		3	–	5	–	1
CCNY		–		2	–	5	–	1
Boston University		–		2	–	7	–	0
Penn State		–		2	–	8	–	0
Princeton		–		1	–	7	–	0
Vermont		–		1	–	8	–	0
Rankings from Dickinson System

The 1931 Boston University Pioneers football team was an American football team that represented Boston University as an independent during the 1931 college football season. In its second and final season under head coach Hilary Mahaney, the team compiled a 1–8 record, was shut out in six of nine games, and was outscored by a total of 97 to 40.

== Schedule ==
Date	Opponent	Site	Result	Attendance	Source
September 26	at Williams	Weston Field; Williamstown, MA	L 0–13		
October 3	at New Hampshire	Memorial Field; Durham, NH	L 0–6		
October 10	George Washington	Nickerson Field; Weston, MA	L 0–14	4,000	
October 17	Geneva	Nickerson Field; Weston, MA	L 0–7		
October 24	at DePauw	Blackstock Field; Greencastle, IN	L 9–14		
October 31	Rhode Island State	Nickerson Field; Weston, MA	W 25–7		
November 7	at Tufts	Tufts Oval; Medford, MA	L 0–7		
November 14	Manhattan	Nickerson Field; Weston, MA	L 0–12		
November 21	at Boston College	Fenway Park; Boston, MA (rivalry)	L 6–18		
