= 1931 Penn Quakers football team =

American college football season

1931 Penn Quakers football
- Conference: Independent
- Record: 6–3
- Head coach: Harvey Harman (1st season)
- Captain: Paul Riblett
- Home stadium: Franklin Field

1931 Eastern college football independents records
	Conf.			Overall
Team	W	L	T	W		L		T
Bucknell		–		6	–	0	–	3
Colgate		–		8	–	1	–	0
No. 9 Pittsburgh		–		8	–	1	–	0
Cornell		–		7	–	1	–	0
Drexel		–		7	–	1	–	0
No. 7 Harvard		–		7	–	1	–	0
Temple		–		8	–	1	–	1
Columbia		–		7	–	1	–	1
Massachusetts State		–		7	–	1	–	1
Syracuse		–		7	–	1	–	1
Fordham		–		6	–	1	–	2
No. 8 Yale		–		5	–	1	–	2
Army		–		8	–	2	–	1
Franklin & Marshall		–		6	–	2	–	0
Manhattan		–		4	–	2	–	1
Brown		–		7	–	3	–	0
Providence		–		7	–	3	–	0
Penn		–		6	–	3	–	0
NYU		–		6	–	3	–	1
Boston College		–		6	–	4	–	0
Washington & Jefferson		–		6	–	4	–	0
Tufts		–		3	–	2	–	2
Villanova		–		4	–	3	–	2
La Salle		–		4	–	4	–	0
Duquesne		–		3	–	5	–	3
Carnegie Tech		–		3	–	5	–	1
St. John's		–		3	–	5	–	1
CCNY		–		2	–	5	–	1
Boston University		–		2	–	7	–	0
Penn State		–		2	–	8	–	0
Princeton		–		1	–	7	–	0
Vermont		–		1	–	8	–	0
Rankings from Dickinson System

The 1931 Penn Quakers football team was an American football team that represented the University of Pennsylvania as an independent during the 1931 college football season. In their first season under head coach Harvey Harman, the Quakers compiled a 6–3 record and outscored opponents by a total of 121 to 94. The team played its home games at Franklin Field in Philadelphia.

== Schedule ==
Date	Opponent	Site	Result	Attendance	Source
October 3	Swarthmore	Franklin Field; Philadelphia, PA	W 32–7		
October 10	Franklin & Marshall	Franklin Field; Philadelphia, PA	W 14–0		
October 17	Lehigh	Franklin Field; Philadelphia, PA	W 32–0	12,000	
October 24	Wisconsin	Franklin Field; Philadelphia, PA	W 27–13	65,000	
October 31	Lafayette	Franklin Field; Philadelphia, PA	W 3–0		
November 7	Notre Dame	Notre Dame Stadium; Notre Dame, IN	L 0–49	39,173	
November 14	Georgia Tech	Franklin Field; Philadelphia, PA	W 13–12		
November 26	Cornell	Franklin Field; Philadelphia, PA (rivalry)	L 0–7		
December 5	Navy	Franklin Field; Philadelphia, PA	L 0–6		
