= 1931 Temple Owls football team =

American college football season

1931 Temple Owls football
- Conference: Independent
- Record: 8–1–1
- Head coach: Heinie Miller (7th season)
- Captain: Joseph Bannak
- Home stadium: Temple Stadium

1931 Eastern college football independents records
	Conf.			Overall
Team	W	L	T	W		L		T
Bucknell		–		6	–	0	–	3
Colgate		–		8	–	1	–	0
No. 9 Pittsburgh		–		8	–	1	–	0
Cornell		–		7	–	1	–	0
Drexel		–		7	–	1	–	0
No. 7 Harvard		–		7	–	1	–	0
Temple		–		8	–	1	–	1
Columbia		–		7	–	1	–	1
Massachusetts State		–		7	–	1	–	1
Syracuse		–		7	–	1	–	1
Fordham		–		6	–	1	–	2
No. 8 Yale		–		5	–	1	–	2
Army		–		8	–	2	–	1
Franklin & Marshall		–		6	–	2	–	0
Manhattan		–		4	–	2	–	1
Brown		–		7	–	3	–	0
Providence		–		7	–	3	–	0
Penn		–		6	–	3	–	0
NYU		–		6	–	3	–	1
Boston College		–		6	–	4	–	0
Washington & Jefferson		–		6	–	4	–	0
Tufts		–		3	–	2	–	2
Villanova		–		4	–	3	–	2
La Salle		–		4	–	4	–	0
Duquesne		–		3	–	5	–	3
Carnegie Tech		–		3	–	5	–	1
St. John's		–		3	–	5	–	1
CCNY		–		2	–	5	–	1
Boston University		–		2	–	7	–	0
Penn State		–		2	–	8	–	0
Princeton		–		1	–	7	–	0
Vermont		–		1	–	8	–	0
Rankings from Dickinson System

The 1931 Temple Owls football team was an American football team that represented Temple University as an independent during the 1931 college football season. In their seventh season under head coach Heinie Miller, the Owls compiled an 8–1–1 record and outscored opponents by a total of 158 to 42. They shut out Mount St. Mary's (33–0), Penn State (12–0), Bucknell (0–0), Haskell (6–0), and Denver (18–0), defeated Missouri (38–6), and sustained their only loss in a close game with Carnegie Tech (19–13).

The team's assistant coaches were Bert Bell, who later served as commissioner of the NFL, and Ox DaGrosa. Regular players included fullbacks Corny Bonner and Jack Driebe, halfbacks Lorne Johnson, Chris Zahnow, Jack Reynolds, and Alex Kilkuskie, quarterback Leon Whittock, ends Jack Geston and Len Gudd, tackles Karl Klinger and Jimmy Roraspaugh, guards Bill Pulley and Ed Smith, center "Bull" Lipski. Guard Joe Bannak was the team captain.

The team played its home games at Temple Stadium in Philadelphia.

== Schedule ==
Date	Opponent	Site	Result	Attendance	Source
September 25	Mount St. Mary's	Temple Stadium; Philadelphia, PA	W 33–0		
October 2	Albright	Temple Stadium; Philadelphia, PA	W 19–7		
October 10	Penn State	Temple Stadium; Philadelphia, PA	W 12–0	20,000	
October 16	Bucknell	Temple Stadium; Philadelphia, PA	T 0–0		
October 23	Haskell	Temple Stadium; Philadelphia, PA	W 6–0	30,000	
October 30	Washington & Jefferson	Temple Stadium; Philadelphia, PA	W 6–3	15,000	
November 7	Villanova	Temple Stadium; Philadelphia, PA	W 13–7	30,000	
November 14	Carnegie Tech^{†}	Temple Stadium; Philadelphia, PA	L 13–19	18,000	
November 21	at Denver	DU Stadium; Denver, CO	W 18–0	< 1,500	
November 28	vs. Missouri	Muehlebach Field; Kansas City, MO	W 38–6		
^{†}Homecoming
