= 1931 Penn State Nittany Lions football team =

American college football season

1931 Penn State Nittany Lions football
- Conference: Independent
- Record: 2–8
- Head coach: Bob Higgins (2nd season)
- Captain: George Lasich
- Home stadium: New Beaver Field

1931 Eastern college football independents records
	Conf.			Overall
Team	W	L	T	W		L		T
Bucknell		–		6	–	0	–	3
Colgate		–		8	–	1	–	0
No. 9 Pittsburgh		–		8	–	1	–	0
Cornell		–		7	–	1	–	0
Drexel		–		7	–	1	–	0
No. 7 Harvard		–		7	–	1	–	0
Temple		–		8	–	1	–	1
Columbia		–		7	–	1	–	1
Massachusetts State		–		7	–	1	–	1
Syracuse		–		7	–	1	–	1
Fordham		–		6	–	1	–	2
No. 8 Yale		–		5	–	1	–	2
Army		–		8	–	2	–	1
Franklin & Marshall		–		6	–	2	–	0
Manhattan		–		4	–	2	–	1
Brown		–		7	–	3	–	0
Providence		–		7	–	3	–	0
Penn		–		6	–	3	–	0
NYU		–		6	–	3	–	1
Boston College		–		6	–	4	–	0
Washington & Jefferson		–		6	–	4	–	0
Tufts		–		3	–	2	–	2
Villanova		–		4	–	3	–	2
La Salle		–		4	–	4	–	0
Duquesne		–		3	–	5	–	3
Carnegie Tech		–		3	–	5	–	1
St. John's		–		3	–	5	–	1
CCNY		–		2	–	5	–	1
Boston University		–		2	–	7	–	0
Penn State		–		2	–	8	–	0
Princeton		–		1	–	7	–	0
Vermont		–		1	–	8	–	0
Rankings from Dickinson System

The 1931 Penn State Nittany Lions football team represented the Pennsylvania State University as an independent during the 1931 college football season. The team was coached by Bob Higgins and played its home games in New Beaver Field in State College, Pennsylvania.

== Schedule ==
Date	Opponent	Site	Result	Attendance	Source
September 26	Waynesburg	New Beaver Field; State College, PA	L 0–7	3,000	
October 3	Lebanon Valley	New Beaver Field; State College, PA	W 19–6	4,000	
October 10	at Temple	Temple Stadium; Philadelphia, PA	L 0–12	20,000	
October 17	Dickinson	New Beaver Field; State College, PA	L 6–10	5,000	
October 24	at Syracuse	Archbold Stadium; Syracuse, NY (rivalry)	L 0–7		
October 31	Pittsburgh^{†}	New Beaver Field; State College, PA (rivalry)	L 6–41	7,000	
November 7	Colgate	New Beaver Field; State College, PA	L 7–32	5,000	
November 14	at Lafayette	Fisher Field; Easton, PA	L 0–33		
November 21	at West Virginia	Mountaineer Field; Morgantown, WV (rivalry)	L 0–19	10,000	
November 28	vs. Lehigh	Franklin Field; Philadelphia, PA	W 31–0	2,500	
^{†}Homecoming
