= 1931 Syracuse Orangemen football team =

American college football season

1931 Syracuse Orangemen football
- Conference: Independent
- Record: 7–1–1
- Head coach: Vic Hanson (2nd season)
- Captain: George Ellert
- Home stadium: Archbold Stadium

1931 Eastern college football independents records
	Conf.			Overall
Team	W	L	T	W		L		T
Bucknell		–		6	–	0	–	3
Colgate		–		8	–	1	–	0
No. 9 Pittsburgh		–		8	–	1	–	0
Cornell		–		7	–	1	–	0
Drexel		–		7	–	1	–	0
No. 7 Harvard		–		7	–	1	–	0
Temple		–		8	–	1	–	1
Columbia		–		7	–	1	–	1
Massachusetts State		–		7	–	1	–	1
Syracuse		–		7	–	1	–	1
Fordham		–		6	–	1	–	2
No. 8 Yale		–		5	–	1	–	2
Army		–		8	–	2	–	1
Franklin & Marshall		–		6	–	2	–	0
Manhattan		–		4	–	2	–	1
Brown		–		7	–	3	–	0
Providence		–		7	–	3	–	0
Penn		–		6	–	3	–	0
NYU		–		6	–	3	–	1
Boston College		–		6	–	4	–	0
Washington & Jefferson		–		6	–	4	–	0
Tufts		–		3	–	2	–	2
Villanova		–		4	–	3	–	2
La Salle		–		4	–	4	–	0
Duquesne		–		3	–	5	–	3
Carnegie Tech		–		3	–	5	–	1
St. John's		–		3	–	5	–	1
CCNY		–		2	–	5	–	1
Boston University		–		2	–	7	–	0
Penn State		–		2	–	8	–	0
Princeton		–		1	–	7	–	0
Vermont		–		1	–	8	–	0
Rankings from Dickinson System

The 1931 Syracuse Orangemen football team represented Syracuse University as an independent during the 1931 college football season. The Orangemen were led by second-year head coach Vic Hanson and played their home games at Archbold Stadium in Syracuse, New York.

== Schedule ==
Date	Opponent	Site	Result	Attendance	Source
September 26	St. Lawrence	Archbold Stadium; Syracuse, NY	W 46–6	12,000	
October 3	Hobart	Archbold Stadium; Syracuse, NY	W 49–0	10,000	
October 10	Ohio Wesleyan	Archbold Stadium; Syracuse, NY	W 48–7	10,000	
October 17	Florida	Archbold Stadium; Syracuse, NY	W 33–12	14,000	
October 24	Penn State	Archbold Stadium; Syracuse, NY (rivalry)	W 7–0	20,000	
October 31	at Michigan State	College Field; East Lansing, MI	W 15–10	15,000	
November 7	Western Reserve	Archbold Stadium; Syracuse, NY	W 33–0	7,000	
November 14	Colgate	Archbold Stadium; Syracuse, NY (rivalry)	L 7–21	35,000	
November 21	at Columbia	Baker Field; New York, NY	T 0–0	35,000	
