= 1931 NYU Violets football team =

American college football season

1931 NYU Violets football
- Conference: Independent
- Record: 6–3–1
- Head coach: Chick Meehan (7th season)
- Home stadium: Polo Grounds; Yankee Stadium

1931 Eastern college football independents records
	Conf.			Overall
Team	W	L	T	W		L		T
Bucknell		–		6	–	0	–	3
Colgate		–		8	–	1	–	0
No. 9 Pittsburgh		–		8	–	1	–	0
Cornell		–		7	–	1	–	0
Drexel		–		7	–	1	–	0
No. 7 Harvard		–		7	–	1	–	0
Temple		–		8	–	1	–	1
Columbia		–		7	–	1	–	1
Massachusetts State		–		7	–	1	–	1
Syracuse		–		7	–	1	–	1
Fordham		–		6	–	1	–	2
No. 8 Yale		–		5	–	1	–	2
Army		–		8	–	2	–	1
Franklin & Marshall		–		6	–	2	–	0
Manhattan		–		4	–	2	–	1
Brown		–		7	–	3	–	0
Providence		–		7	–	3	–	0
Penn		–		6	–	3	–	0
NYU		–		6	–	3	–	1
Boston College		–		6	–	4	–	0
Washington & Jefferson		–		6	–	4	–	0
Tufts		–		3	–	2	–	2
Villanova		–		4	–	3	–	2
La Salle		–		4	–	4	–	0
Duquesne		–		3	–	5	–	3
Carnegie Tech		–		3	–	5	–	1
St. John's		–		3	–	5	–	1
CCNY		–		2	–	5	–	1
Boston University		–		2	–	7	–	0
Penn State		–		2	–	8	–	0
Princeton		–		1	–	7	–	0
Vermont		–		1	–	8	–	0
Rankings from Dickinson System

The 1931 NYU Violets football team was an American football team that represented New York University as an independent during the 1931 college football season. The team was led by head coach Chick Meehan in his seventh season and finished with a 6–3–1 record.

== Schedule ==
Date	Opponent	Site	Result	Attendance	Source
September 26	Hobart	Polo Grounds; New York, NY	W 65–0	12,000	
October 3	West Virginia Wesleyan	Yankee Stadium; Bronx, NY	W 54–0	16,000	
October 10	Georgetown	Yankee Stadium; Bronx, NY	W 34–0	35,000	
October 17	Rutgers	Yankee Stadium; Bronx, NY	W 27–7	15,000	
October 24	Colgate	Yankee Stadium; Bronx, NY	W 13–0	50,000	
October 31	Oregon	Yankee Stadium; Bronx, NY	L 6–14	20,000	
November 7	Georgia	Yankee Stadium; Bronx, NY	L 6–7	65,000	
November 14	vs. Fordham	Yankee Stadium; Bronx, NY	T 0–0	80,000	
November 26	Carnegie Tech	Yankee Stadium; Bronx, NY	W 7–6	25,000	
December 5	Tennessee	Yankee Stadium; Bronx, NY	L 0–13	40,000	
