= 1931 Bucknell Bison football team =

American college football season

1931 Bucknell Bison football
- Conference: Independent
- Record: 6–0–3
- Head coach: Carl Snavely (5th season)
- Home stadium: Memorial Stadium

1931 Eastern college football independents records
	Conf.			Overall
Team	W	L	T	W		L		T
Bucknell		–		6	–	0	–	3
Colgate		–		8	–	1	–	0
No. 9 Pittsburgh		–		8	–	1	–	0
Cornell		–		7	–	1	–	0
Drexel		–		7	–	1	–	0
No. 7 Harvard		–		7	–	1	–	0
Temple		–		8	–	1	–	1
Columbia		–		7	–	1	–	1
Massachusetts State		–		7	–	1	–	1
Syracuse		–		7	–	1	–	1
Fordham		–		6	–	1	–	2
No. 8 Yale		–		5	–	1	–	2
Army		–		8	–	2	–	1
Franklin & Marshall		–		6	–	2	–	0
Manhattan		–		4	–	2	–	1
Brown		–		7	–	3	–	0
Providence		–		7	–	3	–	0
Penn		–		6	–	3	–	0
NYU		–		6	–	3	–	1
Boston College		–		6	–	4	–	0
Washington & Jefferson		–		6	–	4	–	0
Tufts		–		3	–	2	–	2
Villanova		–		4	–	3	–	2
La Salle		–		4	–	4	–	0
Duquesne		–		3	–	5	–	3
Carnegie Tech		–		3	–	5	–	1
St. John's		–		3	–	5	–	1
CCNY		–		2	–	5	–	1
Boston University		–		2	–	7	–	0
Penn State		–		2	–	8	–	0
Princeton		–		1	–	7	–	0
Vermont		–		1	–	8	–	0
Rankings from Dickinson System

The 1931 Bucknell Bison football team was an American football team that represented Bucknell University as an independent during the 1931 college football season. In its fifth season under head coach Carl Snavely, the team compiled a 6–0–3 record.

The team played its home games at Christy Mathewson Memorial Stadium in Lewisburg, Pennsylvania.

== Schedule ==
Date	Time	Opponent	Site	Result	Attendance	Source
September 25		St. Thomas (PA)	Memorial Stadium; Lewisburg, PA	W 34–7	7,000	
October 3		at Geneva	Beaver Falls, PA	T 14–14		
October 10		Albright	Memorial Stadium; Lewisburg, PA	W 23–7		
October 16		at Temple	Temple Stadium; Philadelphia, PA	T 0–0		
October 24		Gettysburg^{†}	Memorial Stadium; Lewisburg, PA	W 46–0		
October 31	2:00 p.m.	vs. Villanova	Brooks Field; Scranton, PA	T 0–0	10,000	
November 7		at Georgetown	Griffith Stadium; Washington, DC	W 7–0		
November 14		Washington & Jefferson	Memorial Stadium; Lewisburg, PA	W 10–6		
November 21		at Fordham	Polo Grounds; New York, NY	W 14–13	25,000	
^{†}Homecoming; All times are in Eastern time
