= 1931 Drexel Dragons football team =

American college football season

1931 Drexel Dragons football
- Conference: Independent
- Record: 7–1
- Head coach: Walter Halas (5th season)
- Captain: Mike Labove
- Home stadium: Drexel Field

1931 Eastern college football independents records
	Conf.			Overall
Team	W	L	T	W		L		T
Bucknell		–		6	–	0	–	3
Colgate		–		8	–	1	–	0
No. 9 Pittsburgh		–		8	–	1	–	0
Cornell		–		7	–	1	–	0
Drexel		–		7	–	1	–	0
No. 7 Harvard		–		7	–	1	–	0
Temple		–		8	–	1	–	1
Columbia		–		7	–	1	–	1
Massachusetts State		–		7	–	1	–	1
Syracuse		–		7	–	1	–	1
Fordham		–		6	–	1	–	2
No. 8 Yale		–		5	–	1	–	2
Army		–		8	–	2	–	1
Franklin & Marshall		–		6	–	2	–	0
Manhattan		–		4	–	2	–	1
Brown		–		7	–	3	–	0
Providence		–		7	–	3	–	0
Penn		–		6	–	3	–	0
NYU		–		6	–	3	–	1
Boston College		–		6	–	4	–	0
Washington & Jefferson		–		6	–	4	–	0
Tufts		–		3	–	2	–	2
Villanova		–		4	–	3	–	2
La Salle		–		4	–	4	–	0
Duquesne		–		3	–	5	–	3
Carnegie Tech		–		3	–	5	–	1
St. John's		–		3	–	5	–	1
CCNY		–		2	–	5	–	1
Boston University		–		2	–	7	–	0
Penn State		–		2	–	8	–	0
Princeton		–		1	–	7	–	0
Vermont		–		1	–	8	–	0
Rankings from Dickinson System

1931 Drexel Dragons football team represented Drexel Institute—now known as Drexel University—in the 1931 college football season. Led by Walter Halas in his fifth season as head coach, the team compiled a record of 7–1.

== Schedule ==
Date	Time	Opponent	Site	Result	Attendance	Source
September 26		Moravian	Drexel Field; Philadelphia, PA	W 26–0		
October 3		at Rutgers	Neilson Field; New Brunswick, NJ	L 6–27	5,000	
October 10		at Juniata	Huntingdon, PA	W 13–7		
October 17	2:00 pm	West Chester	Drexel Field; Philadelphia, PA	W 12–0		
October 24		CCNY	Drexel Field; Philadelphia, PA	W 37–0		
October 31	2:00 pm	Washington College	Drexel Field; Philadelphia, PA	W 44–0		
November 7	2:00 pm	Ursinus	Drexel Field; Philadelphia, PA	W 12–7		
November 14	2:00 pm	at Saint Joseph's	54th and City Line; Philadelphia, PA	W 21–0		
All times are in Eastern time

== Roster ==
1931 Drexel Dragons football team roster
Players
Coaches
Offense

Pos.	#	Name	Class
TE	72	Wirth
OT	76	Ed Marsh
G	45	Walt MacFayden	Sr
C	47	Al Eckelmeyer
G	60	Keller
OT	83	Ted Markle
TE	58	Hoff
HB	68	Charlie Knapp
HB	31	John Gabriel
FB	1	Mike LaBove (C)	Sr
QB	53	Frank Burns
TE	17	Wallace
TE	20	Kelly
OT	23	Dean
HB	24	Henry Schoeller
FB	25	Jim Donnelley
G	30	Tom Lukens
TE	57	Wright
C	59	Harry Brevda
HB	64	Sam Potter
QB	70	Myron Fleming
FB	71	Ralph Petchik
C	73	Jimmy Ellis
OT	77	Martin
TE	79	Reynolds
QB	85	Klerlein
HB	86	Goddard

Defense

Pos.	#	Name	Class

Special teams

Pos.	#	Name	Class

Head coach

- Walter Halas (Illinois)

Coordinators/assistant coaches

- Albert H. Repscha (Maine)
- Rae Crowther (Colgate)

Legend

- (C) Team captain
- (S) Suspended
- (I) Ineligible
- Injured
- Redshirt
