= 1931 Villanova Wildcats football team =

American college football season

1931 Villanova Wildcats football
- Conference: Independent
- Record: 4–3–2
- Head coach: Harry Stuhldreher (7th season)
- Captain: Edward Kobilis
- Home stadium: Villanova Stadium

1931 Eastern college football independents records
	Conf.			Overall
Team	W	L	T	W		L		T
Bucknell		–		6	–	0	–	3
Colgate		–		8	–	1	–	0
No. 9 Pittsburgh		–		8	–	1	–	0
Cornell		–		7	–	1	–	0
Drexel		–		7	–	1	–	0
No. 7 Harvard		–		7	–	1	–	0
Temple		–		8	–	1	–	1
Columbia		–		7	–	1	–	1
Massachusetts State		–		7	–	1	–	1
Syracuse		–		7	–	1	–	1
Fordham		–		6	–	1	–	2
No. 8 Yale		–		5	–	1	–	2
Army		–		8	–	2	–	1
Franklin & Marshall		–		6	–	2	–	0
Manhattan		–		4	–	2	–	1
Brown		–		7	–	3	–	0
Providence		–		7	–	3	–	0
Penn		–		6	–	3	–	0
NYU		–		6	–	3	–	1
Boston College		–		6	–	4	–	0
Washington & Jefferson		–		6	–	4	–	0
Tufts		–		3	–	2	–	2
Villanova		–		4	–	3	–	2
La Salle		–		4	–	4	–	0
Duquesne		–		3	–	5	–	3
Carnegie Tech		–		3	–	5	–	1
St. John's		–		3	–	5	–	1
CCNY		–		2	–	5	–	1
Boston University		–		2	–	7	–	0
Penn State		–		2	–	8	–	0
Princeton		–		1	–	7	–	0
Vermont		–		1	–	8	–	0
Rankings from Dickinson System

The 1931 Villanova Wildcats football team represented the Villanova University during the 1931 college football season. The head coach was Harry Stuhldreher, coaching his seventh season with the Wildcats. The team played their home games at Villanova Stadium in Villanova, Pennsylvania.

== Schedule ==
Date	Time	Opponent	Site	Result	Attendance	Source
September 26		Loyola (MD)	Villanova Stadium; Villanova, PA	W 32–0		
October 3		Gettysburg	Villanova Stadium; Villanova, PA	W 19–0		
October 10		at Duke	Duke Stadium; Durham, NC	L 0–18		
October 17		Boston College	Fenway Park; Boston, MA	W 12–6		
October 24		at Baltimore	Villanova Stadium; Villanova, PA	W 61–6		
October 31	2:00 p.m.	vs. Bucknell	Brooks Field; Scranton, PA	T 0–0	10,000	
November 7		at Temple	Temple Stadium; Philadelphia, PA	L 7–13	30,000	
November 14		at Detroit	University of Detroit Stadium; Detroit, MI	T 0–0		
November 21		Georgetown	Villanova Stadium; Villanova, PA	L 6–13		
All times are in Eastern time
