= Eastern Pennsylvania Conference (disambiguation) =

Eastern Pennsylvania Conference may refer to:

- Eastern Pennsylvania Conference, high school sports conference in eastern Pennsylvania
- Eastern Pennsylvania Collegiate Basketball League, former collegiate basketball conference
- Eastern Pennsylvania Collegiate Conference (1926), former collegiate football conference

== See also ==
- West Penn Conference, a former collegiate athletic conference
