= Harold Burry =

American football coach and college athletics administrator

Biographical details
- Born: May 31, 1912; New Castle, Pennsylvania, U.S.
- Died: September 5, 1992 (aged 80); New Castle, Pennsylvania, U.S.

Coaching career (HC unless noted)

Football
- 1935–1943: Ellwood City HS (PA)
- 1952–1971: Westminster (PA)

Head coaching record
- Overall: 127–31–5 (college football)
- Tournaments: 2–1–1 (NAIA D-II playoffs)

Accomplishments and honors

Championships
- 1 NAIA Division II (1970); 7 WPC (1958–1964)
- College Football Hall of Fame; Inducted in 1996 (profile)

Harold E. Burry (May 31, 1912 – September 5, 1992) was an American football coach and college athletics administrator. He served as the head football coach at Westminster College in New Wilmington, Pennsylvania from 1952 to 1971, compiling a record of 127–31–5. Burry also coached a number of other sports at Westminster and was the school's athletic director from 1961 to 1977. He was inducted into the College Football Hall of Fame in 1996.

Burry graduated from Westminster College in 1935. He began his coaching career at Ellwood City High School in Ellwood City, Pennsylvania, where he was head football coach from 1935 to 1943. Burry returned to Westminster in 1946 to coach soccer, swimming, track, and cross country.

== Head coaching record ==
=== College football ===
Year	Team	Overall	Conference	Standing	Bowl/playoffs
Westminster Titans (Independent) (1952–1957)
1952	Westminster	6–2			
1953	Westminster	8–0			
1954	Westminster	6–1			
1955	Westminster	6–0–1			
1956	Westminster	8–0			
1957	Westminster	4–4			
Westminster Titans (West Penn Conference) (1958–1968)
1958	Westminster	6–1–1	3–1	1st	
1959	Westminster	6–2	5–0	1st	
1960	Westminster	5–3	5–0	1st	
1961	Westminster	6–2	4–1	1st	
1962	Westminster	6–2	5–0	1st	
1963	Westminster	5–2–1	2–1	T–1st	
1964	Westminster	8–0	3–0	1st	
1965	Westminster	5–3	2–1	2nd	
1966	Westminster	6–2–1	1–1–1	3rd	
1967	Westminster	6–2	2–1	2nd	
1968	Westminster	6–2	1–1	2nd	
Westminster Titans (NAIA / NAIA Division II independent) (1969–1971)
1969	Westminster	6–2			
1970	Westminster	10–0			W NAIA Division II Championship
1971	Westminster	8–1–1			L NAIA Division II Championship
Westminster:		127–35–1	33–7–1		
Total:		127–35–1			
National championship Conference title Conference division title or championship game berth
