= 1961 West Penn Conference football season =

- Sport: Football
- Number of teams: 6
- Champion: Westminster (PA)

Football seasons
- ← 1960 1962 →

1961 West Penn Conference football standings
	Conf.					Overall
Team	W		L		T	W		L		T
Westminster (PA) $	4	–	1	–	0	6	–	2	–	0
Grove City	2	–	0	–	0	5	–	4	–	0
Waynesburg	2	–	2	–	0	6	–	2	–	0
Saint Vincent	2	–	2	–	0	3	–	3	–	1
Geneva	1	–	2	–	0	4	–	4	–	0
Carnegie Tech	0	–	4	–	0	1	–	7	–	0
$ – Conference champion

The 1961 West Penn Conference football season was the season of college football played by the six member schools of the West Penn Conference (WPC) as part of the 1961 college football season. The 1961 Westminster Titans football team compiled a 6–2 record (4–1 against conference opponents) and won the conference championship.

== Teams ==
=== Westminster ===
1961 Westminster Titans football

WPC champion
- Conference: West Penn Conference
- Record: 6–2 (4–1 WPC)
- Head coach: Harold Burry (10th season)

The 1961 Westminster Titans football team represented Westminster College of New Wilmington, Pennsylvania. In their tenth year under head coach Harold Burry, the team compiled a 6–2 record (4–1 against WPC opponents) and won the WPC championship.

Date	Opponent	Site	Result	Attendance	Source
September 30	Indiana (PA)*	New Wilmington, PA	W 19–7		
October 7	Grove City	New Wilmington, PA	L 13–21		
October 14	at Geneva	Beaver Falls, PA	W 7–0	6,000	
October 21	Saint Vincent	New Wilmington, PA	W 28–7	4,400	
October 28	at Waynesburg	Waynesburg, PA	W 7–6		
November 4	Slippery Rock*	New Wilmington, PA	L 14–21		
November 11	Carnegie Tech	New Wilmington, PA	W 35–7		
November 18	at Juanita*	Huntingdon, PA	W 14–7		
*Non-conference game

=== Grove City ===
1961 Grove City Wolverines football
- Conference: West Penn Conference
- Record: 5–4 (2–0 WPC)
- Head coach: Jack Behringer (6th season)

The 1961 Grove City Wolverines football team represented Grove City College of Grove City, Pennsylvania. In their sixth year under head coach Jack Behringer, the team compiled a 5–4 record (2–0 against WPC opponents) and finished in second place in the WPC.

Date	Opponent	Site	Result	Attendance	Source
September 23	at Frederick*	Portsmouth, VA	L 6–20	5,600	
September 30	Clarion*	Grove City, PA	L 0–20		
October 7	at Westminster (PA)	New Wilmington, PA	W 21–13		
October 14	at Carnegie Tech	Tech Field; Pittsburgh, PA	W 26–13		
October 21	Delaware Valley^{†}*	Grove City, PA	L 0–6		
October 28	Alfred*	Grove City, PA	W 31–14	1,700	
November 4	Allegheny*	Grove City, PA	L 0–26	5,000	
November 11	Washington & Jefferson*	Grove City, PA	W 26–0		
November 18	Hiram*	Hiram, OH	W 22–8		
*Non-conference game; ^{†}Homecoming

=== Waynesburg ===
1961 Waynesburg Yellow Jackets football
- Conference: West Penn Conference
- Record: 6–2 (2–2 WPC)
- Head coach: Peter Mazzaferro (3rd season)

The 1961 Waynesburg Yellow Jackets football team represented Waynesburg University of Waynesburg, Pennsylvania. In their third year under head coach Peter Mazzaferro, the team compiled a 6–2 record (2–2 against WPC opponents) and finished in a tie for third place in the WPC.

Date	Opponent	Site	Result	Attendance	Source
September 23	at Geneva	Reeves Stadium; Beaver Falls, PA	L 0–14	4,000	
September 30	vs. Carnegie Tech	Uniontown, PA	W 26–0		
October 7	Slippery Rock*	Waynesburg, PA	W 18–7	2,500	
October 14	at Saint Vincent	Latrobe, PA	W 7–0		
October 21	at Frostburg State*	Frostburg, MD	W 24–7		
October 28	Westminster (PA)	Waynesburg, PA	L 6–7		
November 4	at California (PA)*	California, PA	W 12–7		
November 11	Marietta*	Waynesburg, PA	W 32–7		
*Non-conference game

=== Saint Vincent ===
1961 Saint Vincent Bearcats football
- Conference: West Penn Conference
- Record: 3–3–1 (2–2 WPC)
- Head coach: Al DeLuca (14th season)

The 1961 Saint Vincent Bearcats football team represented Saint Vincent College of Latrobe, Pennsylvania. In their 14th year under head coach Al DeLuca, the team compiled a 3–3–1 record (2–2 against WPC opponents) and finished in a tie for third place in the WPC.

Date	Opponent	Site	Result	Attendance	Source
September 23	at Carnegie Tech	Tech Field; Pittsburgh, PA	W 20–7		
September 29	Geneva	Latrobe, PA	W 13–7	5,200	
October 7	vs. California (PA)*	Charleroi, PA	L 0–7	3,500	
October 14	Waynesburg	Latrobe, PA	L 0–7		
October 21	at Westminster (PA)	New Wilmington, PA	L 7–28		
October 28	King's (PA)*	Latrobe, PA	W 40–12		
November 4	at Lock Haven*	Lock Haven, PA	T 7–7		
*Non-conference game

=== Geneva ===
1961 Geneva Golden Tornadoes football
- Conference: West Penn Conference
- Record: 4–4 (2–2 WPC)
- Head coach: Byron E. Morgan (9th season)

The 1961 Geneva Golden Tornadoes football team represented Geneva College of Beaver Falls, Pennsylvania. In their ninth year under head coach Byron E. Morgan, the team compiled a 4–4 record (2–2 against WPC opponents) and finished in a tie for third place in the WPC.

Date	Opponent	Site	Result	Attendance	Source
September 23	Waynesburg	Reeves Stadium; Beaver Falls, PA	W 14–0	4,000	
September 29	at Saint Vincent	Latrobe, PA	L 7–13	5,200	
October 7	at Southern Connecticut State*	New Haven, CT	L 0–60	4,500	
October 14	Westminster (PA)	Beaver Falls, PA	L 0–7	6,000	
October 21	at Juniata*	Huntingdon, PA	L 16–19		
November 4	at Indiana (PA)*	Indiana, PA	W 6–0		
November 11	Lycoming*	Beaver Falls, PA	W 26–7		
November 18	Marietta	Beaver Falls, PA	W 26–20	5,000	
*Non-conference game

=== Carnegie Tech ===
1961 Carnegie Tech Tartans football
- Conference: West Penn Conference
- Record: 1–7 (0–4 WPC)
- Head coach: Edward Hirshberg (2nd season)
- Home stadium: Tech Field

The 1961 Carnegie Tech Tartans football team represented Carnegie Institute of Technology (now known as Carnegie Mellon University) of Pittsburgh, Pennsylvania. In their second year under head coach Edward Hirshberg, the team compiled a 1–7 record (0–4 against WPC opponents) and finished in last place in the WPC.

Date	Opponent	Site	Result	Attendance	Source
September 23	Saint Vincent	Tech Field; Pittsburgh, PA	L 7–20		
September 30	vs. Waynesburg	Uniontown, PA	L 0–26		
October 7	at Oberlin*	Oberlin, OH	L 7–26		
October 14	Grove City	Tech Field; Pittsburgh, PA	L 13–26		
October 21	Franklin & Marshall^{†}*	Tech Field; Pittsburgh, PA	L 14–20	4,700	
October 28	at Rochester*	Fauver Stadium; Rochester, NY	L 6–14	5,000	
November 11	at Westminster (PA)	New Wilmington, PA	L 7–35		
November 18	Washington & Jefferson*	Tech Field; Pittsburgh, PA	W 34–2	1,800	
*Non-conference game; ^{†}Homecoming
