= 1931 Pittsburgh Panthers football team =

American college football season

1931 Pittsburgh Panthers football
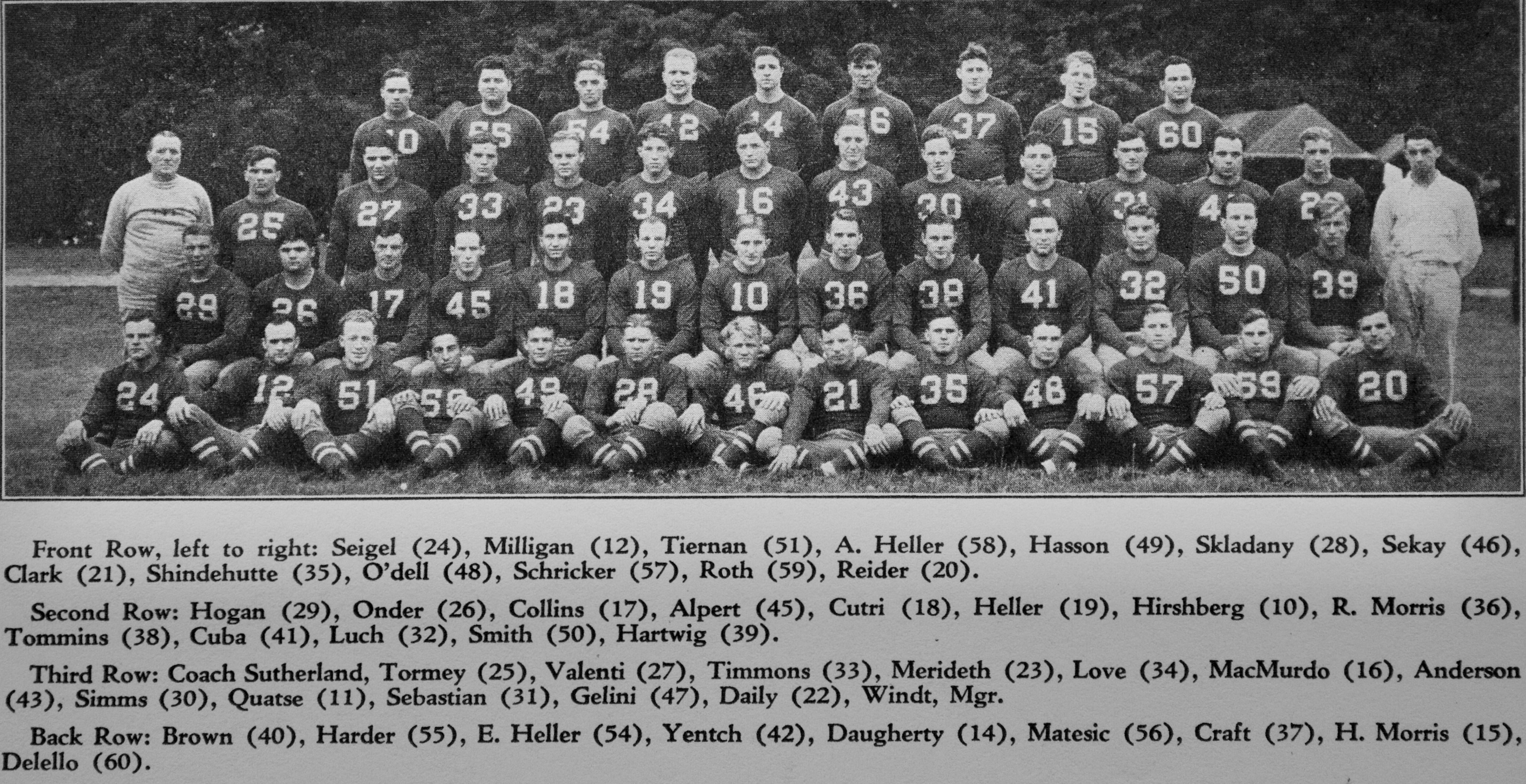

Co-national champion (Parke H. Davis) Eastern champion
- Conference: Independent
- Record: 8–1
- Head coach: Jock Sutherland (8th season)
- Offensive scheme: Single-wing
- Captain: Edward Hirshberg
- Home stadium: Pitt Stadium

1931 Eastern college football independents records
	Conf.			Overall
Team	W	L	T	W		L		T
Bucknell		–		6	–	0	–	3
Colgate		–		8	–	1	–	0
No. 9 Pittsburgh		–		8	–	1	–	0
Cornell		–		7	–	1	–	0
Drexel		–		7	–	1	–	0
No. 7 Harvard		–		7	–	1	–	0
Temple		–		8	–	1	–	1
Columbia		–		7	–	1	–	1
Massachusetts State		–		7	–	1	–	1
Syracuse		–		7	–	1	–	1
Fordham		–		6	–	1	–	2
No. 8 Yale		–		5	–	1	–	2
Army		–		8	–	2	–	1
Franklin & Marshall		–		6	–	2	–	0
Manhattan		–		4	–	2	–	1
Brown		–		7	–	3	–	0
Providence		–		7	–	3	–	0
Penn		–		6	–	3	–	0
NYU		–		6	–	3	–	1
Boston College		–		6	–	4	–	0
Washington & Jefferson		–		6	–	4	–	0
Tufts		–		3	–	2	–	2
Villanova		–		4	–	3	–	2
La Salle		–		4	–	4	–	0
Duquesne		–		3	–	5	–	3
Carnegie Tech		–		3	–	5	–	1
St. John's		–		3	–	5	–	1
CCNY		–		2	–	5	–	1
Boston University		–		2	–	7	–	0
Penn State		–		2	–	8	–	0
Princeton		–		1	–	7	–	0
Vermont		–		1	–	8	–	0
Rankings from Dickinson System

The 1931 Pittsburgh Panthers football team, coached by Jock Sutherland, represented the University of Pittsburgh as an independent during the 1931 college football season. The Panthers finished the regular season with eight wins and a single loss at Notre Dame and were considered the champions of the East. Parke H. Davis, recognized as a "major selector" in the official NCAA football records book, named Pitt as one of that season's co-national champions. The team is also recognized as national champion in 1931 by College Football Data Warehouse and according to a Sports Illustrated study that has served as the historical basis of the university's historical national championship claims since its original publication.

== Schedule ==
Date	Opponent	Site	Result	Attendance	Source
September 26	Miami (OH)	Pitt Stadium; Pittsburgh, PA	W 61–0	12,000	
October 3	at Iowa	Iowa Stadium; Iowa City, IA	W 20–0	12,000	
October 10	West Virginia	Pitt Stadium; Pittsburgh, PA (rivalry)	W 34–0	18,000–20,000	
October 17	Western Reserve	Pitt Stadium; Pittsburgh, PA	W 32–0	5,000	
October 24	at Notre Dame	Notre Dame Stadium; Notre Dame, IN (rivalry)	L 12–25	37,394–42,000	
October 31	at Penn State	New Beaver Field; University Park, PA (rivalry)	W 41–6	7,000–10,000	
November 7	Carnegie Tech	Pitt Stadium; Pittsburgh, PA	W 14–6	25,000	
November 14	Army	Pitt Stadium; Pittsburgh, PA	W 26–0	65,000	
November 26	Nebraska	Pitt Stadium; Pittsburgh, PA	W 40–0	25,368	

== Preseason ==
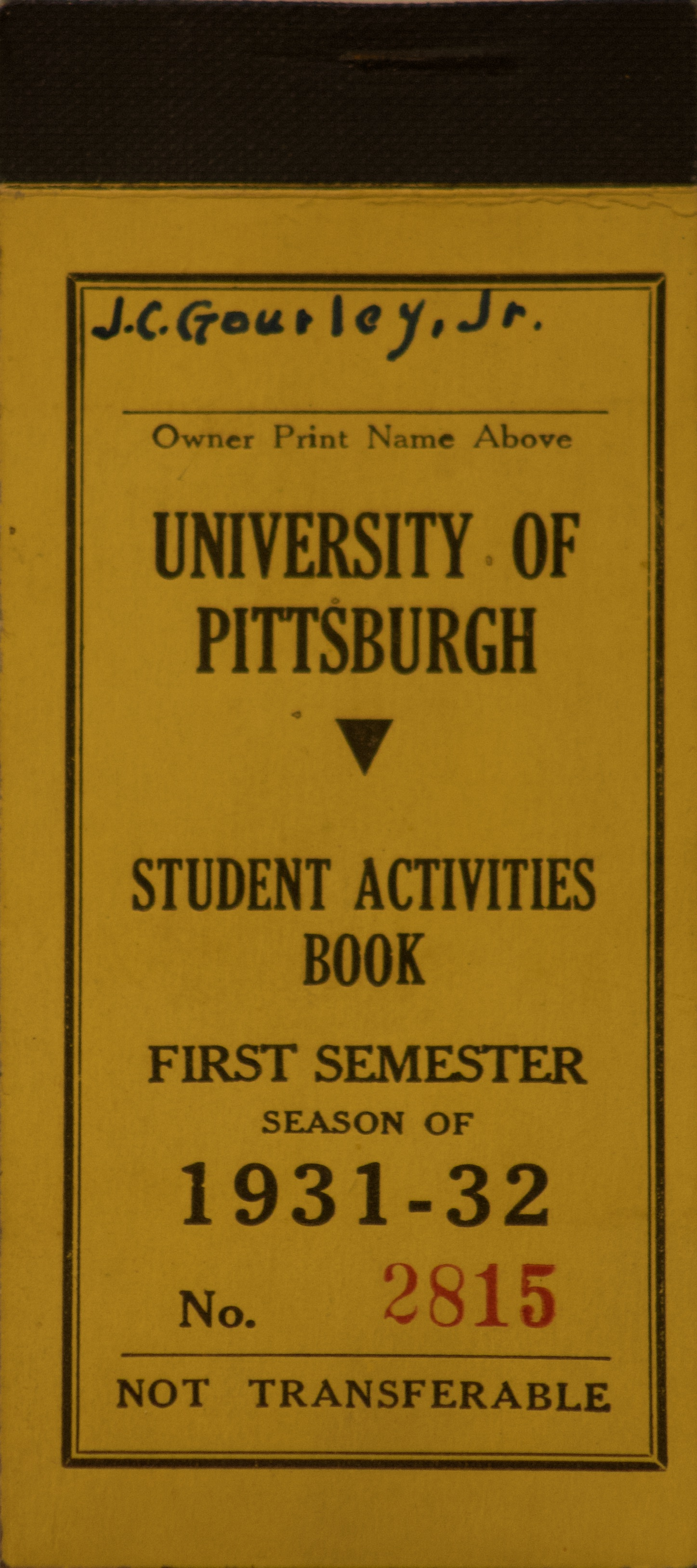
1931 Student Football Ticket Book

On December 15, at a private team banquet, coach Sutherland named end Edward Hirshberg captain for the 1931 Pitt football season.

At the February 3rd Athletic Council meeting, the board discussed three measures to de-emphasize football in collegiate life. 1) Fall football practice would not start until September 7, two weeks prior to the school's registration date. 2) The spring practice was left to the discretion of coach Sutherland. However, the practice could not interfere with classes or hinder participation in a spring sport. 3) An athlete could be suspended anytime during a season for failure to maintain scholastic progress.

The Athletic Council also appointed Bernard Windt varsity football manager for the 1931 season. He was enrolled in the College, class of 1932. Bernard was an apprentice manager in 1928, an assistant manager in 1929 and was the freshman team manager for the 1930 season.

Ninety Panthers started spring practice on March 23. "This number included almost thirty from last year's squad, twenty from last year's freshman team and about forty new men." After four weeks of drills and scrimmage, Coach Sutherland was satisfied: "I am greatly pleased with the spring practice. The players showed a marked improvement in form, ability and condition. The spirit of those participating was excellent throughout, and this aided the coaches a great deal." The players who came out for the first time and stayed with the squad the entire time were invited to fall camp.

On August 8, the Athletic Council hired former quarterback Eddie Baker and former end Eddie Schultz to assist coach Sutherland with the football team. Baker was in his final year of Dental School and Schultz was enrolled in Law School.

Starting center Ralph Daugherty passed summer school and was reinstated on the roster in time for preseason camp.

On September 7, fifty varsity aspirants started the two weeks of two-a-day practices at Camp Hamilton under the direction of “9 coaches, 12 managers, 3 cooks, 1 physician, 1 trainer, 1 property man and 1 dog.” Coach Sutherland had the task of finding a capable quarterback. Sophomore Bob Hogan earned the job and Rocco Cutri and Zola Alpert were his back-ups. Hogan was also the punter. After a week of camp The Pitt Weekly reported: "The schedule is rigorous, but the team is fit and ready."

== Coaching staff ==
1931 Pittsburgh Panthers football staff
Coaching staff: John B. "Jock" Sutherland – Head coach; Andy Gustafson – assistant backfield coach; Joe Donchess – assistant line coach; Ray Montgomery – assistant line coach; Bill Kern – assistant line coach; Edward Baker – assistant backfield coach; Eddie Schultz – assistant line coach; Ulhardt Hangartner – Assistant coach - scout; Roscoe “Skip” Gougler – Freshman coach	Support staff: Bernard Windt– student football manager; Dr. H. A. R. Shanor – team physician; George Moore – team trainer; Percy S. Browne – custodian of equipment; W. D. Harrison - director of athletics; James Hagan – assistant director of athletics; Frank Carver – Publicity Director

== Roster ==
1931 Pittsburgh Panthers football roster
Player	Position	Games	Height	Weight	Class	Prep School	Hometown
Edward Hirschberg*	end	8	5' 11"	173	1932	McKeesport H. S.	East McKeesport, PA
Jesse Quatse*	tackle	8	5' 10"	195	1933	Greensburg H. S.	Greensburg, PA
Walter Milligan*	guard	8	5' 10"	168	1933	Kiski School	McKees Rocks, PA
Ralph Daugherty*	center	8	5' 11"	174	1932	Kiski School	Freeport, PA
Hart Morris*	guard	8	5' 10"	175	1932	Bellaire H. S.	Bellaire, OH
James MacMurdo*	tackle	8	6' 1"	189	1932	Ellwood City H. S.	Ellwood City, PA
Paul Collins*	end	7	6' 1"	178	1932	Central H. S.	Sioux City, IA
Rocco Cutri*	quarterback	9	6'	170	1933	Erie Academy	Erie, PA
Warren Heller*	halfback	8	5' 10"	155	1933	Steelton H. S.	Steelton, PA
Paul Reider*	halfback	7	5' 9"	150	1933	Bellefonte Academy	New Castle. PA
James Clark*	fullback	8	5' 9"	162	1932	Greensburg H.S.	Greensburg, PA
Theodore Dailey*	end	9	5' 10"	155	1933	Phillipsburg H. S.	Phillipsburg, NJ
John Meredith*	tackle	9	6'	180	1934	Bellefonte Academy	Fairmont, WV
Francis Seigel*	guard	8	5' 10"	173	1933	Central H. S.	Sioux City, IA
Joseph Tormey*	center	8	5' 11"	180	1933	Erie Academy	Erie, PA
Tarciscio Onder*	guard	9	5' 11"	197	1934	Jeannette H. S.	Jeannette, PA
John Valenti	tackle	3	6' 2"	230	1934	Pierce School (Phila.)	Media, PA
Joe Skladany*	end	8	5' 8"	184	1934	Larksville H. S.	Larksville, PA
Robert Hogan*	quarterback	8	5' 10"	180	1934	Meadville H. S.	Meadville, PA
James Simms	halfback	7	5' 10"	165	1934	Kiski School	Monongahela, PA
Mike Sebastian*	halfback	9	5' 10"	167	1934	Sharon H. S.	Sharon, Pa.
John Luch*	fullback	8	5' 10"	190	1933	Warwood H. S.	Wheeling, WV
Robert Timmons	end	7	6'	168	1934	Allegheny H. S.	Pittsburgh, PA
John Love*	tackle	9	6' 1"	196	1934	Jeannette H. S.	Jeannette, PA
George Schindehutte	guard	3	5' 9"	170	1933	McKees Rocks H. S.	McKees Rocks, PA
Robert Morris*	center	7	6'	179	1932	Bellaire H. S.	Bellaire, OH
Art Craft	end	2	6'	170	1934	New Castle H. S.	New Castle, PA
Joe Tommins	end	3	5' 10"	169	1932	Farrell H. S.	Farrell, PA
Charles Hartwig	guard	1	5' 11"	170	1934	Warwood H. S.	Wheeling, WV
Melvin Brown	halfback	7	5' 9"	160	1933	Central H. S.	Pittsburgh, PA
Paul Cuba	guard	3	5' 11"	180	1933	New Castle H. S.	New Castle, PA
Herman Yentch	guard	4	5' 11"	175	1932	Perkiomen Prep	Harrisburg, PA
Zola Alpert	quarterback	7	5' 10"	155	1933	Culver Military Academy	Pittsburgh, PA
Ray Anderson	tackle	3	6' 1"	180	1933	Coraopolis H. S.	Coraopolis, PA
Arthur Sekay	halfback	2	5' 9"	155	1933	Schenley H. S.	Pittsburgh, PA
Howard Gelini	quarterback	4	5' 10"	170	1934	Weirton H. S.	Weirton, WV
Howard O'Dell	halfback	3	5' 9"	160	1934	Central H. S.	Sioux City, IA
William Hasson	fullback	5	5' 7"	170	1934	South H. S.	Pittsburgh, PA
R. K. Smith	guard	2	6'	175	1934	Staunton	Jeannette, PA
Frank Tiernan	tackle	1	6'	185	1934	Sewickley H. S.	Sewickley, PA
Dick Matesic	halfback	7	5' 11"	176	1934	Bellefonte Academy	Wheeling, WV
Eric Heller	halfback	2	5' 9"	167	1934	Mt. Lebanon H. S.	Mt. Lebanon, PA
Robert Harder	guard	1	5' 10"	190	1934	Peabody H. S.	Pittsburgh, PA
Jack Stricker	halfback	2	5' 11"	165	1934	South Hills H. S.	Pittsburgh, PA
Harold Roth	halfback	2	5' 9"	170	1934	Dennison H. S.	Dennison, OH
Ben Dello	halfback	1	5' 8"	164	1934	Johnstown H. S.	Johnstown, PA
John McCurdy	halfback	1	5' 10"	160	1934		Oakmont, PA
Bernard Windt*	student manager				1932	Peabody H. S.	Pittsburgh, PA
* Letterman

== Game summaries ==
=== Miami (OH) ===
Week 1: Miami (OH) at Pitt

Team	1	2	3	4	Total
Miami (OH)(0-0)	0	0	0	0	0
• Pitt (0-0)	24	12	6	19	61

- Date: September 26, 1931
- Location: Pitt Stadium
  Pittsburgh, PA
- Game start: 2:00 p.m.
- Game attendance: 12,000
- Game weather: fair and cool
- Referee: Earle Cavanaugh (Pittsburgh)

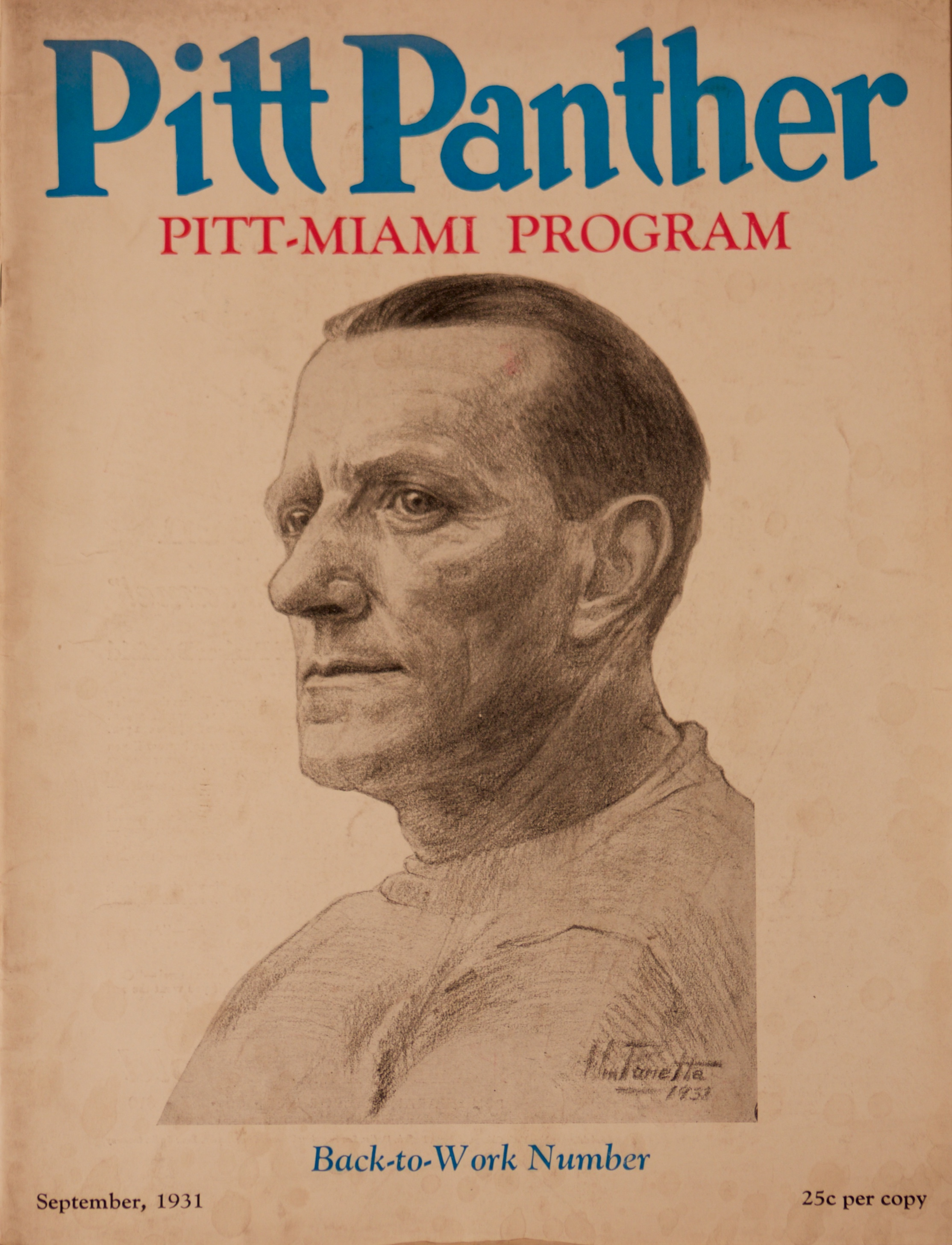
Program for September 26, 1931 Pitt vs. Miami (Ohio) game

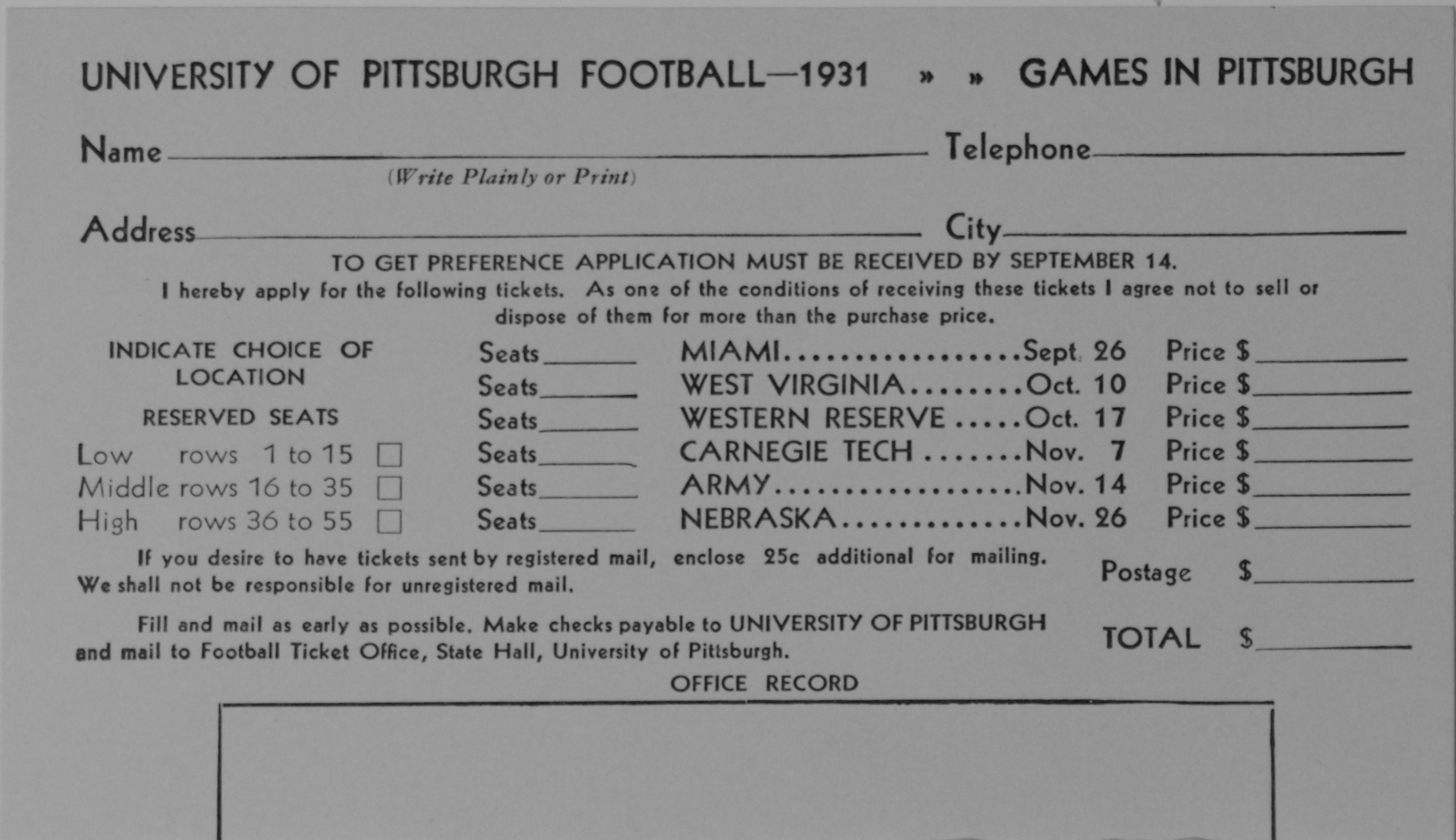
1931 season ticket application

The Panthers inaugurated their 1931 football season against the Miami (OH) Redskins at Pitt Stadium on September 26. Chester Pittser was in his eighth year as head coach of Miami (OH). Les Biederman of The Pittsburgh Press reported: "...the Ohioans, while not hoping for a victory, expect to give the Panthers a rough and ready battle, with Wilbur Cartwright, an ace runner and passer, in the major role." In 1930, Redskin halfback Wilbur Cartwright gained his notoriety by rushing for 1,168 yards.

Coach Sutherland spoke with The Pitt Weekly: "I am just as anxious as you are to find out just what kind of team we have this year, but we won't be able to tell until we have been in a game. We have reserves, but experience will probably clinch the doubtful positions. The team this year isn't the best that we've had. And the schedule is tough too."

The Pitt Weekly noted: "One hundred fifteen musicians will march in full military dress, under the leadership of student director James F. Reed, Col. '32, at Saturday's game in Pitt Stadium, according to an announcement by Manager William Young, Col. '33. Drum Major Robert Hogue will lead the drill."

Paul Reider took the opening kick-off 95 yards for a touchdown and the Panthers offense did not stop until they had amassed 61 points to the Ohioans' 0. Pitt scored 10 touchdowns. Warren Heller led the way with four. Paul Reider scored twice. Mike Sebastian, Dick Matesic, Melvin Brown and Eric Heller each added one to the total. Pitt's only problem was converting extra points - Paul Reider missed 6; Zora Alpert and William Hasson each missed one; Rocco Cutri was successful on one of his two attempts. Otherwise, the Panther offense dominated with 30 first downs, 499 yards rushing and 113 yards gained through the air. The Panther defense was strong also, as Miami only managed to earn three first downs and gain 91 total yards. The Redskins finished the season with a 4–5 record. In 1949, Pitt and Miami (OH) would meet for the second and last time on the gridiron.

The Pitt starting lineup for the game against Miami (OH) was Edward Hirschberg (left end), Jesse Quatse (left tackle), Walter Milligan (left guard), Ralph Daugherty (center), Hart Morris (right guard), James MacMurdo (right tackle), Paul Collins (right end), Bob Hogan (quarterback), Warren Heller (left halfback), Paul Reider (right halfback) and James Clark (fullback). Substitutes appearing in the game for Pitt were Theodore Dailey, Arthur Timmons, Joe Tommins, John Meredith, John Love, Frank Tiernan, Francis Seigel, George Schindehutte, R. K. Smith, Joe Tormey, Richard Morris, Tarciscio Onder, Charles Hartwig, Robert Halder, John Valenti, Paul Cuba, Ray Anderson, Joseph Skladany, Arthur Craft, Rocco Cutri, Zora Alpert, Howard Gelini, James Simms, Melvin Brown, Howard O'Dell, Eric Heller, Harold Roth, John McCurdy, Mike Sebastian, Arthur Sekay, Dick Matesic, Jack Schricker, Ben Dello, John Luch and William Hasson.

=== At Iowa ===
Week 2: Pitt at Iowa

Team	1	2	3	4	Total
• Pitt (1-0)	6	7	7	0	20
Iowa (0-0)	0	0	0	0	0

- Date: October 3, 1931
- Location: Iowa Stadium
  Iowa City, IA
- Game start: 2:30 p.m.
- Game attendance: 12,000
- Game weather: cloudy and warm
- Referee: Fred Gardner (Cornell)

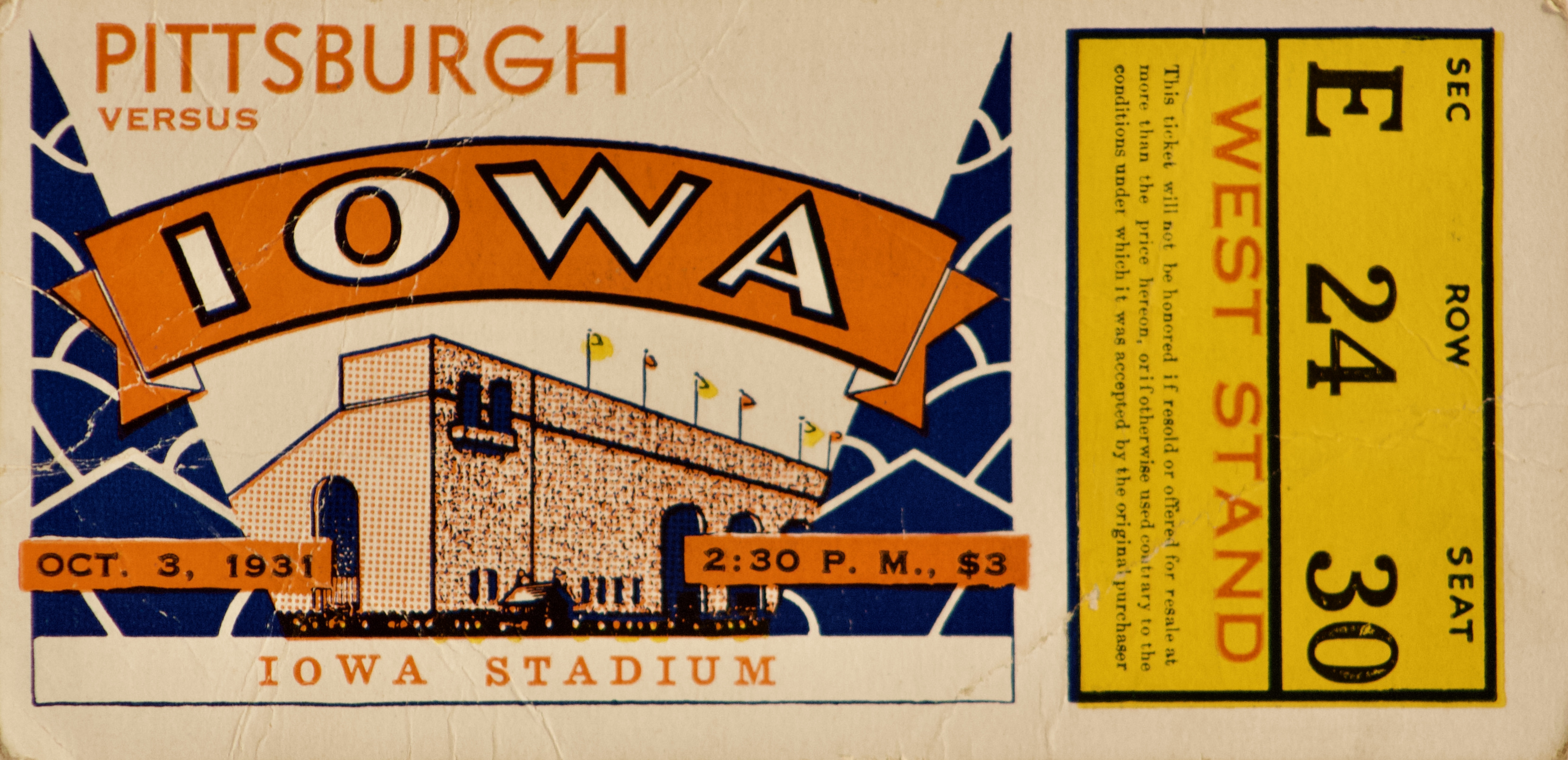
Ticket Stub for October 3, 1931 Pitt vs. Iowa game

The first road game of the season was to Iowa City, Iowa to take on Burton Ingwersen's Iowa Hawkeyes of the Big Ten. Pitt and Iowa had met three times on the basketball court (1928, 1929, 1930), but this was the first meeting on the gridiron. Pitt Chancellor John G. Bowman was the former President of the University of Iowa, and Pitt Athletic Director, W. Don Harrison, was a graduate of the University.

Iowa was suspended from the Big Ten on May 25, 1929, for a slush fund recruiting scandal. In 1930 they were readmitted, allowed to play one conference game, and ended the season with a 4–4–1 record. This was Iowa's opening game. The Iowa City Press-Citizen noted: "Seven men who were slated for first string positions are in the hospital or on the injured list forcing Coach Burt Ingwersen to depend upon second string linemen to withstand the Golden Panthers' famed attack. That job, stopping the east's most powerful running club, would be a task for any first string line let alone a reserve lineup."

On the night of September 30, thirty-three Panthers boarded the train headed west and arrived in Chicago the next morning. A two-hour workout session was held on Stagg Field. The team enjoyed a visit to the theater after dinner, and then they reboarded the train and arrived the following morning in Davenport, Iowa. The Panthers held a secret drill in Davenport's Municipal Stadium. The team was in great condition in spite of the long journey. After the team converted only one of ten placements in the Miami game, Coach Sutherland designated tackle James MacMurdo the placement kicker.

The Panthers ruined Iowa's full standing in the Big Ten return by shutting out the Hawkeyes 20 to 0. The score was not indicative of how dominating the Panthers performed - Pitt earned 18 first downs to Iowa's five; Pitt gained 377 yards rushing to Iowa's 58; and Pitt gained 39 yards through the air to Iowa's 16. Fullback James Clark led the way with 151 yards on 17 carries. The Iowa defense deserved respect because four times Pitt had the ball deep in Iowa territory and failed to score. Randall Hickman intercepted a Warren Heller pass to stop a drive in the first quarter. The other three times the Panthers lost the ball on downs. Paul Reider scored two touchdowns and Clark added one, while MacMurdo was good on two of three placements to total 20 points.

The Hawkeyes finished the season with a 1–6–1 record.

The Pitt starting lineup for the game against Iowa was Edward Hirshberg (left end), Jesse Quatse (left tackle), Walter Milligan (left guard), Ralph Daugherty (center), Hart Morris (right guard), James MacMurdo (right tackle), Paul Collins (right end), Bob Hogan (quarterback), Warren Heller (left halfback), Paul Reider (right halfback) and James Clark (fullback). Substitutes appearing in the game for Pitt were Melvin Brown, Mike Sebastian, Joseph Tormey, John Meredith, Francis Siegel, Tarciscio Onder, John Luch, Rocco Cutri, Theodore Dailey, Joseph Skladany, John Love, Arthur Timmons, Dick Matesic, Robert Morris, James Simms, Howard O'Dell and Zora Alpert.

Scoring summary

Quarter	Time	Drive			Team	Scoring information	Score	
Quarter	Time	Plays	Yards	TOP	Team	Scoring information	Pittsburgh	Iowa
1		8	69		Pittsburgh	Paul Reider 1-yard touchdown run, James MacMurdo kick no good	6	0
2		7	35		Pittsburgh	Paul Reider 7-yard touchdown run, James MacMurdo kick good	13	0
3		1	35		Pittsburgh	James Clark 1-yard touchdown run, James MacMurdo kick good	20	0
"TOP" = time of possession. For other American football terms, see Glossary of American football.							20	0

=== West Virginia ===
Week 3: West Virginia at Pitt

Team	1	2	3	4	Total
West Virginia	0	0	0	0	0
• Pitt	0	6	7	21	34

- Date: October 10, 1931
- Location: Pitt Stadium
  Pittsburgh, PA
- Game start: 2:00 p.m.
- Game attendance: 18,000-20,000
- Game weather: "perfect football weather"
- Referee: J. E. Keegan (Pittsfield, MA)

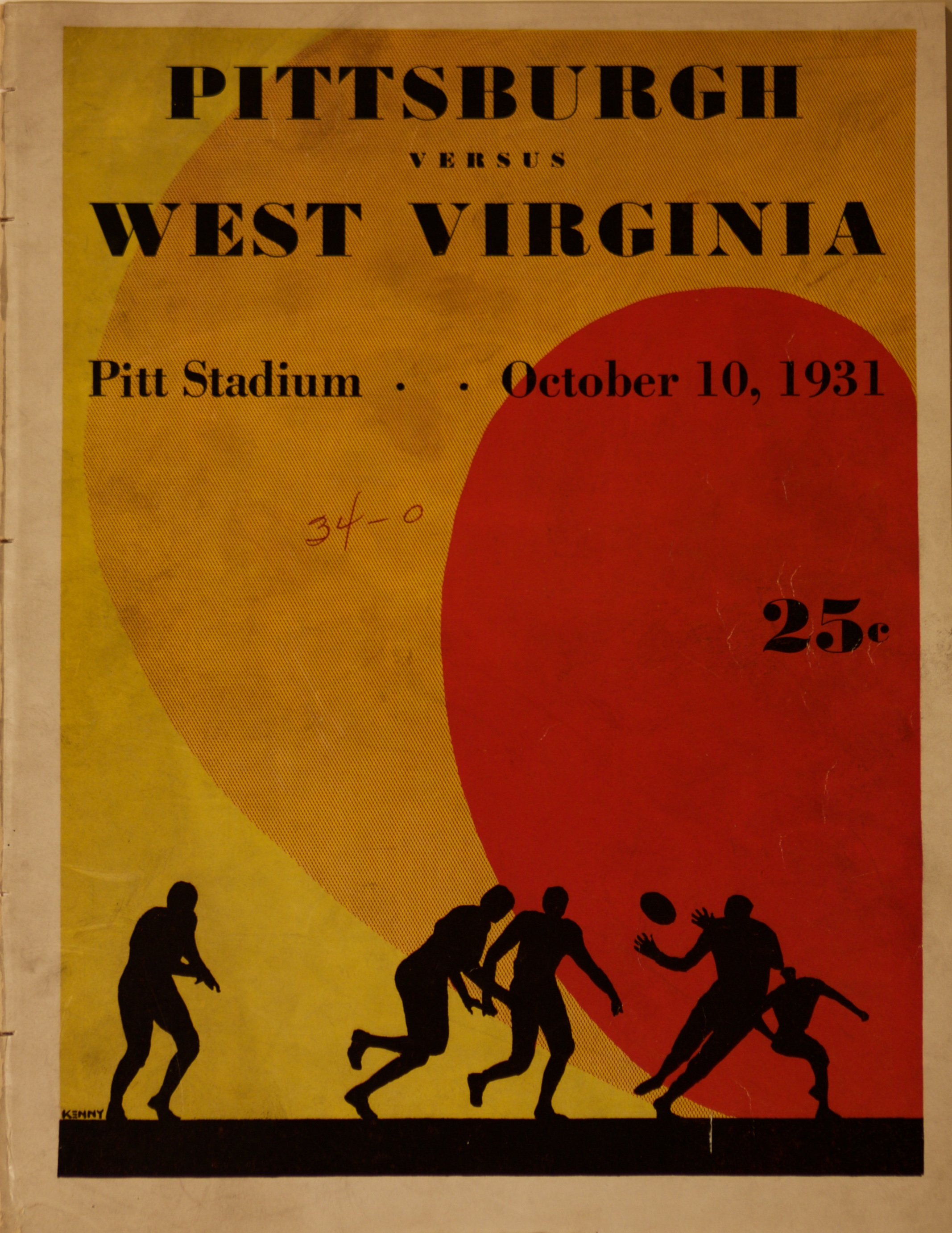
Program for October 10, 1931 Pitt vs. West Virginia game

After hosting the game in Morgantown in 1930, the Greasy Neale-led Mountaineers returned to Pittsburgh for the 27th edition of the "Backyard Brawl". The Mountaineers arrived with a 1–1 record. They beat the Duquesne Dukes 14–7 in their home opener and lost to the Fordham Rams 20–7 at the Polo Grounds. Three Mountaineers were missing from the starting lineup due to injuries. Captain John Doyle was replaced by Harry Marker at halfback, William Karr replaced Earl Sprouse at end and Isaac Lewis replaced Lawrence Beall at tackle. The Pitt Weekly was confident: "About all that West Virginia can hope to do against the Panthers tomorrow is hold them to a low score, and its prospects for doing so are not very bright."

The Panthers were healthy and Coach Sutherland used the same starting lineup that played in the Iowa game except for John Luch at fullback in place of James Clark.

In front of 20,000 fans in Pitt Stadium, the strong Panther offense scored 34 points, and their stiff defense shut out West Virginia, as Pitt earned its third win of the season. The first quarter was scoreless, even though the Panther offense penetrated the Mountaineer 5-yard line before losing the ball on downs. Early in the second period the Panthers gained possession on their own 47-yard line. On first down Warren Heller completed a 23 yard pass to Paul Reider who raced the final 30 yards to the end zone. James MacMurdo missed the extra point. Pitt led at halftime 6–0. Heller capped an 80 yard third quarter drive with a 2 yard plunge for the Panthers' second touchdown. MacMurdo added the extra point and Pitt led 13 to 0 at the end of three periods. The offense produced three scores in the final stanza. John Luch, Mike Sebastian and Theodore Daily each scored a touchdown. MacMurdo added two placements and Rocco Cutri booted the last one to make the final score, Pitt 34 to West Virginia 0.

At halftime the West Virginia band performed longer than their allotted time. The Pitt band was only one-third of the way through their routine when the teams were ready to start the second half. Coach Sutherland had to convince the drum major to lead the band off the field so the Panthers would not be penalized.

The Pitt starting lineup for the game against West Virginia was Edward Hirshberg (left end), Jesse Quatse (left tackle), Walter Milligan (left guard), Ralph Daugherty (center), Hart Morris (right guard), James MacMurdo (right tackle), Paul Collins (right end), Bob Hogan (quarterback), Warren Heller (left halfback), Paul Reider (right halfback) and John Luch (fullback). Substitutes appearing in the game for Pitt were Theodore Dailey, John Meredith, Francis Seigel, Joseph Tormey, Robert Morris, Tarciscio Onder, Herman Yentch, John Love, Joseph Skladany, Arthur Timmons, Rocco Cutri, Zora Alpert, James Simms, Melvin Brown, Mike Sebastian, Dick Matesic, James Clark, Howard Gelini and William Hasson.

Scoring summary

Quarter	Time	Drive			Team	Scoring information	Score	
Quarter	Time	Plays	Yards	TOP	Team	Scoring information	Pittsburgh	Iowa
2		1	53		Pittsburgh	Paul Reider 53-yard touchdown reception from Warren Heller, James MacMurdo kick no good	0	6
3		14	80		Pittsburgh	Heller 2-yard touchdown run, James MacMurdo kick good	0	13
4					Pittsburgh	Luch 2-yard touchdown run, MacMurdo kick good	0	20
4		2	44		Pittsburgh	Mike Sebastian 10-yard touchdown run, MacMurdo kick good	0	27
4			31		Pittsburgh	Theodore Dailey 20-yard touchdown reception from Sebastian, MacMurdo kick good	0	34
"TOP" = time of possession. For other American football terms, see Glossary of American football.							0	34

=== Western Reserve ===
Week 4: Western Reserve at Pitt

Team	1	2	3	4	Total
Western Reserve	0	0	0	0	0
• Pitt	13	0	13	6	32

- Date: October 17, 1931
- Location: Pitt Stadium
  Pittsburgh, PA
- Game start: 2:00 p.m.
- Game attendance: 5,000
- Game weather: rain
- Referee: Cal Bolster (Pittsburgh)

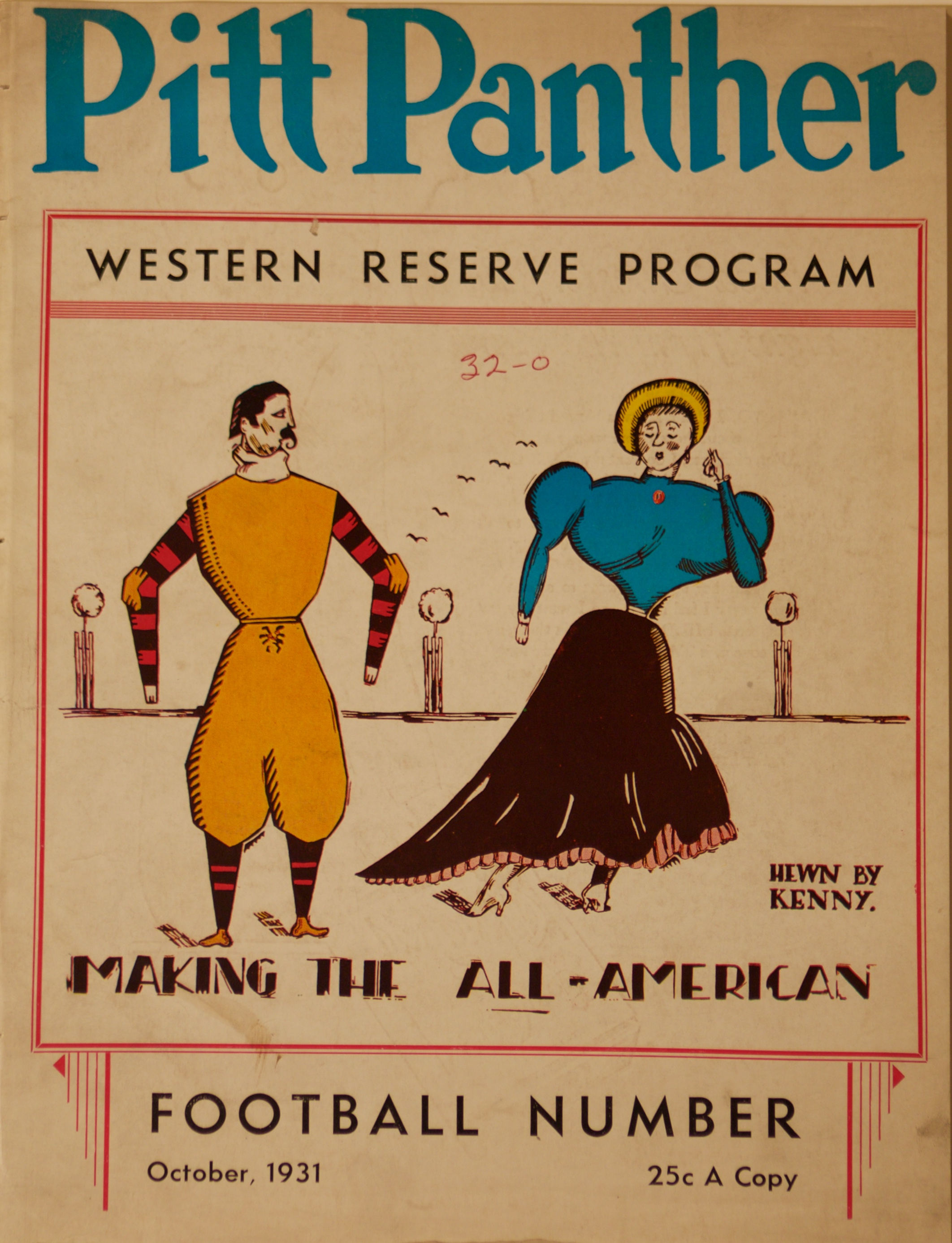
Program for October 17, 1931 Pitt vs. Western Reserve game

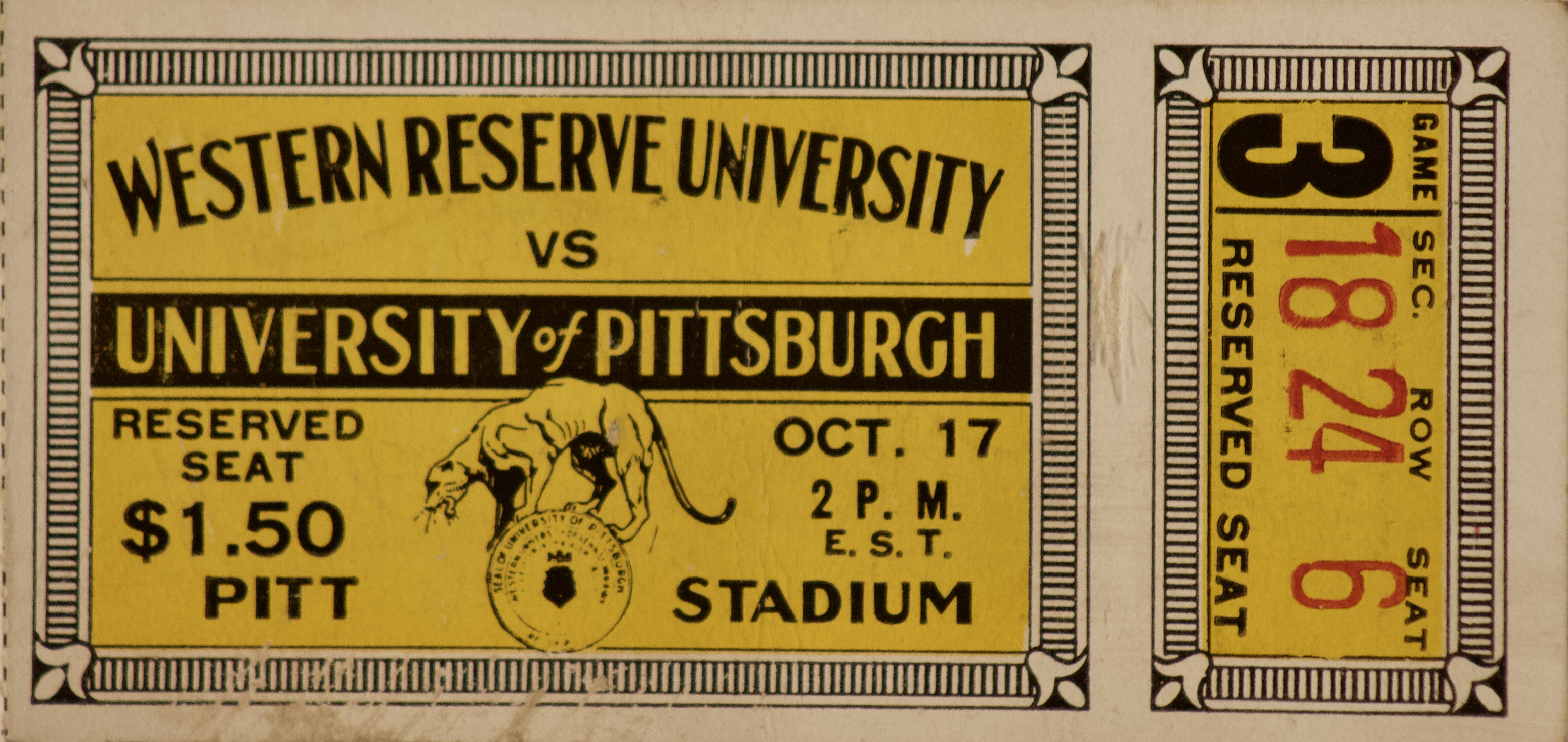
Ticket stub for October 17, 1931 Western Reserve game

Last season in Cleveland, Pitt clobbered Western Reserve 52–0. On October 17, first-year coach Tom Keady and his Western Reserve Red Cats came to Pitt Stadium for the rematch. The Red Cats were 0–1–1 in the young season, with a loss to Purdue and a tie with Bowling Green. The Pittsburgh Sun-Telegraph reported: "Karl Davis and Tom Keady, Western Reserve football chiefs, were not dismayed at the prospect that their team would be outclassed and decisively beaten in the game with Pitt...Coach Keady says..his main object is to develop material for the future, and he is confident that his present sophomores, combined with the fine freshman material at hand, soon will put Reserve on the map from a football viewpoint."

Coach Sutherland spent the week preparing his first string for the Notre Dame game, while prepping his second and third teams to take on the Red Cats.

Boys and girls under 16 years old could attend the game for 10 cents thanks to an arrangement between the Pittsburgh Sun-Telegraph and the Stadium management.

The coaches' strategy worked for both squads as Pitt defeated the Red Cats 32 to 0 in the rain. The Panthers first team was able to rest and Western Reserve gave up 20 less points than it had the previous year. Fullback John Luch scored three touchdowns and Mike Sebastian and James Simms added one each. The Panthers were only successful on 2 of 5 extra point attempts, but otherwise dominated on both sides of the ball. Pitt gained 519 total yards and earned 19 first downs. Western gained 51 total yards and earned 1 first down. The Panthers were assessed 75 yards on 10 penalties.

The Pitt starting lineup for the game against Western Reserve was Theodore Dailey (left end), John Meredith (left tackle), Francis Seigel (left guard), Robert Morris (center), Tarciscio Onder (right guard), John Love (right tackle), Joseph Skladany (right end), Rocco Cutri (quarterback), James Simms (left halfback), Mike Sebastian (right halfback) and John Luch (fullback). Substitutes appearing in the game for Pitt were Edward Hirshberg, Joseph Timmins, Jesse Quatse, Paul Cuba, Walter Milligan, John Valenti, Ralph Daugherty, Herman Yentch, Hart Morris, George Schindehutte, R. K. Smith, James MacMurdo, Ray Anderson, Arthur Timmons, Arthur Craft, Bob Hogan, Zora Alpert, Melvin Brown, Warren Heller, Howard O'Dell, Eric Heller, Dick Matesic, Arthur Sekay, Harold Roth, Howard Gelini, William Hasson and Jack Schricker.

Scoring summary

Quarter	Time	Drive			Team	Scoring information	Score	
Quarter	Time	Plays	Yards	TOP	Team	Scoring information	Western Reserve	Pittsburgh
1		2	41		Pittsburgh	Mike Sebastian 35-yard touchdown run, Rocco Cutri kick good	0	7
1		8	31		Pittsburgh	John Luch 1-yard touchdown run, Cutri kick no good	0	13
3		6	48		Pittsburgh	Luch 4-yard touchdown run, Cutri kick no good	0	19
3		1	64		Pittsburgh	James Simms 64-yard touchdown run, Cutri kick good	0	26
4		7	63		Pittsburgh	Luch 4-yard touchdown run, James MacMurdo kick no good	0	32
"TOP" = time of possession. For other American football terms, see Glossary of American football.							0	32

=== At Notre Dame ===
Week 5: Pitt at Notre Dame

Team	1	2	3	4	Total
Pitt	0	6	0	6	12
• Notre Dame	7	6	6	6	25

- Date: October 24, 1931
- Location: Notre Dame Stadium
  Notre Dame, IN
- Game start: 2:00 p.m.
- Game attendance: 42,000
- Referee: W. T. Halloran (Ohio)

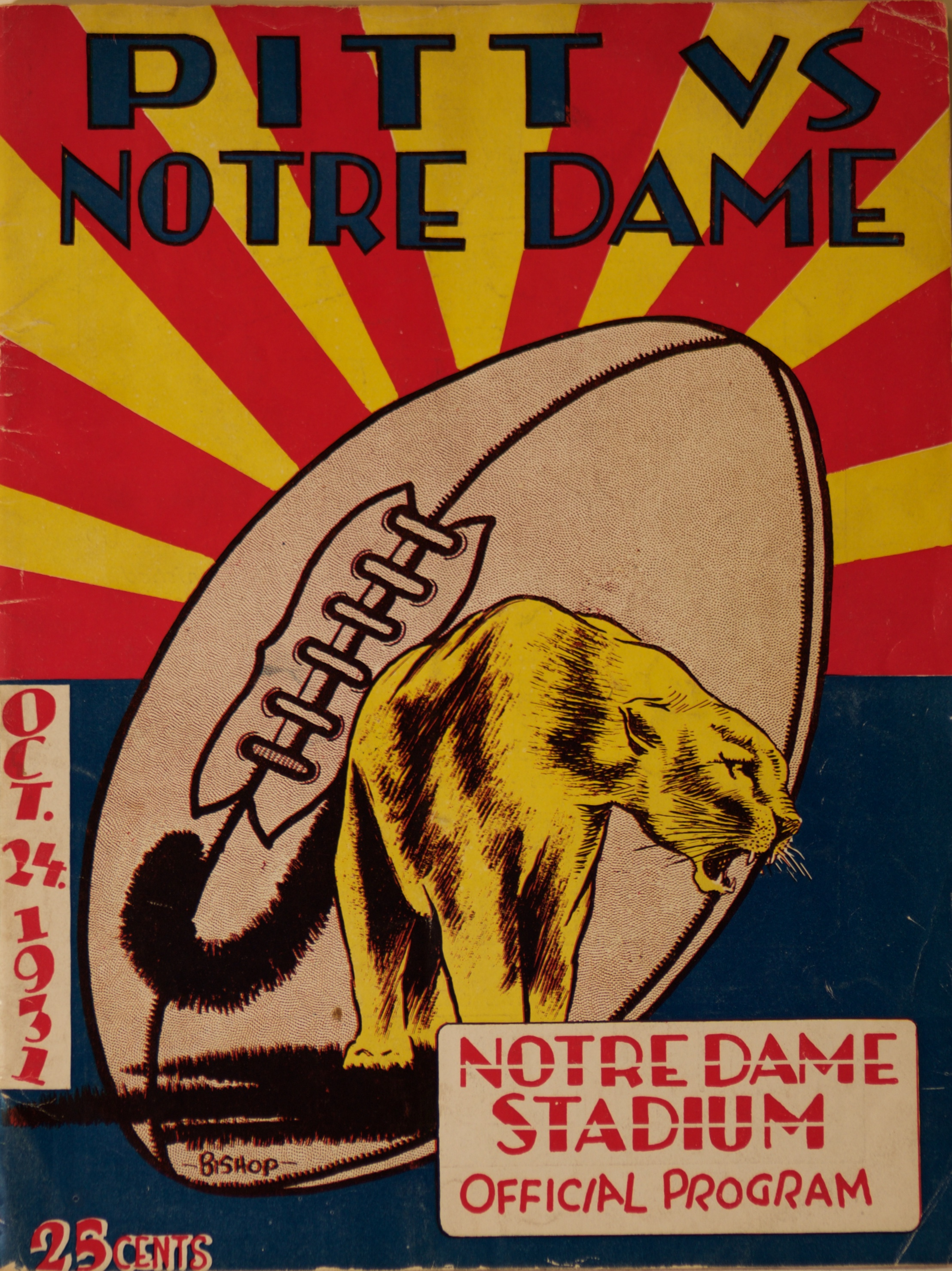
Program for October 24, 1931 Pitt vs. Notre Dame game

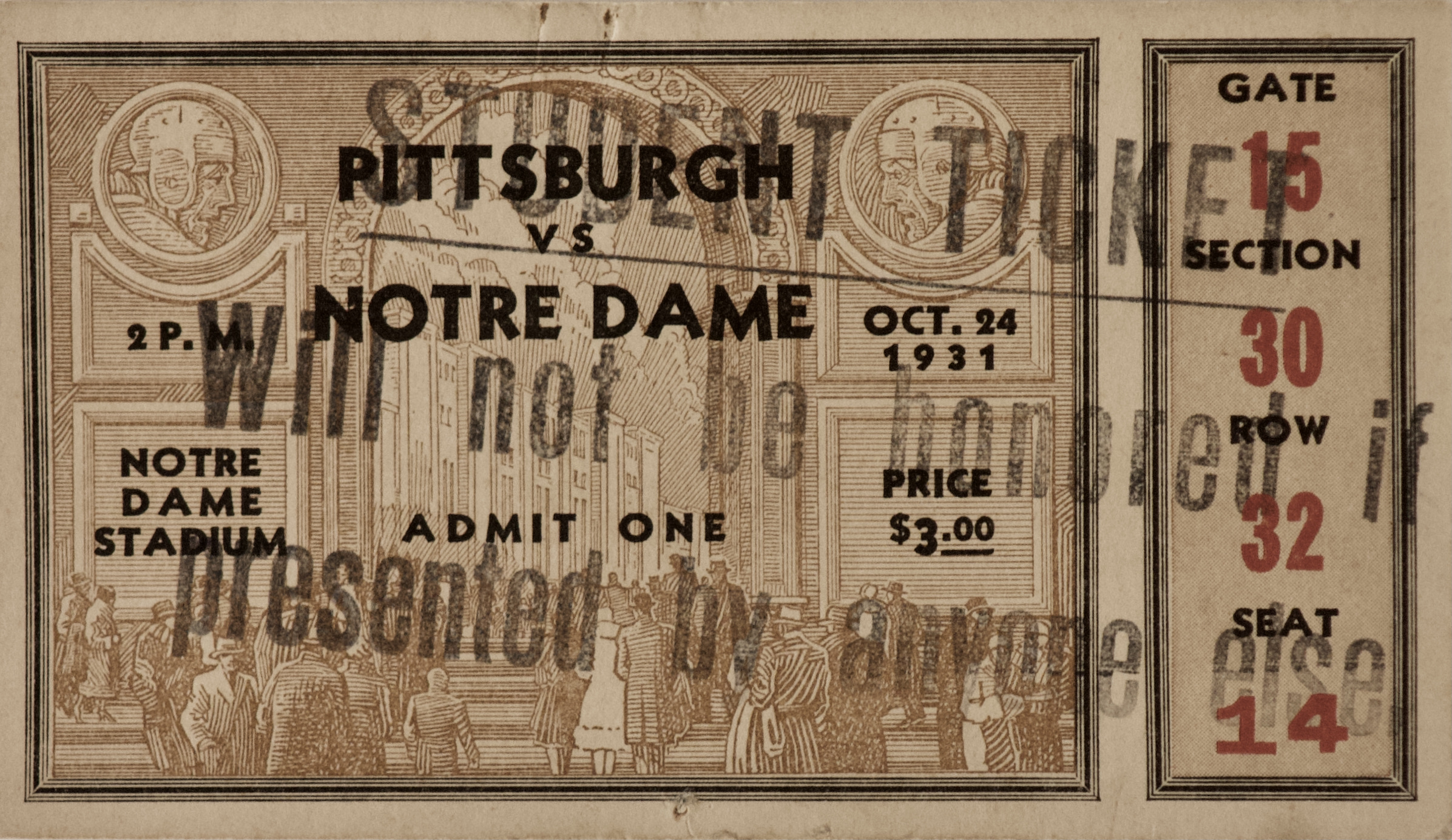
Ticket stub for October 24, 1931 game vs. Notre Dame

On October 24 in South Bend, IN, the unbeaten and unscored upon Pitt Panthers second road game was against the unbeaten and unscored upon Fighting Irish of Notre Dame. The game was somewhat bittersweet in that famed Notre Dame coach, Knute Rockne, tragically died in a plane crash on March 31. Hunk Anderson was named to succeed the legend. He had the Irish 2–0–1 for the season with victories over Indiana and Drake, and a scoreless tie with Northwestern. The Notre Dame lineup was stocked with All-American material. Halfback Marchmont Schwartz and center Tommy Yarr were consensus All-American picks. Tackle Joe Kurth and guard Frank Hoffman were also named on multiple teams.

Les Biederman of The Pittsburgh Press noted: "Jock Sutherland wants to win this game more than any other on the schedule and every trick he's ever mastered will be at the command of the Panthers Saturday." "One thing in Sutherland's favor is that no school has ever been able to hang up two successive victories over him." The Panthers were winless against the Irish in their four previous games with the series standing 0–3–1.

Thirty-three Panthers boarded the train for South Bend on Thursday night, arriving on Friday morning. "The Panthers left an hour ahead of the previous scheduled time, and for the first time in years a large delegation of Pitt fans and the Pitt band were at the Pennsylvania station to give them a sendoff." A bus transported the squad the final ten miles to their headquarters at the Four Flaggs Hotel in Niles, MI. After lunch, the Panthers worked out on the Notre Dame Stadium turf.

The Panthers performed well but succumbed 25–12 to the reigning National Champions in front of 42,000 fans. Offensively, Notre Dame gained 305 yards, earned 17 first downs and completed 6 of 14 passes for 92 yards. Defensively, the Irish held the Panthers to 106 yards, 6 first downs and 2 of 11 passing for 36 yards. In the first quarter, Marchmont Schwartz opened the scoring with an 18 yard pass reception from George Melinkovich. Emmett Murphy added the extra point Score: Notre Dame 7 to Pitt 0. The Panthers got on the scoreboard in the second period after an 11 play drive ended with a 2 yard touchdown run by Warren Heller. MacMurdo missed the placement. Score: Notre Dame 7 to Pitt 6. Late in the first half, Notre Dame capped a 55 yard drive with a 6 yard touchdown pass from Mike Koken to Paul Host. Halftime score: Notre Dame 13 to Pitt 6. Notre Dame added two more touchdowns before the Panther offense drove 56 yards on 8 plays in the fourth quarter. John Luch scored from the 1-yard line. Heller missed the placement . Final Score: Notre Dame 25 to Pitt 12.

The Pitt starting lineup for the game against Notre Dame was Edward Hirshberg (left end), Jesse Quatse (left tackle), Walter Milligan (left guard), Ralph Daugherty (center), Hart Morris (right guard), James MacMurdo (right tackle), Paul Collins (right end), Bob Hogan (quarterback), Warren Heller (left halfback), Paul Reider (right halfback) and John Luch (fullback). Substitutes appearing in the game for Pitt were Theodore Dailey, John Meredith, Francis Seigel, Joseph Tormey, Tarciscio Onder, John Love, Joseph Skladany, Rocco Cutri, Mike Sebastian and James Simms.

Scoring summary

Quarter	Time	Drive			Team	Scoring information	Score	
Quarter	Time	Plays	Yards	TOP	Team	Scoring information	Pittsburgh	Notre Dame
1		8	33		Notre Dame	George Melinkovich 15-yard touchdown reception from Marchmont Schwartz, Emmett Murphy kick good	0	7
2		11	39		Pittsburgh	Warren Heller 2-yard touchdown run, James MacMurdo kick no good	6	7
2		8	55		Notre Dame	Paul Host 6-yard touchdown reception from Mike Koken, Koken kick blocked	6	13
3		6	35		Notre Dame	Charles Jaskwich 14-yard touchdown reception from Schwartz, Jaskwich kick no good	6	19
4		7	37		Notre Dame	Melinkovich 1-yard touchdown run, Jaskwich kick no good	6	25
4		8	56		Pittsburgh	John Luch 1-yard touchdown run, Heller kick no good	12	25
"TOP" = time of possession. For other American football terms, see Glossary of American football.							12	25

=== At Penn State ===
Week 6: Pitt at Penn State

Team	1	2	3	4	Total
• Pitt	27	7	7	0	41
Penn State	0	0	6	0	6

- Date: October 31, 1931
- Location: New Beaver Field
  State College, PA
- Game start: 2:00 p.m.
- Game attendance: 10,000
- Game weather: cold
- Referee: E. C. Taggart

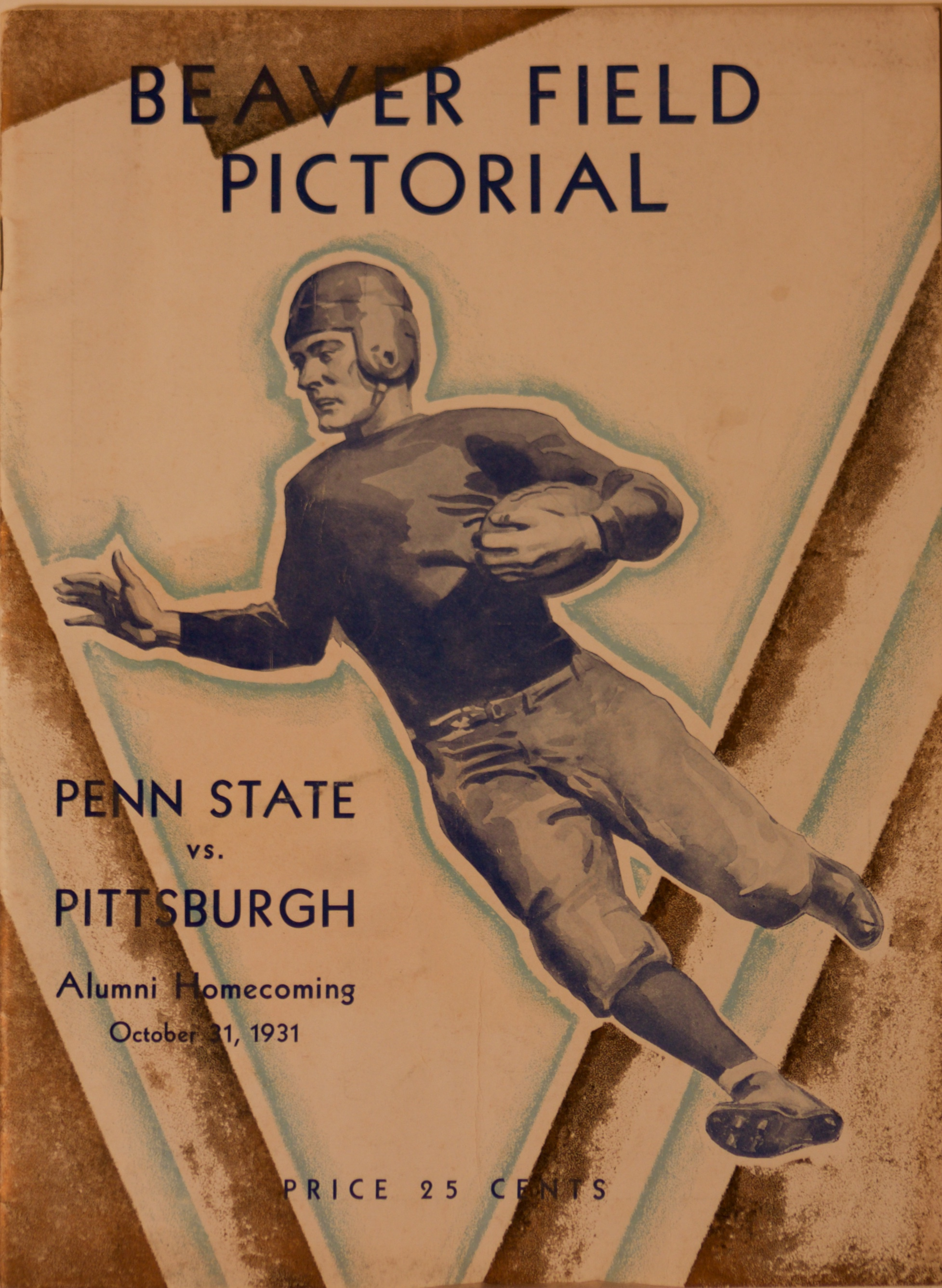
Program for October 31, 1931 Pitt vs. Penn State game

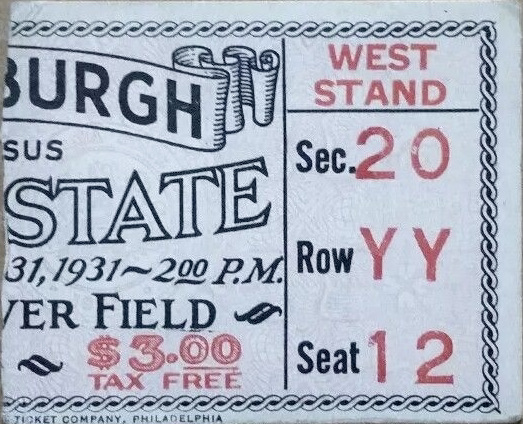
Ticket stub for October 31, 1931 game vs. Penn State

Since 1902, the Pitt and Penn State football game was played annually in Pittsburgh and, with the exception of 1902 and 1903, was played on Thanksgiving Day. When the contract expired in 1930 Pitt led the series 18–13–2. The Penn State officials no longer wanted to play the game on Thanksgiving and wanted to schedule some games in State College. The Nittany Lions got their wish and the October 31st game took place on New Beaver Field in State College.

The Lions under second year coach Bob Higgins were 1–4 on the season. Their only win came against Lebanon Valley (19–6). The Lions finished the season with a 2–8 record.

The Pittsburgh Press reported: "Jock Sutherland has just about decided to start his second team, and if the going gets too rough, will shoot in the varsity." Two starters, guard Hart Morris (broken hand) and halfback Paul Reider (severe leg injury), were injured in the Notre Dame game and unable to play.

The second and third string Pitt Panthers took out their frustrations from the Notre Dame game on the hapless Nittany Lions with a 41 to 6 drubbing. Pitt scored 27 points in the first quarter. Penn State halfback, Philip Moonves' two fumbles in the first five minutes both resulted in James Simms touchdowns and the rout was on. The Panther offense sustained a five-play, 60 yard drive culminating with a 47 yard run by James Clark for their third touchdown. Later in the quarter State fullback George Lasich's fumble led to William Hasson's 25 yard dash to the end zone. Rocco Cutri was good on 3 of 4 placements. Thanks to a Carl Wille fumble, Pitt had possession on the State 25-yard line at the start of the second quarter. Third string halfback Dick Matesic scored the touchdown on a 6 yard end run. Cutri was good with the extra point and Pitt led 34 to 0 at halftime. The Panthers managed one score in the third stanza on 60 yard pass interception by Matesic. Cutri added the extra point to close out the Panther scoring. Penn State drove 44 yards late in the quarter and scored on a 2 yard pass from Don Conn to William McMillan. "Pitt was unsatisfied with having yielded those six points, and added injury to insult by blocking the extra point."

The Pitt starting lineup for the game against Penn State was Theodore Dailey (left end), John Meredith (left tackle), Francis Seigel (left guard), Joseph Tormey (center), Tarcisio Onder (right guard), John Love (right tackle), Joseph Skladany (right end), Rocco Cutri (quarterback), James Simms (left halfback), Mike Sebastian (right halfback) and James Clark (fullback). Substitutes appearing in the game for Pitt were William Hasson, Robert Morris, Dick Matesic, Herman Yentch, Melvin Brown, George Schindehutte, Zora Alpert, Arthur Timmons, Paul Cuba, John Valenti and Howard Gelini.

Pitt and Penn State would not meet on the gridiron again until 1935.

Scoring summary

Quarter	Time	Drive			Team	Scoring information	Score	
Quarter	Time	Plays	Yards	TOP	Team	Scoring information	Pittsburgh	Penn State
1		4	15		Pittsburgh	James Simms 1-yard touchdown run, Rocco Cutri kick good	7	0
1		1	24		Pittsburgh	James Simms 24-yard touchdown run, Cutri kick no good	13	0
1		5	60		Pittsburgh	James Clark 47-yard touchdown run, Cutri kick good	20	0
1		4	37		Pittsburgh	William Hasson 25-yard touchdown run, Cutri kick good	27	0
2		9	25		Pittsburgh	Dick Matesic 6-yard touchdown run, Cutri kick good	34	0
3		1	60		Pittsburgh	Interception returned 60 yards for touchdown by Dick Matesic, Cutri kick good	41	0
3		8	44		Penn State	William McMillan 2-yard touchdown reception from Don Conn, kick no good (blocked)	41	6
"TOP" = time of possession. For other American football terms, see Glossary of American football.							41	6

=== Carnegie Tech ===
Week 7: Carnegie Tech at Pitt

Team	1	2	3	4	Total
Carnegie Tech	0	0	0	6	6
• Pitt	7	0	7	0	14

- Date: November 7, 1931
- Location: Pitt Stadium
  Pittsburgh, PA
- Game start: 2:00 p.m.
- Game attendance: 25,000
- Game weather: cold
- Referee: W. G. Crowell (Swarthmore)

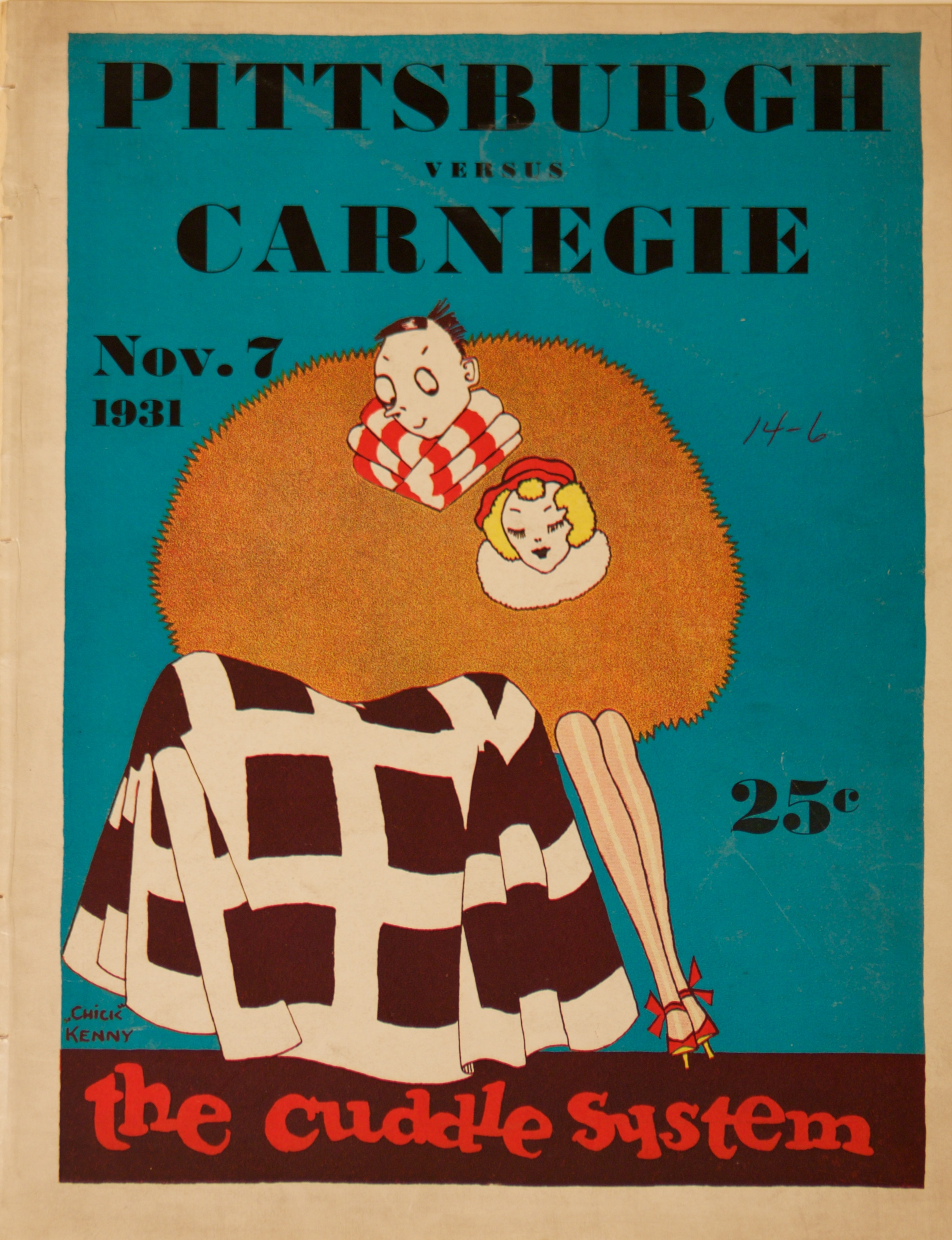
Program for November 7, 1931 Pitt vs. Carnegie Tech game

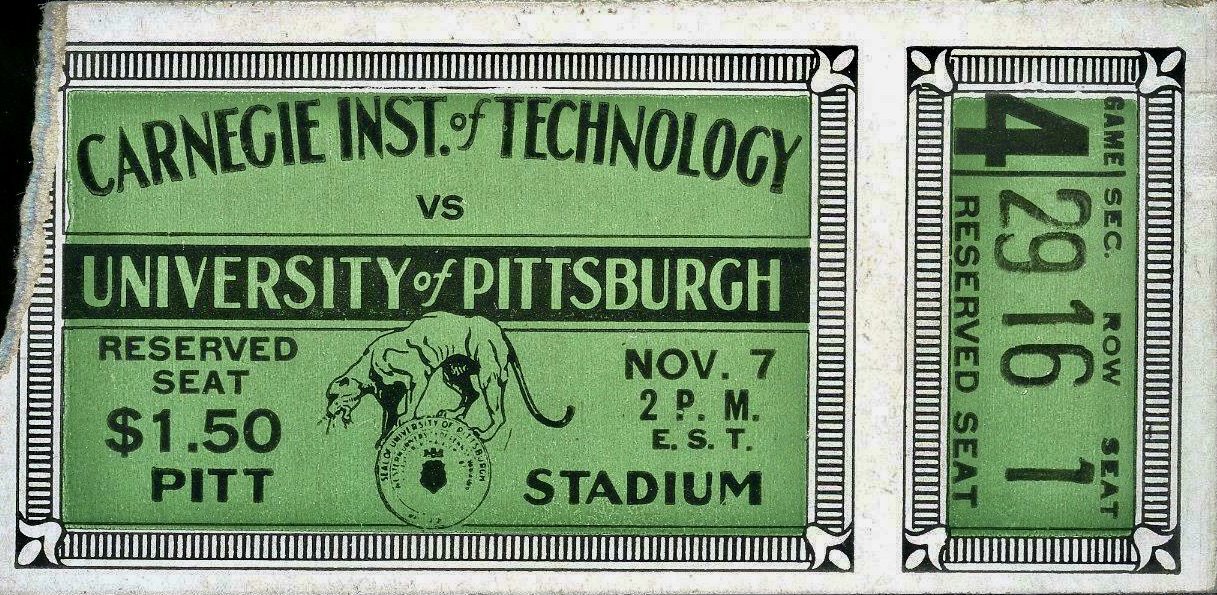
Ticket stub for November 7, 1931 game vs. Carnegie Tech

On November 7, the 18th annual battle for the "City Championship Trophy" took place at Pitt Stadium in front of 25,000 fans. Pitt led the series 13–4, but the Tartans were 4–4 over the previous eight years under coach Walter Steffen. Tech sported a 2–3 record, with losses to W & J, Purdue and Notre Dame. Even though the Tartans were missing three starters from their lineup due to injuries (fullback Jerry O'Toole, guard Clyde Heinzer and end Lib Lewis), "the sterling fight the Tartans put forth in battling Notre Dame has convinced their supporters that if effort and spirit can win the game today, the Skibos will come out on top."

The Pitt Weekly noted: "Past records mean little when these two schools meet as attested by Pitt's surprise 7 to 6 victory last year when the Tartans were two touchdowns pre-game favorites, and fans intending to attend tomorrow's game will probably see one of the hardest fought games on the local gridiron."

The Pitt students refrained from the downtown parade that blemished the 1930 city clash, and held a pep rally close to campus. Conversely, the Tech students repeated their after midnight bonfire antics and bottle throwing at the police and firemen. 115 Techies were carted off to jail and missed the game.

The Panthers prevailed 14 to 6 in a hard fought game to reclaim the city trophy for the third straight year. The Panthers received the opening kick-off and the offense drove 68 yards in 8 plays for the touchdown. Paul Reider was credited with the touchdown and James MacMurdo was good on the point after. Pitt 7 to Tech 0. The Panthers were on the Tech 6-yard line on their next possession, but fumbled to thwart the drive. The half ended with no more scoring. In the third quarter Warren Heller completed a 26 yard scoring pass to Reider, and MacMurdo was good again with the placement to double the Panther lead to 14 to 0. Late in the fourth stanza, Tartan second-string quarterback, Angelo Bevevino, threw a 13 yard touchdown pass to John Graveno for a touchdown. Colin Stewart missed the extra point and the final score read 14 to 6.

Coach Sutherland mused: "The Carnegie boys were fighters, they played heads-up football throughout the contest, and I want to compliment them for their fine showing...It was a great battle." Tartan coach Waddell concurred: "We were up against a superior and better football team, but I think the Pitt players and the spectators agree that Carnegie gave the best it had."

The Pitt lineup for the game against Carnegie Tech was Edward Hirshberg (left end), Jesse Quatse (left tackle), Walter Milligan (left guard), Ralph Daugherty (center), Tarciscio Onder (right guard), James MacMurdo (right tackle), Paul Collins (right end), Bob Hogan (quarterback), Warren Heller (left halfback), Paul Reider (right halfback) and James Clark (fullback). Substitutes appearing in the game for Pitt were Theodore Dailey, John Meredith, Francis Seigel, Joseph Tormey, Robert Morris, John Love, Joseph Skladany, Rocco Cutri, Mike Sebastian and John Luch.

While the varsity was retaining the "City Championship Trophy", the Pitt Athletic Council sent a "B" team to Annapolis, MD to play the Naval Academy "B" team. The game ended in a scoreless tie and the proceeds went to the National Unemployment Relief Fund commissioned by President Herbert Hoover.

Scoring summary

Quarter	Time	Drive			Team	Scoring information	Score	
Quarter	Time	Plays	Yards	TOP	Team	Scoring information	Carnegie Tech	Pittsburgh
1		8	68		Pittsburgh	Paul Reider 1-yard touchdown run, James MacMurdo kick good	0	7
3		9	33		Pittsburgh	Reider 26-yard touchdown reception from Warren Heller, MacMurdo kick good	0	14
4		9	55		Carnegie Tech	John Graveno 13-yard touchdown reception from Angelo Bevevino, Colin Stewart kick no good	6	14
"TOP" = time of possession. For other American football terms, see Glossary of American football.							6	14

=== Army ===
Week 8: Army at Pitt

Team	1	2	3	4	Total
Army	0	0	0	0	0
• Pitt	0	7	7	12	26

- Date: November 14, 1931
- Location: Pitt Stadium
  Pittsburgh, PA
- Game start: 2:00 p.m.
- Game weather: drizzle
- Referee: W. G. Crowell (Swarthmore)

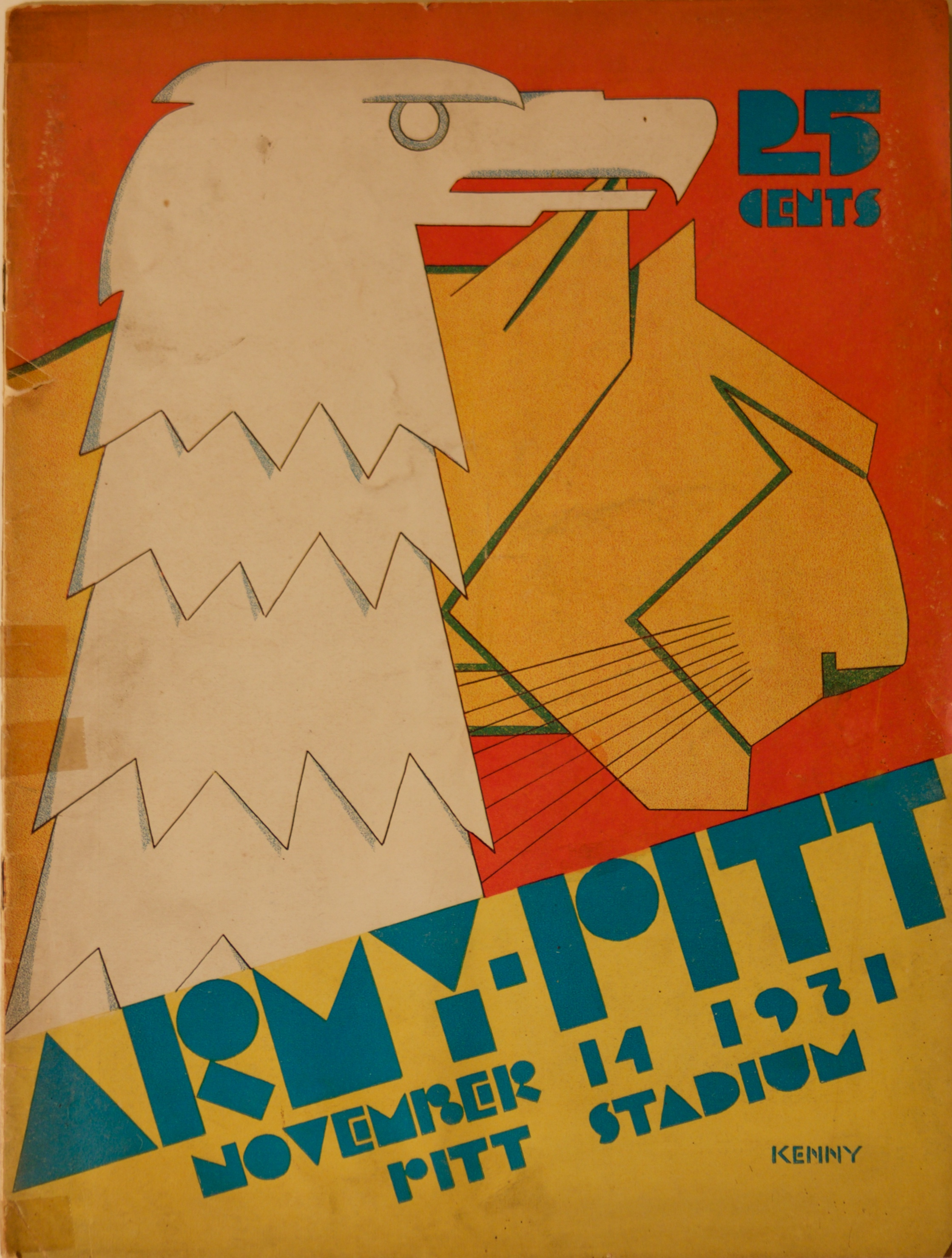
Program for November 14, 1931 Pitt vs. Army game

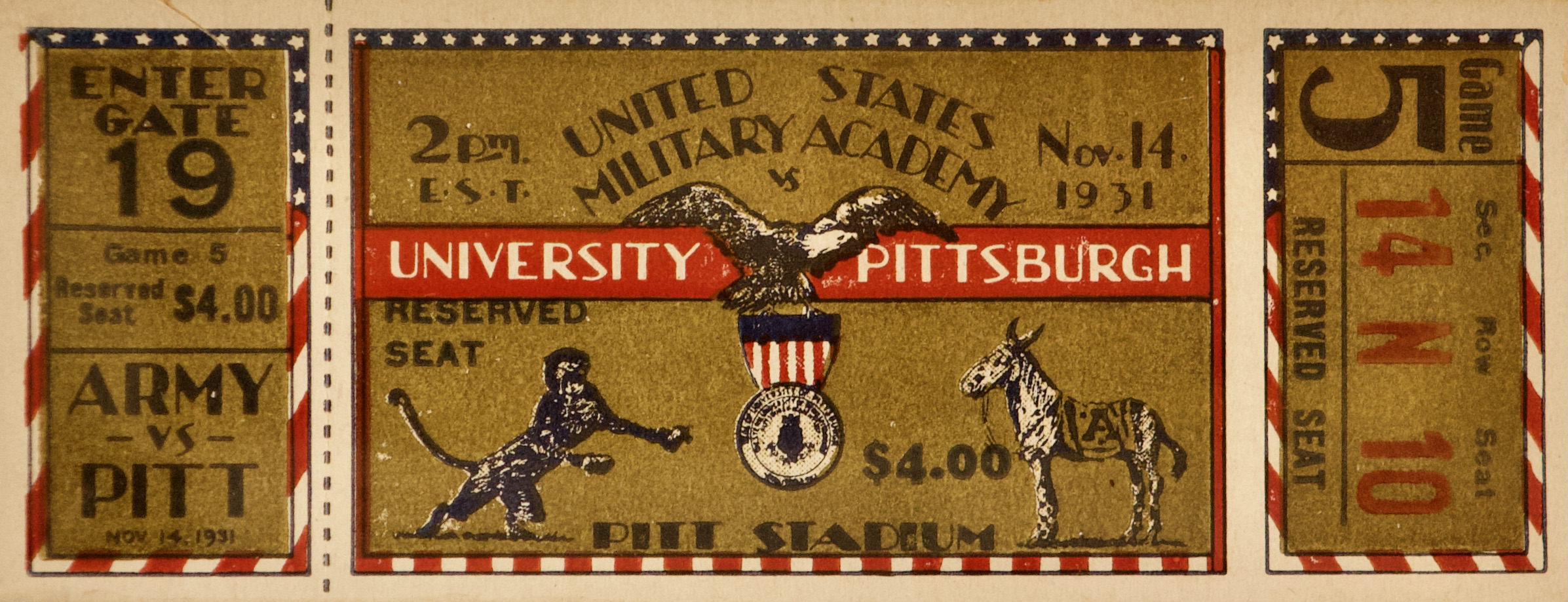
Ticket for November 14, 1931 game vs. Army

On November 14, the entire United States Military Academy Corps of Cadets marched into Pittsburgh for the first gridiron battle between the two schools. The Pittsburgh Sun-Telegraph boasted: "The appearance of the sojers (sic) here is going to be a wow of an event, both from a gridiron and social standpoint. The Corps is to be royally entertained, will be revied (sic) by Gov. Pinchot and city officials and attend a dinner dance at the William Penn after the game."

The Army football eleven was led by second-year coach Ralph Sasse. Two Cadets, tackle John "Jack" Price and halfback Ray Stecker, received All-America mention. The Army record was 5-1-1, and they had outscored their opposition 213-33. Their only missteps were a 14–13 loss to Harvard and a scoreless tie with Yale. Army considered cancelling their season after sophomore Cadet Richard Sheridan broke his neck during the Yale contest and died two days later. The Military Academy decided to continue the season and the team won their next two games. The Post-Gazette reported: "All the Army stars are in good physical shape."

Jock Sutherland told The Pittsburgh Press: "I expect this game to be every bit as tough as that with Notre Dame....I do not believe that it could be any tougher. We have made many mistakes this season, but I think and hope that we have benefited from them. Physically the team is in good shape – as to mental condition we will have to wait until game time. There isn't a better game in prospect anywhere in the country. It will be a great spectacle and a great ball game."

65,000 fans sat in a steady drizzle and witnessed the Panthers defeat the Army 26 to 0 with four touchdown passes. Harry G. Scott noted: "This completely aerial maneuver, the likes of which had never before been demonstrated by Sutherland, shocked and pleased even the sourest of critics.." David Finoli added: "It was a complete destruction of the powerful Army program that the final score could not explain. Pitt racked up 201 yards on the ground and remarkably 293 through the air on ten completions; compared to only 67 total yards and three first downs by the Cadets."

The Panthers lost both their starting quarterback (Bob Hogan) and left end (Eddie Hirschberg) early in the first quarter due to injuries. Rocco Cutri replaced Hogan, but Sutherland had Reider call the plays. Charles J. Doyle of the Sun-Telegraph noticed: "And from that moment, with Paul as senior officer in command and with Rocco as a fine lieutenant, the Panther team clicked as it has not clicked since the days of Pop Warner and the 1916 team." In the second quarter a 62 yard pass from Paul Collins to Paul Reider put the Panthers on the scoreboard. James MacMurdo added the extra point and Pitt led 7 to 0 at halftime. Pitt added another touchdown in the third stanza on a Reider to Warren Heller pass play. MacMurdo was good again on the point after and Pitt led 14 to 0. In the final period Heller connected with both Rocco Cutri and Mike Sebastian on touchdown passes to close out the scoring; both extra points were blocked.

Coach Sasse was gracious in his praise of the Panthers: "Dr. Sutherland's team is a credit to your city. The same courteous treatment showered on the whole Cadet body by your citizens was reflected by the Panthers on the field. They hit our boys hard, but never without sportsmanship. It's hard to take a defeat like that, but when one is so clearly outclassed he should extol the victors. That is what West Point wishes to do." The Cadets recovered from this loss and won their final three games against Ursinus, Notre Dame and Navy to finish the season with an 8–2–1 record.

The Pitt starting lineup for the game against the Army was Eddie Hirshberg (left end), Jesse Quatse (left tackle), Walter Milligan (left guard), Ralph Daugherty (center), Hart Morris (right guard), James MacMurdo (right tackle), Paul Collins (right end), Bob Hogan (quarterback), Warren Heller (left halfback), Paul Reider (right halfback) and John Luch (fullback). Substitutes appearing in the game for Pitt were Theodore Dailey, John Meredith, Francis Seigel, Joseph Tormey, Robert Morris, Tarciscio Onder, John Love, Joe Skladany, Arthur Timmons, Rocco Cutri, Zora Alpert, Mike Sebastian, Dick Matesic, Melvin Brown, James Clark and William Hasson.

Scoring summary

Quarter	Time	Drive			Team	Scoring information	Score	
Quarter	Time	Plays	Yards	TOP	Team	Scoring information	Army	Pittsburgh
2		3	62		Pittsburgh	Paul Reider 62-yard touchdown reception from Paul Collins, MacMurdo kick good	0	7
3		3	16		Pittsburgh	Warren Heller 12-yard touchdown reception from Reider, James MacMurdo kick good	0	14
4		5	45		Pittsburgh	Rocco Cutri 40-yard touchdown reception from Heller, MacMurdo kick no good (blocked)	0	20
4		4	34		Pittsburgh	Mike Sebastian 24-yard touchdown reception from Heller, Cutri kick no good (blocked)	0	26
"TOP" = time of possession. For other American football terms, see Glossary of American football.							0	26

=== Nebraska ===
Week 9: Nebraska at Pitt

Team	1	2	3	4	Total
Nebraska	0	0	0	0	0
• Pitt	6	7	14	13	40

- Date: November 26, 1931
- Location: Pitt Stadium
  Pittsburgh, PA
- Game start: 2:00 p.m.
- Game attendance: 25,368
- Game weather: cold
- Referee: Ed Thorp (De LaSalle)

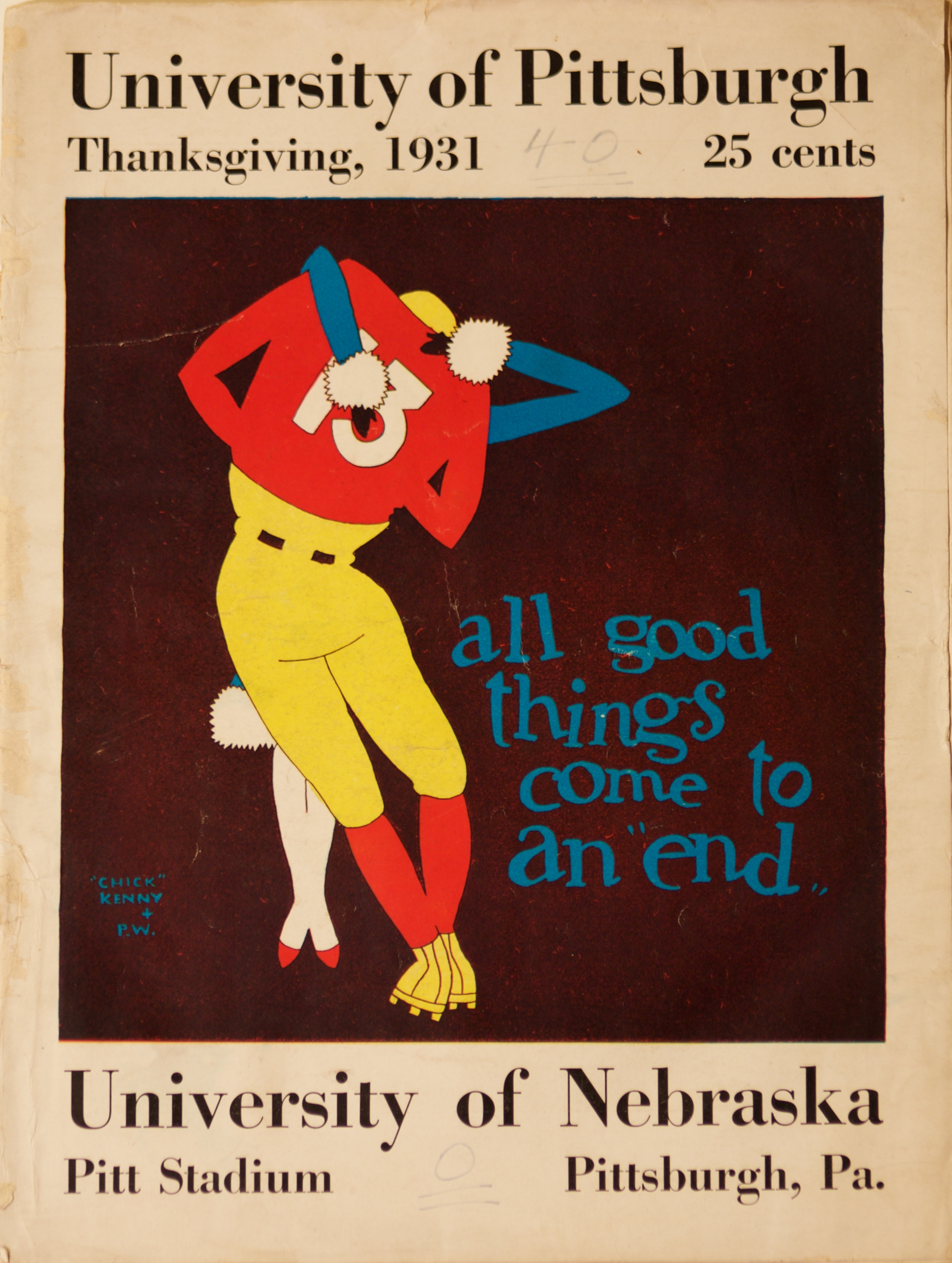
Program for November 26, 1931 Pitt vs. Nebraska game

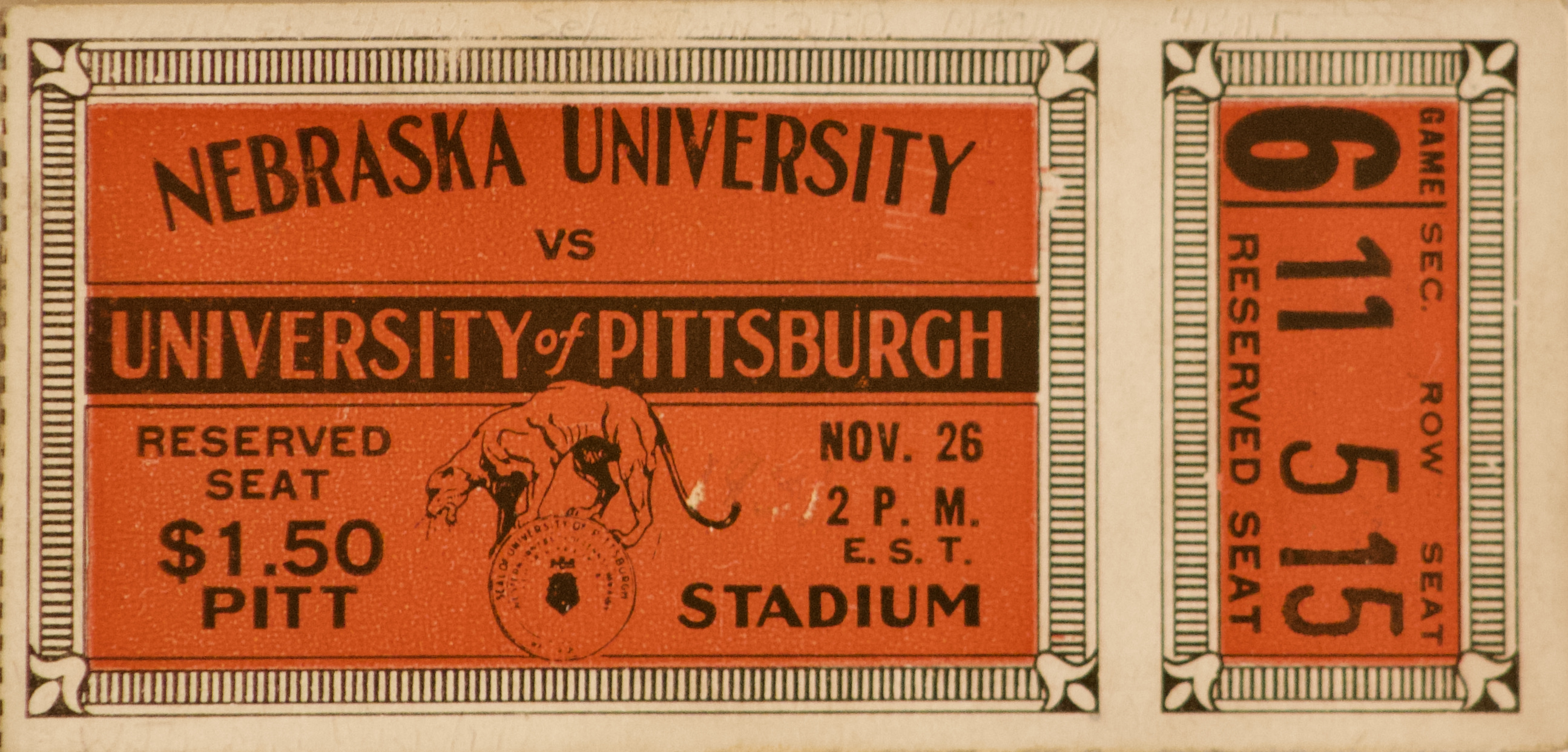
Ticket stub for November 26, 1931 Pitt vs. Nebraska game

On Thanksgiving Day, third-year coach Dana Bible brought his Big 6 Champion Nebraska Cornhuskers, with a 5–0 conference record and overall 7–1 record, to Pittsburgh for their annual intersectional game. The past three games were played in Lincoln, NE. Pitt led the series 2–1–2. The Husker line was anchored by All-America tackle Hugh Rhea. The Pittsburgh Post-Gazette reported: "From end to end the Cornhuskers will average better than 200 pounds. Despite their weight the big linemen move easily and speedily. The team is in the best of spirits, and have been keyed up for this final effort all season."

The football fates smiled on the Panthers the previous Saturday, as USC beat Notre Dame (16–14) and Yale upset Harvard (3–0). Those losses put Pitt back in the lead for the east title and in contention for national honors. Sutherland replaced the injured Bob Hogan at quarterback with Rocco Cutri. The rest of the starting lineup was healthy. Eight regulars (Ed Hirshberg, Paul Collins, James MacMurdo, Jesse Quatse, Hart Morris, Walter Milligan, Ralph Daugherty, James Clark) and four substitutes (Herman Yentch, Robert Morris, Joe Tommins and Ray Anderson) were playing their final game as Pitt Panthers.

The Panthers closed their season with a 40 to 0 rout of the Cornhuskers in front of 25,368 shivering fans. In the second quarter the Nebraska offense reached the Pitt 5-yard line, but Panther center Joseph Tormey intercepted a pass to stop the threat. The remainder of the game was played in Nebraska territory. Warren Heller scored four touchdowns, Mike Sebastian added two, and James MacMurdo converted four placements to total forty points. The game was rough as Panther Paul Reider suffered a shoulder injury and was replaced by Sebastian. Nebraska's tackle Rhea was also injured and saw limited action.

The Panthers earned 23 first downs. They gained 433 yards on the ground and 110 yards through the air by completing 5 of 14 passes. The Pitt defense held the Huskers to 9 first downs and 169 total yards.

The Pitt starting lineup for the game with Nebraska was Edward Hirshberg (left end), Jesse Quatse (left tackle), Walter Milligan (left guard), Ralph Daugherty (center), Hart Morris (right guard), James MacMurdo (right tackle), Paul Collins (right end), Rocco Cutri (quarterback), Warren Heller (left halfback), Paul Reider (right halfback) and Jamers Clark (fullback). Substitutes appearing in the game for Pitt were Mike Sebastian, Joseph Tormey, Theodore Dailey, John Meredith, Tarciscio Onder, John Luch, Bob Hogan, John Love, Melvin Brown, Dick Matesic, James Simms, Robert Morris, Zora Alpert, Howard Yentch, Ray Anderson, Joe Tommins and Arthur Timmons.

Scoring summary

Quarter	Time	Drive			Team	Scoring information	Score	
Quarter	Time	Plays	Yards	TOP	Team	Scoring information	Nebraska	Pittsburgh
1		16	85		Pittsburgh	Warren Heller 4-yard touchdown run, James MacMurdo kick no good	0	6
2		11	47		Pittsburgh	Heller 1-yard touchdown run, MacMurdo kick good	0	13
3		8	55		Pittsburgh	Heller 1-yard touchdown run, MacMurdo kick good	0	20
3		5	56		Pittsburgh	Heller 23-yard touchdown run, MacMurdo kick good	0	27
4		11	59		Pittsburgh	Mike Sebastian 3-yard touchdown run, MacMurdo kick good	0	34
4		3	31		Pittsburgh	Sebastian 29-yard touchdown reception from Heller, John Love kick no good	0	40
"TOP" = time of possession. For other American football terms, see Glossary of American football.							0	40

== Individual scoring summary ==
1931 Pittsburgh Panthers scoring summary
Player	Touchdowns	Extra points	Field goals	Safety	Points
Warren Heller	11	0	0	0	66
Paul Reider	8	0	0	0	48
Mike Sebastian	6	0	0	0	36
John Luch	5	0	0	0	30
Dick Matesic	3	0	0	0	18
James Simms	3	0	0	0	18
Rocco Cutri	1	9	0	0	15
James MacMurdo	0	13	0	0	13
James Clark	2	0	0	0	12
Melvin Brown	1	0	0	0	6
Eric Heller	1	0	0	0	6
Theodore Dailey	1	0	0	0	6
William Hasson	1	0	0	0	6
Totals	43	22	0	0	280

== Postseason ==
Tackle James MacMurdo was selected to play in the East-West Shrine game on January 1, 1932 in San Francisco, CA.

At the athletic banquet given by Chancellor John G. Bowman on December 17, 1931, Paul Reider was elected captain for the 1932 season by his teammates. Twenty-three Panther footballers were awarded a letter. The recipients were Edward Hirshberg, Ralph Daugherty, Joseph Tormey, Hart Morris, Walter Milligan, Francis Seigel, Walter Onder, James MacMurdo, Jesse Quatse, John Love, John Meredith, Paul Collins, Theodore Dailey, Joseph Skladany, Robert Hogan, Rocco Cutri, Paul Reider, Warren Heller, Mike Sebastian, John Luch, James Clark, Robert Morris and Bernard Windt. Athletic Director W. Don Harrison named Jack McParland, a dental student - class of 1934, and Elmer Rosenblum, a student in the College - class of 1933, co-managers of the football team for the 1932 season.

== All-Americans ==
- Ralph Daugherty, center (2nd team Associated Press, 3rd team Newspaper Editors Association; 3rd team International News Service; 1st team Central Press Association; Lawrence Perry)
- James MacMurdo, tackle (2nd team Associated Press, 3rd team Newspaper Editors Association; 3rd team International News Service; Hart, Schaffner and Marx)
- **Jesse Quatse**, Tackle (1st team United Press; 1st team Collier's Weekly as selected by Grantland Rice; 2nd team Central Press Association, Walter Camp Football Foundation; 1st team College Humor magazine; All America Board)

*Bold – Consensus All-American

== List of national championship selectors ==
The 1915 team was selected or recognized as national champions by multiple selectors, of which Parke H. Davis's selection is recognized as "major" (i.e. national in scope) by the official NCAA football records book. College Football Data Warehouse also recognizes Pitt as a national champion in 1915, as did a 1970 Sports Illustrated study that has served as the historical basis of the university's historical national championship claims since its original publication.

These are the selectors that determined Pitt to be national champions in 1931.

- 1st-N-Goal
- Bob Kirlin
- Parke H. Davis*

* A "major" selector that was "national scope" according to the official NCAA football records book.
