= Behringer (surname) =

Behringer is a German surname. Notable people with the surname include:

- Ernst Behringer (1942–2023), German politician
- Jack Behringer (1925–2011), American coach
- Melanie Behringer (born 1985), German footballer
- Robert Behringer (1948–2018), American physicist
- Wolfgang Behringer (born 1956), German historian
