= Edward Hirshberg =

American football player and coach (1908–1983)

Biographical details
- Born: December 27, 1908; Louisville, Kentucky, U.S.
- Died: December 27, 1983 (aged 75); North Miami Beach, Florida, U.S.

Playing career
- 1929–1931: Pittsburgh
- Position: End

Coaching career (HC unless noted)
- 1932: St. Thomas (PA) (assistant)
- 1933–1935: Pittsburgh (ends)
- 1937–1939: Dartmouth (assistant)
- 1940–1941: West Virginia (ends)
- 1942: Yale (ends)
- c. 1950–1959: Carnegie Mellon (assistant)
- 1960–1962: Carnegie Mellon

Head coaching record
- Overall: 5–19

Edward J. Hirshberg (December 27, 1908 – December 27, 1983) was an American football player and coach. He played college football at the University of Pittsburgh as an end and was team captain in 1931. Hirshberg served as the head football coach at the Carnegie Institute of Technology—now known as Carnegie Mellon University—in Pittsburgh, Pennsylvania from 1960 to 1962, compiling a record of 5–19. He also coached as an assistant at his alma mater, Pittsburgh, as well as St. Thomas College—now known as the University of Scranton, Dartmouth College, West Virginia University, and Yale University.

Hirshberg was born in Louisville, Kentucky. During World War II he served in the Pacific as a colonel in the United States Marine Corps. Hirschberg later owned and operated WEDO, a radio station in McKeesport, Pennsylvania. He was also a housing developer, owner of the Boldoc Country Club in Huntingdon, Pennsylvania, and had an association with the Family Furniture Store in McKeesport. Hirshberg died on December 27, 1983, in North Miami Beach, Florida.

== Head coaching record ==
Year	Team	Overall	Conference	Standing	Bowl/playoffs
Carnegie Tech Tartans (West Penn Conference) (1960–1962)
1960	Carnegie Tech	3–5	3–2	3rd	
1961	Carnegie Tech	1–7	0–4	6th	
1962	Carnegie Tech	1–7	0–4	6th	
Carnegie Tech:		5–19	3–10		
Total:		5–19			
