= 1956 Westminster Titans football team =

American college football season

1956 Westminster Titans football
- Conference: Independent
- Record: 8–0
- Head coach: Harold Burry (5th season)
- Home stadium: Memorial Field

The 1956 Westminster Titans football team was an American football team that represented Westminster College as an independent during the 1956 NAIA football season. In their fifth season under head coach Harold Burry, the Titans compiled a perfect 8–0 record and outscored all opponents by a total of 344 to 51.

The 1956 season was part of a 24-game unbeaten streak that began with the second game of the 1954 season (a loss to Carnegie Tech) and ended with the fourth game of the 1957 season (a loss to Geneva). The only setback during the streak was a 7–7 tie with Waynesburg in the fifth game of the 1955 season.

Halfback Bill White led the team in scoring with 11 touchdowns for 66 points. White was selected as a second-team player on the 1956 Associated Press Little All-America team.

Three Westminster players were named to the NAIA District 30 all-star team. Quarterback Harold Davis received more votes than any other player. The other two Westminster honorees were halfback Bill White and end Bill Moss.

Also, in a poll of coaches conducted by The Pittsburgh Press, three Westmminster players won first-team honors on the all-district team. The first-team honorees were quarterback Harold Davis, fullback Bill White, and end Vince Cortese. It was White's third consecutive year on the all-district team. Center Bill Freshwater and tackle Bernie Reilly were named to the second team.

Burry was inducted into the College Football Hall of Fame in 1996.

The team played its home games at Westminster College's Memorial Field in New Wilmington, Pennsylvania.

== Schedule ==
Date	Opponent	Site	Result	Attendance	Source
September 29	at Thiel	Stewart Field; Greenville, PA	W 27–21		
October 6	Grove City	Memorial Field; New Wilmington, PA	W 60–0		
October 13	Bethany (WV)	Wellsburg, WV	W 40–16		
October 20	Geneva^{†}	Memorial Field; New Wilmington, PA	W 28–0	4,000	
October 27	Waynesburg	Memorial Field; New Wilmington, PA	W 42–7		
November 3	Indiana (PA)	Memorial Field; New Wilmington, PA	W 54–7		
November 10	at Slippery Rock	Thompson Field; Slippery Rock, PA	W 45–0		
November 17	Carnegie Tech	Memorial Field; New Wilmington, PA	W 48–0	4,200	
^{†}Homecoming
