= 1964 Westminster Titans football team =

American college football season

1964 Westminster Titans football

WPC champion
- Conference: West Penn Conference
- Record: 8–0 (3–0 WPC)
- Head coach: Harold Burry (13th season)
- Home stadium: Westminster College Memorial Field

1964 West Penn Conference football standings
	Conf.					Overall
Team	W		L		T	W		L		T
No. 6 Westminster (PA) $	3	–	0	–	0	8	–	0	–	0
Waynesburg	2	–	1	–	0	5	–	4	–	0
Geneva	1	–	2	–	0	1	–	6	–	1
Grove City	0	–	3	–	0	4	–	5	–	0
$ – Conference champion; Rankings from NAIA poll

The 1964 Westminster Titans football team was an American football team that represented Westminster College as a member of the West Penn Conference (WPC) during the 1964 NAIA football season. In their 13th season under head coach Harold Burry, the Titans compiled a perfect 8–0 record, won the WPC championship, held seven opponents to seven or fewer points, and outscored all opponents by a total of 249 to 45. They were ranked No. 6 in the final NAIA poll. It was Westminster's first undefeated season since 1956 and its seventh consecutive WPC championship.

The team played its home games at Westminster College Memorial Field in New Wilmington, Pennsylvania.

== Schedule ==
Date	Opponent	Site	Result	Attendance	Source
September 19	at Carnegie Tech*	Tech Stadium; Pittsburgh, PA	W 39–0		
September 26	West Virginia Wesleyan*	Memorial Field; New Wilmington, PA	W 32–7		
October 3	at Grove City	Grove City, PA	W 20–6		
October 10	Geneva^{†}	Memorial Field; New Wilmington, PA	W 38–7		
October 17	at Ferris State*	Big Rapids, MI	W 32–0		
October 24	Waynesburg	Memorial Field; New Wilmington, PA	W 21–18		
October 31	at Glenville State*	Glenville, WV	W 26–0		
November 14	Juniata*	Memorial Field; New Wilmington, PA	W 41–7		
*Non-conference game; ^{†}Homecoming

== Statistics ==
The team was strong in both rushing offense and rushing defense, outgaining opponents by a total of 1,591 to 405 in rushing yardage across all eight games. Opponents averaged only 1.5 yards per rushing carry. The margin in total offense was 2,626 yards to 1,037 yards.

Halfback Gib Armstrong led the team in rushing (88 carries for 454 rushing yards, 4.9 yards per carry), receiving (25 catches for 337 yards), and scoring (63 points on 10 touchdowns and three points after touchdown). Quarterback Smitty Cornell led the team in passing, completing 63 of 113 passes (.558 completion percentage) for 906 yards, 15 touchdowns, and six interceptions.

== Awards and honors ==
Westminster players took 11 of the 22 first-team spots on the 1964 All-West Penn Conference football team. Westminster's honorees on offense were: left halfback John Bailey; right halfback Gib Armstrong; right end Tony Jackson; center Bill Hazen; guard Larry Deibler; and tackle Dave Gura. The honorees on defense were: defensive ends Doug Webb and Doug Kiefer; middle guard Larry Pugh; linebacker Bob Scarazzo; and defensive back Charles Smith. Larry Pugh was also selected as a first-team NAIA All-American.

Burry was inducted into the College Football Hall of Fame in 1996. Dick Bestwick was an assistant coach for the team. He persuaded Burry to implement a platoon system under which players played either offense or defense, but not both.
