= Odell Barry =

American football player (1941–2022)

No. 42
- Position: Wide receiver

Personal information
- Born: October 10, 1941; Memphis, Tennessee, U.S.
- Died: January 3, 2022 (aged 80); Westminster, Colorado, U.S.
- Listed height: 5 ft 10 in (1.78 m)
- Listed weight: 192 lb (87 kg)

Career information
- High school: Toledo (OH) Scott
- College: Findlay
- AFL draft: 1964: 19th round, 145th overall pick

Career history
- Denver Broncos (1964–1965)
- Stats at Pro Football Reference

Odell Carl Barry (October 10, 1941 – January 3, 2022) was an American professional football player who was a wide receiver for the Denver Broncos in the American Football League (AFL). He played college football at Findlay University under head coach Byron E. Morgan. He played professionally for the Broncos in 1964 and 1965. Barry became a real-estate agent and then mayor of Northglenn, Colorado from 1980 to 1982. He also served as a delegate to the 1980 Democratic National Convention.

Barry died from heart disease on January 3, 2022, at the age of 80.

== See also ==
- List of American Football League players
