= Jack Behringer =

American sports coach (1925–2011)

Biographical details
- Born: May 13, 1925; Lima, Ohio, U.S.
- Died: October 5, 2011 (aged 86); Grove City, Pennsylvania, U.S.
- Education: Defiance (1949)

Playing career

Football
- 1946–1948: Defiance

Coaching career (HC unless noted)

Football
- 1949: Wooster HS (OH)
- 1950: Wooster (assistant)
- 1956–1972: Grove City

Basketball
- 1950–1951: Wooster (freshmen)
- 1956–1957: Grove City

Baseball
- 1959–1988: Grove City

Administrative career (AD unless noted)
- 1957–1996: Grove City

Head coaching record
- Overall: 69–68–9 (college football); 12–6 (college basketball)

R. Jack Behringer (May 13, 1925 – October 5, 2011) was an American football, basketball, and baseball coach.

Behringer was a 1949 graduate of Defiance College in Defiance, Ohio. After spending time as an assistant coach at the College of Wooster in Wooster, Ohio, Behringer began a long career in athletics Grove City College in Grove City, Pennsylvania. He served as the school's head football coach from 1956 to 1972. He also served as the head basketball coach at Grove City during the 1956–57 season, but his longest coaching tenure was as Grove City's baseball coach, serving from 1959 to 1988.

== Head coaching record ==
=== College football ===
| Year | Team | Overall | Conference | Standing | Bowl/playoffs |
|---|---|---|---|---|---|
Grove City Wolverines (NAIA / NAIA Division II independent) (1956–1972)
| 1956 | Grove City | 0–8 | | | |
| 1957 | Grove City | 5–3 | | | |
| 1958 | Grove City | 5–2 | | | |
| 1959 | Grove City | 3–5–1 | | | |
| 1960 | Grove City | 2–4–3 | | | |
| 1961 | Grove City | 5–4 | | | |
| 1962 | Grove City | 6–3 | | | |
| 1963 | Grove City | 4–4 | | | |
| 1964 | Grove City | 4–5 | | | |
| 1965 | Grove City | 4–4–1 | | | |
| 1966 | Grove City | 8–0–1 | | | |
| 1967 | Grove City | 6–3 | | | |
| 1968 | Grove City | 7–2 | | | |
| 1969 | Grove City | 3–4–1 | | | |
| 1970 | Grove City | 5–3–1 | | | |
| 1971 | Grove City | 2–6–1 | | | |
| 1972 | Grove City | 0–8 | | | |
| Grove City: | | 69–68–9 | | | |
| Total: | | 69–68–9 | | | |
