= Eastern Pennsylvania Collegiate Basketball League =

The Eastern Pennsylvania Collegiate Basketball League (EPCBL), also known as the Eastern Pennsylvania Conference (EPC) and Eastern Pennsylvania Collegiate League, was a collegiate basketball league that began in the 1931–32 season.

The original seven teams included:

- Gettysburg
- Franklin & Marshall
- Albright
- Ursinus
- Muhlenberg
- Lebanon Valley
- Drexel

== Member schools ==
Institution	Location	Nickname	First season	Last season
Albright College	Reading, Pennsylvania	Lions	1931–32	1941–42
Drexel University	Philadelphia, Pennsylvania	Dragons	1931–32	1938–39
Franklin & Marshall College	Lancaster, Pennsylvania	Diplomats	1931–32	
Gettysburg College	Gettysburg, Pennsylvania	Bullets	1931–32	1941–42
Lebanon Valley College	Annville, Pennsylvania	Flying Dutchmen	1931–32	
Muhlenberg College	Allentown, Pennsylvania	Mules	1931–32	
Ursinus College	Collegeville, Pennsylvania	Bears	1931–32	1940–41
Bucknell University	Lewisburg, Pennsylvania	Bison	1939–40	

== Champions ==
Season	Champion
1931–32	Gettysburg
1932–33	Gettysburg
1933–34	Gettysburg
1934–35	Gettysburg
1935–36	Franklin & Marshall
1936–37	Franklin & Marshall
1937–38	Gettysburg
1938–39	Gettysburg
1939–40	Franklin & Marshall
1940–41	Franklin & Marshall
1941–42	Franklin & Marshall
1942–43	*None

*In March 1942, it was decided that no 1943 league champion would be recognized since all the teams would not be able to play each other.
