= Byron E. Morgan =

American football player and coach

Biographical details
- Born: 1917
- Died: 1997 (aged 79–80)

Playing career
- c. 1939: Geneva
- 1940–1944: Pittsburgh Steelers
- Position: Fullback

Coaching career (HC unless noted)
- c. 1946: New Brighton HS (PA) (backfield)
- 1947–1952: Boardman HS (OH)
- 1953–1962: Geneva
- 1963–1974: Findlay

Head coaching record
- Overall: 101–93–8 (college)

Byron E. Morgan (1917−1997) was an American football coach and NFL fullback. Morgan played for the Pittsburgh Steelers and Philadelphia Eagles Morgan is credited after his playing career to have created the no-huddle offense, a highly used play today. He served as the head football coach at Geneva College from 1953 to 1962 and Findlay College—now known as the University of Findlay—from 1963 to 1974, compiling career college football coaching record of 101–93–8.

He was married in 1941 to Gretchen Morgan (b. 1916 in Ohio).

== Coaching career ==
=== Geneva ===
Morgan was the 22nd head football coach at Geneva College in Beaver Falls, Pennsylvania and held that position for ten seasons, from 1953 to 1962. His coaching record at Geneva was 46–35–6.

=== Findlay ===
After coaching at Geneva, Morgan moved to Findlay College—now known as the University of Findlay–in Findlay, Ohio. He was head coach at Findlay from 1963 until the completion of the 1974 season and accumulated a record of 55–58–2 with appearances in the 1964 NAIA playoffs in 1964 and a victory in the 1967 Shrine Bowl. At Findlay, he coached future National Football League (NFL) players Odell Barry, Tony King, and Allen Smith.

== Political life ==
After retirement from college football, Morgan remained at Findlay as an instructor and also entered local politics to serve as a city council for Findlay.
