= West Penn Conference =

- Founded: 1958
- Folded: 1969
- No. of teams: 8
- Region: Western Pennsylvania

The West Penn Conference (WPC) was an intercollegiate athletic conference that operated from 1958 to 1969. Its members were located in Western Pennsylvania and included the Carnegie Institute of Technology (now known as Carnegie Mellon University) in Pittsburgh, Duquesne University in Pittsburgh, Geneva College in Beaver Falls, Grove City College in Grove City, Saint Francis University in Loretto, Saint Vincent College in Latrobe, Waynesburg College (now known as Waynesburg University) in Waynesburg, and Westminster College in New Wilmington.

== Football champions ==
- 1958 – Westminster (PA)
- 1959 – Westminster (PA)
- 1960 – Westminster (PA)
- 1961 – Westminster (PA)
- 1962 – Westminster (PA)
- 1963 – Waynesburg and Westminster (PA)
- 1964 – Westminster (PA)
- 1965 – Waynesburg
- 1966 – Waynesburg
- 1967 – Waynesburg
- 1968 – Waynesburg

== Yearly football standings ==
1958 West Penn Conference football standings
	Conf.					Overall
Team	W		L		T	W		L		T
Westminster (PA) $	3	–	1	–	0	6	–	1	–	1
Geneva	2	–	1	–	1	5	–	3	–	1
Saint Vincent	1	–	1	–	1	4	–	2	–	1
Carnegie Tech *	1	–	1	–	0	6	–	2	–	0
Waynesburg	0	–	3	–	0	3	–	5	–	1
$ – Conference champion; * – ineligible for conference title

1959 West Penn Conference football standings
	Conf.					Overall
Team	W		L		T	W		L		T
Westminster (PA) $	5	–	0	–	0	6	–	2	–	0
Carnegie Tech	3	–	1	–	0	7	–	1	–	0
Geneva	2	–	2	–	0	7	–	2	–	0
Saint Vincent	1	–	3	–	0	3	–	4	–	0
Grove City	0	–	2	–	1	3	–	5	–	1
Waynesburg	0	–	3	–	1	1	–	6	–	2
$ – Conference champion

1960 West Penn Conference football standings
	Conf.					Overall
Team	W		L		T	W		L		T
Westminster (PA) $	5	–	0	–	0	5	–	3	–	0
Saint Vincent	4	–	1	–	0	4	–	3	–	1
Carnegie Tech	3	–	2	–	0	3	–	5	–	0
Geneva	1	–	3	–	0	4	–	5	–	0
Grove City	0	–	3	–	1	2	–	4	–	3
Waynesburg	0	–	4	–	1	0	–	8	–	1
$ – Conference champion

1961 West Penn Conference football standings
	Conf.					Overall
Team	W		L		T	W		L		T
Westminster (PA) $	4	–	1	–	0	6	–	2	–	0
Grove City	2	–	0	–	0	5	–	4	–	0
Waynesburg	2	–	2	–	0	6	–	2	–	0
Saint Vincent	2	–	2	–	0	3	–	3	–	1
Geneva	1	–	2	–	0	4	–	4	–	0
Carnegie Tech	0	–	4	–	0	1	–	7	–	0
$ – Conference champion

1962 West Penn Conference football standings
	Conf.					Overall
Team	W		L		T	W		L		T
Westminster (PA) $	5	–	0	–	0	6	–	2	–	0
Waynesburg	3	–	1	–	0	5	–	3	–	0
Grove City	2	–	1	–	0	6	–	3	–	0
Geneva	1	–	3	–	0	1	–	5	–	1
Saint Vincent	1	–	3	–	0	1	–	6	–	0
Carnegie Tech	0	–	4	–	0	1	–	7	–	0
$ – Conference champion

1963 West Penn Conference football standings
	Conf.					Overall
Team	W		L		T	W		L		T
Waynesburg +	2	–	0	–	0	6	–	2	–	0
Westminster (PA) +	2	–	1	–	0	5	–	2	–	1
Geneva	1	–	2	–	0	1	–	7	–	0
Grove City	0	–	2	–	0	4	–	4	–	0
+ – Conference co-champions; Waynesburg and Westminster (PA) tied for the conference title based on two points per victory.

1964 West Penn Conference football standings
	Conf.					Overall
Team	W		L		T	W		L		T
No. 6 Westminster (PA) $	3	–	0	–	0	8	–	0	–	0
Waynesburg	2	–	1	–	0	5	–	4	–	0
Geneva	1	–	2	–	0	1	–	6	–	1
Grove City	0	–	3	–	0	4	–	5	–	0
$ – Conference champion; Rankings from NAIA poll

1965 West Penn Conference football standings
	Conf.					Overall
Team	W		L		T	W		L		T
Waynesburg $	2	–	0	–	1	6	–	2	–	1
Westminster (PA)	2	–	1	–	0	5	–	3	–	0
Grove City	1	–	1	–	1	4	–	4	–	1
Geneva	0	–	3	–	0	3	–	5	–	0
$ – Conference champion

1967 West Penn Conference football standings
	Conf.					Overall
Team	W		L		T	W		L		T
No. 7 Waynesburg $	2	–	0	–	0	8	–	1	–	0
Westminster (PA)	2	–	1	–	0	6	–	2	–	0
Grove City	1	–	1	–	0	6	–	3	–	0
Geneva	0	–	3	–	0	1	–	7	–	0
$ – Conference champion; Rankings from NAIA poll

1967 West Penn Conference football standings
	Conf.					Overall
Team	W		L		T	W		L		T
No. 7 Waynesburg $	2	–	0	–	0	8	–	1	–	0
Westminster (PA)	2	–	1	–	0	6	–	2	–	0
Grove City	1	–	1	–	0	6	–	3	–	0
Geneva	0	–	3	–	0	1	–	7	–	0
$ – Conference champion; Rankings from NAIA poll

1968 West Penn Conference football standings
	Conf.					Overall
Team	W		L		T	W		L		T
No. 19 Waynesburg $	2	–	0	–	0	7	–	2	–	0
Westminster (PA)	1	–	1	–	0	6	–	2	–	0
Geneva	0	–	2	–	0	0	–	7	–	1
$ – Conference champion; Rankings from NAIA poll

== See also ==
- List of defunct college football conferences
