= Waynesburg Historic District =

Historic district in Pennsylvania, United States

- U.S. National Register of Historic Places
- U.S. Historic district
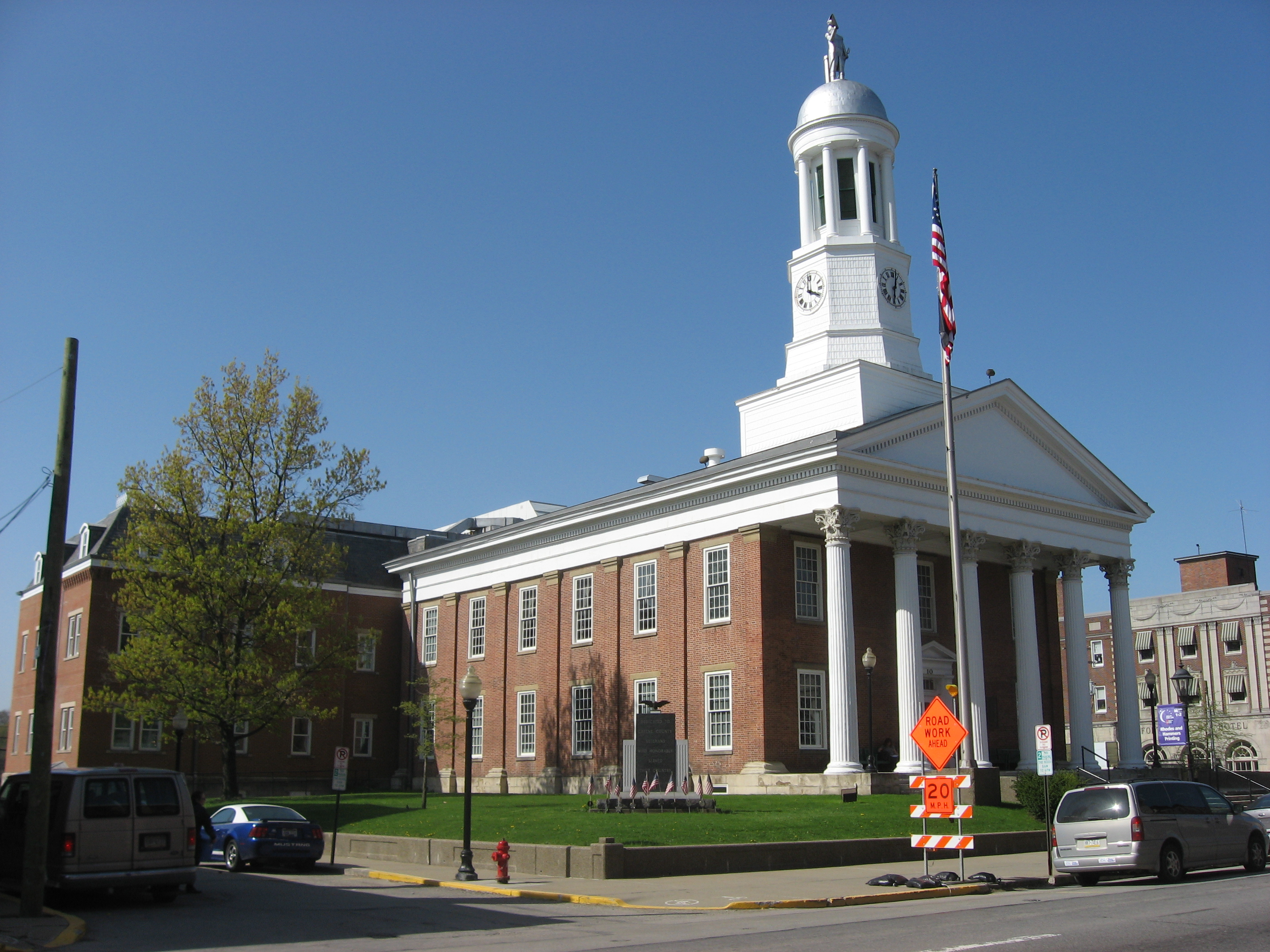
- Greene County Courthouse, April 2010

- Location within Pennsylvania Location within the United States
- Location: Roughly bounded by 2nd Alley, Cherry Ave., East and Bowlby Sts., Waynesburg, Pennsylvania
- Coordinates: 39°53′51″N 80°11′18″W
- Area: 61.4 acres (24.8 ha)
- Architectural style: Late 19th And 20th Century Revivals, Late Victorian
- NRHP reference No.: 84003392
- Added to NRHP: March 1, 1984

The Waynesburg Historic District is a national historic district that is located in Waynesburg, Greene County, Pennsylvania.

It was added to the National Register of Historic Places in 1984.

== History and architectural features ==
This district encompasses 183 contributing buildings that are located in the central business district and surrounding residential areas of Waynesburg. The buildings include notable examples of High Victorian Italianate, Second Empire, Queen Anne, and Georgian Revival-style architecture. Notable non-residential buildings include ten buildings associated with Waynesburg University, seven churches, the Greene County Courthouse, the Greene County Jail, and the Waynesboro Borough Building. Among the buildings at Waynesburg University are the separately listed Hanna Hall and Miller Hall.
