= Mary Temple Bayard =

American writer, journalist (1853–1916)

Mary Temple Bayard Jamison
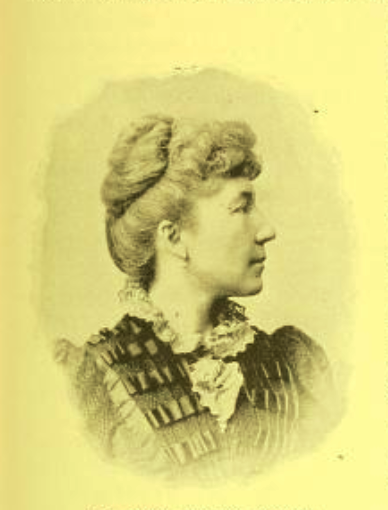
- Born: Mary J. Temple; July 23, 1853; Waynesburg, Pennsylvania, U.S.
- Died: August 17, 1916 (aged 63); Latrobe, Pennsylvania, U.S.
- Resting place: Unity Cemetery, Unity Township, Pennsylvania, U.S.
- Education: Waynesburg College
- Occupations: writer; journalist
- Spouses: William J. Bayard (m. 1869; div. 1872); William Armstrong Jamison (m. 1897)
- Children: Justus Temple Bayard
- Relatives: Justus Fordyce Temple (father)
- Writing career
- Pen name: Meg
- Language: English

Mary Temple Bayard (née, Temple; after first marriage, Bayard, after second marriage, Jamison; pen name, Meg; July 23, 1853 – August 17, 1916) was an American writer and journalist. Her literary work was mostly written for magazines in the interest of women's social reform and philanthropic movements. Her reputation as a writer was made under the pen name of "Meg".

== Early life and education ==
Mary J. Temple was born in Waynesburg, Greene County, Pennsylvania, July 23, 1853. Her parents were Justus Fordyce Temple (1824–1895), and Nancy Ann Schroy (1836–1875). Mary had three siblings, including Anna and James.

She was educated at Waynesburg College (now Waynesburg University), but dropped out before finishing. She eventually returned to Waynesburg College and finished her education with her son, Temple, her last session in college being his first.

== Career ==
In 1869, she married William J. Bayard (1849–1924). They had one child, Justus Temple Bayard (1872–1893). In the same year of their son's birth, the couple divorced and William remarried.

For some time during her adult life, Bayard's resided in Allegheny, Pennsylvania, and in Pittsburgh, Pennsylvania.

Her first article that called out editorial comment was written from Montreal, Canada, to a home paper in Waynesburg, and copied in the Pittsburgh Post. It was greatly praised, and friends urged her to continue writing. With characteristic modesty, she fancied that that letter being signed by her full name, and her father being a prominent politician and a personal friend of the publishers of the Post, they had copied it out of compliment to him only. She was finally induced, however, to test the merit of her work by writing under a pen name, and sent an article to a Sunday paper in Pittsburgh. It was a burlesque on the then prevailing fashions, and received so much notice that the editor of the paper advertised for "Meg" to call at the office of the Pittsburgh Dispatch and make herself known. The result was a permanent engagement, and ever after, her work found such ready sale that she was in constant demand. Bayard later became a member of the staff of the Philadelphia Times. She continued to use the pen name for her gossip-related work, while she signed her full name to her literary labors for magazines.

In the early 1890s, for 14 months, Bayard was in the hospital with her son, Temple, and wrote to earn the money that paid for his bed. Once, she finished important work while he was in the operating room. After he died, in 1893, she was left alone. She then overworked so continually that she was often ill. At the close of the Press Congress of the World's Columbian Exposition, Chicago, May 1893, Bayard presented her paper on "Woman in Journalism".

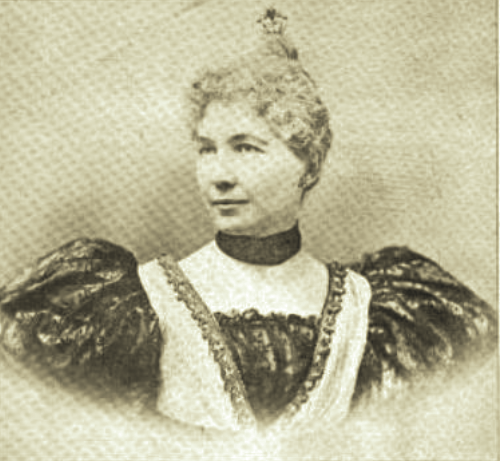
1895

On December 22, 1897, at Kings, New York, she married William Armstrong Jamison (1855–1928), a physician. The marriage occurred during the period she published in the Home Monthly. After marriage, she removed to Latrobe, Pennsylvania, and then at McDonald, Pennsylvania.

In April 1899, Bayard was a delegate to the International League of Press Clubs' convention in Baltimore.

Bayard was a member of the Woman's National Press League, the Women's Press Club (of Pittsburgh), and the League of American pen Women.

== Personal life ==
Bayard traveled extensively both in her own country and Europe. In 1908, Bayard was hospitalized for several months.

She was a member of the Daughters of the American Revolution. In religion, she was a Cumberland Presbyterian.

Following a protracted illness, extending over more than a year, her condition had been extremely critical for some time, Mary Temple Bayard Jamison died at Latrobe, August 17, 1916. She was buried at the Unity Cemetery, Unity Township, Pennsylvania.

== Selected works ==
- "Our Hospital Nurses", 1893
- "Woman in Journalism", 1894
- "How to Beautify a Home", 1894
- "Going Out of Town. Timely Reflections for Next Season.", 1894
- "Dr. Oronhyatekha", 1896
