= Greene County Airport =

Greene County Airport may refer to:

- Greene County–Lewis A. Jackson Regional Airport, an airport serving Xenia, Ohio, United States (FAA: I19)
- Greene County Airport (Pennsylvania), an airport serving Waynesburg, Pennsylvania, United States (FAA: WAY)
