= Wayne, Pennsylvania (disambiguation) =

Wayne, Pennsylvania is an unincorporated community in Delaware County.

Wayne, Pennsylvania may also refer to:

- Wayne County, Pennsylvania
- Waynesburg, Pennsylvania
