= Bridge in Franklin Township =

- U.S. National Register of Historic Places
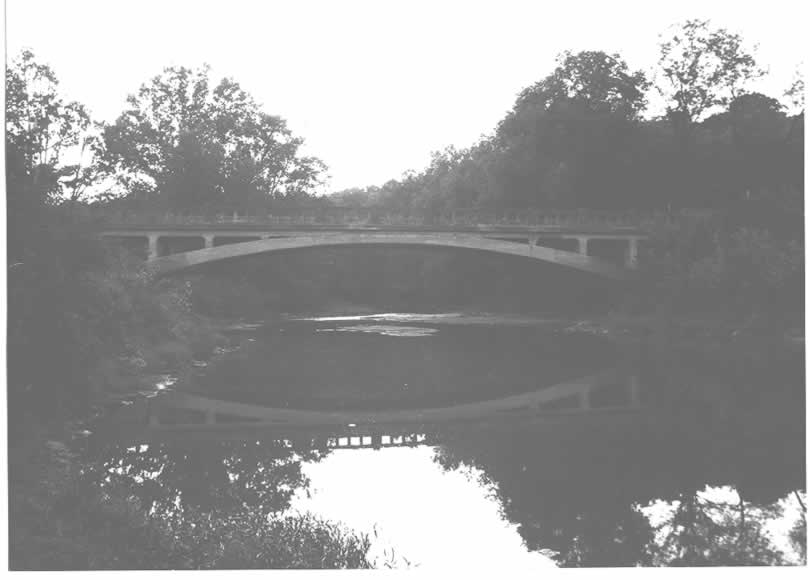
- Bridge in Franklin Township, 1982

- Location within Pennsylvania Location within the United States
- Location: Pennsylvania Route 188 over Ten Mile Creek at Morrisville, Franklin Township, Pennsylvania
- Coordinates: 39°53′37″N 80°10′47″W
- Area: less than one acre
- Built: 1919–1920
- Built by: T.B. Dinsmore, Lippencott Brothers
- Architectural style: Open-spandrel arch
- MPS: Highway Bridges Owned by the Commonwealth of Pennsylvania, Department of Transportation TR
- NRHP reference No.: 88000766
- Added to NRHP: June 22, 1988

Bridge in Franklin Township is a historic arch bridge located at Franklin Township in Greene County, Pennsylvania. It is a 132-foot-long (40 m), open spandrel, concrete arch bridge constructed in 1919-1921. It crosses Ten Mile Creek.

It was listed on the National Register of Historic Places in 1988.
