= Miller Hall (Waynesburg University) =

- U.S. National Register of Historic Places
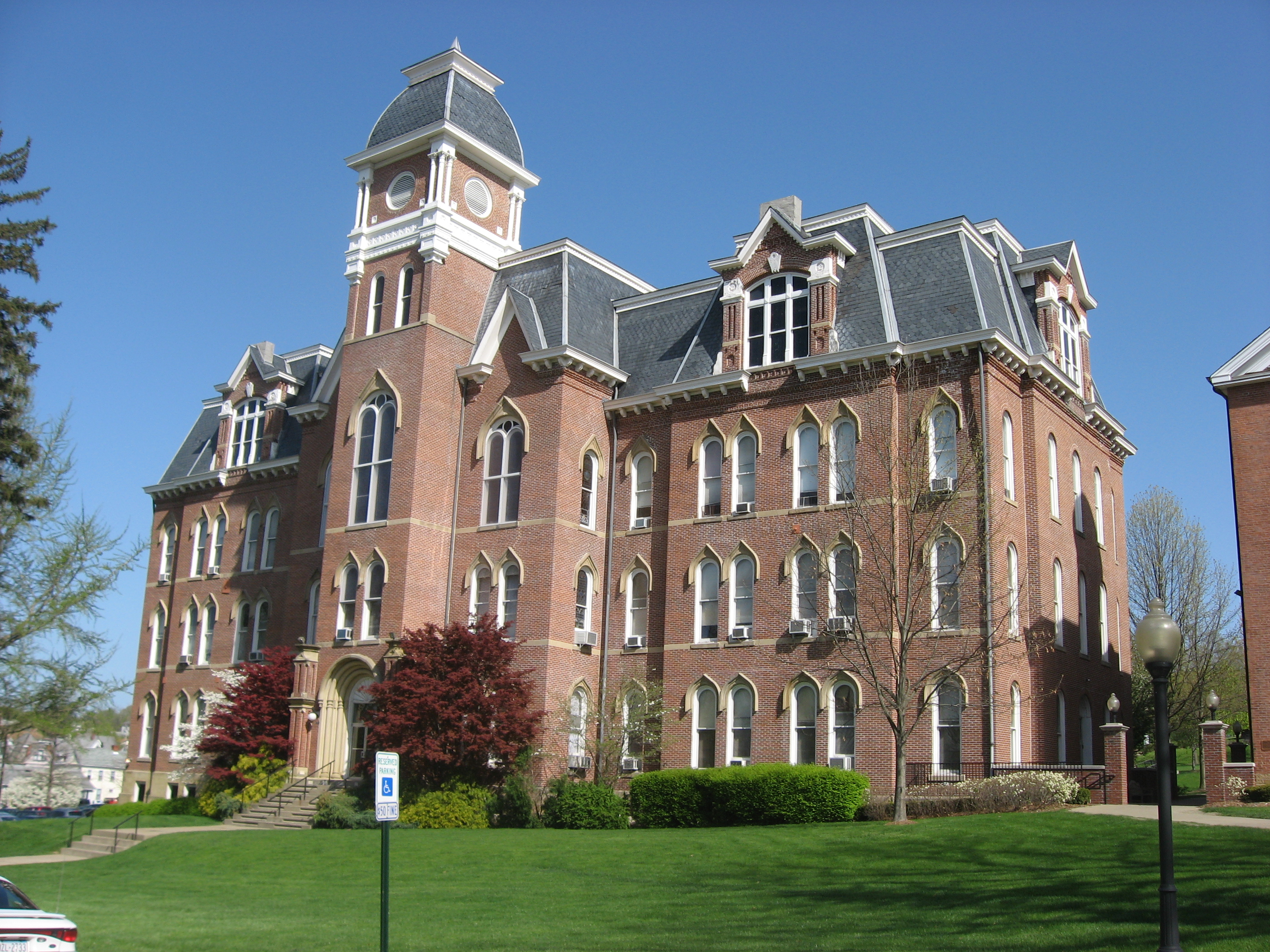
- Miller Hall, April 2010

- Location within Pennsylvania Location within the United States
- Location: 51 W. College St., Waynesburg, Pennsylvania
- Coordinates: 39°53′58″N 80°11′17″W
- Area: less than one acre
- Built: 1879-1899
- Architect: Drumm, J.W.
- Architectural style: Second Empire
- NRHP reference No.: 78002405
- Added to NRHP: April 14, 1978

Miller Hall is an historic building that is located on the campus of Waynesburg University in Waynesburg in Greene County, Pennsylvania, United States.

Part of the Waynesburg Historic District, it was listed on the National Register of Historic Places in 1978.

== History and architectural features ==
Located directly to the west of Hanna Hall, this structure was built between 1879 and 1899, and is a three-story, brick and sandstone building that was designed in the Second Empire style. It has a mansard roof and measures 158 feet long and 54 feet wide, with a cross-section that is 86 feet long and 50 feet wide. It was named for Alfred Brashear Miller, the president of Waynesburg College from 1859 to 1899. This building has housed administrative offices, classrooms, a laboratory, library, chapel, the Alumni Hall, and the "Martin Room."
