= Franklin Township, Greene County, Pennsylvania =

Township in Pennsylvania, US

Coordinates: 39°52′00″N 80°06′59″W

- Township
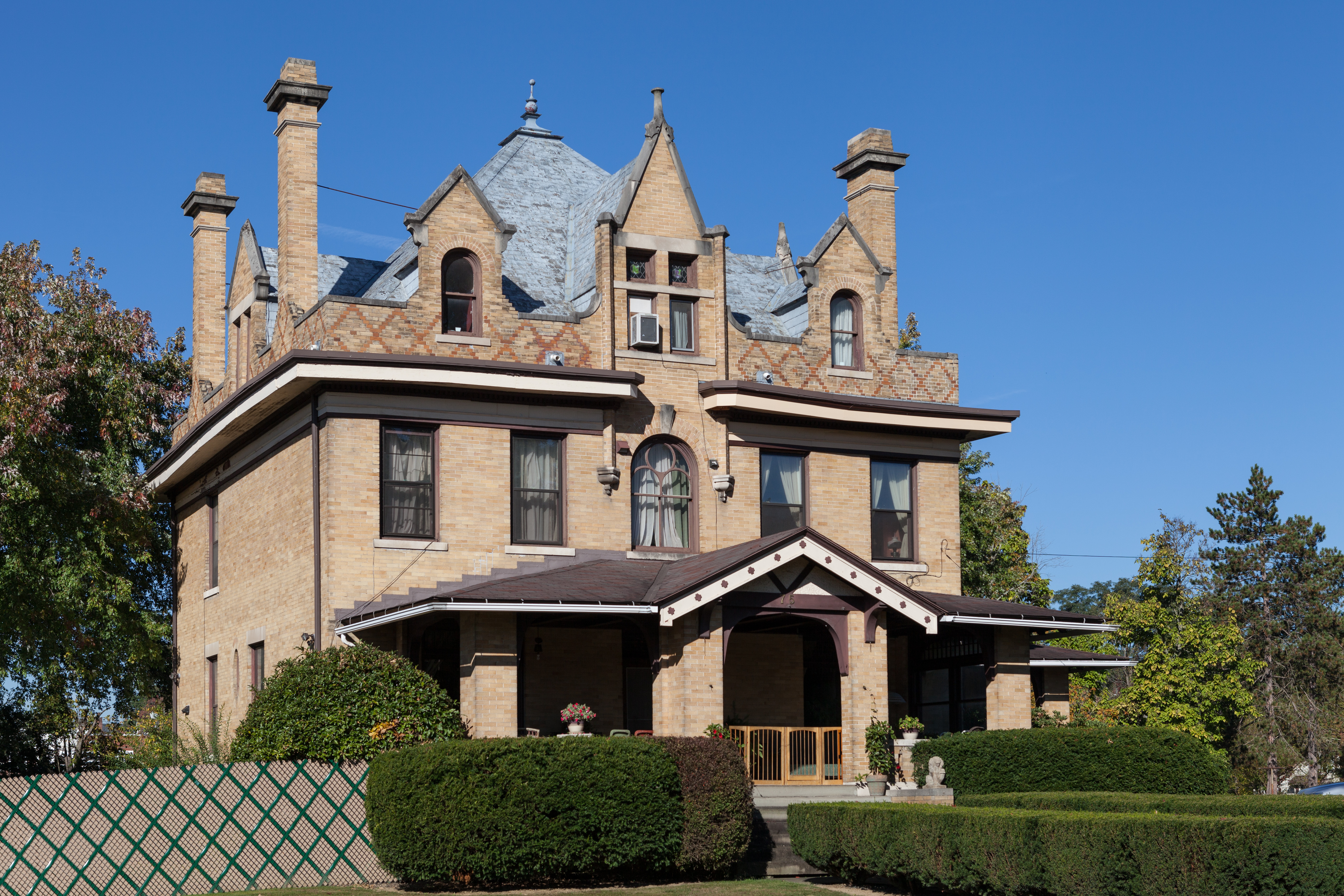
- Charles Grant Heasley House

- Logo

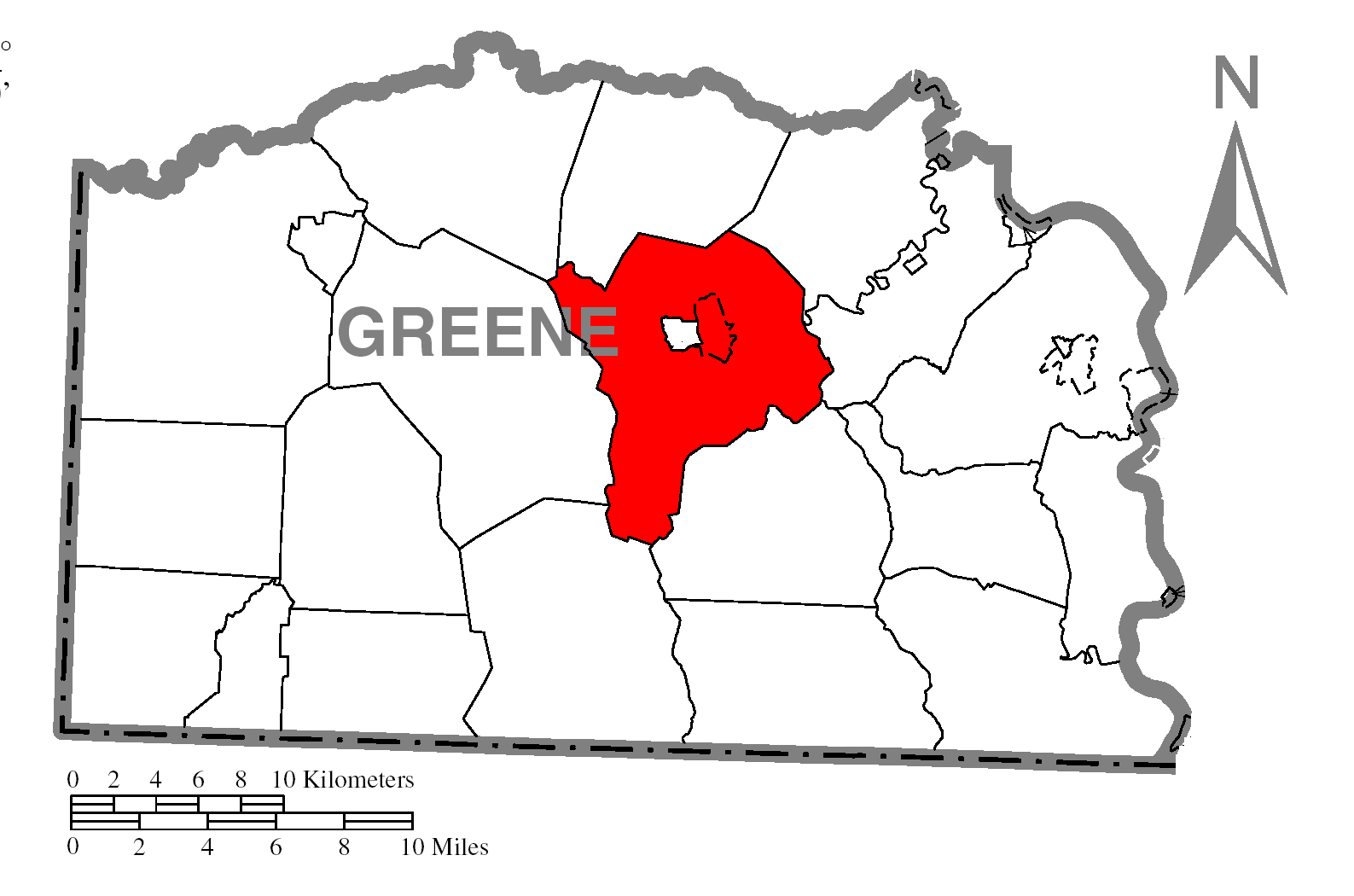
- Location of Franklin Township in Greene County

- Location of Greene County in Pennsylvania
- Country: United States
- State: Pennsylvania
- County: Greene

Area
  - Total: 40.62 sq mi (105.21 km^{2})
  - Land: 40.59 sq mi (105.12 km^{2})
  - Water: 0.035 sq mi (0.09 km^{2})

Population (2020)
  - Total: 7,067 ▼
  - Estimate (2023): 6,739
  - Density: 172.4/sq mi (66.57/km^{2})
- Time zone: UTC-4 (EST)
  - Summer (DST): UTC-5 (EDT)
- Area code: 724
- FIPS code: 42-059-27408
- Website: www.franklintownshipgreenecounty.com

Franklin Township is a township in Greene County, Pennsylvania, United States. The population was 7,067 at the 2020 census, down from 7,280 at the 2010 census.

== History ==
The Charles Grant Heasley House, Greene Hills Farm, Bridge in Franklin Township, and Thomas Kent Jr. Farm are listed on the National Register of Historic Places.

== Geography ==
The township is in central Greene County and surrounds the borough of Waynesburg, a separate municipality which is the county seat. The South Fork of Tenmile Creek, a tributary of the Monongahela River, flows from west to east through the center of the township and forms part of the border between the township and Waynesburg. According to the United States Census Bureau, the township has a total area of 40.6 square miles (105.2 km^{2}), of which 40.6 square miles (105.1 km^{2}) is land and 0.04 square miles (0.1 km^{2}), or 0.09%, is water.

West Waynesburg and Morrisville are census-designated places within Franklin Township. Other unincorporated communities in the township are Rees Mill, East View, Brant Hill, and Blairtown. Interstate 79 passes north to south through the east side of the township, with access from Exit 14 (Pennsylvania Route 21) just east of Morrisville. Greene County Airport is in the northeast part of the township along PA 21 just east of I-79.

== Demographics ==
Historical population
Census	Pop.	Note	%±
2000	7,694		—
2010	7,280		−5.4%
2020	7,067		−2.9%
2025 (est.)	6,653		−5.9%
U.S. Decennial Census

As of the census of 2000, there were 7,694 people, 2,157 households, and 1,524 families residing in the township. The population density was 188.2 inhabitants per square mile (72.7/km^{2}). There were 2,291 housing units at an average density of 56.0 per square mile (21.6/km^{2}). The racial makeup of the township was 81.06% White, 17.86% African American, 0.04% Native American, 0.52% Asian, 0.01% Pacific Islander, 0.13% from other races, and 0.38% from two or more races. Hispanic or Latino of any race were 2.68% of the population.

There were 2,157 households, out of which 32.0% had children under the age of 18 living with them, 54.5% were married couples living together, 12.9% had a female householder with no husband present, and 29.3% were non-families. 25.5% of all households were made up of individuals, and 11.9% had someone living alone who was 65 years of age or older. The average household size was 2.45 and the average family size was 2.91.

In the township the population was spread out, with 17.0% under the age of 18, 10.5% from 18 to 24, 36.7% from 25 to 44, 22.3% from 45 to 64, and 13.5% who were 65 years of age or older. The median age was 37 years. For every 100 females there were 159.2 males. For every 100 females age 18 and over, there were 174.0 males.

The median income for a household in the township was $29,747, and the median income for a family was $35,852. Males had a median income of $26,875 versus $22,531 for females. The per capita income for the township was $13,066. About 16.0% of families and 17.3% of the population were below the poverty line, including 27.3% of those under age 18 and 10.1% of those age 65 or over.

== Government and infrastructure ==
The SCI-Greene prison, operated by the Pennsylvania Department of Corrections, is located in the township.

== Transportation ==
Greene County Airport is located in the township.

== Education ==
The school district is Central Greene School District.
