= Charles Grant Heasley House =

Historic house in Pennsylvania, US

- U.S. National Register of Historic Places
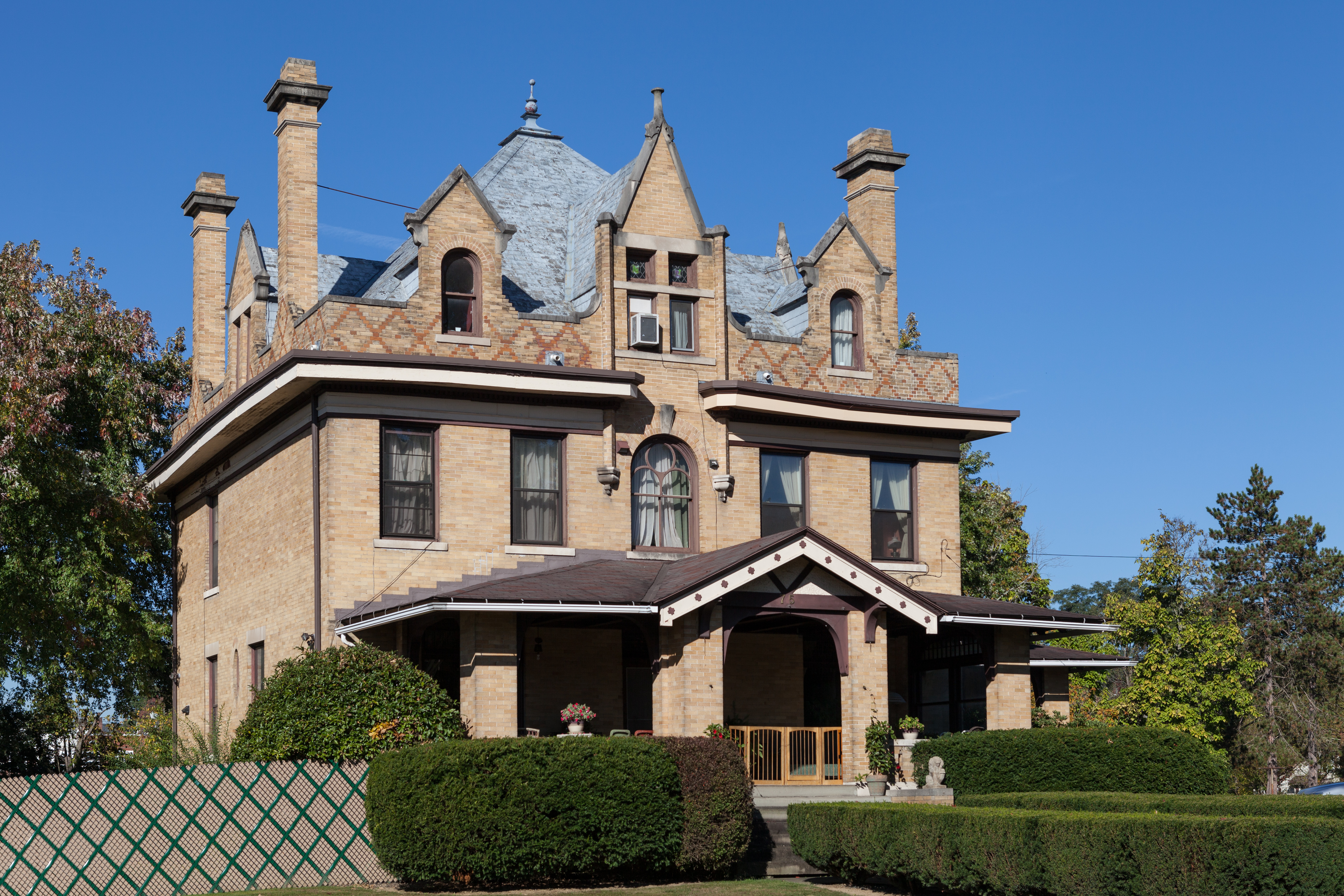
- The house in September 2014

- Location within Pennsylvania Location within the United States
- Location: 75 Sherman Avenue in the Bonar Addition, east of Waynesburg, Franklin Township, Pennsylvania
- Coordinates: 39°53′50″N 80°10′30″W
- Area: 1 acre (0.40 ha)
- Built: 1903–1905
- Architectural style: Late 19th And 20th Century Revivals, Chateauesque
- NRHP reference No.: 91000091
- Added to NRHP: February 21, 1991

Charles Grant Heasley House is a historic home located at Franklin Township in Greene County, Pennsylvania. It was built between 1903 and 1905, and is a three-story, square brick building with a slate covered hipped roof. It measures approximately 42 feet by 42 feet, and sits on a stone foundation. The roofline features four chimneys, four spires, a pinnacle with finial, and six dormers. The house is representative of the Châteauesque style.

It was listed on the National Register of Historic Places in 1991.
