= Thomas Kent Jr. Farm =

Historic house in Pennsylvania, United States

- U.S. National Register of Historic Places
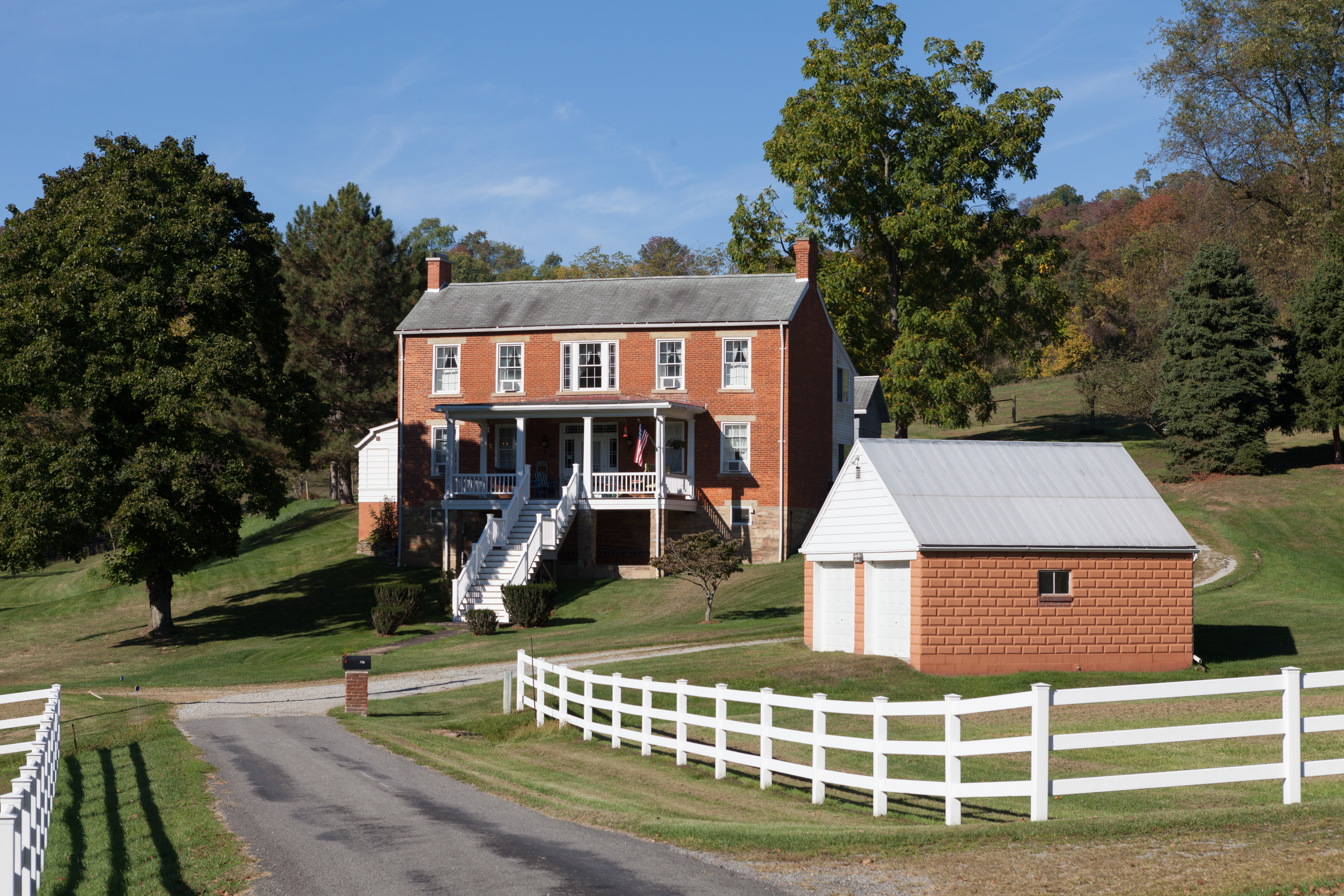
- The farm house in September 2014

- Location within Pennsylvania Location within the United States
- Location: 208 Laurel Road, south of Waynesburg, Franklin Township, Pennsylvania
- Coordinates: 39°52′24″N 80°10′00″W
- Area: 102 acres (41 ha)
- Built: c. 1851
- Architectural style: Greek Revival
- NRHP reference No.: 00000882
- Added to NRHP: August 16, 2000

Thomas Kent Jr. Farm is a historic home and farm located at Franklin Township in Greene County, Pennsylvania. The house was built about 1851, and is a 2 1/2-story, brick dwelling with a 2-story rear ell in the Greek Revival style. It measures 43 feet by 36 feet. Also on the property are the contributing frame barn (c. 1850), corn crib (c. 1850), shed (c. 1920), two car garage (c. 1928), and pond (c. 1928).

It was listed on the National Register of Historic Places in 2000.
