= Hanna Hall (Waynesburg University) =

- U.S. National Register of Historic Places
- U.S. Historic district – Contributing property
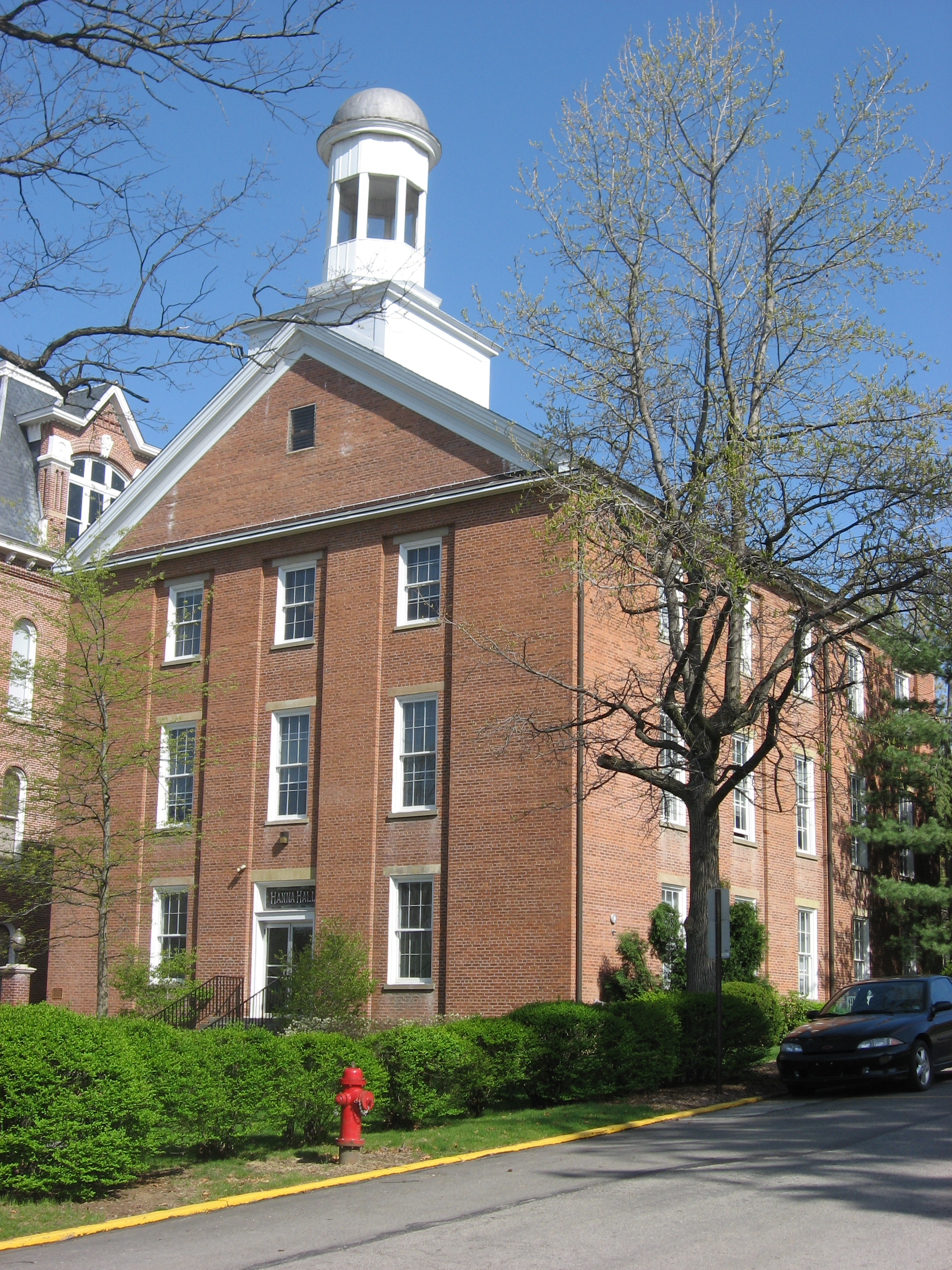
- Hanna Hall, April 2010

- Location within Pennsylvania Location within the United States
- Location: College St., Waynesburg, Pennsylvania
- Coordinates: 39°53′58″N 80°11′13″W
- Area: 0.3 acres (0.12 ha)
- Built: 1851
- Architectural style: Federal
- NRHP reference No.: 79002235
- Added to NRHP: April 18, 1979

Hanna Hall is an historic building which is located on the campus of Waynesburg University in Waynesburg in Greene County, Pennsylvania.

Included as part of the Waynesburg Historic District, it was listed on the National Register of Historic Places in 1979.

== History and architectural features ==
Situated directly to the east of Miller Hall, Hanna Hall was built in 1851, and is a three-story, rectangular red brick building, which was designed in the Federal-style. It has a gable roof topped by a wooden bell tower.

It was named for Reverend William Hanna in 1896. The building has housed offices, classrooms, an elementary school, and dormitory.
