= Greene Hills Farm =

Historic house in Pennsylvania, United States

- U.S. National Register of Historic Places
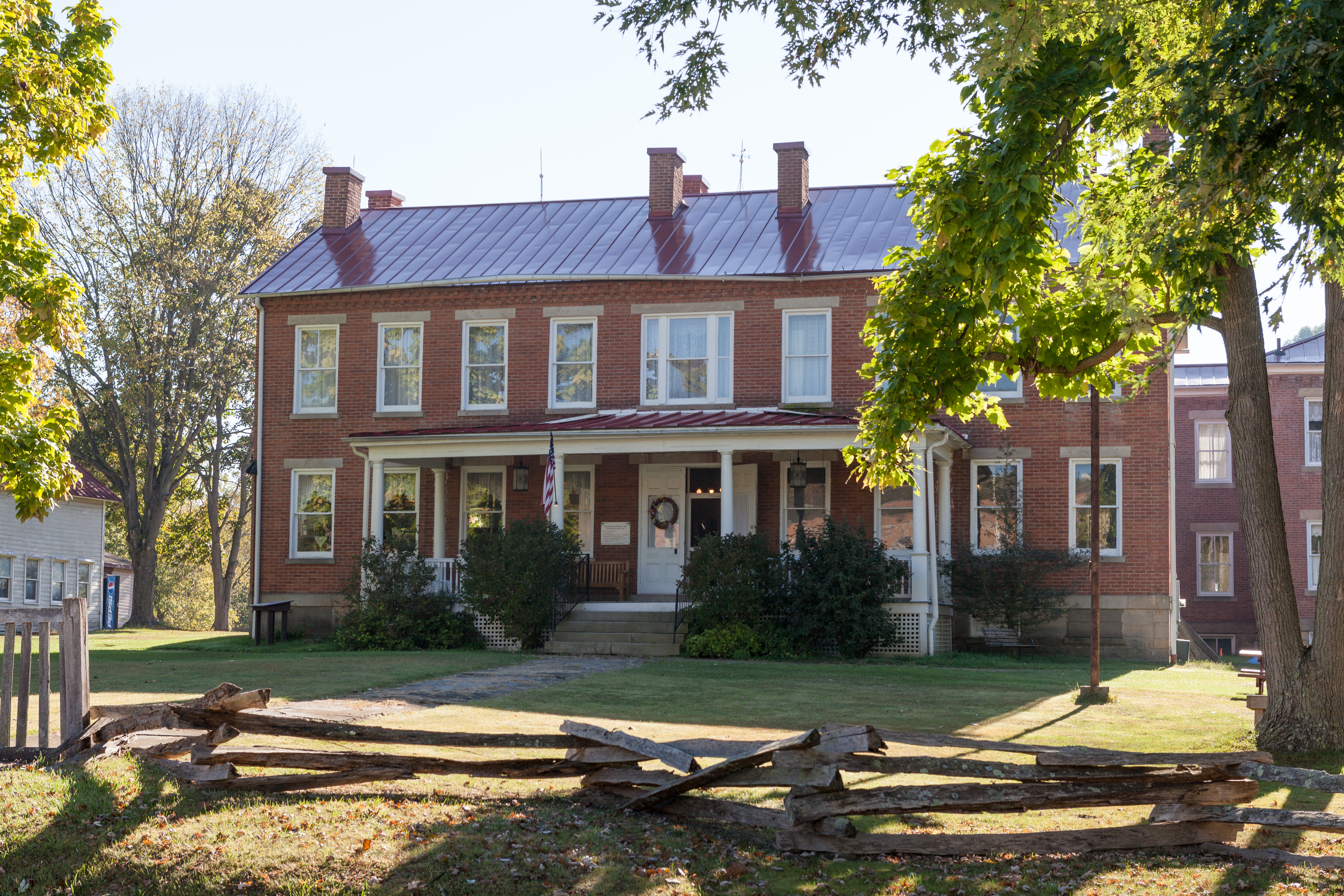
- The original section in September 2014

- Location within Pennsylvania Location within the United States
- Location: 3.5 miles (5.6 km) east of Waynesburg on Pennsylvania Route 21, Franklin Township, Pennsylvania
- Coordinates: 39°53′20″N 80°7′29″W
- Area: 5 acres (2.0 ha)
- Built: 1861
- Architectural style: Late Georgian
- NRHP reference No.: 73001634
- Added to NRHP: April 23, 1973

The Greene Hills Farm, also known as the Greene County Historical Society Museum, is an historic home which is located in Franklin Township in Greene County, Pennsylvania.

It was listed on the National Register of Historic Places in 1973.

== History and architectural features ==
Built in 1861, the farmhouse is a two-and-one-half-story, nine-bay by four-bay, brick dwelling with a gable roof that was designed in the Georgian style. It was expanded in the 1880s with a two-and-one-half-story, brick addition with a gable roof. Another two-and-one-half-story addition was built sometime around 1900.

A county home for the aged from the 1880s through 1964, when it closed, the building was renovated starting in 1969, in order to house the Greene County Historical Society Museum's collection and library.
