= Waynesburg, Pennsylvania =

Borough in Pennsylvania, US

- Borough
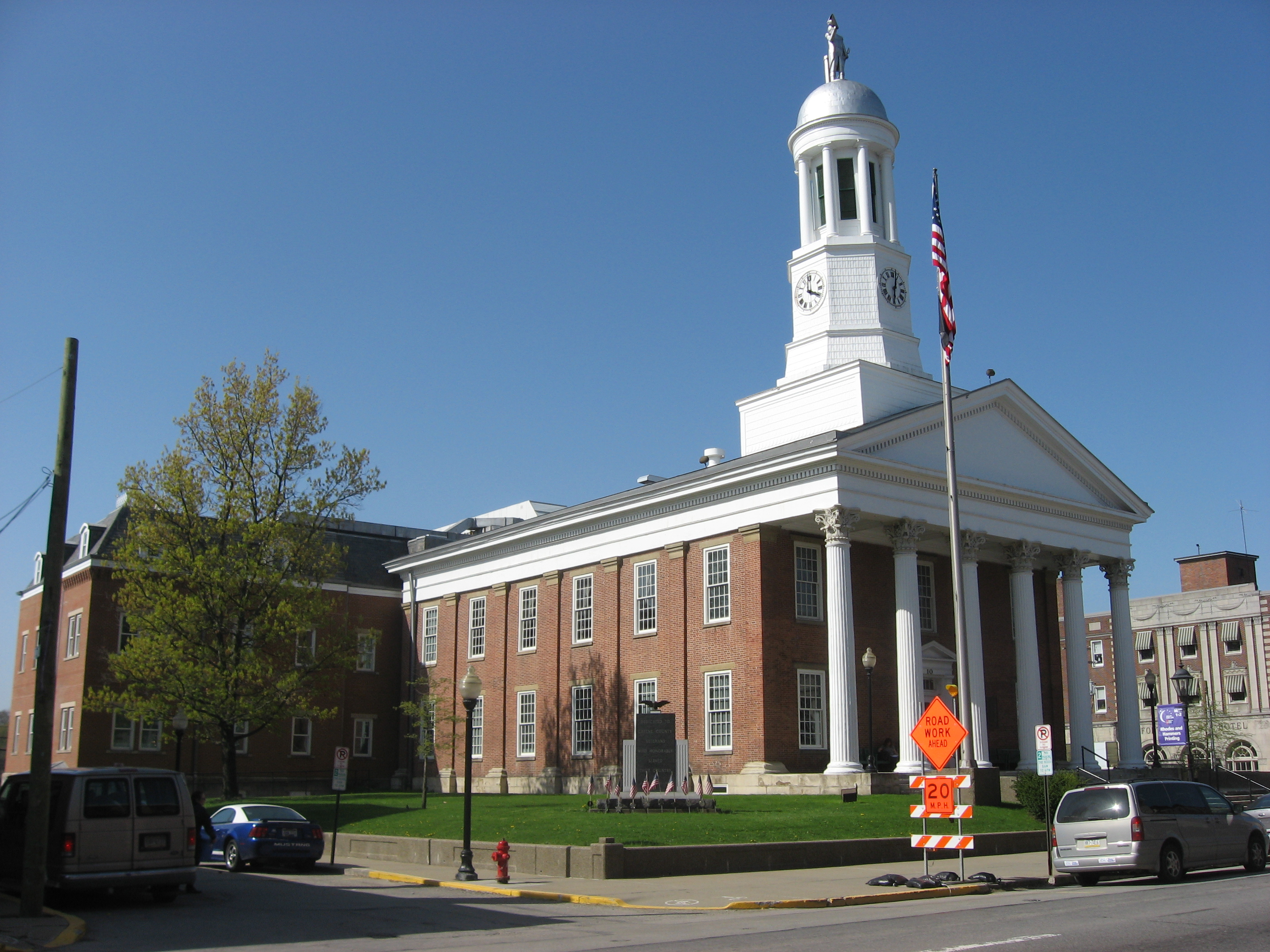
- Greene County Courthouse in downtown Waynesburg

- Seal
- Etymology: Anthony Wayne
- Location of Waynesburg in Greene County, Pennsylvania.

- Location within Pennsylvania Location within the United States
- Coordinates: 39°53′47″N 80°11′11″W
- Country: United States
- State: Pennsylvania
- County: Greene
- Established: 1796

Government
  - Mayor: Lynn Bussey

Area
  - Total: 0.80 sq mi (2.08 km^{2})
  - Land: 0.80 sq mi (2.08 km^{2})
  - Water: 0 sq mi (0.00 km^{2})
- Elevation: 1,034 ft (315 m)

Population (2020)
  - Total: 4,001
  - Estimate (2023): 3,728
  - Density: 4,976/sq mi (1,921.4/km^{2})
- Time zone: UTC-4 (EST)
  - Summer (DST): UTC-5 (EDT)
- ZIP Code: 15370
- Area codes: 724, 878
- FIPS code: 42-059-81832
- Website: waynesburgboro.com

Waynesburg is a borough in Greene County, Pennsylvania, United States, and its county seat. The population was 4,001 at the 2020 census. It is located about 50 miles (80 km) south of Pittsburgh.

The region around Waynesburg is underlaid with several layers of coking coal, including the Pittsburgh No. 8 seam, the Waynesburg seam, and the Sewickley (Mapletown) seam. The area is also rich with coalbed methane, which is being developed from the underlying Marcellus Shale, the largest domestic natural gas reserve. Early in the 20th century, four large gas compressing stations and a steam shovel factory were located in Waynesburg.

Waynesburg is named for General "Mad" Anthony Wayne, one of the top lieutenants of George Washington during the Revolutionary War (1776–81). The borough is the location of Waynesburg University, and it is served by the Greene County Airport.

== History ==
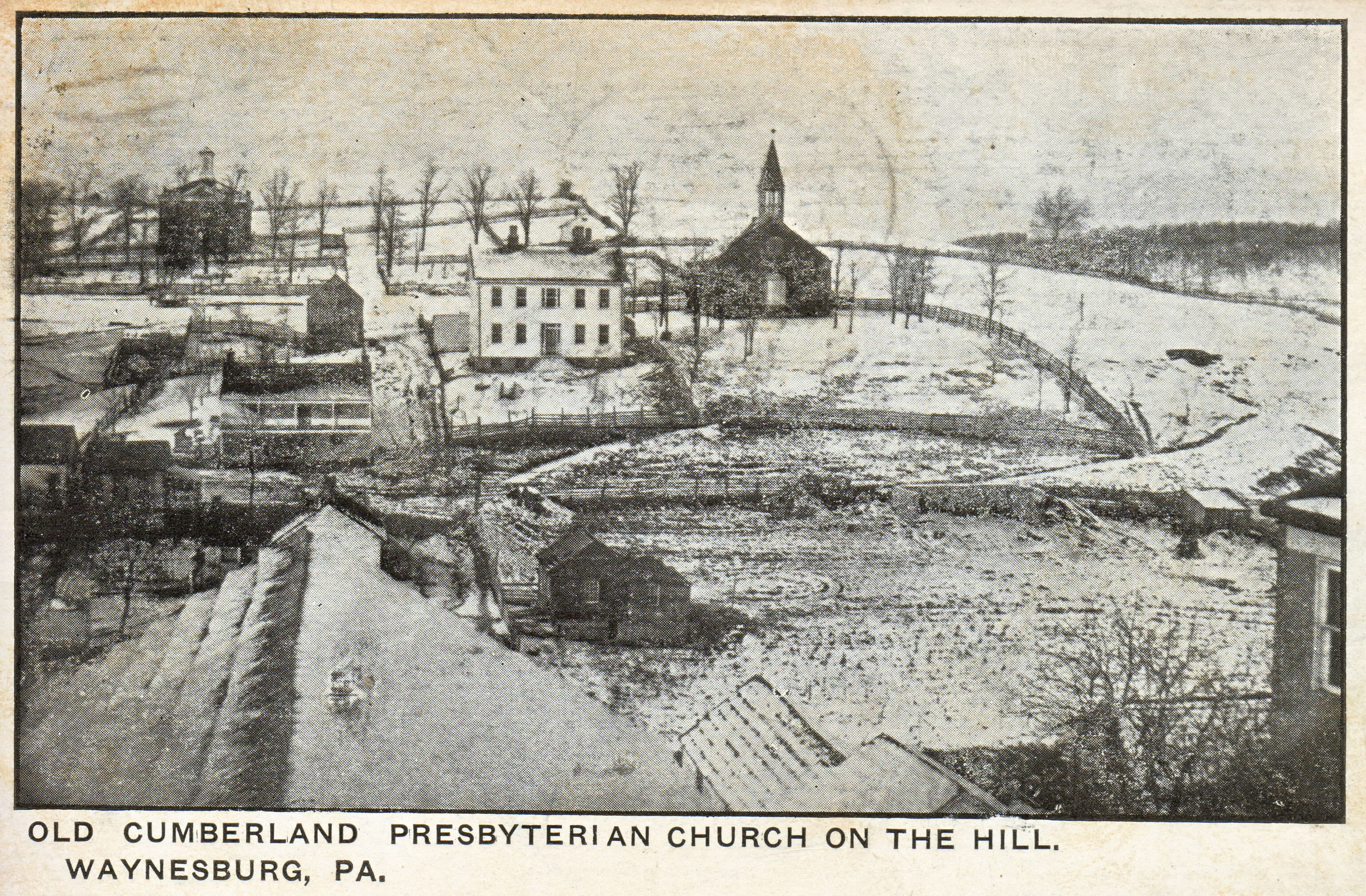
Waynesburg c. 1865, showing the Union School (upper left) and the Old Cumberland Presbyterian Church (upper right)

In 1796, the Pennsylvania General Assembly passed legislation to create Greene County, dividing Washington County into two parts with the lower part becoming Greene County. Part of the legislation required a city to take the county seat for the section of land. They chose Waynesburg as the place for the county seat because it was in the center of the county. Thomas Slater owned the land which is now Waynesburg. According to the Living Places website, Slater purchased the land from a Native American for a two-year-old heifer and a flint-lock rifle. In that time, land development required a patent from William Penn. The town at that time was referred to as Eden, named after his wife Elanor's maiden name, according to the Angel Fire website. County commissioners bought the 158 acres of land from Slater for $2,376 for the purpose of building a jail, courthouse and other public buildings. The commissioners changed the name to Waynesburg, after Revolutionary War General Anthony Wayne. Despite selling the land, though, Slater remained in the area. He lived next to the Waynesburg VFW where two trailers now sit. Slater lived in his house until his death in 1815 at the age of 76. The state legislature incorporated Waynesburg as a borough effective April 9, 1816. In August 1875 construction began of the 3 ft (914 mm) narrow gauge Waynesburg and Washington Railroad, conceived by John Day in 1874 and chartered in 1875. Its passenger service ended in 1929, and conversion to 4 ft 8 1/2 in (1,435 mm) standard gauge followed in 1944 as a wartime measure. Then the railroad was renamed the Waynesburg Secondary Railroad. Regular freight service ended on this line in 1976, though part of it still serves (irregularly) for railroad access to a coal mine.

The Waynesburg Historic District, Hanna Hall at the university, and Miller Hall are listed on the National Register of Historic Places.

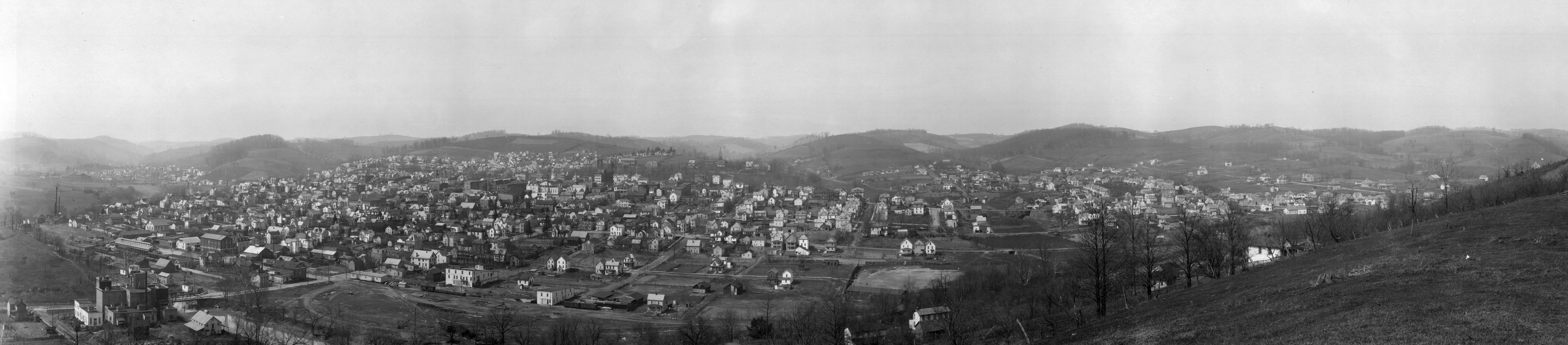
Waynesburg, c. 1905

== Geography ==
Waynesburg is located northeast of the center of Greene County at 39°53′51″N 80°11′8″W (39.897403, -80.185597). Its southern boundary follows the South Fork of Tenmile Creek, an east-flowing tributary of the Monongahela River. The borough is surrounded by Franklin Township, a separate municipality.

U.S. Route 19 passes through the center of the borough as High Street (westbound) and Greene Street (eastbound), turning on the north side of town to follow Morris Street (northbound) and Richhill Street (southbound). Pennsylvania Route 21 joins US 19 through downtown Waynesburg on High and Greene streets. PA 21 leads east 2 miles (3 km) to Interstate 79 at Exit 14 and continues east another 25 miles (40 km) to Uniontown. To the west PA 21 leads 6 miles (9.7 km) to Rogersville and 24 miles (39 km) to the West Virginia border. I-79 leads north from Exit 14 21 miles (34 km) to Washington and 53 miles (85 km) to Pittsburgh, while Morgantown, West Virginia, is 24 miles (39 km) to the south.

According to the United States Census Bureau, Waynesburg has a total area of 0.80 square miles (2.07 km^{2}), all land.

=== Climate ===
Climate data for Waynesburg, Pennsylvania (1991–2020 normals, extremes 1922–present)
Month	Jan	Feb	Mar	Apr	May	Jun	Jul	Aug	Sep	Oct	Nov	Dec	Year
Record high °F (°C)	76 (24)	78 (26)	85 (29)	90 (32)	92 (33)	99 (37)	102 (39)	101 (38)	100 (38)	90 (32)	84 (29)	77 (25)	102 (39)
Mean daily maximum °F (°C)	38.5 (3.6)	41.6 (5.3)	50.9 (10.5)	63.8 (17.7)	72.8 (22.7)	79.8 (26.6)	83.4 (28.6)	82.4 (28.0)	76.8 (24.9)	65.2 (18.4)	53.1 (11.7)	42.8 (6.0)	62.6 (17.0)
Daily mean °F (°C)	29.0 (−1.7)	31.2 (−0.4)	39.1 (3.9)	50.1 (10.1)	59.9 (15.5)	67.9 (19.9)	71.9 (22.2)	70.6 (21.4)	64.1 (17.8)	52.4 (11.3)	41.7 (5.4)	33.7 (0.9)	51.0 (10.6)
Mean daily minimum °F (°C)	19.4 (−7.0)	20.8 (−6.2)	27.2 (−2.7)	36.4 (2.4)	46.9 (8.3)	56.0 (13.3)	60.4 (15.8)	58.8 (14.9)	51.4 (10.8)	39.6 (4.2)	30.3 (−0.9)	24.7 (−4.1)	39.3 (4.1)
Record low °F (°C)	−25 (−32)	−16 (−27)	−8 (−22)	9 (−13)	19 (−7)	29 (−2)	38 (3)	34 (1)	24 (−4)	13 (−11)	−3 (−19)	−16 (−27)	−25 (−32)
Average precipitation inches (mm)	3.42 (87)	2.84 (72)	3.74 (95)	3.38 (86)	4.34 (110)	4.17 (106)	4.31 (109)	3.88 (99)	3.51 (89)	3.25 (83)	2.94 (75)	3.29 (84)	43.07 (1,094)
Average snowfall inches (cm)	9.5 (24)	8.1 (21)	5.6 (14)	0.4 (1.0)	0.0 (0.0)	0.0 (0.0)	0.0 (0.0)	0.0 (0.0)	0.0 (0.0)	0.2 (0.51)	0.7 (1.8)	5.6 (14)	30.1 (76)
Average precipitation days (≥ 0.01 in)	15.2	13.1	13.1	13.5	14.4	13.1	11.4	11.0	10.3	11.3	11.7	14.2	152.3
Average snowy days (≥ 0.1 in)	7.7	6.2	3.6	0.6	0.0	0.0	0.0	0.0	0.0	0.1	1.0	5.3	24.5
Source: NOAA

== Demographics ==
Historical population
Census	Pop.	Note	%±
1820	298		—
1830	518		73.8%
1840	597		15.3%
1850	852		42.7%
1860	1,054		23.7%
1870	1,272		20.7%
1880	1,208		−5.0%
1890	2,101		73.9%
1900	2,544		21.1%
1910	3,545		39.3%
1920	3,332		−6.0%
1930	4,915		47.5%
1940	4,891		−0.5%
1950	5,514		12.7%
1960	5,188		−5.9%
1970	5,152		−0.7%
1980	4,482		−13.0%
1990	4,270		−4.7%
2000	4,184		−2.0%
2010	4,176		−0.2%
2020	4,006		−4.1%
2025 (est.)	3,631	▼	−9.4%

=== 2020 census ===
As of the 2020 census, Waynesburg had a population of 4,006. The median age was 28.1 years. 18.1% of residents were under the age of 18 and 13.2% of residents were 65 years of age or older. For every 100 females there were 92.6 males, and for every 100 females age 18 and over there were 90.5 males age 18 and over.

100.0% of residents lived in urban areas, while 0.0% lived in rural areas.

There were 1,404 households in Waynesburg, of which 25.9% had children under the age of 18 living in them. Of all households, 34.3% were married-couple households, 23.9% were households with a male householder and no spouse or partner present, and 33.0% were households with a female householder and no spouse or partner present. About 39.2% of all households were made up of individuals and 15.6% had someone living alone who was 65 years of age or older.

There were 1,715 housing units, of which 18.1% were vacant. The homeowner vacancy rate was 2.8% and the rental vacancy rate was 13.2%.

Racial composition as of the 2020 census
Race	Number	Percent
White	3,674	91.7%
Black or African American	83	2.1%
American Indian and Alaska Native	6	0.1%
Asian	32	0.8%
Native Hawaiian and Other Pacific Islander	3	0.1%
Some other race	50	1.2%
Two or more races	158	3.9%
Hispanic or Latino (of any race)	100	2.5%

=== 2000 census ===
As of the 2000 census, there were 4,184 people, 1,619 households, and 869 families residing in the borough. The population density was 5,038.6 inhabitants per square mile (1,945.4/km^{2}). There were 1,811 housing units at an average density of 2,180.9 per square mile (842.1/km^{2}). The racial makeup of the borough was 96.94% White, 1.63% African American, 0.10% Native American, 0.57% Asian, 0.05% Pacific Islander, 0.17% from other races, and 0.55% from two or more races. Hispanic or Latino of any race were 0.65% of the population.

There were 1,619 households, out of which 24.1% had children under the age of 18 living with them, 38.4% were married couples living together, 11.6% had a female householder with no husband present, and 46.3% were non-families. 38.2% of all households were made up of individuals, and 16.7% had someone living alone who was 65 years of age or older. The average household size was 2.24 and the average family size was 2.99.

In the borough the population was spread out, with 18.6% under the age of 18, 24.2% from 18 to 24, 24.8% from 25 to 44, 17.8% from 45 to 64, and 14.5% who were 65 years of age or older. The median age was 30 years. For every 100 females there were 97.5 males. For every 100 females age 18 and over, there were 97.4 males.

The median income for a household in the borough was $30,990, and the median income for a family was $42,933. Males had a median income of $31,577 versus $22,458 for females. The per capita income for the borough was $15,333. About 8.0% of families and 13.0% of the population were below the poverty line, including 10.5% of those under age 18 and 11.7% of those age 65 or over.

== Prisons ==
The SCI-Greene prison, operated by the Pennsylvania Department of Corrections, is located in Franklin Township, near Waynesburg.

A state prison site was located in Morgan Township, near Waynesburg; originally it was a juvenile prison operated by the Pennsylvania Department of Public Welfare. This became the PADOC State Correctional Institution – Waynesburg, an adult prison, in 1984. It closed in 2003, and the land was sold to Basalt Trap Rock Co.

== Education ==
Its school district is Central Greene School District.

The Eva K. Bowlby Public Library is on Bowlby Street (originally named North Richill Street), in the former Bowlby family home. It was bequeathed by Mrs Bowlby, a prominent local citizen who died in 1957, to serve as a children's library.

The borough is also home to Waynesburg University.

== Notable people ==
- Mary Temple Bayard (1853–1916), writer, journalist
- Arthur I. Boreman, first governor of West Virginia, left Waynesburg at the age of four
- Todd Tamanend Clark, poet and composer, lived in Waynesburg from 1965 to 1970
- Bill George, linebacker for the Chicago Bears and the Los Angeles Rams
- Greg Hopkins, Arena Football League player who played high school football in Waynesburg
- Josh Koscheck, mixed martial artist
- Edward Martin, Republican governor and senator for Pennsylvania
- Dave Palone, harness racing driver
- Rittz, rapper on Tech N9ne's record label Strange Music
- Coleman Scott, 2012 London Olympic bronze medalist in freestyle wrestling
- Sarah Rush, American actress, best known in television for her work in the original Battlestar Galactica.
- Scott Orndoff, American football player
