= Bonner Foundation =

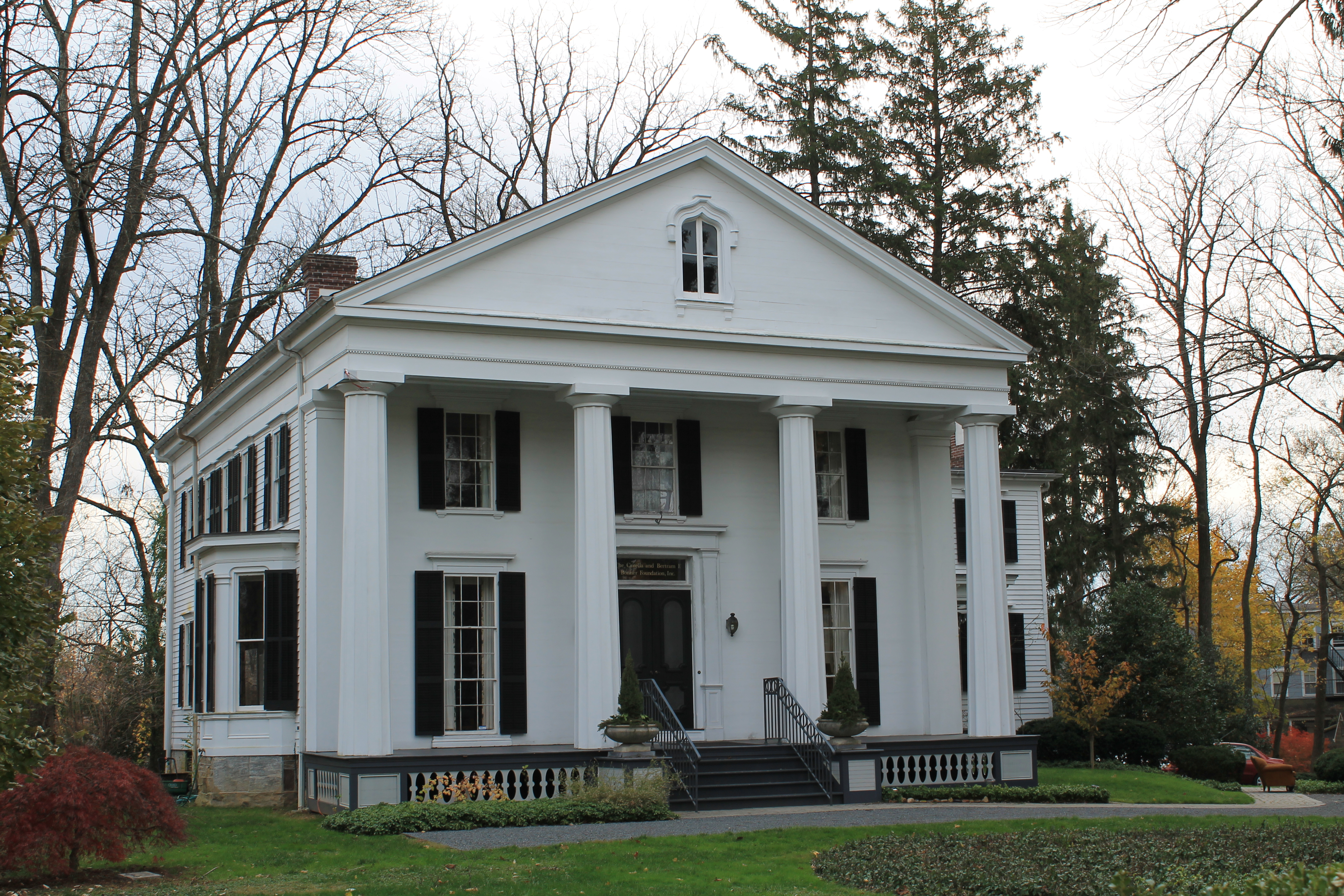
10 Mercer Street, home of the Bonner Foundation

The Bonner Foundation was founded by Corella and Bertram F. Bonner in 1988. The Bonner Foundation supports two programs; The Bonner Program and the Crisis Ministry Program.

The Crisis Ministry Program provides grant funds to combat hunger, primarily with local organizations in Central New Jersey and a few additional communities of interest.

The Bonner Program began with in 1990 with the Bonner Scholar Program at Berea College and now has 21 participating schools. The Bonner Scholar Program provides scholarship money that allows students who would otherwise be working part-time to invest the same amount of time in community service. The foundation later created the Bonner Leaders program in order to engage additional student leaders. The Bonner Leader Program replicates the Bonner Scholars Program with schools using their own funding sources, including Federal Work-Study. Currently the program supports over 3,000 students annually at over 65 campuses.

== Background on the Leadership and their role in the history of campus-based community service ==
The Bonner Foundation was founded by Bertram F. Bonner and Corella Allen Bonner. Wayne Meisel was the first president of the organization. Meisel began his role in 1989 and retired as president in 2010. Robert Hackett currently serves as the organization's president.

Meisel founded the Campus Outreach Opportunity League (COOL), a national organization that promotes and supports college student involvement in community service and social action. One of the signature programs of COOL has been its annual national conference on student community service. Although COOL was merged into idealist.org in 2004, the conference has continued. In 2007, idealist.org discontinued its On Campus Programs, what it had acquired through COOL. However, the national conference continues as an independent volunteer-driven effort. The Bonner Foundation and its participating campuses continue to be active participants and contributors to the successor annual conference known as the IMPACT Conference.
