= Greene County Airport (Pennsylvania) =

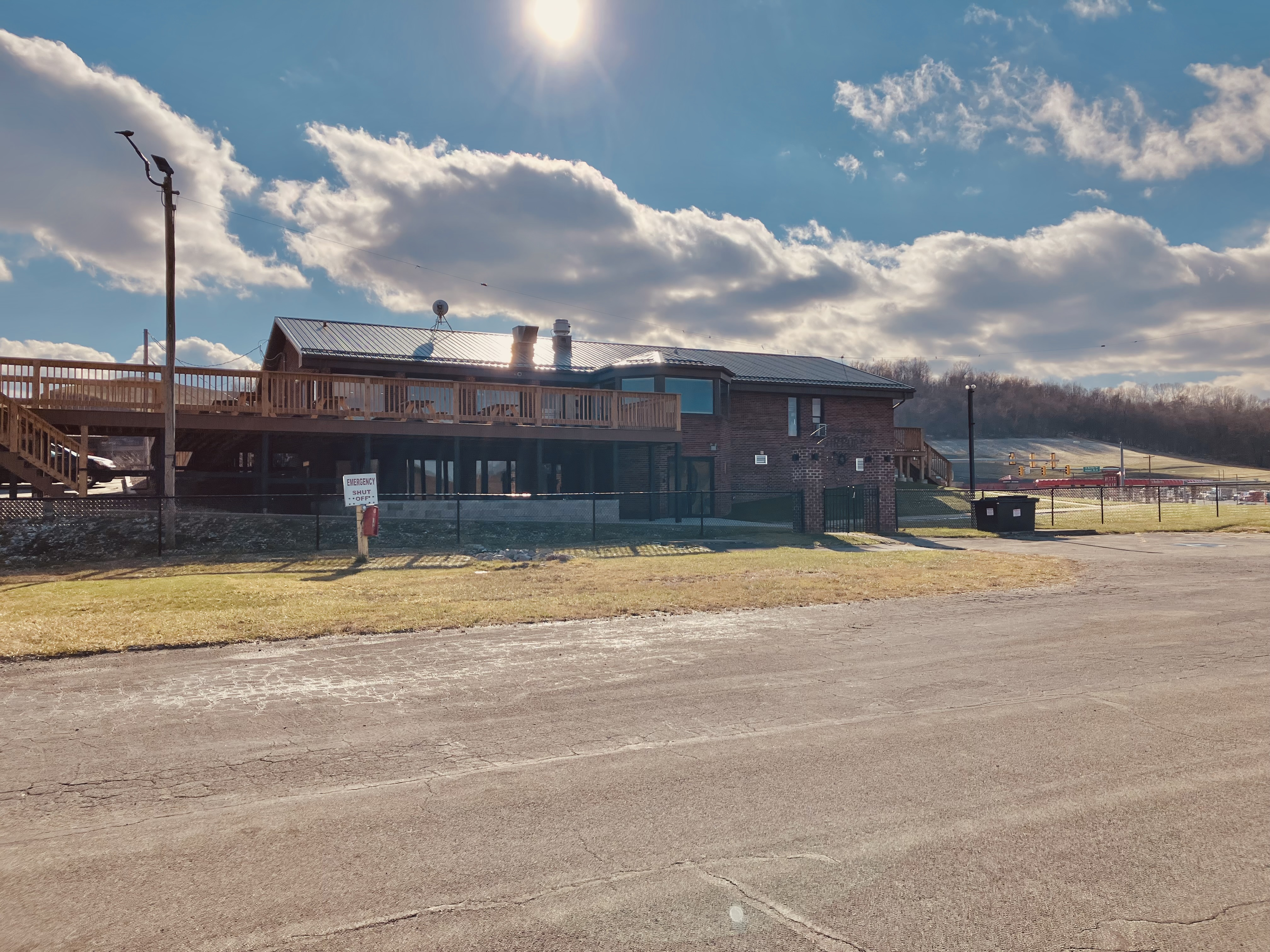
- Airport management office
- IATA: WAY; ICAO: KWAY; FAA LID: WAY

Summary
- Airport type: Public
- Owner: Greene County
- Serves: Greene County, Pennsylvania (including Waynesburg)
- Location: Franklin Township, Greene County, Pennsylvania
- Elevation AMSL: 1,069 ft (326 m)
- Coordinates: 39°54′04″N 080°07′50″W
- Website: Official website

Maps
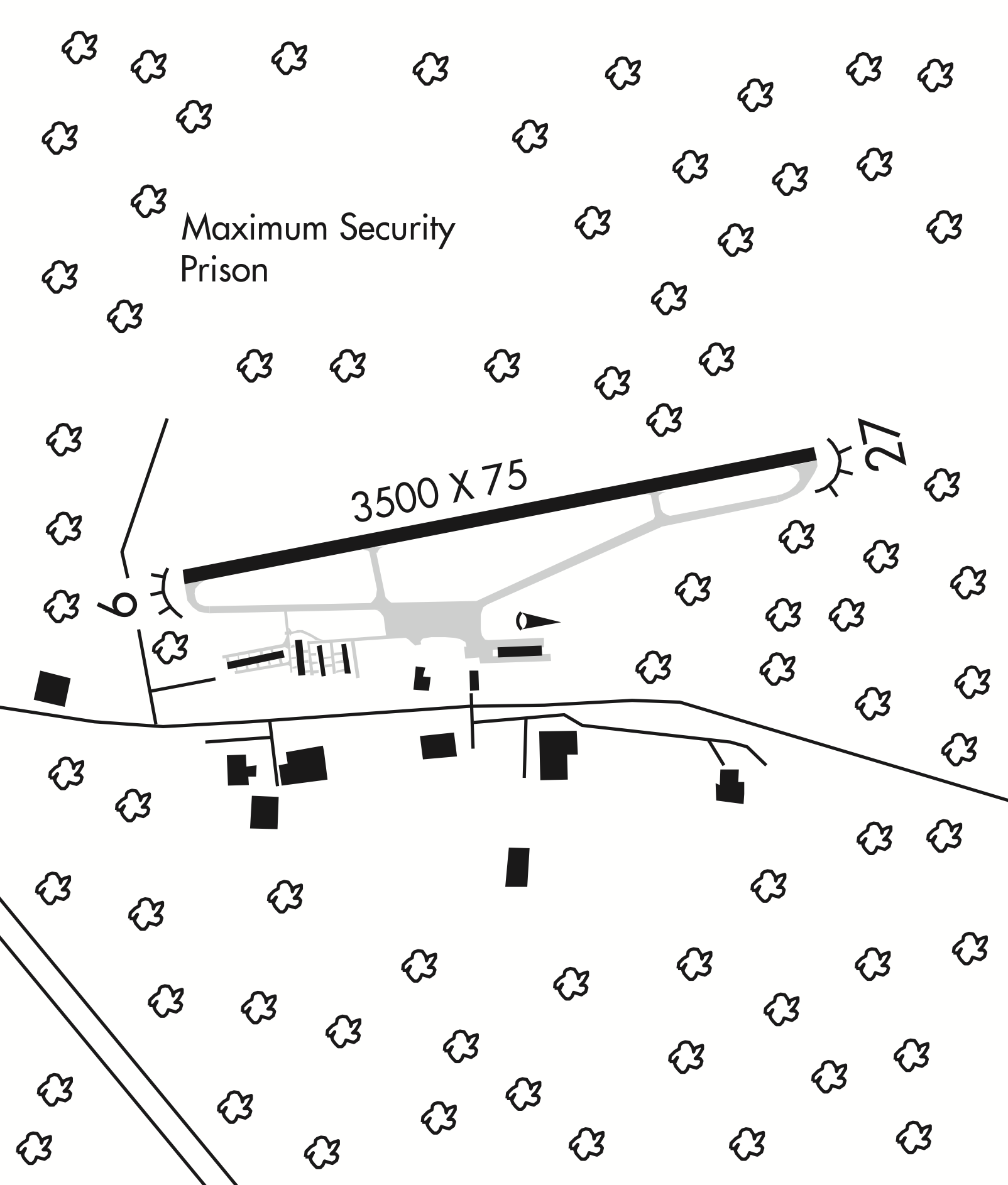

- Location of airport in Pennsylvania WAY (the United States)

Runways
Direction	Length		Surface
Direction	ft	m	Surface
9/27	3,500	1,067	Asphalt

Statistics (2011)
- Aircraft operations: 13,909
- Based aircraft: 25
- Source: Federal Aviation Administration

The Greene County Airport (IATA: WAY, ICAO: KWAY, FAA LID: WAY) is a county-owned, public-use airport in Franklin Township, Greene County, Pennsylvania, United States. It is located two nautical miles (4 km) east of the central business district of Waynesburg, Pennsylvania. This airport was included in the National Plan of Integrated Airport Systems for 2009–2013, which categorized it as a general aviation facility.

== History ==
The airport opened in December 1937. The main runway was paved in 1958.

== Facilities and aircraft ==
Greene County Airport covers an area of 89 acres (36 ha) at an elevation of 1,069 feet (326 m) above mean sea level. It has one runway designated 9/27 with an asphalt surface measuring 3,500 by 75 feet (1,067 x 23 m).

For the twelve-month period ending April 21, 2011, the airport had 13,909 aircraft operations, an average of 38 per day: 99% general aviation, 1% air taxi, and <1% military. At that time, there were 25 aircraft based at this airport: 96% single-engine and 4% ultralight.

== See also ==
- List of airports in Pennsylvania
