= Waynesburg University =

Private university in Waynesburg, Pennsylvania, US

- Former name: Waynesburg College (1850–2007)
- Motto: Latin: Fiat Lux
- Motto in English: Let There Be Light
- Type: Private university
- Established: 1850; 176 years ago
- Religious affiliation: Nondenominational Christianity; formerly informally affiliated with Presbyterian Church (USA)
- President: Douglas G. Lee
- Undergraduates: 1,100
- Location: Waynesburg, Pennsylvania, United States; 39°54′00″N 80°11′15″W
- Campus: Suburban
- Colors: Dark Orange, Black
- Nickname: Yellow Jackets
- Sporting affiliations: NCAA Division III – PAC
- Website: waynesburg.edu
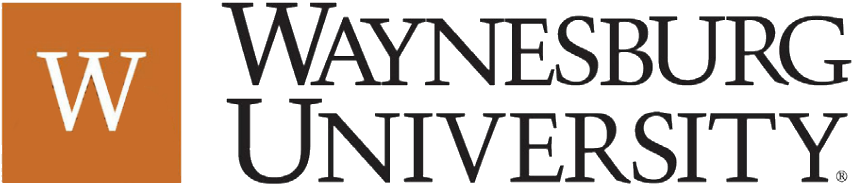

Waynesburg University is a private Christian university in Waynesburg, Pennsylvania, United States. It was established in 1850 and offers undergraduate and graduate programs in more than 70 academic concentrations. The university enrolls around 1,400 students, including approximately 1,100 undergraduates.

== History ==
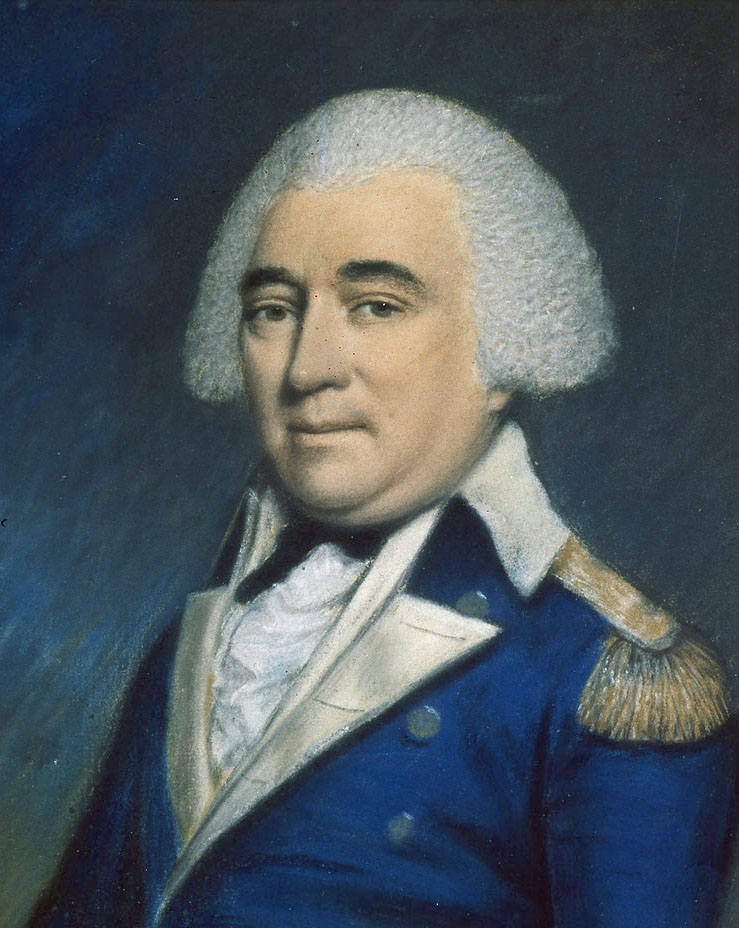
Anthony Wayne, for whom the university was named

In honor of General Anthony Wayne, the university was founded in 1849 as Waynesburg College by the Cumberland Presbyterian Church and was officially established with a charter by the Commonwealth of Pennsylvania in 1850.

Waynesburg University is located on a contemporary campus on the hills of southwestern Pennsylvania, and also has facilities in the Greater Pittsburgh Region. Miller Hall and Hanna Hall are listed on the National Register of Historic Places.

== Academics ==
Waynesburg University offers bachelor's, master's, and doctoral degrees in up to 70 majors and minors. It is accredited by the Middle States Commission on Higher Education.

=== Graduate and professional studies ===
The university offers graduate programs in business, counseling, education, criminal investigation and nursing. The programs are designed to serve the working professional in the Pittsburgh region and beyond via off-campus facilities in the Greater Pittsburgh region.

The Graduate School of Professional Studies offers degrees in athletic training, business, nursing, education, counseling and criminal investigation at the Pittsburgh facilities as well as in Waynesburg and online. The Master of Business Administration (MBA) program (IACBE accredited) is the third largest in the Pittsburgh region. Waynesburg University also offers a Doctoral Program of Nursing Practice (CCNE accredited) and a Ph.D. in Counselor Education and Supervision (CACREP accredited).

=== Stover Center for Constitutional Studies and Moral Leadership ===
Waynesburg University's Stover Center for Constitutional Studies and Moral Leadership, named after W. Robert Stover, brings Stover Constitutional Fellows and other guest speakers to campus and offers an array of experiences to a select group of students designated as Stover Scholars. These experiences include special seminars, visits with state officials, and internships in the fields of government, law, and public policy.

== Facilities ==
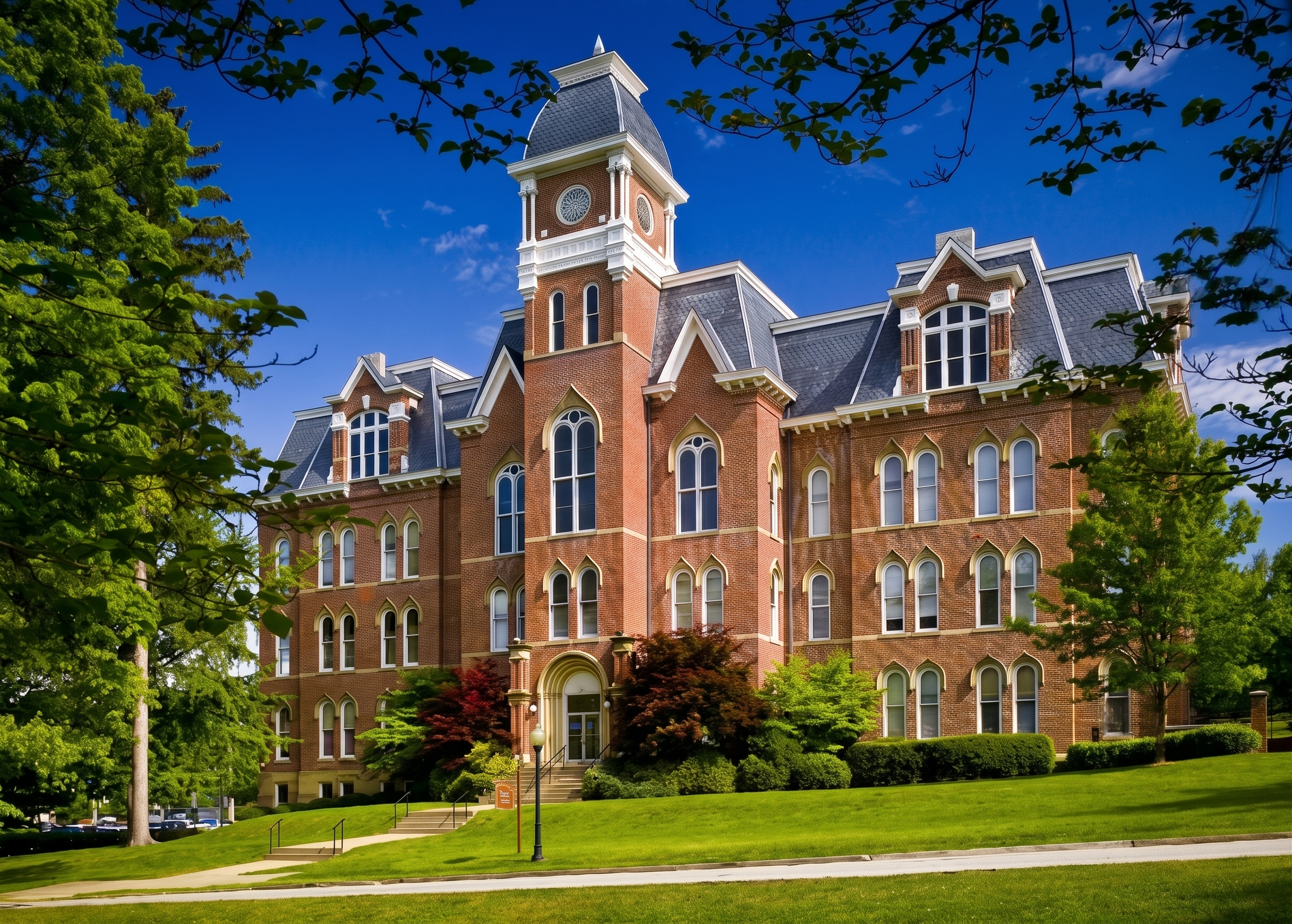
Miller Hall, the university's main building

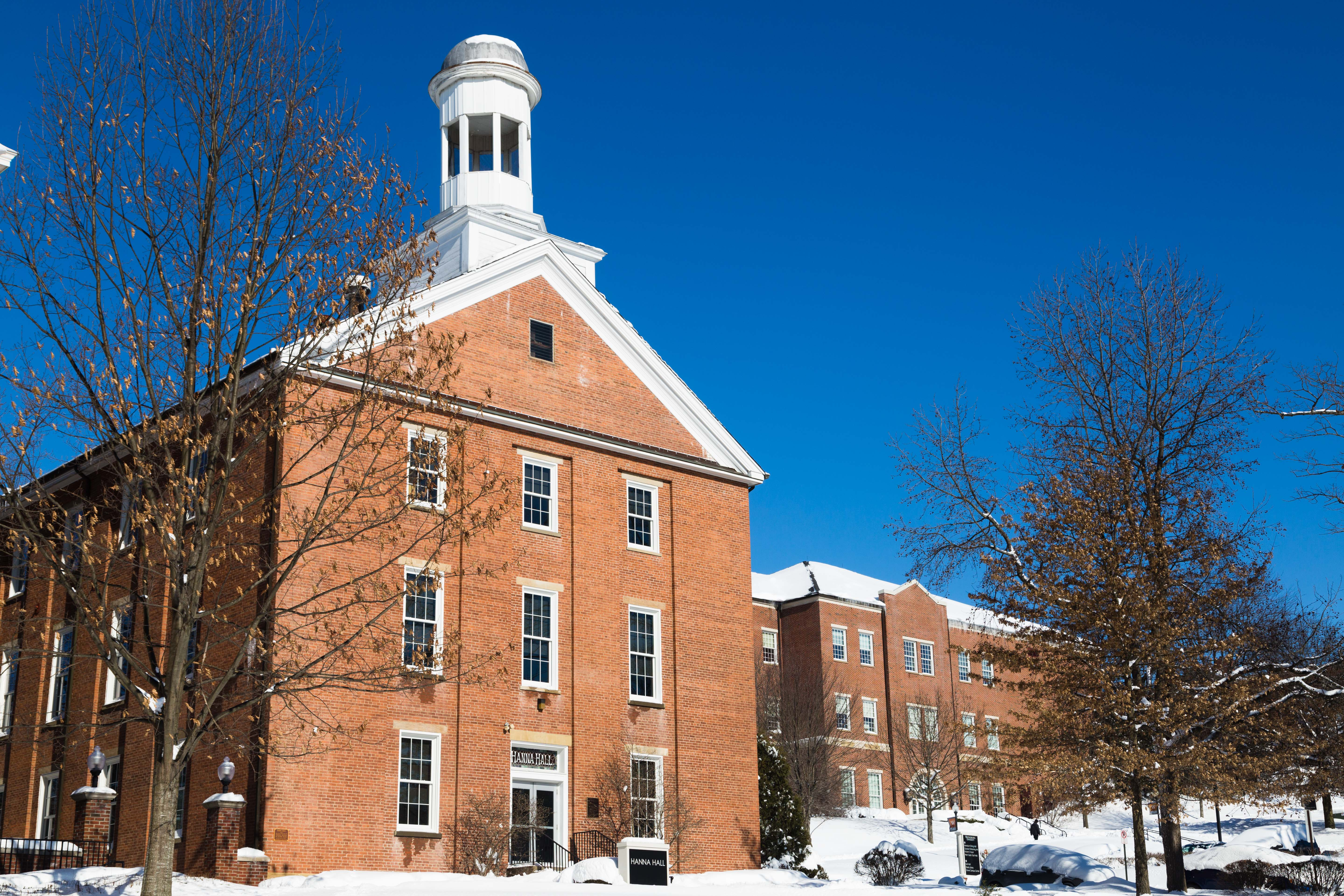
Hanna Hall, the university's oldest building

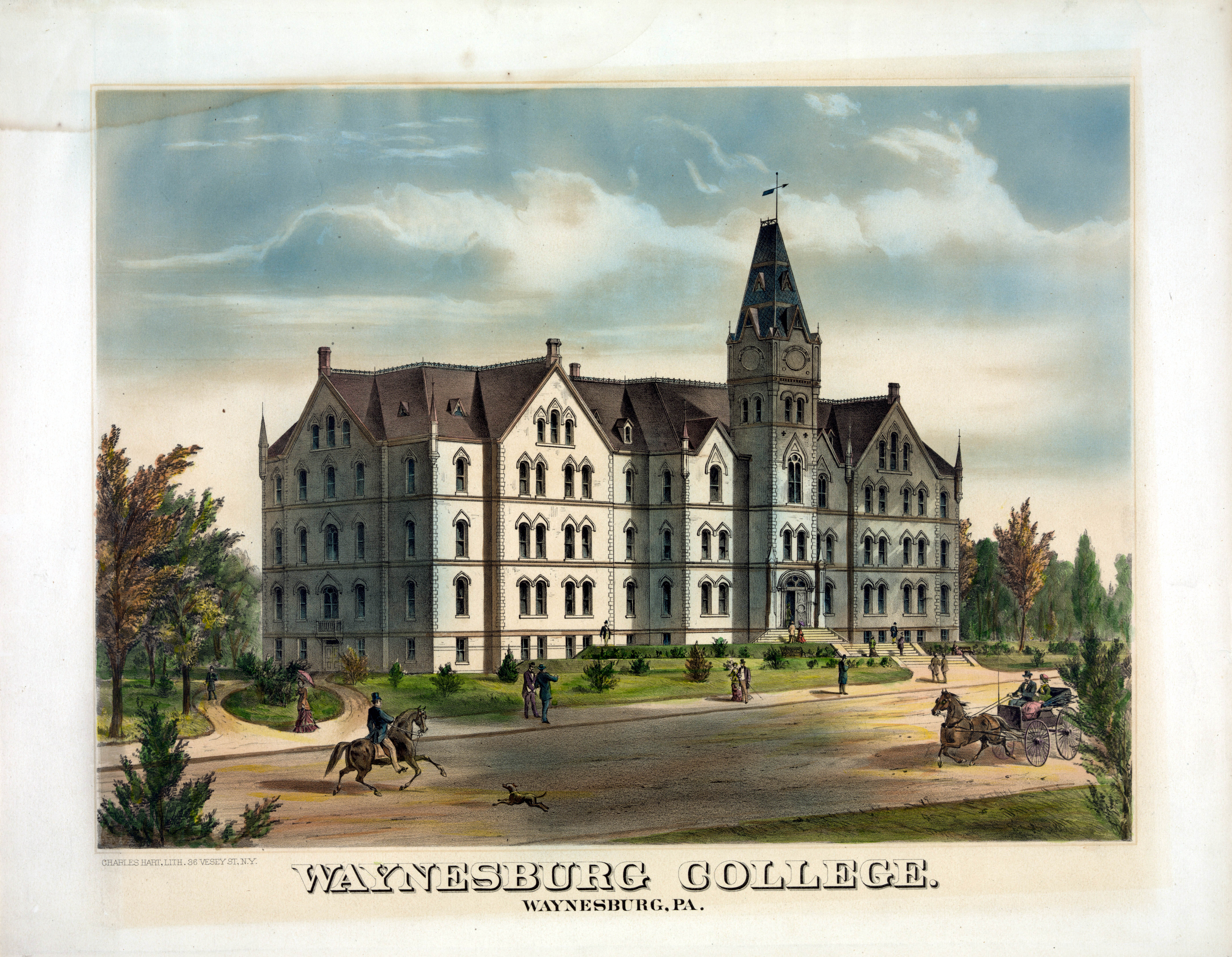
Print of historical Waynesburg University building (at the time: Waynesburg College)

=== University ===
Facilities at Waynesburg University include:

- faculties
- administration offices
- a chapel
- an esports arena
- a performing arts center
- a gym with a basketball and a volleyball court and a wrestling ring
- a library
- a museum
- a laboratory
- a student center
- a dining hall
- residence halls
- a fitness center
- tennis courts
- a baseball field
- a football stadium
- a TV station
- a radio station
- a newspaper agency

=== Parks ===
Waynesburg University is built around four spacious parks owned by the Borough of Waynesburg. The westernmost park, West Park, contains a bridge meandering through the trees; the next park, Ritchie Park, features a gazebo; and the two parks nearest the university center are commonly referred to as the Fountain Park, also known as College Park, and Monument Park. Fountain Park is directly in front of Hanna and Miller Halls, while Monument Park is between Buhl Hall, Stewart Hall, Pollock Hall, and Martin Hall. Monument Park features a statue dedicated to the lives of those from Greene County that were lost in the Civil War. The combined area of the parks is approximately 15 acres.

=== Residence halls ===
Waynesburg University is home to ten campus residence halls, seven women's and three men's halls. Martin and Thayer Halls are home to most of the men on campus. They both are double occupancy halls on the Eastern side of campus. Martin Hall is between Wayne and Franklin Streets, while Thayer Hall is located next to Buhl Hall and the Eberly Library. Willison Hall is the third men's residence hall, which is located close to Downtown Waynesburg, and features suite-style rooms. It is mostly a double-occupancy hall, but students have the option to triple. Willison Hall is six stories tall.

Denny Hall is located directly next to Benedum Dining Hall on the west side of campus. Like Thayer Hall, it has built in desks and cabinets in the wall. Denny Hall is one of three underclassmen women's halls. Across the parking lot overlooking the chapel is Burns Hall, another underclassmen women’s hall. The four upperclass women halls are West, South, East, and Pollock Halls, also known as SWEP. West, South, and East Halls sit above the Stover campus center and the Eberly Library in a small plaza. Pollock Hall is located right between Buhl Hall, one of the classroom buildings, and Thayer Hall.

=== Fitness center ===
The fitness center is two stories. The first floor houses weight lifting and locker rooms. The second floor features cardio workouts.

== Student life ==
=== Yellow Jacket student newspaper ===
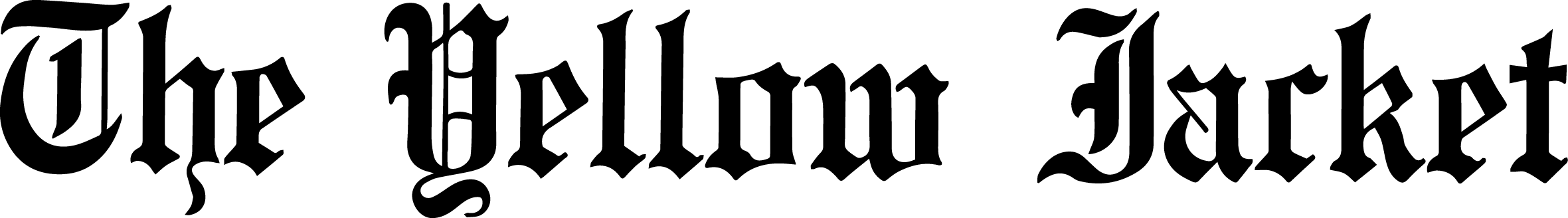
The Yellow Jacket newspaper logo

The Yellow Jacket is the student newspaper for Waynesburg University. The newspaper is produced entirely by Waynesburg University students and is incorporated into many classes within the university's Department of Communication.

The Yellow Jacket features news on campus and community news, student opinion, coverage of the Presidents' Athletic Conference sports teams, and other topics of student or faculty interest. The Yellow Jacket publishes weekly during the academic year in print and online. The newspaper has been published under the Yellow Jacket nameplate since 1924, though student newspapers at Waynesburg University (then Waynesburg College) date back to 1894. Federal Judge John Clark Knox served as the first student editor of the first student newspaper at Waynesburg College. The Yellow Jacket is a member of the Pennsylvania NewsMedia Association and is affiliated with the Waynesburg University student chapter of the Society of Professional Journalists.

The staff of the Yellow Jacket has been recognized numerous times by the Pennsylvania NewsMedia Association's Keystone Awards and the Society of Professional Journalists regional Mark of Excellence Awards.

=== WCYJ-FM ===
WCYJ is a radio station located on the third floor of Buhl Hall. It is run by students and the Waynesburg communications staff. The station plays Adult Contemporary Top-40 hits from the studio at the entry to Buhl, and broadcasts out from the tower located on top of Buhl. The station broadcasts specialty shows, Waynesburg University sports, and local high school football games.

The station's frequency, 99.5 FM, can be heard within the limits of the Waynesburg borough.

Every October the station hosts their largest event, Pumpkin Bowling, in Johnson Commons. Their relay for life event, the 24-hour broadcast, has been steadily growing. Radio staff stays in the radio station for 24 straight hours.

=== WCTV ===
Waynesburg Community Television is operated by students at Waynesburg University. The station is available via the Waynesburg Comcast cable system on channel 14 and online. The studio is located on the 4th floor of Buhl Hall. WCTV broadcasts a variety of student and community oriented programming such as Jacket Sports Weekly, The Buzz, Live at 5 Newscast, Plead Your Case, The Journey and The Waynesburg Effect.

=== Community service ===
Through the Center for Service Leadership, students are connected with organizations according to their field of study. The college community commits over 50,000 hours of service each year to over 50 agencies and community projects. On average, university students perform 1,400 hours of community service a week, both domestically and internationally.

Waynesburg University is one of only 27 Bonner Scholar schools in the country offering local, regional and international opportunities to help others through community service. With support from the Corella and Bertram F. Bonner Foundation, this scholarship program offers selected students financial assistance in return for a commitment to community service while enrolled at Waynesburg.

As a Bonner Scholar school, Waynesburg University:

- Awards 15 new Waynesburg University Bonner Foundation scholarships each academic year.
- Fosters a program with 60 students, who each serve an average of 10 hours per week.

=== Faith ===
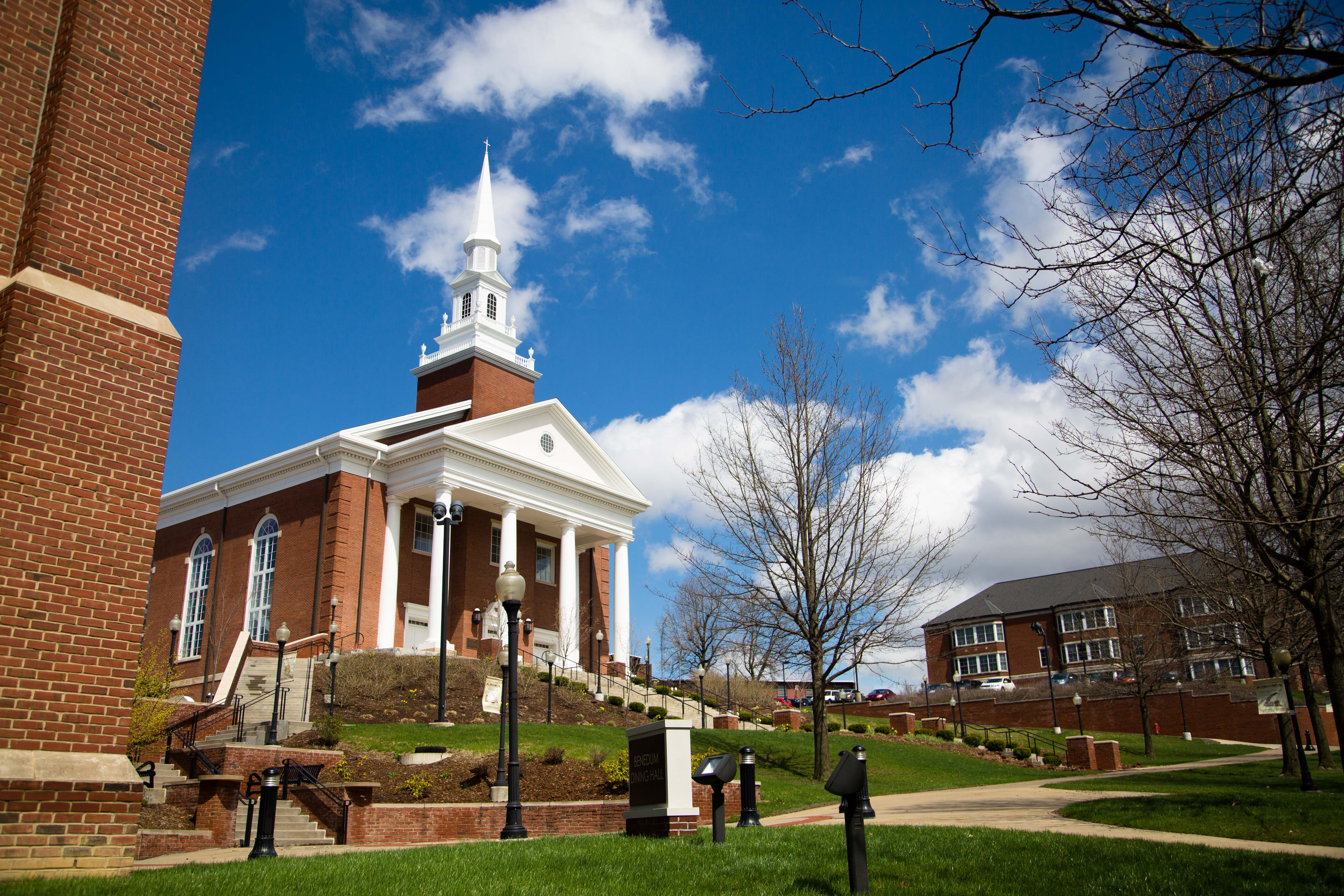
Roberts Chapel

The university emphasizes Christian and community values. Students have the option to participate in:

- Weekly chapel services
- Bible studies
- Contemporary, student-led weekly worship services
- Speakers who engage students to integrate faith, learning and service
- Fellowship of Christian Athletes (FCA)
- Faith and Services Mission Trips

Students may also choose to be involved in various campus ministries: for example, becoming a Christian Ministry Assistant (CMA). CMAs are student leaders who serve the community by creating Bible studies and building student relationships and groups across campus that enhance the mission of Waynesburg University.

=== Study abroad ===
The university offers its students various opportunities to study abroad. For example, students at Waynesburg University may study abroad through the Fulbright program.

== Athletics ==
Waynesburg athletics logo

Waynesburg University teams, known athletically as the Yellow Jackets, compete in the Presidents' Athletic Conference (PAC) of the National Collegiate Athletic Association's (NCAA) Division III. Men's sports include baseball, basketball, cross country, esports, football, golf, soccer, tennis, indoor and outdoor track & field and wrestling; while women's sports include basketball, cross country, esports, golf, soccer, softball, tennis, indoor and outdoor track & field and volleyball.

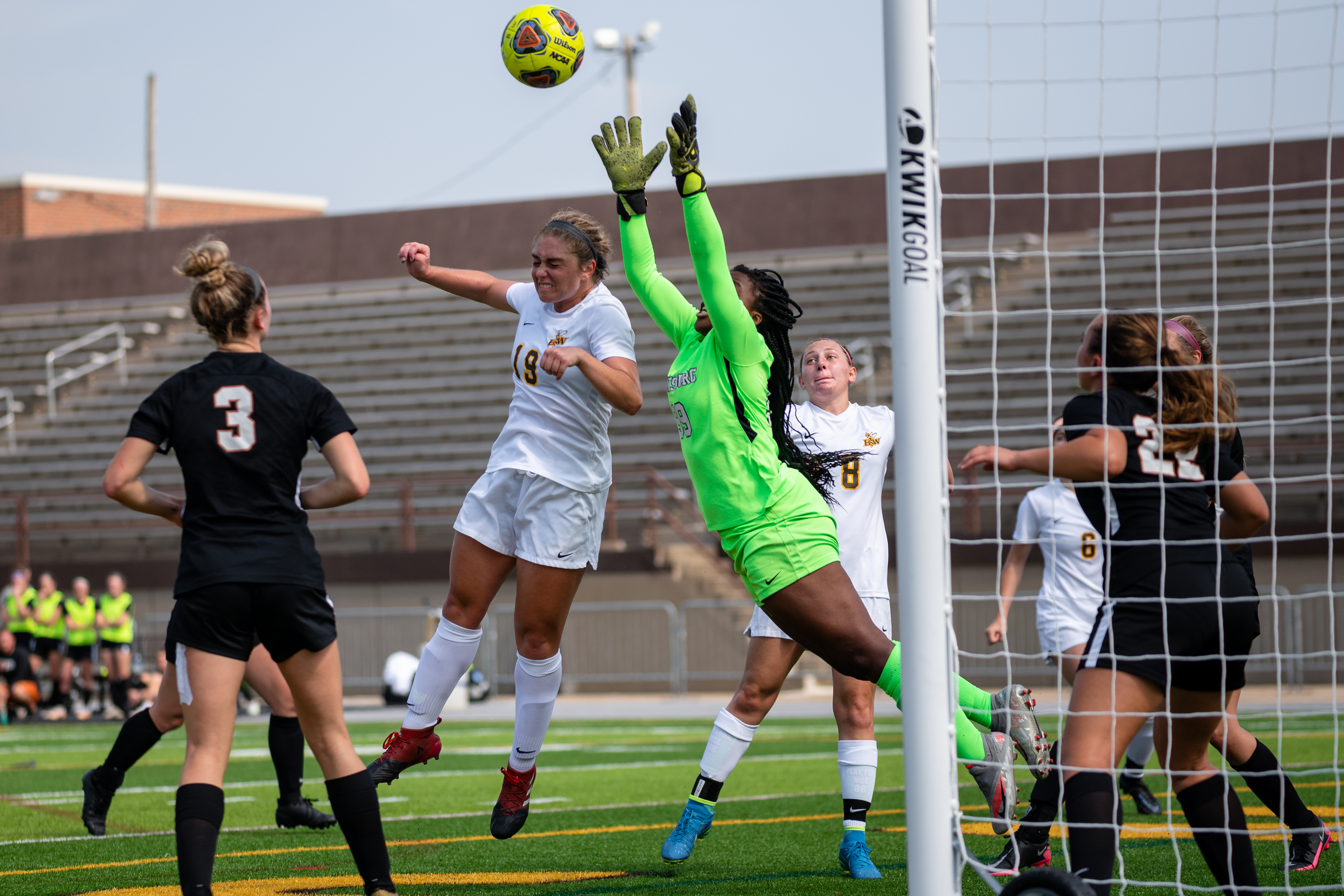
Waynesburg (black kit) v Baldwin Wallace, women's soccer match in 2021

=== Baseball ===
In 1998, the Jacket baseball team defeated Grove City College to capture the PAC championship 5–4. From the 1998 team came a plethora of First team All-PAC selections including Brian Cutlip, Charlie Humes, Jim Ohara and Adam Jack, who was also named Player of the Year. The conference head coach of the year was also from Waynesburg, as the award went to Mike Florak who was assisted by Mike Humiston.

=== Football ===
In 1939, Waynesburg Yellow Jackets football team played in the first televised football game against Fordham University, losing by a score of 34 to 7. In 1966, under head coach Carl DePasqua, the Yellow Jackets football team won the NAIA Football National Championship game in Tulsa, Oklahoma by beating Wisconsin–Whitewater 42–21. The Yellow Jackets are also 2–0 against Penn State. They played the Nittany Lions in 1931 and 1932, beating them 7–0 and 7–6, respectively.

=== Wrestling ===
The Waynesburg Yellow Jackets wrestling team, founded in 1928, represents Waynesburg University in NCAA Division III and competes in the Presidents' Athletic Conference (PAC). The program has a storied history, highlighted by legendary coaches like Raymond “Buck” Murdock, who led the team to national prominence in the mid-20th century, and Ron Headlee, who revitalized the program in the 2000s with seven PAC titles and the school's first Division III national champion, Jake Evans. Over the decades, the Yellow Jackets have produced 17 All-Americans, three national champions, and 43 individual PAC champions, with standout wrestlers like Tony Gizoni, George Lewis, and Steven Burchianti. The team competes at Rudy Marisa Fieldhouse in Waynesburg, Pennsylvania, and is currently led by head coach Bobby Patnesky.

=== Esports ===
The esports program was started in Fall 2022 with the construction of a 25-computer esports arena located on campus in Buhl Hall. Since its foundation, the esports team has had incredible success securing four conference titles and three national championship titles. The Overwatch team won the NECC (National Esports Collegiate Conference) Division IX national championship in 2025 beating East Central University. That same year, the Rocket League team won the NECC Division V national championships by beating Tarleton State University. In 2026, the Super Smash Brothers Ultimate team won their third national title capturing the NECC Division V national championship beating Southwest Minnesota State University after completing an undefeated regular season.
