= List of Waynesburg Yellow Jackets head football coaches =

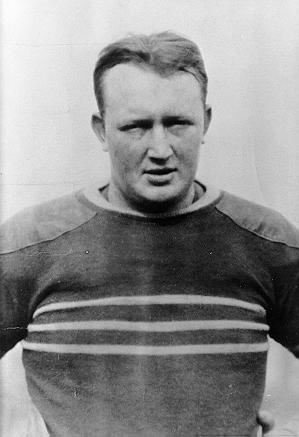
Red Roberts was a first team "All-American" at Centre College in 1921.

The Waynesburg Yellow Jackets football program is a college football team that represents Waynesburg University in the Presidents' Athletic Conference, a part of the Division III (NCAA). The team has had 21 head coaches since its first recorded football game in 1895. Notably, Stan Keck was elected to the College Football Hall of Fame and William Tornabene coached the 1983 Waynesburg Yellow Jackets football team to the program's 300th win. Coach Cornelius Coleman who first took the position for the 2022 season was relieved of his duties on November 11, 2025.

== Key ==
Key to symbols in coaches list
General		Overall		Conference		Postseason (Note: Although the first Rose Bowl Game was played in 1902, it has been continuously played since the 1916 game, and is recognized as the oldest bowl game by the NCAA. "—" indicates any season prior to 1916 when postseason games were not played.)	
No.	Order of coaches (Note: A running total of the number of head coaches, with coaches who served separate tenures being counted only once. Interim head coaches are represented with "Int" and are not counted in the running total. "—" indicates the team played but either without a coach or no coach is on record. "X" indicates an interim year without play.)	GC	Games coached	CW	Conference wins	PW	Postseason wins
DC	Division championships	OW	Overall wins	CL	Conference losses	PL	Postseason losses
CC	Conference championships	OL	Overall losses	CT	Conference ties	PT	Postseason ties
NC	National championships	OT	Overall ties (Note: Overtime rules in college football were introduced in 1996, making ties impossible in the period since.)	C%	Conference winning percentage		
†	Elected to the College Football Hall of Fame	O%	Overall winning percentage (Note: When computing the win–loss percentage, a tie counts as half a win and half a loss.)				

== Coaches ==
Statistics correct as of 2025.

No.	Name	Term	GC	OW	OL	OT	O%	CW	CL	CT	C%	PW	PL	CCs	NCs	Awards
1	Thomas D. Whittles	1895	3	3	0	0	1.000	—	—	—		—	—	—	—	
2	Unknown	1896–1916	90	37	48	5	.439	—	—	—		—	—	—	—	
3	Frank N. Wolf	1921–1922, 1928–1941	129	65	63	1	.508	—	—	—		—	—	—	—	
4	Red Roberts	1923	8	3	4	1	.438	—	—	—		—	—	—	—	
5	Britain Patterson	1924	10	7	2	1	.750	—	—	—		—	—	—	—	
6	Katy Easterday	1925–1927	26	9	13	4	.423	—	—	—		—	—	—	—	
7	Mark L. Booth	1942	8	2	6	0	.250	—	—	—		—	—	—	—	
8	Asa G. Wiley	1946	8	0	7	1	.063	—	—	—		—	—	—	—	
9	Stan Keck^{†}	1947–1950	35	17	15	3	.529	—	—	—		—	—	—	—	
10	John F. Wiley	1951–1954	32	22	9	1	.703	—	—	—		—	—	—	—	
11	John Popovich	1955–1958	32	12	16	4	.438	—	—	—		—	—	—	—	
12	Peter Mazzaferro	1959–1962	34	12	19	3	.397	—	—	—		—	—	—	—	
13	Mike Scarry	1963–1965	26	17	8	1	.673	—	—	—		—	—	—	—	
14	Carl DePasqua	1966–1967	20	19	1	0	.950	—	—	—		—	—	—	1	
15	Darrell Lewis	1968–1972	45	20	25	0	.444	—	—	—		—	—	—	—	
16	Hayden Buckley	1973–1982	87	52	32	3	.615	—	—	—		—	—	—	—	
17	William Tornabene	1983–1986	38	16	21	1	.434	—	—	—		—	—	—	—	
18	Ty Clarke	1987–1993	67	28	39	0	.418	—	—	—		—	—	—	—	
19	Dan Baranik	1994–2000	64	32	32	0	.500	—	—	—		—	—	—	—	
20	Jeff Hand	2001–2004	41	24	17	0	.585	—	—	—		—	—	—	—	
21	Rick Shepas	2005–2016	124	69	55	0	.556	—	—	—		—	—	—	—	
22	Chris Smithley	2017–2021	45	9	36	0	.200	—	—	—		—	—	—	—	
23	Cornelius Coleman	2022–2025	40	14	26	0	.350	—	—	—		—	—	—	—	
