= List of Waynesburg University alumni =

The following is a list of notable alumni from Waynesburg University. Waynesburg University is a private university founded in ca. 1850 and located in Waynesburg, Pennsylvania.

== Alumni ==
- Mary Temple Bayard, writer and journalist
- Clair Bee, basketball coach, inductee to the Basketball Hall of Fame
- Charles E. Boyle, Democratic member of the U.S. House of Representatives from Pennsylvania
- Thomas S. Crago, Republican member of the U.S. House of Representatives from Pennsylvania
- William E. Crow, senator from Pennsylvania
- Albert Baird Cummins, 18th Governor of Iowa, U.S. Senator and two-time presidential candidate
- Lorenzo Danford, U.S. Representative from Ohio
- Joseph Benton Donley, Republican member of the U.S. House of Representatives from Pennsylvania
- Matt Dowling, member of the Pennsylvania House of Representatives
- Charles I. Faddis, Democratic member of the U.S. House of Representatives from Pennsylvania
- William C. Farabee, Harvard anthropologist
- Lanny Frattare, Sports Broadcasting faculty and Pittsburgh Pirates announcer
- Roy E. Furman, 21st Lieutenant Governor of Pennsylvania
- Don Herrmann, National Football League wide receiver for the New York Giants and the New Orleans Saints
- Lucy Dorsey Iams, reform legislator
- John Clark Knox, judge of the United States District Court for the Southern District of New York
- Edward Martin, General of the 28th Infantry Division
- Daniel J. McDaid, legislator and judge
- Stephen L. Mestrezat, Justice at Supreme Court of Pennsylvania
- Mason Miller, closer for the Oakland Athletics of Major League Baseball
- Thomas Ellsworth Morgan, Democratic member of the U.S. House of Representatives from Pennsylvania
- Phil Mushnick, New York Post sports columnist
- George Nethercutt, Harvard fellow and Republican member of the U.S. House of Representatives
- Dave Pahanish, American singer and songwriter
- James Purman, Medal of Honor recipient
- Joseph Warren Ray, Republican member of the U.S. House of Representatives - Pennsylvania
- John Renton, professor of geology
- Joe Righetti, American football player
- H. M. Rowe, businessman and educator
- Alta Schrock, biology professor
- Dave Smith, National League football player
- Pam Snyder, Democratic member of the Pennsylvania House of Representatives
- Paul Stanley, National League basketball player
- Harry Theofiledes, National League football player
- John F. "Jack" Wiley, former National Football League player for the Pittsburgh Steelers, University of Pittsburgh assistant coach, and Waynesburg University's football stadium bears his name
- Morgan Ringland Wise, member of the 46th and 47th Congress of the United States
