= Mike Dunlevy =

American football coach (born c. 1965)

Biographical details
- Born: c. 1965 (age 60–61); Kettering, Ohio, U.S.
- Education: Otterbein College (1987); University of Toledo (1989)

Playing career
- 1983–1986: Otterbein
- Position: Wide receiver

Coaching career (HC unless noted)
- 1987–1988: Toledo (GA)
- 1989: Ohio State (GA)
- 1990–1991: Ohio State (volunteer)
- 1992: Ohio Glory (ST/LB)
- 1994–2001: Waynesburg (DC/ST/LB/DL)
- 2002–2013: Averett
- 2014: Central Washington (LB/S)

Head coaching record
- Overall: 49–69

Accomplishments and honors

Championships
- 1 USA South (2006)

Awards
- USA South Coach of the Year (2003)

Michael D. Dunlevy (born c. 1965) is an American former college football coach. He was the head football coach for Averett University from 2002 to 2013.

== Playing career ==
Dunlevy grew up in Kettering, Ohio, and played high school football for East Fairmont High School. He played college football for Otterbein under head coach Rich Seils from 1983 to 1984 and for Bob Shaw from 1985 to 1986 as a wide receiver.

== Coaching career ==
In 1987, Dunlevy began his coaching career for Toledo as a graduate assistant working with safeties under head coach Dan Simrell. In 1989, Dunlevy served as a graduate assistant working with the secondary for Ohio State under head coach John Cooper. For the next two years he was a volunteer coach working with the defensive line coach. In 1992, he was the special teams coordinator and linebackers coach for the Ohio Glory of the World League of American Football (WLAF) under head coach Larry Little. In the team's only season in existence they went 1–9. In 1994, Dunlevy served as the defensive coordinator, special teams coordinator, linebackers coach, and defensive live coach for Waynesburg under head coaches Dan Baranik and Jeff Hand. In 2002, he earned his first head coaching job for Averett University. He was the second all-time coach following the resignation of Frank Fulton. In twelve year with Averett, he led the team to a 49–69 record and finished his career with the most all-time wins for the school. In 2003, he was named the USA South Athletic Conference (USA South) Coach of the Year. His best season was in 2006 when he led the team to a 7–3 record and a share of the USA South title. He resigned following the 2013 season. In 2014, Dunlevy was hired as the linebackers coach and safeties coach for Central Washington under head coach Ian Shoemaker.

== Personal life ==
In 2015, Dunlevy was hired as the director of regional recruiting for the Next College Student Athlete (NCSA).

== Head coaching record ==
| Year | Team | Overall | Conference | Standing | Bowl/playoffs |
|---|---|---|---|---|---|
Averett Cougars (Dixie Conference / USA South Athletic Conference) (2002–2013)
| 2002 | Averett | 2–7 | 1–5 | 6th | |
| 2003 | Averett | 5–4 | 3–3 | T–4th | |
| 2004 | Averett | 6–4 | 2–4 | 5th | |
| 2005 | Averett | 7–3 | 5–2 | T–3rd | |
| 2006 | Averett | 7–3 | 6–1 | T–1st | |
| 2007 | Averett | 0–10 | 0–7 | 8th | |
| 2008 | Averett | 5–5 | 4–3 | T–4th | |
| 2009 | Averett | 7–3 | 5–2 | 2nd | |
| 2010 | Averett | 5–5 | 3–4 | T–5th | |
| 2011 | Averett | 3–7 | 2–5 | T–5th | |
| 2012 | Averett | 1–9 | 1–6 | 8th | |
| 2013 | Averett | 1–9 | 0–7 | 8th | |
| Averett: | | 49–69 | 32–49 | | |
| Total: | | 49–69 | | | |
National championship Conference title Conference division title or championship game berth
