= Mark Booth =

Mark Booth may refer to:

- Mark Booth, British author whose nom de plume is Jonathan Black
- Mark L. Booth (1911–1988), American football coach
- Mark Bell-Booth, New Zealand politician
- Mark Haworth-Booth (born 1944), British curator
