= 1966 Waynesburg Yellow Jackets football team =

American college football season

1966 Waynesburg Yellow Jackets football

NAIA national champion WPC champion

Champion Bowl, W 42–21 vs. Wisconsin State–Whitewater
- Conference: West Penn Conference
- Record: 11–0 (2–0 WPC)
- Head coach: Carl DePasqua (1st season)

1966 West Penn Conference football standings
	Conf.					Overall
Team	W		L		T	W		L		T
No. 1 Waynesburg $^	2	–	0	–	0	11	–	0	–	0
Grove City	1	–	0	–	1	8	–	0	–	1
Westminster (PA)	1	–	1	–	1	6	–	2	–	1
Geneva	0	–	3	–	0	0	–	8	–	0
$ – Conference champion; ^ – NAIA playoff participant; Rankings from NAIA poll

The 1966 Waynesburg Yellow Jackets football team was an American football team that represented Waynesburg College as a member of the West Penn Conference (WPC) during the 1966 NAIA football season. In their first year under head coach Carl DePasqua, the Yellow Jackets compiled a perfect 11–0 record (2–0 against conference opponents) and won the WPC championship. They advanced to the NAIA playoffs where they defeated New Mexico Highlands in the semifinals and Wisconsin State–Whitewater in the Champion Bowl to win the NAIA national championship. During the regular season, the Yellow Jackets ranked among the best teams in small college football, averaging 149.4 yards in total defense and 40.2 yards in rushing defense.

Running back Rich Dahar was named to the Associated Press 1966 All-Pennsylvania football team. Dahar rushed for 233 yards, rand for three touchdowns, and passed for another in the Champion Bowl. Fullback Rich Ripepi was another key player. Three Waynesburg players went on to play in the NFL: end Don Herrmann (nine seasons in the NFL); end Dave Smith (four seasons); and guard Joe Righetti (two seasons).

The team played its home games in Waynesburg, Pennsylvania.

== Schedule ==
Date	Opponent	Site	Result	Attendance	Source
September 17	Slippery Rock*	Waynesburg, PA	W 31–0		
September 24	at Susquehanna*	Selinsgrove, PA	W 6–0		
October 1	Ohio Northern*	Lima Stadium; Lima, OH	W 30–7		
October 8	California (PA)*	Waynesburg, PA	W 20–7		
October 15	at Frostburg State*	Bobcat Stadium; Frostburg, MD	W 58–0		
October 22	Geneva	Waynesburg, PA	W 54–7	3,000	
October 29	West Virginia Wesleyan*	Waynesburg, PA	W 13–7		
November 5	Findlay*	Waynesburg, PA	W 7–6		
November 12	at Westminster (PA)	New Wilmington, PA	W 14–13		
November 26	vs. New Mexico Highlands*	University Stadium; Albuquerque, NM	W 30–27		
December 10	vs. Whitewater State*	Skelly Field; Tulsa, OK	W 42–21		
*Non-conference game
