= Richard Ferrell =

Richard Ferrell may refer to:

- Richard Allan Ferrell (1926–2005), American physicist
- Richard T. Ferrell (1885–1956), American evangelist
