= Ryerson Station State Park =

State park in Greene County, Pennsylvania

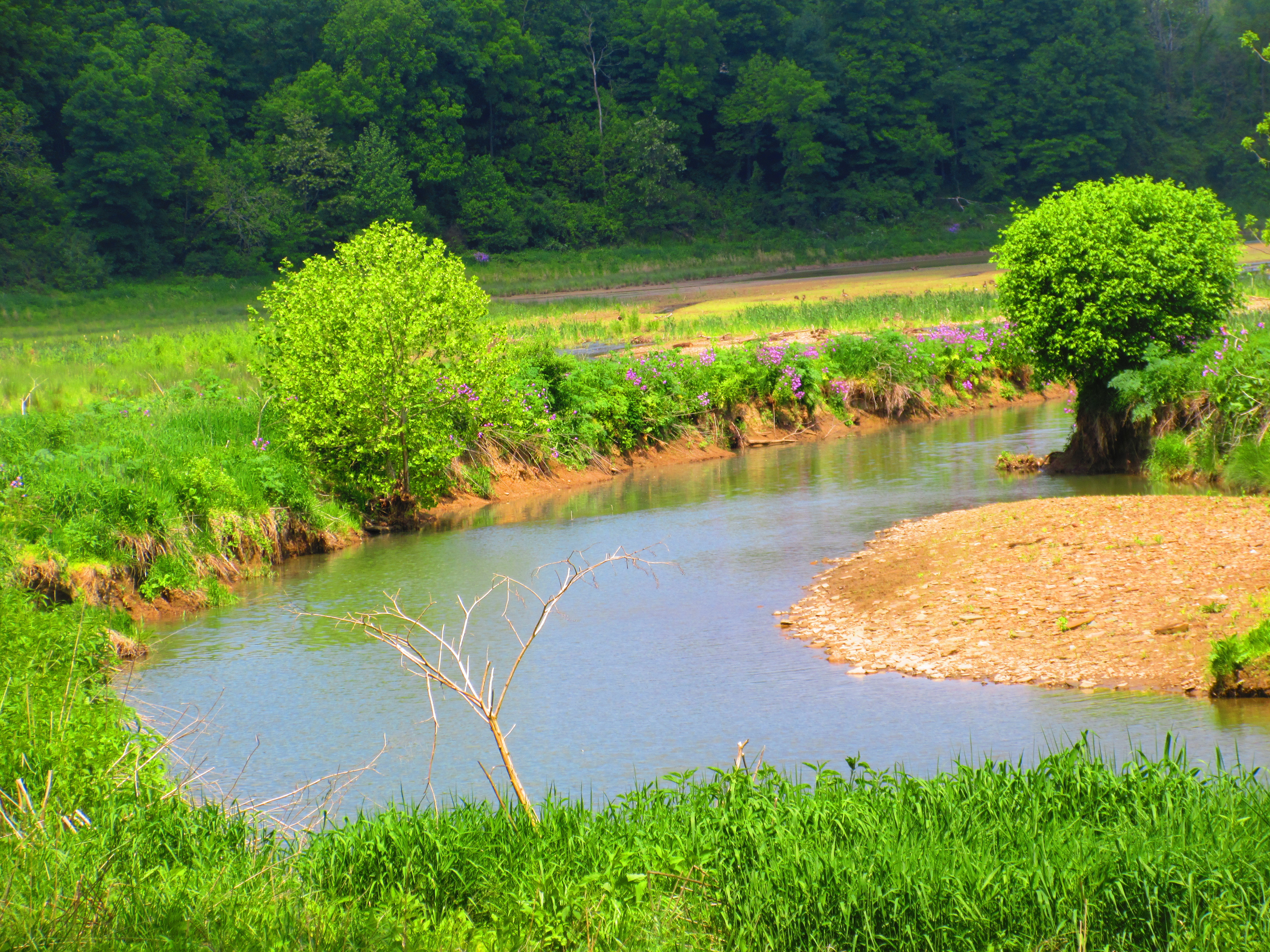

- Location within Pennsylvania Location within the United States
- Interactive map of Ryerson Station State Park
- Location: Richhill Township, Greene County, Pennsylvania, United States
- Coordinates: 39°53′10″N 80°26′44″W
- Area: 1,164 acres (471 ha)
- Elevation: 1,197 feet (365 m)
- Established: 1967
- Administrator: Pennsylvania Department of Conservation and Natural Resources
- Website: Official website
- Pennsylvania State Parks

Ryerson Station State Park is a 1,164-acre (471 ha) Pennsylvania state park in Richhill Township, Greene County, Pennsylvania in the United States. It was previously home to Ronald J. Duke Lake, a 52-acre (21 ha) artificial lake on the North Fork of the Dunkard Fork of Wheeling Creek, that was constructed in 1960, but drained in 2005 due to structural concerns about the dam. Ryerson Station State Park is 3 miles (5 km) from Wind Ridge just off Pennsylvania Route 21 very close to the West Virginia state line.

== History ==
The park is named for Fort Ryerson. This fort was constructed by the Commonwealth of Virginia in 1792 to resist the raids of local Native Americans who fought against the settlement of the Ohio River Valley by the United States. Ownership of the land in this part of Pennsylvania was disputed among several parties including Virginia, Pennsylvania and the Native Americans.

The state acquired the land in 1958. Duke Lake was completed with the construction of a dam in 1960 and the park was finally opened in 1967.

== Recreation ==
There is a camping facility on a ridge overlooking the park. There are 48 sites for tents and travel trailers, with flush toilets, warm showers at the camp site, plus some sites with electricity. Group tenting is permitted in the large group tenting area. Two wooden cottages are available for rent. The cottages have electric lights and outlets as well as double and single bunks that sleep up to five, wooden floors, windows, skylights, a porch, fire ring, and picnic table.

Over 275 picnic tables are available for use on the ground of Ryerson Station State Park. The park also has five pavilions and a small playground in the main picnic area.

Hunting is permitted in 1,000 acres (400 ha) of Ryerson Station State Park. Hunters are expected to follow the rules and regulations of the Pennsylvania Game Commission. The common game species are ruffed grouse, eastern gray squirrels, wild turkey and white-tailed deer. The hunting of groundhogs is prohibited.

Duke Lake had been stocked by the Pennsylvania Fish and Boat Commission with trout in the spring and again in the fall. Non-powered and electric powered boats with current registration from any state and having a launching or mooring permit from the Pennsylvania Fish and Boat Commission had been permitted onto the waters of the lake. Gasoline powered boats were prohibited.

In July 2005, Duke Lake was drawn down due to concerns about the structural integrity of the dam across the North Fork of the Dunkard Fork of Wheeling Creek. As of November 2024, the lake bed remains dry.

Structural cracks in the Duke Lake Dam are reported to be the result of longwall mining.

The dam had been scheduled to be rebuilt by 2017 in a deal with Consol Energy that allowed the company to refrain from admitting fault for the original damage, continue mining under the park, and begin drilling for natural gas under the park in the future. However, due to the ground's mining-related instability, the rebuild was abandoned in 2015.

The swimming pool is open from 11:00 am until 7:00 pm beginning Memorial Day weekend and ending Labor Day weekend. The park has 11 miles (18 km) of hiking trails. The trails pass through several different habitats, mature forests, evergreen plantations, wet valley bottoms and fields.

The snow-covered slopes of the park are opened to sledding and tobogganing when the weather permits. Cross-country skiing and snowmobiling are permitted on some of the hiking trails.
