= John F. Wiley =

American football player and coach (1920–2013)

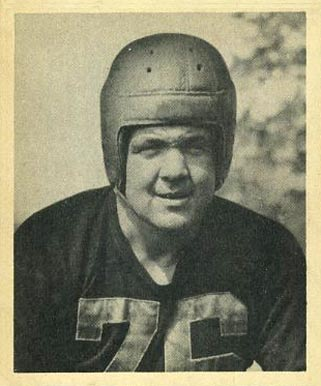
- Wiley on a 1948 Bowman football card

Biographical details
- Born: April 18, 1920; Wind Ridge, Pennsylvania, U.S.
- Died: March 25, 2013 (aged 92); Rock Hill, South Carolina, U.S.

Playing career
- 1938–1940: Waynesburg
- 1946–1950: Pittsburgh Steelers
- Position: Tackle

Coaching career (HC unless noted)
- 1951–1954: Waynesburg
- 1955–1961: Pittsburgh (line)

Head coaching record
- Overall: 22–9–1

John Franklin "Smiling Jack" Wiley (April 18, 1920 – March 25, 2013) was an American football player and coach. He played professionally a tackle for the Pittsburgh Steelers of the National Football League (NFL) from 1946 to 1950. Wiley served as the head football coach at his alma mater, Waynesburg College—now known as Waynesburg University—in Waynesburg, Pennsylvania, from 1951 to 1954, compiling a record of 22–9–1.

== Playing career and miltitary service ==
Wiley played college football as a tackle at Waynesburg College—now known as Waynesburg University—in Waynesburg, Pennsylvania and appeared in the 1939 Waynesburg vs. Fordham football game, the first televised American football game. His three older brothers—Robert, Asa, and Bill—also played football at Waynesburg. The youngest Wiley brother graduated from Waynesburg in 1941. He served in the United States Army during World War II, attaining the rank of captain.

After World War II, Wiley played for the Pittsburgh Steelers of the National Football League (NFL) from 1946 to 1950, under head coaches Jock Sutherland and John Michelosen.

== Coaching career ==
Wiley was the head football coach at his alma mater, Waynesburg, for four seasons, from 1951 to 1954, compiling a record of 22–9–1.

Wiley left Waynesburg to become an assistant at Pitt, where he is credited with recruiting Mike Ditka and Marty Schottenheimer.

== Late life and death ==
Wiley left coaching in 1961 to become a salesman and later regional manager for the L.G. Balfour Jewelry & Taylor Publishing Company. He died on March 25, 2013, in Rock Hill, South Carolina.

== Head coaching record ==
Year	Team	Overall	Conference	Standing	Bowl/playoffs
Waynesburg Yellow Jackets (Independent) (1951–1954)
1951	Waynesburg	6–3			
1952	Waynesburg	7–1			
1953	Waynesburg	4–3			
1954	Waynesburg	5–2–1			
Waynesburg:		22–9–1			
Total:		22–9–1			
