= Richhill Township, Greene County, Pennsylvania =

Township in Pennsylvania, US

Coordinates: 39°52′00″N 80°30′59″W

- Township
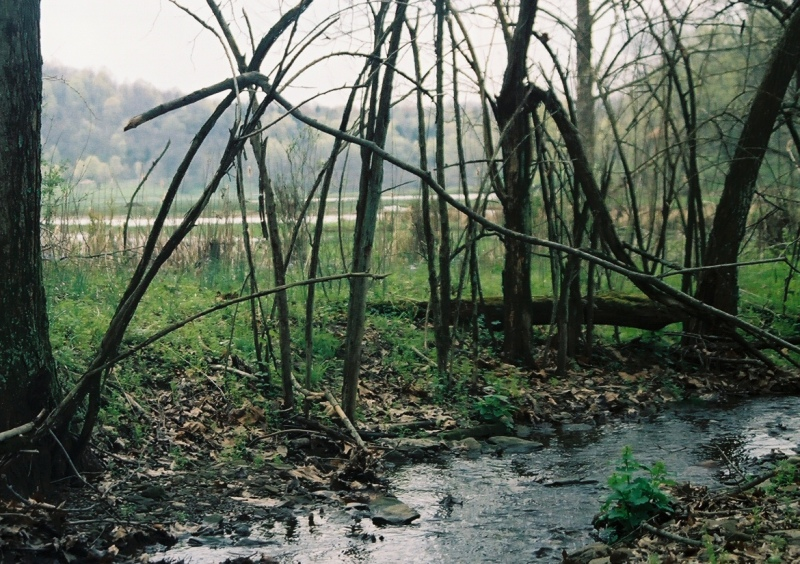
- Ryerson Station State Park is in Richhill Township.

- Flag

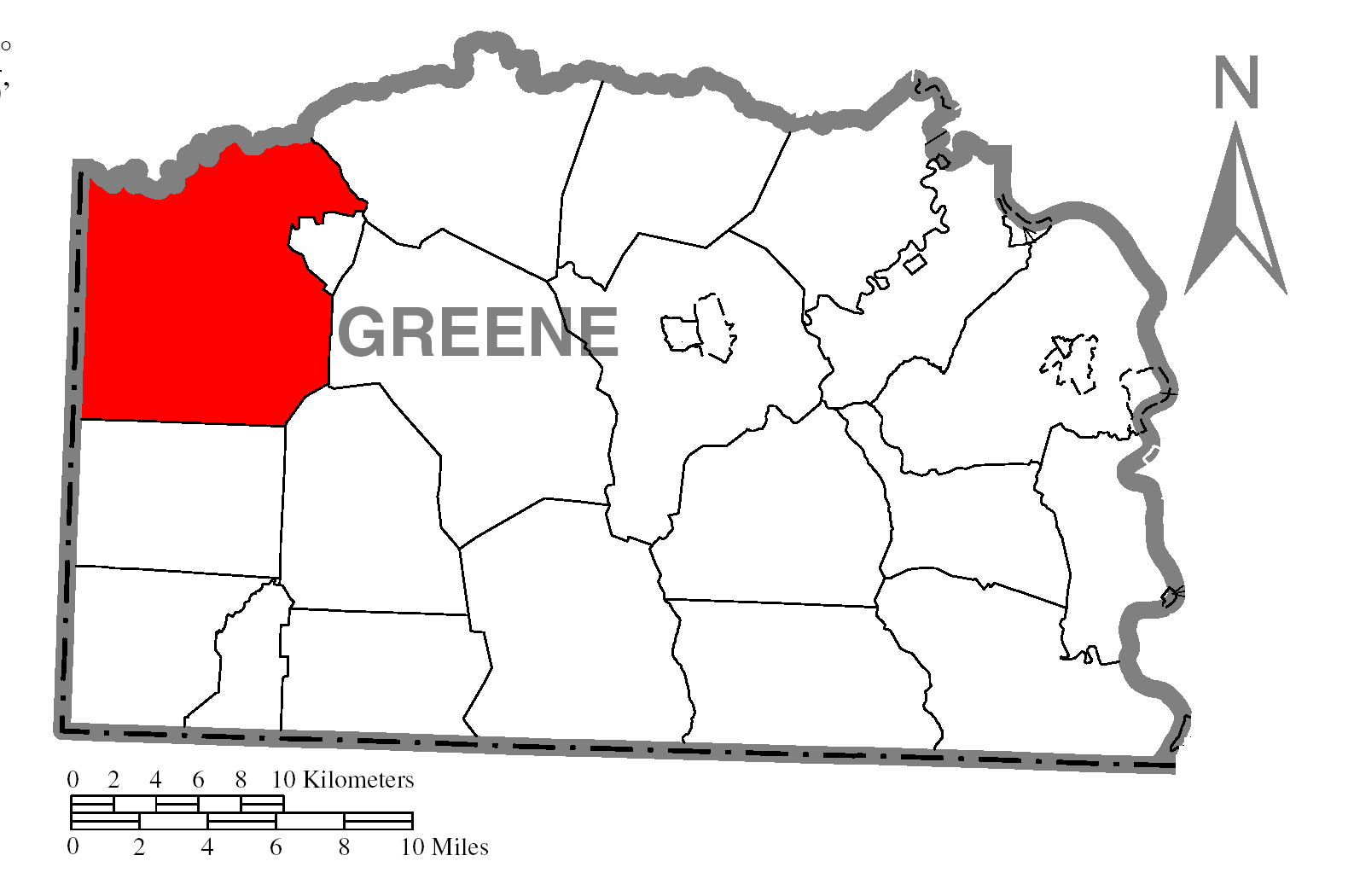
- Location of Richhill Township in Greene County

- Location of Greene County in Pennsylvania
- Country: United States
- State: Pennsylvania
- County: Greene

Area
  - Total: 54.36 sq mi (140.79 km^{2})
  - Land: 54.28 sq mi (140.58 km^{2})
  - Water: 0.081 sq mi (0.21 km^{2})

Population (2020)
  - Total: 771
  - Estimate (2023): 733
  - Density: 15.5/sq mi (5.97/km^{2})
- Time zone: UTC-4 (EST)
  - Summer (DST): UTC-5 (EDT)
- Area code: 724
- FIPS code: 42-059-64512
- Website: https://www.richhilltwp-pa.gov/

Richhill Township is a township in Greene County, Pennsylvania, United States. The population was 771 at the 2020 census, down from 896 at the 2010 census. Ryerson Station State Park is a Pennsylvania state park on Duke Lake in the township.

== History ==
A significant Monongahela village was once located in northern Richhill Township, along the Enlow Fork. Today, the village is known as the Fisher site, and it is listed on the National Register of Historic Places.

Richhill Township was formed in 1792, it was originally part of Washington County. When Greene County was formed in 1796, it included Cumberland, Franklin, Greene, Morgan, Richhill, and a small portion of Finley. Richhill Township is in 18th Congressional District, the 46th Senatorial District, and the 50th Legislative District of Pennsylvania.

== Geography ==
Richhill Township is in the northwestern corner of Greene County. It is bordered to the north, across the Enlow Fork, by Washington County and to the west by the state of West Virginia. Wind Ridge is the primary settlement in the township. Other unincorporated communities include Burdette, Nebo, Time, Crabapple, Durbin, Crows Mills, Ryerson Station, Bristoria, Bryan, Smith Bridge, and Riggs.

According to the United States Census Bureau, the township has a total area of 54.4 square miles (140.8 km^{2}), of which 54.3 square miles (140.6 km^{2}) are land and 0.1 square miles (0.2 km^{2}), or 0.15%, are water. The Enlow Fork of Wheeling Creek forms the northern border of the township (and the Greene County line), and the Dunkard Fork of Wheeling Creek, along with its North and South forks, flow across the southern portion of the township. The Enlow and Dunkard Forks flow west into West Virginia, where Wheeling Creek continues northwest to the Ohio River.

== Demographics ==
Historical population
Census	Pop.	Note	%±
2000	1,062		—
2010	896		−15.6%
2020	771		−14.0%
2025 (est.)	730		−5.3%
U.S. Decennial Census

As of the census of 2000, there were 1,062 people, 402 households, and 299 families residing in the township. The population density was 19.0 people per square mile (7.3/km^{2}). There were 518 housing units at an average density of 9.3/sq mi (3.6/km^{2}). The racial makeup of the township was 98.59% White, 0.09% African American, 0.09% from other races, and 1.22% from two or more races. Hispanic or Latino of any race were 0.47% of the population.

There were 402 households, out of which 35.6% had children under the age of 18 living with them, 59.7% were married couples living together, 9.2% had a female householder with no husband present, and 25.6% were non-families. 23.9% of all households were made up of individuals, and 10.9% had someone living alone who was 65 years of age or older. The average household size was 2.64 and the average family size was 3.08.

In the township the population was spread out, with 27.6% under the age of 18, 7.8% from 18 to 24, 30.4% from 25 to 44, 21.3% from 45 to 64, and 12.9% who were 65 years of age or older. The median age was 35 years. For every 100 females, there were 97.0 males. For every 100 females age 18 and over, there were 99.2 males.

The median income for a household in the township was $31,667, and the median income for a family was $36,625. Males had a median income of $32,125 versus $18,958 for females. The per capita income for the township was $15,845. About 14.9% of families and 19.7% of the population were below the poverty line, including 24.9% of those under age 18 and 12.8% of those age 65 or over.
