= Frank E. Higgins =

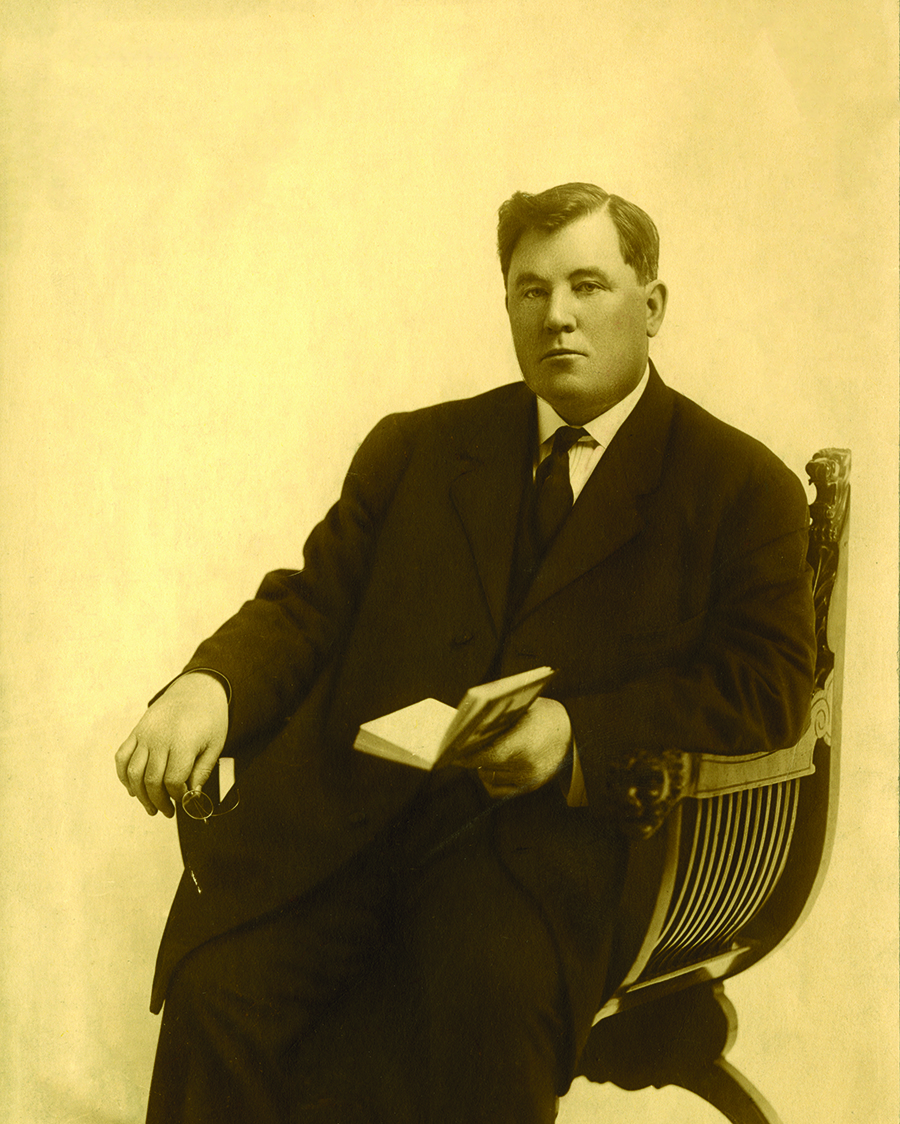
Frank E. Higgins

Frank E. Higgins (19 August 1865 – 4 January 1915) was an American Presbyterian minister and evangelist to logging camps in Minnesota. He was known as the "Lumberjacks' Sky Pilot".

Higgins was born in Toronto and grew up in Shelburne, Ontario. He moved to the United States in 1890, and studied at Hamline University in the hopes of becoming a Methodist minister. He did poorly in his studies, however, and dropped out. He started pastoring a Presbyterian church in 1899 and was ordained by the Presbyterian Church in the United States of America in 1902. He preached his first sermon to the lumberjacks in 1895, and was appointed Superintendent of Lumber Camp Work in 1908.

Higgins recruited many other evangelists to his work, including Richard T. Ferrell. He was the subject of three novels by Thomas D. Whittles: The Lumberjack Sky Pilot (1908), The Parish in the Pines (1912), and Frank Higgins, Trail Blazer (1920).

The Book News Monthly described him as "a man of sterling worth – simple, whole-souled, sincere. He possessed a vigorous body, a cool head, a loving heart, and a genuine contempt for hardship".
