= 1983 Waynesburg Yellow Jackets football team =

American college football season

1983 Waynesburg Yellow Jackets football
- Conference: Independent
- Record: 6–3–1
- Head coach: William Tornabene (1st season)
- Offensive coordinator: Mike Forbes
- Captain: Ralph Pantalone
- Home stadium: John F. Wiley Stadium

1983 NAIA Division II independents football records
	Conf.			Overall
Team	W	L	T	W		L		T
No. 1 Northwestern (IA) ^		–		14	–	0	–	0
No. 5 Westminster (PA) ^		–		9	–	2	–	0
No. 12 Loras		–		8	–	2	–	1
No. 16 Iowa Wesleyan		–		7	–	2	–	1
Texas Lutheran		–		7	–	3	–	0
Azusa Pacific		–		6	–	3	–	0
Waynesburg		–		6	–	3	–	1
Benedictine (KS)		–		6	–	4	–	0
Geneva		–		5	–	4	–	0
Peru State		–		4	–	5	–	0
Cal Lutheran		–		4	–	6	–	0
Chadron State		–		4	–	6	–	0
Oklahoma Panhandle State		–		3	–	7	–	0
Westmar		–		2	–	7	–	1
Evangel		–		2	–	8	–	0
^ – NAIA Division II playoff participant; Rankings from NAIA Division II poll

The 1983 Waynesburg Yellow Jackets football team was an American football team that represented the Waynesburg University during the 1983 NAIA Division II football season. In their first year under head coach William Tornabene, the Yellow Jackets compiled a record of 6–3–1 record.

In 1983, Waynesburg secured the program's 300th victory. The program was also placed on probation by the NAIA for providing improper financial aid to two football players.

Waynesburg's passing leader in 1983 was quarterback Tim Garry with 1,775 passing yards. Running back Otto Birkhead led the team with 509 rushing yards, averaging 9.3 yards per carry. Otto Birkhead and Matt Toney each led the team with 28 receptions, but Toney led all receivers with 495 receiving yards. Mike Zeglen, the kicker, led the team in scoring with 29 points.

Waynesburg's defensive leaders in 1983 were defensive back Steven Burchianti and Linebacker Kevin Jozwiakowski.

== Schedule ==
Date	Opponent	Site	Result	Source
September 3	Glenville State	John F. Wiley Stadium; Waynesburg, PA	T 7–7	
September 10	IUP	George P. Miller Stadium; Indiana, PA	L 0–21	
September 17	Fairmont State	John F. Wiley Stadium; Waynesburg, PA	W 14–13	
September 24	Geneva	Reeves Field; Beaver Falls, PA	W 17–6	
October 1	at Duquesne	South High Stadium; Pittsburgh, PA	W 23–6	
October 8	Emory and Henry^{†}	John F. Wiley Stadium; Waynesburg, PA	W 24–7	
October 15	Frostburg State	Bobcat Stadium; Frostburg, MD	W 24–17	
October 23	at Westminster (PA)	New Wilmington, PA	L 2–20	
October 29	Grove City	Robert E. Thorn Field; Grove City, PA	W 14–9	
November 5	Salem	Catalano Stadium; Salem, WV	L 21–6	
^{†}Homecoming

== Game summaries ==
=== Glenville State ===
Glenville at Waynesburg - Game Summary

Team	1	2	3	4	Total
Glenville State	0	7	0	0	7
Waynesburg	0	0	0	7	7

- Date: September 3
- Location: Home

Scoring summary
Q2		Glenville State	Jim Bird 7-yard pass from Jeff Metheny (Mark Szklennik kick)	Glenville State 7–0
Q3		Waynesburg	Interception by Waynesburg defense (first of three by Jeff Metheny)	Glenville State 7–0
Q3		Waynesburg	Blocked Glenville State field goal attempt	Glenville State 7–0
Q4		Waynesburg	Interception by Waynesburg defense (second of three by Jeff Metheny)	Glenville State 7–0
Q4	10:14	Waynesburg	Matt Toney 22-yard pass from Tim Gary (Mike Zeglen kick)	Glenville State 7–7
Q4		Waynesburg	Interception by Waynesburg defense (third of three by Jeff Metheny)	Glenville State 7–7

Waynesburg College opened its 1983 football season with a hard-fought 7–7 tie against Glenville State, in a game marked by stout defense and timely plays on both sides. Glenville State struck first, capitalizing on a second-quarter drive with a 7-yard touchdown pass from Jeff Metheny to Jim Bird. Mark Szklennik’s extra point gave the Pioneers a 7–0 lead that held until the final quarter. Waynesburg responded in the fourth quarter. With 10:14 remaining, quarterback Tim Garry connected with Matt Toney on a 22-yard touchdown pass, and Mike Zeglen nailed the extra point to even the score. Neither team would find the end zone again as the defenses held firm to preserve the tie. Statistically, Glenville outgained Waynesburg with 306 yards of total offense, including 159 rushing yards on 51 attempts. Running back Byron Brooks led all rushers with 117 yards on 28 carries. Metheny completed 13 of 27 passes for 147 yards but was intercepted three times by a resilient Waynesburg defense, which also blocked a key field goal to help keep the game within reach. Waynesburg totaled 230 offensive yards, with 113 coming on the ground and 117 through the air. Gary finished 17 of 31 passing with one interception. Despite falling behind early, the Yellow Jackets showed resolve and defensive strength in earning the road draw to open their season.

Team	Category	Player	Statistics
Waynesburg	Passing	Tim Garry	17/31, 117 Yds, TD, INT
Waynesburg	Rushing		
Waynesburg	Receiving	Matt Toney	22 Yd TD Rec
Glenville State	Passing	Jeff Metheny	13/27, 147 Yds, TD, 3 INT
Glenville State	Rushing	Byron Brooks	28 Car, 117 Yds
Glenville State	Receiving	Jim Bird	7 Yd TD Rec

=== IUP ===
Team	1	2	3	4	Total
Waynesburg	0	0	0	0	0
• IUP	0	0	7	14	21

- Date: September 10
- Location: Away
- Game start: 1:30 PM

Scoring summary
Q2	IUP	Thompson 1 yard rushing touchdown (Domenick extra point)	IUP 7–0
Q3	IUP	Potter 9 yard touchdown pass to Rich Ingold (Domenick extra point)	IUP 14–0
Q3	IUP	Thompson 1 yard rushing touchdown (Domenick extra point)	IUP 21–0

Indiana University of Pennsylvania (IUP) defeated Waynesburg College 21–0. The game was a defensive stalemate at half with neither team posting any points. In the third quarter, IUP’s offense eventually wore down the Waynesburg defensive line with its consistent rushing attack while Waynesburg's offense was unable to find its footing. In total, Waynesburg’s offense was limited to just 106 total yards on the day and the Yellow Jackets' running backs were held to just 21 rushing yards on twelve attempts.

On the other hand, IUP marched down the field in the second half with three scoring drives of 48, 70, and 90 yards. Despite entering the Waynesburg 35-yard line on eight occasions, the Crimson Hawks capitalized for just three touchdowns. IUP Quarterback Jeff Ingold led the aerial attack, completing 19 of 30 passes for 254 yards. On the ground, IUP tailback Seidel powered the run game with 133 yards on 21 carries.

Team	Category	Player	Statistics
Waynesburg	Passing	Tim Garry	11/27, 85 Yds, 1 INT
Waynesburg	Rushing	Joe Polacek	8 Rush Yds on 6 carries
Waynesburg	Receiving	Kent Johnston	3 Rec, 37 Yds
IUP	Passing	Jeff Ingold	19/30, 254 Yds, TD
IUP	Rushing	Seidel	133 Rush Yds on 21 carries
IUP	Receiving	Rich Ingold	9 Yd TD Rec

=== Fairmont State ===
Team	1	2	3	4	Total
Fairmont State	0	13	0	0	13
• Waynesburg	0	0	6	8	14

- Date: September 17
- Location: Home

Scoring summary
Q2	Fairmont State	Eric Soliday 39-yard field goal	Fairmont State 3–0
Q2	Fairmont State	Eric Soliday 37-yard field goal	Fairmont State 6–0
Q2	Fairmont State	Joe Thompson 4-yard pass from Mark Johnson (kick good)	Fairmont State 13–0
Q3	Waynesburg	Fumble recovery by John Higgins on Fairmont 11-yard line	Fairmont State 13–0
Q3	Waynesburg	Sherley Hairston 11-yard pass from Tim Garry (kick failed)	Fairmont State 13–6
Q3	Waynesburg	Blocked 30-yard field goal attempt by Jim Rubino	Fairmont State 13–6
Q4	Waynesburg	Cline Hunt 11-yard touchdown reception from Tim Garry (Sherley Hairston run for two-point conversion)	Waynesburg 14–13
Q4	Waynesburg	Forced fumble by Joe Persichetti recovered by Waynesburg defense	Waynesburg 14–13

In a tightly contested home game, Waynesburg College erased a 13-point halftime deficit to edge Fairmont State 14–13. The Yellow Jackets scored twice in the second half and converted a crucial two-point attempt to seal the comeback win.

Fairmont controlled the first half behind quarterback Mark Johnson, who completed 14 of 19 passes for 185 yards, including a four-yard touchdown to Joe Thompson. Kicker Eric Soliday added field goals of 39 and 37 yards in the second quarter to give the Falcons their 13-point advantage at the break.

Quarterback Tim Garry led the Waynesburg response, throwing for 174 yards on 17 of 27 passing with two touchdowns. Sherley Hairston caught an 11-yard touchdown and later ran in the decisive two-point conversion after Cline Hunt hauled in the game-tying score. Defensively, cornerback Steve Burchianti was named “Jacket of the Week” after recording 13 tackles, including seven solo stops. Joe Persichetti forced a fumble at the Fairmont three-yard line, and John Higgins recovered another at the Falcon 11 to help set up scoring drives.

Team	Category	Player	Statistics
Fairmont State	Passing	Mark Johnson	14/19, 185 Yds, TD
Fairmont State	Rushing	–	–
Fairmont State	Receiving	Joe Thompson	4 Yd TD Rec
Waynesburg	Passing	Tim Garry	17/27, 174 Yds, 2 TD
Waynesburg	Rushing	Sherley Hairston	2 Pt Conv, key rushes
Waynesburg	Receiving	Cline Hunt	11 Yd TD Rec

Team	Player	Stat line
Waynesburg	Steve Burchianti	13 TKL (7 solo)
Waynesburg	Joe Persichetti	FF
Waynesburg	John Higgins	FR
Fairmont State	Jim Rubino	Blocked FG

=== Duquesne ===
Waynesburg Yellow Jackets at Duquesne Dukes – Game Summary

Team	1	2	3	4	Total
• Waynesburg	7	10	0	6	23
Duquesne	0	0	6	0	6

- Date: October 3
- Location: South High Stadium, Duquesne, PA

Scoring summary
Q1	Waynesburg	Jeff Standish fumble recovery in endzone	Waynesburg 7–0
Q1	Waynesburg	Steve Burchianti interception	Waynesburg 7–0
Q2	Waynesburg	Matt Toney 46-yard touchdown reception from Tim Garry (kick good)	Waynesburg 14–0
Q2	Waynesburg	Mike Zeglen 31-yard field goal	Waynesburg 17–0
Q3	Waynesburg	Bob Abbiatici interception	Waynesburg 17–0
Q3	Duquesne	Jim Radermacher 79-yard touchdown reception from Scott Henson (kick failed)	Waynesburg 17–6
Q4	Waynesburg	David Zilli 52-yard touchdown reception from Tim Garry (kick good)	Waynesburg 23–6
Q4	Waynesburg	Steve Burchianti second interception	Waynesburg 23–6
Q4	Waynesburg	Joe Persichetti forced fumble recovered by Pete Butler	Waynesburg 23–6

Waynesburg College posted a convincing 23–6 win over Duquesne University on October 3 at South High Stadium, powered by an efficient aerial attack and a defense that forced seven turnovers. Quarterback Tim Garry led the Yellow Jackets with 280 passing yards and two long touchdown passes, one a 46-yard strike to Matt Toney and the other a 52-yard pass to David Zilli; the latter being his first of the year after starting the season at fullback. Toney finished with five catches for 110 yards, while running back Sherley Hairston added 95 yards on the ground. However, it was team captain offensive lineman Ralph Pantalone that earned Offensive Jacket of the Week honors for leading the rushing attack with his blocking hitting on 87% of his assignments. Mike Zeglen chipped in with field goals of 31 and 32 yards, and Jeff Standish recovered a fumble in the endzone for another score.

On the defensive side, Waynesburg clamped down hard on the Duquesne offense, limiting the Dukes to just 9 completions in 28 attempts. Defensive back Steve Burchianti led the charge with two interceptions, a fumble recovery, two pass deflections (including one that lead to an interception), and six tackles, which earned him Defensive Jacket of the Week honors. Coach Tornabene said Steven "almost came away with a third... but a receiver stripped the ball from him" and "he looked like he had a safety on that one play [Dukes' tailback was tackled for a loss on the 1 yard line]." These actions earned him another Jacket of the Week honors. Bob Abbiatici and Craig Harris also recorded interceptions, while Joe Persichetti forced a fumble and Jeff Standish added a recovery to stifle the Dukes' opening drive. Despite the loss, Duquesne’s Pedro Bowman managed 110 rushing yards, and Scott Henson connected with Jim Radermacher for a 79-yard touchdown. The extra point attempt failed, and a 33-yard field goal attempt by Jim Parey was also missed.

Team	Category	Player	Statistics
Duquesne	Passing	Scott Henson	9/28, 176 Yds, TD
Duquesne	Rushing	Pedro Bowman	110 Rush Yds
Duquesne	Receiving	Jim Radermacher	79 Yd TD Rec
Waynesburg	Passing	Tim Garry	280 Yds, 2 TD
Waynesburg	Rushing	Sherley Hairston	95 Rush Yds
Waynesburg	Receiving	Matt Toney	5 Rec, 110 Yds, TD

Team	Player	Stat line
Waynesburg	Steve Burchianti	2 INT, FR, 2 PD, 6 TKL
Waynesburg	Bob Abbiatici	INT
Waynesburg	Craig Harris	INT
Waynesburg	Joe Persichetti	FF
Waynesburg	Jeff Standish	FR, TD

=== Emory and Henry ===
Team	1	2	3	4	Total
Emory and Henry	0	0	0	7	7
• Waynesburg	7	14	3	0	24

- Date: October 8
- Location: Waynesburg, PA

Scoring summary
Q2	Fairmont State	Eric Soliday 39-yard field goal	Fairmont State 3–0
Q2	Fairmont State	Eric Soliday 37-yard field goal	Fairmont State 6–0
Q2	Fairmont State	Joe Thompson 4-yard pass from Mark Johnson (kick good)	Fairmont State 13–0
Q3	Waynesburg	Sherley Hairston 11-yard pass from Tim Garry (kick failed)	Fairmont State 13–6
Q4	Waynesburg	Cline Hunt touchdown reception from Tim Garry (Sherley Hairston run for two-point conversion)	Waynesburg 14–13

Waynesburg celebrated its homecoming game with a 24–7 victory over Emory and Henry. Tailback Otto Birkhead amassed 112 yards on 11 carries. His performance, which included a 37-yard touchdown run, earned him "Jacket of the Week" honors, highlighting a strong offensive showing that also featured a four-yard touchdown pass from quarterback Tim Garry to tight end David Tucci and a one-yard touchdown run by fullback Pete Long. The Yellow Jacket defense was stout, holding Emory and Henry to just one score in the fourth quarter against the second-team defense, with safety Craig Harris contributing eight tackles, a fumble recovery, and an interception.

Team	Category	Player	Statistics
Emory and Henry	Passing	–	–
Emory and Henry	Rushing	Otto Birkhead	112 Rush Yds, 37 Yd TD Run
Emory and Henry	Receiving	–	–
Waynesburg	Passing	Tim Garry	(includes 4-yd TD pass to David Tucci)
Waynesburg	Rushing	Pete Long	1 Yd TD Run
Waynesburg	Receiving	David Tucci	4 Yd TD Rec

Team	Player	Stat line
Waynesburg	Craig Harris	8 TKL, FR, INT

=== Frostburg State ===
Team	1	2	3	4	Total
• Waynesburg	7	3	7	7	24
Frostburg	0	0	3	14	17

- Date: October 15
- Location: Bobcat Stadium, Frostburg, MD

Scoring summary
Q1	Waynesburg	Pete Long ran for a 1 yard score (Zeglen extra point)	Waynesburg 7–0
Q2	Waynesburg	Zeglen 39 yard Field Goal	Waynesburg 10–0
Q3	Waynesburg	Birkhead 72 yard pass from Garry (Zeglen extra point)	Waynesburg 17–0
Q3	Frostburg	Lippold 34 yard Field Goal	Waynesburg 17–3
Q4	Frostburg	Mohler 22 yard pass to Theis for a touchdown (Lippold extra point)	Frostburg 17–10
Q4	Frostburg	Persichetti 48 yard interception return for a touchdown (Zeglen extra point)	Frostburg 24–10
Q4	Frostburg	Mohler 66 yard pass to Walker for a touchdown (Lippold extra point)	Frostburg 24–17

Waynesburg College secured a 24-17 victory over Frostburg in a non-conference college football game. Offensive contributions for Waynesburg included a 72-yard touchdown pass from Tim Garry to Otto Birkhead, and Garry completed 15 passes in total. Frostburg's scoring took place primarily in the fourth quarter and included 66 yard deep pass from Quarterback Mohler to receiver Tony Walker and another 22 yard pass to Theis. The game came down to the final play. Frostburg's game tying rushing touchdown was called back due to a penalty and the Waynesburg defense rallied to make a goal line stand to secure Yellow Jacket's fifth win of the season.

=== Westminster ===
Team	1	2	3	4	Total
Waynesburg	0	2	0	0	2
• Westminster	0	6	7	7	20

- Date: October 23

Scoring summary
Q2	Westminster	Rich Edder ran for a 3 yard score (Fleischman missed the extra point)	Westminster 6–0
Q2	Waynesburg	Waynesburg scores a safety	Waynesburg 2–6
Q3	Westminster	Darwin Short scored a 1-yard run(Fleischman kick)	Westminster 13–2
Q4	Westminster	Touchdown (Fleischman kick)	Westminster 20–2

The game was a defensive battle and remained close until the close of the 3rd quarter in spite of quarterback Tim Garry hitting on 42% of his passing attempts and throwing four interceptions. Westminster finally scored two touchdowns in the fourth to secure the win. The victory raised Westminster to No.2 in the NAIA Division II and kept Waynesburg at No. 20 in the NAIA Division II.

=== Salem ===
Team	1	2	3	4	Total
Waynesburg	0	0	0	6	6
• Salem	0	0	7	14	21

- Date: November 5, 1983
- Location: Salem, West Virginia

Scoring summary
Q3	Salem	Joe Montouth 5-yard run (kick good)	Salem 7–0
Q4	Salem	Joe Montouth 3-yard run (kick good)	Salem 14–0
Q4	Waynesburg	Zeglen Field Goal	Salem 14–3
Q4	Waynesburg	Zeglen Field Goal	Salem 14–6
Q4	Salem	Joe Montouth 1-yard run (kick good)	Salem 21–6

Waynesburg’s season came to a frustrating close as they fell to Salem, 21–6, in the final game of the year. Salem’s Joe Montouth proved to be the difference-maker, carrying the ball 28 times for 147 yards and scoring all three of his team’s touchdowns. Waynesburg leaned heavily on the passing game, attempting 51 passes, but managed to complete only 18 for 210 yards. The offense was severely weakened due to runningback, Otto Birkhead, suffering a separated shoulder and fullback Pete Long's suspension. Mike Zeglen was awarded Jacket of the Week honors for posting the team's only scores. Despite the loss, the Yellow Jackets capped a strong campaign with a 6-3-1 overall record.

Team	Category	Player	Statistics
Waynesburg	Passing	Tim Garry	18/51, 210 Yds
Waynesburg	Rushing		
Waynesburg	Receiving		
Salem	Passing		
Salem	Rushing	Joe Montouth	28 Car, 147 Yds, 3 TD
Salem	Receiving		

== Roster ==
1983 Waynesburg Football football team roster
Players
Coaches
Offense

Pos.	#	Name	Class
QB	12	Tim Garry
QB	11	Casey Cavanaugh	Sr
QB		Kent Marisa
QB		John Theofiledes
QB		Don Barnhart
QB		Scot Lee
RB	33	Otto Birkhead	Sr
RB	22	Sherley Hairston	So
FB	38	Cline Hunt
FB	34	Rich Dalton
WR	87	Matt Toney
WR		Ted Rodavich
WR		Mark Hess
WR	89	David Zilli
LG	62	Tom Corbett
RG	67	Phil Magdic
G	61	Ralph Pantalone (C)	Sr
LT	76	Joe Miller
RT	68	Dave Plunt
C	58	Scott Schifko

Defense

Pos.	#	Name	Class
DE	48	Freemont Catlin
DT	93	Jeff Standish	Sr
DT		Scott Schifko
NG	81	John Higgins
DT	85	Vince Frank
LB	80	Kevin Jozwiakowski	Sr
LB	24	Pete Butler
LB		Bob Doody
LB		Lou Joseph
LB		Dan Cougar
LB	47	Mike Bishop	Fr
DB	36	Steve Burchianti	Sr
DB	25	Richie Barnes
DB		Jim Rubino
DB	23	Craig Harris
DB	42	Jay Jones

Special teams

Pos.	#	Name	Class
K		Mike Zeglen
K		Ted Rodavich
P		Tim Garry

Head coach

- William Tornabene

Coordinators/assistant coaches

Legend

- (C) Team captain
- (S) Suspended
- (I) Ineligible
- Injured
- Redshirt

=== Depth chart ===
Defense
4–3

FS
Craig Harris
⋅
⋅

WLB	MLB	SLB
Bob Doody	Kevin Jozwiakowski	Mike Bishop
Lou Joseph	⋅	Jay Jones
⋅	⋅	⋅

SS
Bob Abbaticci
⋅
⋅

CB
Steven Burchianti
Rich Barnes
⋅

DE	DT	DT	DE
Scott Schifko	Vince Frank	Jeff Standish	Freemont Catlin
⋅	⋅	⋅	⋅
⋅	⋅	⋅	⋅

CB
Pete Butler
Craig Harris
⋅

Offense
Pro-style

WR
Matt Toney
Ted Rodavich
Joe Persichetti

WR
Cline Hunt
⋅
⋅

LT	LG	C	RG	RT
Joe Miller	Tom Corbett	Scott Schifko	Ralph Pantalone	Dave Plunt
⋅	⋅	Phil Magdic	⋅	⋅
⋅	⋅	⋅	⋅	⋅

TE
Dave Tucci
⋅
⋅

WR
Mark Hess
David Zilli
Sean Brown

QB
Tim Garry
Casey Cavanaugh
John Theofiledes

Special teams
PK Mike Zeglen
PK Ted Rodavich
P Tim Garry
KR Sherley Hairston
PR Matt Toney
LS Phil Magdic
H Kent Marisa

RB
Otto Birkhead
Sherley Hairston
Calvin Camp
