= Fisher site =

- Fisher Site (36GR21)
- U.S. National Register of Historic Places
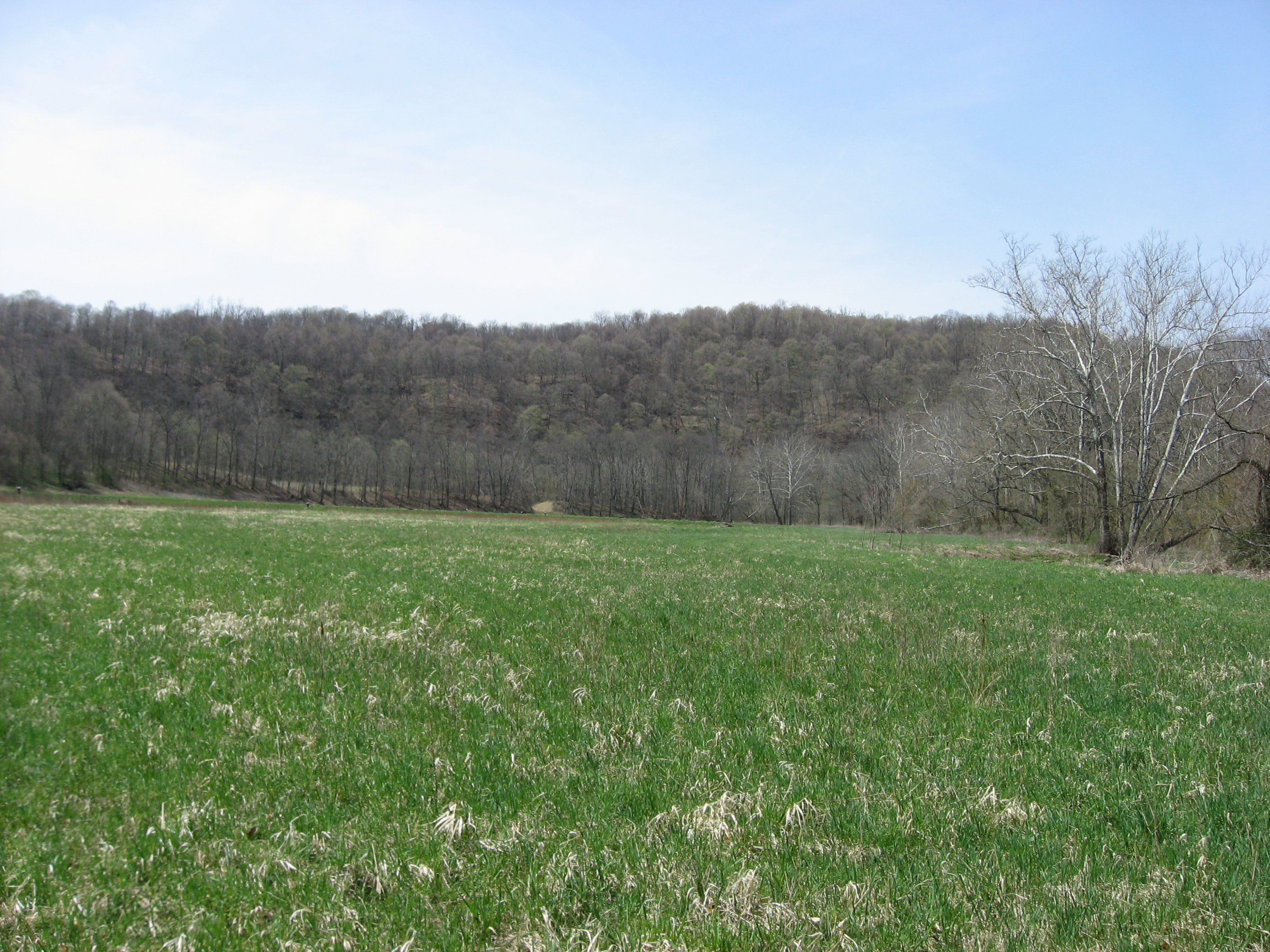
- Overview of the site

- Location within Pennsylvania Location within the United States
- Location: Off Camp Resort Road along the Enlow Fork, in Richhill Township, Greene County, Pennsylvania
- Coordinates: 39°57′36″N 80°28′0″W
- Area: 1.8 acres (0.73 ha)
- NRHP reference No.: 82001536
- Added to NRHP: November 15, 1982

The Fisher Site is an archaeological site in northwestern Greene County, Pennsylvania, United States. Located along a tributary of Wheeling Creek in northern Richhill Township, it was once occupied by a Monongahela village. It has been ranked as one of southwestern Pennsylvania's most important locations for prehistoric preservation.

== Location ==
The Fisher Site lies in the floodplain of the Enlow Fork, occupying a relatively rare clearing in the predominantly wooded hills of northern Greene County. Wooded lands around the site and along the Enlow Fork are part of State Game Lands 302, a public hunting and fishing preserve.

== Profile ==
Testing has revealed that the village was part of the Drew Phase of the Monongahela; it was the tenth Drew site to be identified. The location of the Fisher Site in bottomland distinguishes it from all previously-known Drew sites and most other Monongahela villages; due to the frequent warfare among the Monongahela, their villages were typically built on hilltops.

== Excavations ==
Although property owners had collected surface artifacts at the site since at least the early 1940s, the Fisher Site was first observed in 1962 during testing to reveal natural gas wells in the area. Fourteen years passed before an archaeological investigation was conducted at the site; testing conducted by this investigation revealed it to be a Late Woodland village site. A third excavation, carried out much more meticulously than either of the others, was completed shortly before 1981.

Nearly 1,100 artifacts were recovered from the test pits of the third excavation, including animal bones, stone tools, and over 500 potsherds of various styles. Among the potsherds were pieces decorated with unusual geometric designs; no other site is known to have produced pottery with these designs.

== Preservation ==
Intensive industrialization in the river valleys of southwestern Pennsylvania has likely destroyed most of the region's Monongahela sites originally located in floodplains. Moreover, it is possible that many unknown sites have been destroyed during the process of surface mining for coal in the region. In contrast to this common situation, the Enlow Fork in the vicinity of the Fisher Site is quite undeveloped; only small roads traverse the region, and — unlike in southern Richhill Township — no gas wells operate nearby. The pristine condition of the site and the likelihood that it will yield information about the little-known Drew Phase has led it to be assessed as highly worthy of preservation. In accordance with this goal, the site was listed on the National Register of Historic Places in 1982.

== See also ==
- List of Native American archaeological sites on the National Register of Historic Places in Pennsylvania
