= 1939 Waynesburg vs. Fordham football game =

Broadcast from New York, the first football game to be televised

1939 Waynesburg vs. Fordham first televised football game
Waynesburg Yellow Jackets	Fordham Rams
(1–0)	(0–0)
7	34
Head coach: Frank N. Wolf	Head coach: Jim Crowley
	1	2	3	4	Total
Waynesburg	7	0	0	0	7
Fordham	7	14	7	6	34
- Date: September 30, 1939
- Season: 1939
- Stadium: Triborough Stadium
- Location: New York City
- Attendance: 9,000

United States TV coverage
- Network: NBC
- Announcers: Bill Stern

The 1939 Waynesburg vs. Fordham football game was a college football game between the Fordham Rams and the Waynesburg Yellow Jackets played on September 30, 1939. The game was played at Triborough Stadium on New York City's Randall's Island. Fordham won the game 34–7. Broadcast by NBC, the contest was the first American football game ever televised.

== Game play ==
Fordham entered the game a pre-season pick for the national championship, but the first score was completed by Waynesburg when Bobby Brooks completed a 63-yard run for a touchdown on the third play of the game. Waynesburg only scored in the first quarter but managed to keep Fordham within reach during the early part of the game. Fordham scored in every quarter, leaving the final score at 34–7.

Fordham's offense managed sixteen first downs and 337 yards, while Waynesburg managed only five first downs for a total of 157 yards. Fordham blocked a punt in both the first and second halves of the game and recorded an interception in the fourth quarter that the offense was able to turn into a touchdown.

== Sports broadcasting firsts ==
NBC broadcast the game on station W2XBS with one camera and Bill Stern was the sole announcer. Estimates are that the broadcast reached approximately 1,000 television sets.

The game came just over a month after the Brooklyn Dodgers hosted the Cincinnati Reds in the first-ever televised professional baseball game, and five months after the Princeton and Columbia baseball teams played the first televised American sporting event.

Sports broadcasting continued less than one month later on October 22 with a telecast of a game between the now-defunct Brooklyn "Football" Dodgers and the Philadelphia Eagles at Ebbets Field. Brooklyn won 24–14 in what became the first televised professional football game. On February 28, 1940, the University of Pittsburgh played Fordham at Madison Square Garden in the first televised basketball game.

College football on television continued with the second televised college game just one month later, on October 28, when the Kansas State Wildcats hosted the Nebraska Cornhuskers for their homecoming contest.

== See also ==
- College football on television
- List of historically significant college football games
