= Asa G. Wiley =

American football and wrestling coach (1911–1995)

Biographical details
- Born: 1911; Wind Ridge, Pennsylvania, U.S.
- Died: March 11, 1995 (aged 83); Portersville, Pennsylvania, U.S.

Playing career

Football
- 1932: Waynesburg

Coaching career (HC unless noted)

Football
- 1939–1941: Waynesburg HS (PA)
- 1942: Mount Pleasant HS (PA)
- 1943: Greensburg HS (PA) (assistant)
- 1944–1945: Greensburg HS (PA)
- 1946: Waynesburg

Wrestling
- 1939–1942: Waynesburg HS (PA)

Head coaching record
- Overall: 0–7–1 (college football)

Asa Gordon "Ace" Wiley Jr. (1911 – March 11, 1995) was an American football and wrestling coach. Wiley was the head football coach at Waynesburg College—now known as Waynesburg University—in Waynesburg, Pennsylvania, serving for the 1946 season and compiling a record of 0–7–1.

== Biography ==
Gordon was born in Wind Ridge, Pennsylvania. He attended Waynesburg College, where he captained the football team in 1932 and graduated in 1933.

He subsequently earned master's degree from the University of Pittsburgh. Gordon was a schoolteacher and coached wrestling and other sports in Wind Ridge, Waynesburg, and Greensburg, Pennsylvania.

== Head coaching record ==
=== College football ===
Year	Team	Overall	Conference	Standing	Bowl/playoffs
Waynesburg Yellow Jackets (Independent) (1946)
1946	Waynesburg	0–7–1			
Waynesburg:		0–7–1			
Total:		0–7–1			
