= Harry Theofiledes =

American football player (born 1944)

No. 17
- Position: Quarterback

Personal information
- Born: April 19, 1944 (age 82); Homestead, Pennsylvania, U.S.
- Listed height: 5 ft 10 in (1.78 m)
- Listed weight: 180 lb (82 kg)

Career information
- High school: Homestead
- College: Waynesburg
- NFL draft: 1966: undrafted

Career history
- Washington Redskins (1966–1968); New York Jets (1970)*
- * Offseason or practice squad member only
- Stats at Pro Football Reference

Aris Harry Theofiledes (born April 19, 1944) is an American former professional football player who was a quarterback for the Washington Redskins of the National Football League (NFL). After playing college football for the Waynesburg Yellow Jackets, Theofiledes played five games for the Redskins during the 1968 season.

== Awards ==
- 1969 Official All-ACFL
- 1971 Official All-ACFL
- 1971 ACFL Offensive Most Valuable Player
