= Richard T. Ferrell =

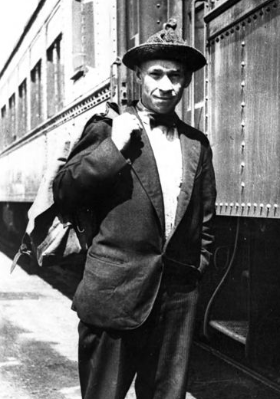
Ferrell in 1921.

Richard Townsend Ferrell, known as Dick Ferrell (1885–1956), was an American Presbyterian minister and evangelist to logging camps in the Inland Northwest. Like his mentor Frank E. Higgins, he was known as the "Skypilot of the Lumberjacks".

According to his tombstone, Ferrell was born in 1885, a date supported by a biographical article appearing in The Idaho Forester in 1932. Other sources, however, erroneously list his birth year as 1855.

He was born in Elizabethtown, Illinois and became the welterweight boxing champion of Southern Illinois. He was converted through the preaching of John Timothy Stone, whom he heard at Fourth Presbyterian Church in Chicago. Ferrell attended Moody Bible Institute (Henry Parsons Crowell paid his tuition) and became student pastor at First Presbyterian Church. After meeting itinerant evangelist Frank Higgins, however, he felt called to preach to lumberjacks, and resigned from Moody. He was commissioned by the Board of Home Missions of the Presbyterian Church in the United States of America to spread the gospel among the logging camps of the Idaho Panhandle; later his parish included Eastern Washington and Western Montana.

According to Glenn Daman, Ferrell "spurned the prevalent attitude of pursuing an urban church and recognition to pursue the obscurity of rural ministry." Daman goes on to note that "In an average year, he traveled 19,048 miles; delivered 217 sermons; visited 222 camps, hospitals, missions, Sunday schools, and day schools; called on 902 families and 83 sick persons; wrote 380 letters; and handed out 633 Gospels and tracts plus hundreds of pounds of secular books and magazines."
