= Carl DePasqua =

American football player and coach (1927–2021)

Biographical details
- Born: October 28, 1927; Williamsport, Pennsylvania, U.S.
- Died: September 15, 2021 (aged 93)

Playing career
- 1946–1949: Pittsburgh

Coaching career (HC unless noted)
- 1958–1965: Pittsburgh (DB)
- 1966–1967: Waynesburg
- 1968: Pittsburgh Steelers (assistant)
- 1969–1972: Pittsburgh

Head coaching record
- Overall: 32–30

Accomplishments and honors

Championships
- 1 NAIA (1966); 2 WPC (1966–1967)

Carl A. DePasqua (October 28, 1927 – September 15, 2021) was an American football player and coach. DePasqua was an assistant coach at the University of Pittsburgh under head coach John Michelosen. He later served as the head football coach at Waynesburg University from 1966 to 1967 and at Pittsburgh from 1969 to 1972, compiling a career college football record of 32–30. His Waynesburg Yellow Jackets won the NAIA Football National Championship in 1966.

== Coaching career ==
DePasqua was an assistant coach at the University of Pittsburgh from 1958 until the firing of head coach John Michelosen after the 1965 season. DePasqua was the head football coach at the Waynesburg University in Waynesburg, Pennsylvania. He held that position for the 1966 and 1967 seasons. His coaching record at Waynesburg was 19–1. In 1968, DePasqua served as an assistant coach in the National Football League (NFL) for the Pittsburgh Steelers before returning to the University of Pittsburgh as head football coach in 1969. His Panther teams did turn in convincing wins against powerhouse teams such as West Virginia and Syracuse and posted a competitive season in 1970. His record at Pittsburgh was 13–29, with a winning percentage of .310.

== Death ==
His death was announced on September 17, 2021.

== Head coaching record ==
Year	Team	Overall	Conference	Standing	Bowl/playoffs	NAIA^{#}
Waynesburg Yellow Jackets (West Penn Conference) (1966–1967)
1966	Waynesburg	11–0	2–0	1st	W NAIA Championship	1
1967	Waynesburg	8–1	2–0	1st		7
Waynesburg:		19–1	4–0			
Pittsburgh Panthers (NCAA University Division independent) (1969–1972)
1969	Pittsburgh	4–6				
1970	Pittsburgh	5–5				
1971	Pittsburgh	3–8				
1972	Pittsburgh	1–10				
Pittsburgh:		13–29				
Total:		32–30				
National championship Conference title Conference division title or championship game berth
^{#}Rankings from NAIA poll.
