= Thomas D. Whittles =

American novelist

Biographical details
- Born: December 27, 1873; Lancashire, England
- Died: December 6, 1950 (aged 76); Carlton, Minnesota, U.S.

Playing career
- 1895: Waynesburg

Coaching career (HC unless noted)
- 1895: Waynesburg

Head coaching record
- Overall: 3–0

Thomas Davies Whittles (December 27, 1873 – December 6, 1950) was an American Presbyterian missionary, novelist, and college football coach. He was the author of three missionary novels based on the life of Frank E. Higgins: The Lumberjack's Sky Pilot, The Parish of the Pines, and Frank Higgins, Trail Blazer. Whittles attended Waynesburg College—now known as Waynesburg University—in Waynesburg, Pennsylvania as a pre-ministry student. They organized the school's first football team, for which he played and coached. He led the 1895 team to a record of 3–0.

Whittles died on December 6, 1950, in Carlton, Minnesota.

== Head coaching record ==
Year	Team	Overall	Conference	Standing	Bowl/playoffs
Waynesburg Yellow Jackets (Independent) (1895)
1895	Waynesburg	3–0			
Waynesburg:		3–0			
Total:		3–0			
