= Jonathan Black =

British author

- Other name: Mark Booth
- Citizenship: British
- Education: Ipswich School; Oriel College, Oxford
- Occupation: Author
- Known for: Author, The Secret History of the World, The Sacred History: How Angels, Mystics and Higher Intelligence Made Our World

Jonathan Black is a British author, known for his books The Secret History of the World and The Sacred History: How Angels, Mystics and Higher Intelligence Made Our World. He is in the charge of Century, an imprint of Random House UK.

== Biography ==
Jonathan Black is the pen name of Mark Booth. He was educated at Ipswich School and Oriel College, Oxford, where he studied Philosophy and Theology. He has worked in publishing for over twenty years. He taught English in Italy after college then moved to London in 1993 working for Waterstones bookstore. In 2008 the Secret History of the World became NY Times bestseller, along with it being a bestseller in France. In his most well known work, he discusses "altered state of consciousness" metaphysics, secret societies, occult symbolism, and religion. Black suggests these secret schools of thought are key to understanding the underlying truth of the universe.

== Works ==
- The Secret History of the Universe (2026)
- The Secret History of the World (2007), available from Quercus Books UK
- The Sacred History: How Angels, Mystics and Higher Intelligence Made Our World (2013)
- The Secret History of Dante: Unearthing the Mysteries of the Inferno (ebook)

== See also ==
- Mythology
- Graham Hancock
