= Darrell Lewis =

American football player and coach (1935–2020)

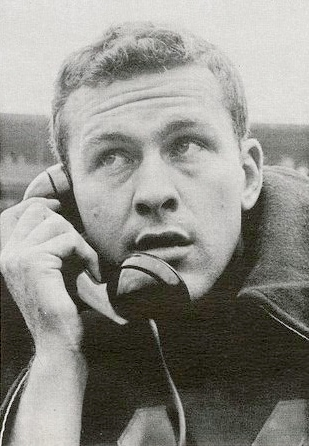
- Lewis from The 1957 Owl

Biographical details
- Born: June 19, 1935; Pittsburgh, Pennsylvania, U.S.
- Died: April 19, 2020; Pittsburgh, Pennsylvania, U.S.

Playing career
- 1954–1956: Pittsburgh
- Position: Quarterback

Coaching career (HC unless noted)
- 1967: Pittsburgh (freshmen)
- 1968–1972: Waynesburg

Head coaching record
- Overall: 20–25

Accomplishments and honors

Championships
- 1 WPC (1968)

Darrell J. Lewis (June 19, 1935 – April 19, 2020) was an American college football player and coach. He played quarterback in college for the University of Pittsburgh Panthers football team. Lewis was the head football coach at Waynesburg University in Waynesburg, Pennsylvania for five seasons, from 1968 until 1972. His coaching record at Waynesburg was 20–25.

Lewis died on April 19, 2020.

== Head coaching record ==
| Year | Team | Overall | Conference | Standing | Bowl/playoffs | NAIA^{#} |
|---|---|---|---|---|---|---|
Waynesburg Yellow Jackets (West Penn Conference) (1968–1972)
| 1968 | Waynesburg | 7–2 | 2–0 | 1st | | 19 |
Waynesburg Yellow Jackets (NAIA Division II independent) (1969–1972)
| 1969 | Waynesburg | 5–4 | | | | |
| 1970 | Waynesburg | 5–4 | | | | |
| 1971 | Waynesburg | 2–7 | | | | |
| 1972 | Waynesburg | 1–8 | | | | |
| Waynesburg: | | 20–25 | 2–0 | | | |
| Total: | | 20–25 | | | | |
National championship Conference title Conference division title or championship game berth
^{#}Rankings from NAIA Division II poll.
