= Hayden Buckley =

American football player and coach

Biographical details
- Born: May 7, 1930; Berlin Heights, Ohio, U.S.
- Died: June 29, 2013 (aged 83); Stuart, Florida, U.S.
- Education: Ohio Wesleyan University, bachelors 1952 and Kent State University, masters

Playing career
- 1949–1951: Ohio Wesleyan
- Position: Quarterback

Coaching career (HC unless noted)
- 1957–1959: Martins Ferry HS (OH)
- 1960: George Washington (backfield)
- 1961–1963: Virginia (assistant)
- 1964: George Washington (backfield)
- 1966–1972: West Virginia (DC/DB)
- 1973–1982: Waynesburg

Head coaching record
- Overall: 52–32–3 (college); 18–11–1 (high school)

Claude Hayden Buckley (May 7, 1930 – June 29, 2013) was an American former football player and coach.

== Playing career ==
Buckley played college football as a quarterback at Ohio Wesleyan University from 1949 to 1951. As of 2009, he still held the school record for the longest pass play at 91 yards.

== Coaching career ==
Buckley was the head football coach at Waynesburg University in Waynesburg, Pennsylvania for 10 seasons, from 1973 until 1982, compiling a record of 52–32–3.

== Head coaching record ==
=== College ===
Year	Team	Overall	Conference	Standing	Bowl/playoffs	NAIA^{#}
Waynesburg Yellow Jackets (NAIA Division II independent) (1973–1982)
1973	Waynesburg	3–5				
1974	Waynesburg	6–3				
1975	Waynesburg	4–4–1				
1976	Waynesburg	6–3				18
1977	Waynesburg	7–2				11
1978	Waynesburg	6–2				
1979	Waynesburg	6–3				
1980	Waynesburg	5–3				
1981	Waynesburg	5–3–1				
1982	Waynesburg	4–4–1				
Waynesburg:		52–32–3				
Total:		52–32–3				
^{#}Rankings from NAIA Division II poll.
