= Rick Shepas =

American football player and coach (born 1965)

Biographical details
- Born: March 16, 1965 (age 61)

Playing career
- 1983–1986: Youngstown State
- 1988: Pittsburgh Gladiators
- Position: Wide receiver

Coaching career (HC unless noted)
- 1989: Alliance HS (OH) (DB/WR)
- 1990–1992: Poland Seminary HS (OH) (DC)
- 1993–1995: Poland Seminary HS (OH)
- 1996–1997: Seneca Valley HS (PA)
- 1998–2004: Massillon HS (OH)
- 2005–2016: Waynesburg (PA)

Head coaching record
- Overall: 69–55 (college); 97–35 (high school)
- Bowls: 1–3

Accomplishments and honors

Championships
- 1 PAC (2012)

Rick Shepas (born March 16, 1965) is an American former football player and coach. He served as the head football coach at the Waynesburg University in Waynesburg, Pennsylvania from 2005 to 2016, compiling a record of 69–55.

== Head coaching record ==
=== College ===
| Year | Team | Overall | Conference | Standing | Bowl/playoffs |
|---|---|---|---|---|---|
Waynesburg Yellow Jackets (Presidents' Athletic Conference) (2005–2016)
| 2005 | Waynesburg | 4–6 | 2–4 | T–4th | |
| 2006 | Waynesburg | 6–4 | 5–1 | 2nd | |
| 2007 | Waynesburg | 8–3 | 5–1 | 2nd | L ECAC Southeast Championship |
| 2008 | Waynesburg | 5–5 | 2–4 | 5th | |
| 2009 | Waynesburg | 5–5 | 2–4 | T–4th | |
| 2010 | Waynesburg | 6–4 | 4–3 | T–3rd | |
| 2011 | Waynesburg | 5–5 | 5–3 | T–2nd | |
| 2012 | Waynesburg | 10–1 | 7–1 | T–1st | W ECAC Southwest Bowl |
| 2013 | Waynesburg | 7–4 | 5–3 | 3rd | L ECAC Northwest Bowl |
| 2014 | Waynesburg | 8–3 | 6–2 | 3rd | L ECAC Southwest Bowl |
| 2015 | Waynesburg | 3–7 | 2–6 | 8th | |
| 2016 | Waynesburg | 2–8 | 2–6 | T–8th | |
| Waynesburg: | | 69–55 | 47–38 | | |
| Total: | | 69–55 | | | |
