= 1966 Whitewater State Warhawks football team =

American college football season

1966 Whitewater State Warhawks football

WSUC champion

NAIA Championship, L 21–42 vs. Waynesburg
- Conference: Wisconsin State University Conference
- Record: 10–1 (8–0 WSUC)
- Head coach: Forrest Perkins (11th season)
- Home stadium: Hamilton Field

1966 Wisconsin State University Conference football standings
	Conf.					Overall
Team	W		L		T	W		L		T
No. 2 Whitewater State $^	8	–	0	–	0	10	–	1	–	0
River Falls State	6	–	1	–	1	6	–	2	–	1
Stevens Point State	6	–	2	–	0	6	–	3	–	0
La Crosse State	5	–	3	–	0	6	–	3	–	0
Platteville State	3	–	4	–	1	4	–	4	–	1
Oshkosh State	3	–	5	–	0	3	–	6	–	0
Stout State	2	–	6	–	0	3	–	6	–	0
Eau Claire State	1	–	7	–	0	1	–	7	–	1
Superior State	1	–	7	–	0	1	–	8	–	0
$ – Conference champion; ^ – NAIA playoff participant; Rankings from NAIA poll

The 1966 Whitewater State Warhawks football team represented Wisconsin State University—Whitewater—now known as the University of Wisconsin–Whitewater—as a member of the Wisconsin State University Conference (WSUC) during the 1966 NAIA football season. Led by 11th-year head coach Forrest Perkins, the Warhawks compiled an overall record of 10–1 with a conference mark of 8–0, winning the WSUC title. Whitewater State was invited to the NAIA Football National Championship playoffs, where they beat the Central Dutch in the semifinals before losing to Waynesburg in the title game.

== Schedule ==
Date	Time	Opponent	Site	Result	Attendance	Source
September 10		vs. Central Michigan*	Saginaw, MI (Red Feather game)	W 40–16	8,200–9,000	
September 17	7:30 p.m.	Stevens Point State	Hamilton Field; Whitewater, WI	W 13–9	3,500	
September 24		at Stout State	Menomonie, WI	W 48–20	4,000	
October 1		at Platteville State	Platteville, WI	W 33–7	3,000	
October 8		Superior State	Hamilton Field; Whitewater, WI	W 55–7	3,000	
October 22		at Eau Claire State	Eau Claire, WI	W 34–19	2,500	
October 29		River Falls State	Hamilton Field; Whitewater, WI	W 17–0	6,300	
November 5		La Crosse State	Hamilton Field; Whitewater, WI	W 49–14	3,500	
November 12		at Oshkosh State	Jackson Street Athletic Field; Oshkosh, WI	W 23–21	3,000	
November 29	1:30 p.m.	Central (IA)*	Hamilton Field; Whitewater, WI (NAIA Semifinal)	W 41–18	5,200	
December 10	1:30 p.m.	vs. Waynesburg*	Skelly Stadium; Tulsa, OK (NAIA Championship)	L 21–42	6,070	
*Non-conference game; All times are in Central time
