= William Tornabene =

American football player and coach (born 1942)

Biographical details
- Born: March 14, 1942 (age 84); Pittsburgh, Pennsylvania, U.S.

Playing career
- 1961–1963: VMI
- Position: Center

Coaching career (HC unless noted)
- 1973: Waynesburg (assistant)
- 1974–1975: Peters Township HS (PA)
- 1976–1979: VMI (assistant)
- 1980–1982: Waynesburg (OC)
- 1983–1986: Waynesburg

Head coaching record
- Overall: 16–21–1 (college)

William S. Tornabene (born March 14, 1942) is former American football player and coach.

== Playing career ==
Tornabene played college football at the Virginia Military Institute (VMI) from 1961 to 1963 and was co-captain of the team his senior year. This would have included the 1963 Oyster Bowl loss against Navy.

== Coaching career ==
Tornabene was the head football coach at Waynesburg University in Waynesburg, Pennsylvania, serving for four seasons, from 1983 to 1986, and compiling a record of 16–21–1.

Tornabene had previously served several terms in the assistant coaching staff at Waynesberg, including a term under future Miami Dolphins assistant coach Mike Scarry. He also was an assistant coach at VMI and head coach at Peters Township High School in McMurray, Pennsylvania.

== Head coaching record ==
=== College ===
Year	Team	Overall	Conference	Standing	Bowl/playoffs
Waynesburg Yellow Jackets (NAIA Division II independent) (1983–1986)
1983	Waynesburg	6–3–1			
1984	Waynesburg	2–6			
1985	Waynesburg	4–6			
1986	Waynesburg	4–6			
Waynesburg:		16–21–1			
Total:		16–21–1			
