= Ty Clarke (American football) =

American football coach

Biographical details
- Born: April 29, 1953 (age 73)

Coaching career (HC unless noted)
- 197?–1980: Muskingum (assistant)
- 1981–1983: Ohio Northern (OC/RB)
- 1984–1986: Fairmont State (DC)
- 1987–1993: Waynesburg

Head coaching record
- Overall: 28–39

Ty Clarke (born April 29, 1953) an American former football coach. He served as the head football coach for the Waynesburg University in Waynesburg, Pennsylvania for seven seasons, from 1987 to 1993, compiling a record of 28–39. He previously served as assistant coach at Muskingum University, Ohio Northern University, and Fairmont State University.

== Head coaching record ==
Year	Team	Overall	Conference	Standing	Bowl/playoffs
Waynesburg Yellow Jackets (NAIA Division II independent) (1987–1989)
1987	Waynesburg	5–4			
1988	Waynesburg	2–8			
1989	Waynesburg	4–7			
Waynesburg Yellow Jackets (Presidents' Athletic Conference) (1990–1993)
1990	Waynesburg	6–4	3–1	2nd	
1991	Waynesburg	6–3	3–1	2nd	
1992	Waynesburg	2–7	1–3	4th	
1993	Waynesburg	3–6	1–3	T–4th	
Waynesburg:		28–39	8–8		
Total:		28–39			
