= Frank N. Wolf =

American football and basketball player and coach (1897–1949)

Biographical details
- Born: February 22, 1897; McKeesport, Pennsylvania, U.S.
- Died: April 3, 1949 (aged 52); Mt. Lebanon, Pennsylvania, U.S.
- Education: Pennsylvania State College

Coaching career (HC unless noted)

Football
- 1921–1922: Waynesburg
- 1923–1927: Williamson HS (WV)
- 1928–1941: Waynesburg

Basketball
- 1921–1923: Waynesburg
- 1928–1943: Waynesburg

Head coaching record
- Overall: 65–63–10 (college football); 207–141 (college basketball)

Accomplishments and honors

Championships
- Football; Tri-State (1932)

Frank Nicholas Wolf (February 22, 1897 – April 3, 1949) was an American football and basketball player and coach. He served as the head football coach at Waynesburg College—now known as Waynesburg University in Waynesburg, Pennsylvania, from 1921 to 1922 and again from 1928 to 1941, compiling a record of 65–63–10.

== Biography ==
Wolf was born on February 22, 1897, in McKeesport, Pennsylvania, and graduated from Pennsylvania State College in 1921. At Penn State, he lettered in football, basketball, and baseball.

Wolf was also the head basketball coach at Waynesburg from 1921 to 1923 and again from 1928 to 1943, tallying a mark of 207–141. 1939, Wolf coached Waynesburg against Fordham in the first football game ever televised.

Wolf died on April 3, 1949, of a cerebral hemorrhage, at his home in Mt. Lebanon, Pennsylvania.

== Head coaching record ==
=== College football ===
Year	Team	Overall	Conference	Standing	Bowl/playoffs
Waynesburg Yellow Jackets (Independent) (1921–1922)
1921	Waynesburg	3–1			
1922	Waynesburg	6–4			
Waynesburg Yellow Jackets (Tri-State Conference) (1928–1933)
1928	Waynesburg	0–6–2	0–3–1	T–4th	
1929	Waynesburg	5–4	2–2	T–3rd	
1930	Waynesburg	2–7	1–1	3rd	
1931	Waynesburg	3–3–2	2–1	T–2nd	
1932	Waynesburg	8–1	4–0	1st	
1933	Waynesburg	2–7	1–3	5th	
Waynesburg Yellow Jackets (Independent) (1934–1941)
1934	Waynesburg	5–4			
1935	Waynesburg	4–4–1			
1936	Waynesburg	4–5			
1937	Waynesburg	5–3–2			
1938	Waynesburg	4–5			
1939	Waynesburg	6–3–1			
1940	Waynesburg	4–3–1			
1941	Waynesburg	4–4–1			
Waynesburg:		65–63–10	9–10–1		
Total:		65–63–10			
National championship Conference title Conference division title or championship game berth
