= Lucy Dorsey Iams =

American welfare worker (1855–1924)

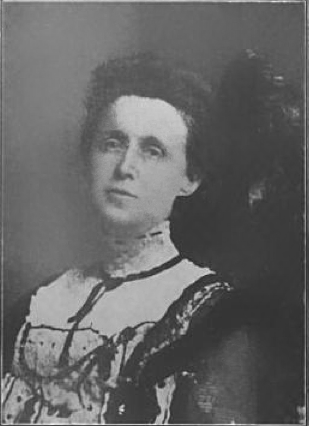
- Born: November 13, 1855; Oakland, Maryland, U.S.
- Died: October 26, 1924 (aged 68); Pittsburgh, Pennsylvania, U.S.
- Resting place: Allegheny Cemetery, Pittsburgh, Pennsylvania, U.S.
- Education: Waynesburg College
- Occupation: Welfare worker
- Spouse: Franklin Pierce Iams (m. 1877)

Lucy Dorsey Iams (November 13, 1855 – October 26, 1924) was an American welfare worker and reform legislation leader based in Pittsburgh, Pennsylvania. She played a critical role in the drafting of a 1903 Pennsylvania tenement law.

== Biography ==
Lucy Virginia Dorsey was born at Oakland, Maryland on November 13, 1855. Her father was a Methodist minister and died in the late 1850s. After her mother died a few years later, she was raised by her grandparents. She graduated from Waynesburg College in 1873 and spent several years teaching in public schools.

She married Franklin Pierce Iams in 1877, a lawyer involved in the political affairs of the Democratic Party. She served as his secretary and became a successful court stenographer.

Iams was active with the Civic Club of Allegheny County and became its first vice president in 1902. She played a critical role in the drafting of a 1903 Pennsylvania tenement law and chaired the Club's Legislative Committee until the 1920s.

She also served on the legislative committees of the Associated Charities of Pittsburgh, the Consumers' League of Western Pennsylvania and the Allegheny County Child Labor Associations. According to historian Roy Lubove, "in a sense she acted as an informal coordinator of reform legislation for western Pennsylvania."

Iams made an unsuccessful run for Pittsburgh City Council in 1921. The same year she was appointed as a Trustee of the Western Penitentiary of Pennsylvania by Governor Gifford Pinchot.

== Illness, death and interment ==
Iams died from pneumonia on October 26, 1924 in Pittsburgh and was interred at the Allegheny Cemetery.
