= Dan Baranik =

American football coach

Biographical details
- Born: February 28, 1962 (age 64)

Coaching career (HC unless noted)
- 1984–1985: Shippensburg (WR)
- 1987: Lock Haven (OLB)
- 1988–1989: Maryland (RB)
- 1990: Olivet Nazarene (DB)
- 1991–1993: Lehigh (WR/TE)
- 1994–2000: Waynesburg
- 2001–2004: West Point Prep (NY)
- 2005–2008: Army (WR)
- 2010: Guilford (OC/QB)
- 2011–?: Fishburne Military (VA)

Head coaching record
- Overall: 32–32 (college)

Accomplishments and honors

Championships
- 1 PAC (1998)

Dan Baranik (born February 28, 1962) is an American football coach. He served as the head football coach at Waynesburg University from 1994 to 2000, compiling a record of 32–32.

== Head coaching record ==
=== College ===
Year	Team	Overall	Conference	Standing	Bowl/playoffs
Waynesburg Yellow Jackets (Presidents' Athletic Conference) (1994–2000)
1994	Waynesburg	4–5	2–2	T–2nd	
1995	Waynesburg	5–4	2–2	3rd	
1996	Waynesburg	2–7	2–3	4th	
1997	Waynesburg	5–4	3–2	3rd	
1998	Waynesburg	5–4	3–1	T–1st	
1999	Waynesburg	5–4	2–2	3rd	
2000	Waynesburg	6–4	2–2	3rd	
Waynesburg:		32–32	16–14		
Total:		32–32			
National championship Conference title Conference division title or championship game berth
