= Don Herrmann =

American football player (born 1947)

No. 85, 87
- Position: Wide receiver

Personal information
- Born: June 5, 1947 (age 79); Newark, New Jersey, U.S.
- Listed height: 6 ft 2 in (1.88 m)
- Listed weight: 205 lb (93 kg)

Career information
- High school: Chatham (Chatham Township, New Jersey)
- College: Waynesburg (1965-1968)
- NFL draft: 1969: 15th round, 379th overall pick

Career history
- New York Giants (1969–1974); New Orleans Saints (1975–1977)

Career NFL statistics
- Receptions: 234
- Receiving yards: 3,039
- Touchdowns: 16
- Stats at Pro Football Reference

Donald Bruce Herrmann (born June 5, 1947) is an American former professional football player who was a wide receiver in the National Football League (NFL) for the New York Giants and New Orleans Saints. He played college football for the Waynesburg Yellow Jackets and was selected in the 15th round of the 1969 NFL/AFL draft.

Herrman grew up in Chatham Township, New Jersey, and played football at Chatham High School, where he played as a running back on the school's football team focused primarily on its running game, with Hermann never catching more than eight passes in a season in his high school career.

== NFL career statistics ==
Legend
**Bold**	Career high

Year	Team	Games		Receiving				
Year	Team	GP	GS	Rec	Yds	Avg	Lng	TD
1969	NYG	12	6	33	423	12.8	62	**5**
1970	NYG	13	9	24	290	12.1	21	2
1971	NYG	9	8	27	297	11.0	22	1
1972	NYG	14	14	28	422	15.1	**63**	**5**
1973	NYG	14	14	**43**	520	12.1	46	2
1974	NYG	8	7	10	97	9.7	16	0
1975	NOR	3	0	3	47	**15.7**	28	1
1976	NOR	14	14	34	**535**	**15.7**	57	0
1977	NOR	13	13	32	408	12.8	39	0
		100	85	234	3,039	13.0	63	16
