= Jeff Hand =

American football coach (born 1970)

Biographical details
- Born: July 26, 1970 (age 56)

Coaching career (HC unless noted)
- 1992: Waynesburg (DL)
- 1993: Hanover (DL)
- 1994–1997: Hanover (LB/ST)
- 1998: Benedictine (IL) (DC)
- 1999–2000: Benedictine (IL)
- 2001–2004: Waynesburg
- 2005–2013: Westminster (PA)
- 2014: Amiens Spartiates
- 2015: Rio Branco Futebol Americano

Head coaching record
- Overall: 67–74 (college)
- Bowls: 0–1
- Tournaments: 0–1 (NCAA D-III playoffs)

Jeff Hand (born July 26, 1970) is an American football coach. He served as the head football coach at Benedictine University in Lisle, Illinois from 1999 to 2000, at Waynesburg University in Waynesburg, Pennsylvania from 2001 to 2004, and Westminster College in New Wilmington, Pennsylvania from 2005 to 2013. A native of Ellwood City, Pennsylvania, Hand graduated from Clarion University of Pennsylvania—now known as PennWest Clarion—in 1992.

== Head coaching record ==
=== College ===
Year	Team	Overall	Conference	Standing	Bowl/playoffs
Benedictine Eagles (Illini–Badger Football Conference) (1999–2000)
1999	Benedictine	6–4	3–4	T–5th	
2000	Benedictine	7–3	6–1	2nd	
Benedictine:		13–7	9–5		
Waynesburg Yellow Jackets (Presidents' Athletic Conference) (2001–2004)
2001	Waynesburg	3–7	2–2	T–2nd	
2002	Waynesburg	4–5	2–3	T–3rd	
2003	Waynesburg	9–2	5–0	1st	L NCAA Division III First Round
2004	Waynesburg	7–4	3–2	3rd	L ECAC Southwest Bowl
Waynesburg:		23–18	12–7		
Westminster Titans (Presidents' Athletic Conference) (2005–2013)
2005	Westminster	4–6	2–4	T–4th	
2006	Westminster	2–8	1–5	T–6th	
2007	Westminster	5–5	2–4	T–4th	
2008	Westminster	5–5	3–3	T–3rd	
2009	Westminster	4–6	2–4	T–4th	
2010	Westminster	2–8	1–6	7th	
2011	Westminster	5–5	4–4	T–5th	
2012	Westminster	3–6	2–6	8th	
2013	Westminster	4–6	3–5	T–6th	
Westminster:		31–49	20–41		
Total:		67–74			
National championship Conference title Conference division title or championship game berth
