= Wind Ridge, Pennsylvania =

Unincorporated community in Pennsylvania, US

- Census-designated place
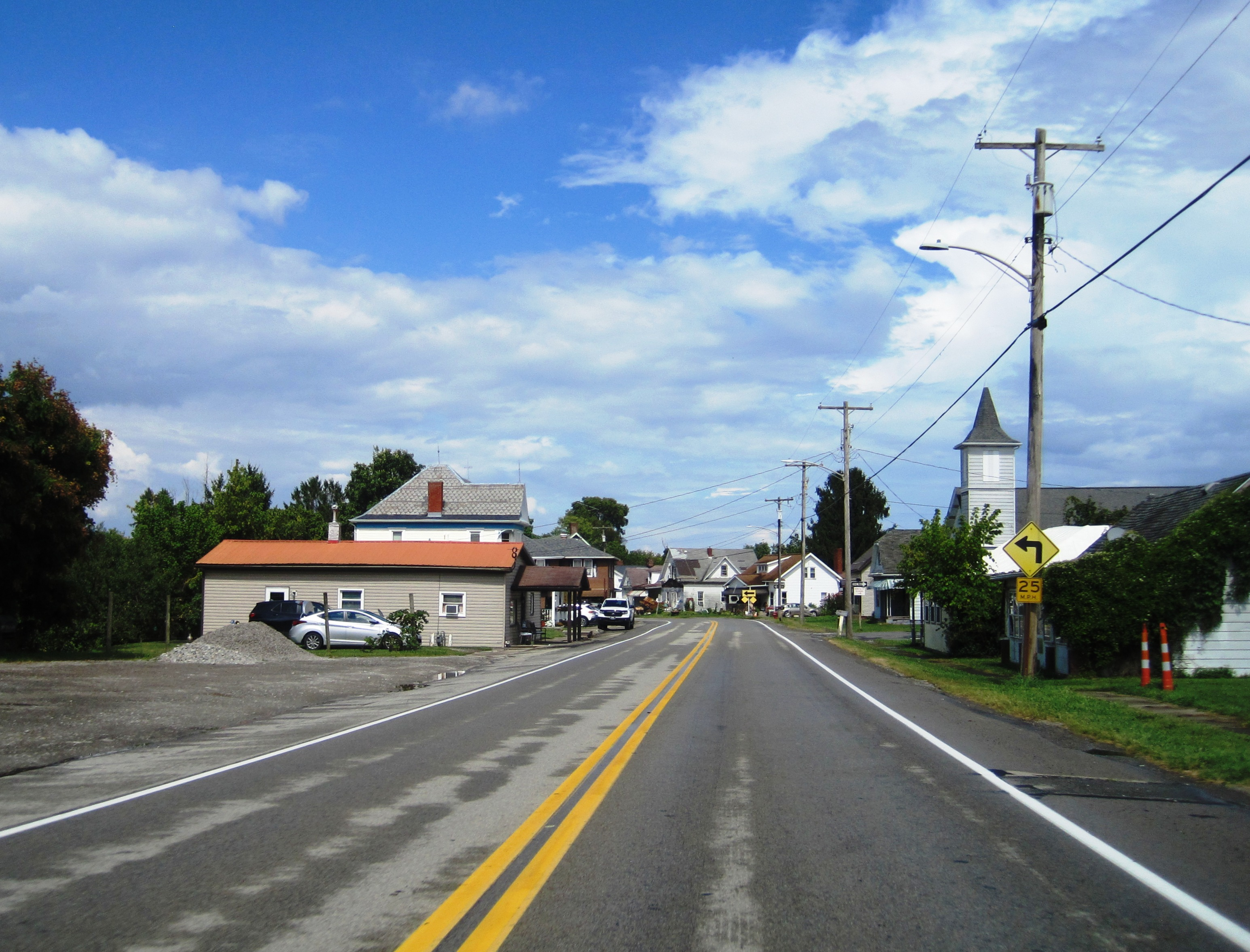
- Eastbound PA 21 in Wind Ridge

- Location within Pennsylvania Location within the United States
- Coordinates: 39°54′40″N 80°25′55″W
- Country: United States
- State: Pennsylvania
- County: Greene
- Township: Richhill

Area
  - Total: 3.15 sq mi (8.15 km^{2})
  - Land: 3.15 sq mi (8.15 km^{2})
  - Water: 0 sq mi (0.0 km^{2})
- Elevation: 1,362 ft (415 m)

Population (2010)
  - Total: 215
  - Density: 68/sq mi (26.4/km^{2})
- Time zone: UTC-5 (Eastern (EST))
  - Summer (DST): UTC-4 (EDT)
- ZIP code: 15380
- FIPS code: 42-85712
- GNIS feature ID: 2630051

Wind Ridge is an unincorporated community and census-designated place (CDP) in Richhill Township, Greene County, Pennsylvania, United States. It is located along Pennsylvania Route 21, 18 miles (29 km) west of Waynesburg, the Greene County seat, and 5 miles (8 km) east of the West Virginia border. As of the 2010 census, the population was 215.

== Demographics ==
Historical population
Census	Pop.	Note	%±
2010	215		—
2020	204		−5.1%
