= Mark L. Booth =

American football coach (1911–1988)

Biographical details
- Born: November 30, 1911; Clarington, Ohio, U.S.
- Died: January 28, 1988 (aged 76); Pittsburgh, Pennsylvania, U.S.

Playing career
- 1934: Waynesburg
- Position(s): Guard

Coaching career (HC unless noted)
- 1935–1941: Waynesburg (assistant)
- 1942: Waynesburg

Head coaching record
- Overall: 2–6

Mark L. Booth (November 30, 1911 – January 28, 1988) was an American college football coach.

== Biography ==
Booth served as the head football coach at Waynesburg College—now known as Waynesburg University—in Waynesburg, Pennsylvania for one season in 1942, compiling a record of 2–6. Booth played college football as a guard at Waynesburg.

Booth served in the United States Navy during World War II and the Korean War.

== Death ==
Booth died on January 28, 1988, at Shadyside Hospital in Pittsburgh, Pennsylvania.

== Head coaching record ==
Year	Team	Overall	Conference	Standing	Bowl/playoffs
Waynesburg Yellow Jackets (Independent) (1942)
1942	Waynesburg	2–6			
Waynesburg:		2–6			
Total:		2–6			
