= Waynesburg Yellow Jackets football =

Intercollegiate American football team

2026 Waynesburg Yellow Jackets football team
- First season: 1895; 131 years ago
- Head coach: Larry Wilson; 1st season, 0–0 (–)
- Location: Waynesburg, Pennsylvania
- Stadium: John F. Wiley Stadium (capacity: 4,000)
- NCAA division: Division III
- League: NCAA
- Conference: Presidents' Athletic Conference
- Colors: Orange and black
- All-time record: 419–396–38 (.513)

NAIA national championships
- 1966

Conference championships
- 10
- Rivalries: Geneva; Washington & Jefferson
- Website: waynesburgsports.com

The Waynesburg Yellow Jackets football program is the intercollegiate American football team for the Waynesburg University located in Waynesburg, Pennsylvania. The team competes in NCAA Division III and is affiliated with the Presidents' Athletic Conference. Prior to joining the PAC, the team competed at the NAIA Division II level among other NAIA football independents. The school's first football team was fielded in 1895. The team plays its home games at the 4,000 seat John F. Wiley Stadium. Larry Wilson was hired as the head coach on December 23, 2025.

== History ==
=== Early History ===
The first game in school history was played against a club team from West Virginia University, in which the Yellow Jackets won 10–0. On December 4, 1895, the first home game in school history was played at Greene County Fair Grounds. The game was described as a "a pig-fight in a hog-wallow."

After resuming play in 1921 following a four-year hiatus due to World War I, coach Frank N. Wolf recorded his first victory, ultimately becoming the school's all-time winningest coach, compiling a record of 65–63–10. Waynesburg captured its first Tri-State Conference title in 1924 and went on to win additional titles in 1932 and 1934 before leaving the conference in 1937. In 1939, the team played a pivotal role in television history by participating in the first televised football game, the 1939 Waynesburg vs. Fordham football game, during which Waynesburg’s Bobby Brooks scored the first-ever televised touchdown. The program resumed again after World War II in 1946 and continued to grow, joining the NAIA’s West Penn Conference in 1958. The 1960s saw success, highlighted by a perfect 11-0 season in 1966 that culminated in an NAIA National Championship under the direction of head coach Carl DePasqua.

=== 1960–1980 ===
Waynesburg enjoyed unparalleled success during the 1960s and 1970s. The pinnacle being the 1966 NAIA football season which included notable players such as quarterback Harry Theofiledes and wide receiver Don Herrmann. The 1966 season culminated in the 1966 NAIA Championship Bowl, played in Tulsa, Oklahoma. Waynesburg defeated Whitewater State in the Championship Bowl, 42–21, to win their first NAIA national title.

The Yellow Jacket teams of the 1970s were notable for their rugged and heavy hitting defenses. Standout players included John Bristor, a Greene County native, who was named to the NAIA District 18 second team defensive unit in 1976, set a Waynesburg record for longest interception return for a touchdown with an 86-yard return against Geneva, and played cornerback for the San Francisco 49ers of the National Football League (NFL).

=== 1980–2000 ===
Through the 1980s and 1990s, Waynesburg achieved several milestones, including its 300th victory in 1983. The 1983 team was populated by NAIA All-American running back Otto Birkhead, team MVP Kevin Jozwiakowski, and veteran defensive back Steven Burchianti, whom the Indiana Inquirer described as one of "the best of the group." The signature win of the 1983 season was a 23–6 victory over Duquesne, highlighted by Burchianti’s fumble recovery and two interceptions.

The team joined the Presidents’ Athletic Conference (PAC) in 1990 and captured its first PAC title in 1998. Major facility upgrades occurred in the late 1990s, including the construction of a new field house honoring Frank N. Wolf and the 4,000-seat John F. "Jack" Wiley Stadium.

=== 21st Century ===
The early 2000s marked a period of record-breaking performances, with quarterback Jeff Dumm setting multiple school records and leading the team to its first NCAA Division III Playoff appearance in 2003. Subsequent years featured more postseason appearances and individual accolades, including running back Robert Heller’s NCAA freshman rushing record and defensive end Mike Czerwien’s all-division NCAA career sacks record.

Waynesburg has also made six appearances in ECAC Bowl games, which are postseason matchups organized by the Eastern College Athletic Conference (ECAC) primarily featuring programs from the Northeast and Mid-Atlantic regions. The Yellow Jackets earned their first ECAC Bowl victory in 2012, defeating Carnegie Mellon 28–24 in the ECAC Southwest Bowl.

The Yellow Jackets have maintained numerous rivalries with their western Pennsylvania counterparts, namely with Geneva and Washington & Jefferson.

== Head coaches ==
The team has had 22 head coaches since its first recorded football game in 1895. The current coach is Larry Wilson who first took the position for the 2026 season.

Tenure	Coach	Record	Win %
1895	Thomas D. Whittles	3–0	1.000
1896–1900, 1902–1916	Red Roberts	37–48–5	.439
1923	Col. Brown	3–4–1	.438
1924	Brit Patterson	7–2–1	.750
1921–1922, 1928–1941	Frank N. Wolf	65–63–1	.508
1925–1927	Dr. Roy E. Easterday	9–13–4	.423
1942	Mark L. Booth	2–6–0	.250
1946	Asa G. Wiley	0–7–1	.063
1947–1950	J. Stanton Keck	17–15–3	.529
1951–1954	John F. Wiley	22–9–1	.703
1955–1958	John Popovich	12–16–4	.438
1959–1962	Peter Mazzaferro	12–19–3	.397
1963–1965	Michael Scarry	17–8–1	.673
1966–1967	Carl DePasqua	19–1	.950
1968–1972	Darrell Lewis	20–25	.444
1973–1982	Hayden Buckley	52–32–3	.615
1983–1986	William Tornabene	16–21–1	.434
1987–1993	Ty Clarke	28–39	.418
1994–2000	Dan Baranik	32–32	.500
2001–2004	Jeff Hand	24–17	.585
2005–2022	Rick Shepas	69–55	.556
2017–2021	Chris Smithley	9–36	.200
2022–2025	Cornelius Coleman	14–26	.350
2026–present	Larry Wilson	0–0	–

== Championships ==
=== National championships ===
Association	Year	Runner-up	Score
NAIA	1966	Whitewater State	42–21

== Conference affiliation ==
- Independent, 1895–1923
- Tri-State Conference, 1923–1937
- Independent, 1937–1958
- Western Pennsylvania Conference, 1958–1969
- NAIA Independent, 1969–1990
- Presidents' Athletic Conference (PAC), 1990–present

== Sources ==
- Dusenberry, William (1975). The Waynesburg College Story 1849-1974. The Kent State University Press. ISBN 978-0873381734.
